= Jacobo Fitz-James Stuart =

Jacobo Fitz-James Stuart may refer to:

- Jacobo Fitz-James Stuart, 3rd Duke of Berwick (1718–1785), Spanish Jacobite
- Jacobo Fitz-James Stuart, 5th Duke of Liria and Jérica (1773–1794), Jacobite and Spanish nobleman
- Jacobo Fitz-James Stuart, 6th Duke of Liria and Jérica (1792–1795), Duke of Berwick
- Jacobo Fitz-James Stuart, 15th Duke of Alba (1821–1881), Spanish nobleman, brother-in-law of Napoleon III
- Jacobo Fitz-James Stuart, 17th Duke of Alba (1878–1953), Spanish peer, diplomat, politician, art collector and Olympic medalist
