= Carlos María Fitz-James Stuart, 16th Duke of Alba =

Spanish nobleman and diplomat (1849–1901)

The Most Excellent Carlos María Fitz-James Stuart 16th Duke of Alba GE
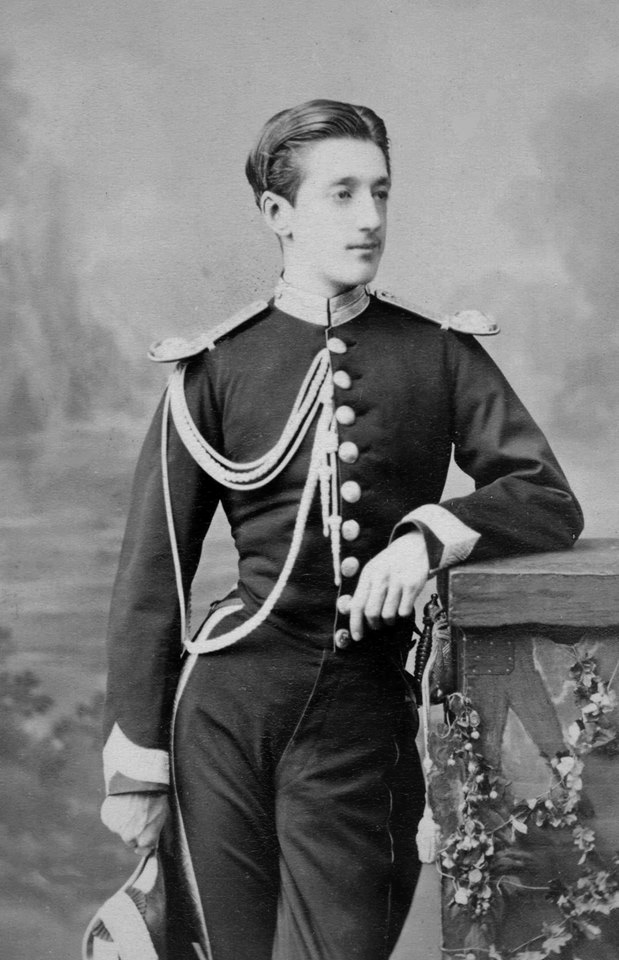
- Portrayed circa 1870
- Born: 4 December 1849; Madrid, Spain
- Died: 15 October 1901 (aged 51); New York City, U.S.
- Spouse: María del Rosario Falcó y Osorio, 22nd Countess of Siruela (m. 1877)
- Children: Jacobo Fitz-James Stuart, 17th Duke of Alba; Eugenia Sol María del Pilar, Duchess of Santoña; Hernando Fitz-James Stuart, 18th Duke of Peñaranda de Duero
- Parents: Jacobo Fitz-James Stuart, 15th Duke of Alba (father); María Francisca de Sales Portocarrero, 16th Duchess of Peñaranda (mother)
- Family: House of Alba branch of Fitz-James Stuart

Carlos María Fitz-James Stuart y Palafox, 16th Duke of Alba, 9th Duke of Berwick GE (4 December 1849 – 15 October 1901) was a Spanish nobleman and diplomat, who held, amongst others, the Dukedom of Alba and Berwick.

== Biography ==
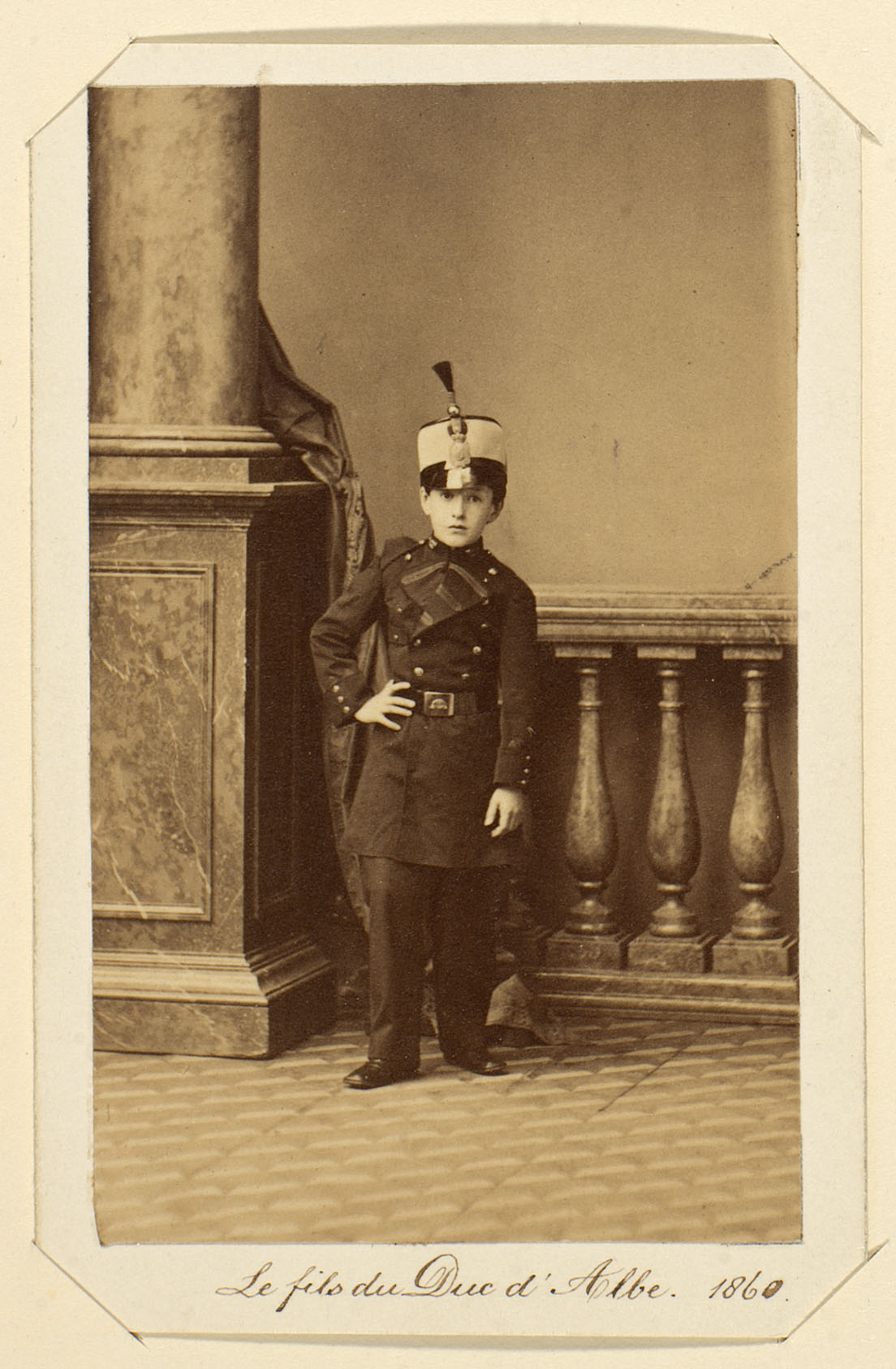
The 16th Duke of Alba aged 11 in uniform of the War of Africa, 1860

He was born at Madrid, the only son of Jacobo Fitz-James Stuart, 15th Duke of Alba. His mother María Francisca was the daughter of Cipriano de Palafox y Portocarrero, Duke of Peñaranda, and sister of Eugénie de Montijo, Empress of the French.
During his father's lifetime he was styled Duke of Huéscar. On 16 September 1860 he succeeded his mother in all her titles except the Marquisate of the Bañeza and the Viscountcy of Palacios de la Valduerna, and on 10 July 1881 he succeeded to all his father's titles except the Dukedom of Galisteo, which went to his sister María de la Asunción Rosalía, 18th Duchess of Galisteo. As a result of this inheritance the Duke of Alba was a Grandee of the first class twelve times over. As heir-male of James FitzJames, 1st Duke of Berwick he also claimed the English title of Duke of Berwick, and used the title when staying with Queen Victoria at Balmoral Castle.

He married María del Rosario, 22nd Countess of Siruela on 10 December 1877 at Madrid. She was herself a Grandee of the first class, and daughter of Manuel Pascual Luis Carlos Felix Fortunato Falcó, Marquis of Almonazir by his wife María del Pilar, 3rd Duchess of Fernán Nuñez. His wife was born at Pau on 3 October 1854 and died at Paris on 27 March 1904.

They had 3 children:

- Jacobo Fitz-James Stuart, 17th Duke of Alba
- Eugenia Sol María del Pilar, married the Duke of Santoña, Lady-in-waiting of Queen Victoria Eugenia.
- Hernando Fitz-James Stuart, 18th Duke of Peñaranda de Duero.

Like his father, he was educated at the Salamanca University and the military school of Paris. He was Spanish Ambassador in Brussels between 1872 and 1878, and in Saint Petersburg until 1885. Between 1887 and 1894 he was Grand Treasurer of Spain and diplomat in Istanbul. In 1895, he founded the Real Club de la Puerta de Hierro along with a group of distinguished Spanish nobles and King Alfonso XIII of Spain.

The Duke of Alba was also a Senator of the Kingdom, Chamberlain to the Queen Regent Christina, and a Knight of the Golden Fleece. He died from cancer as Spanish Ambassador in the US in New York, aboard Sir Thomas Lipton's yacht, aged 51.

=== Titles ===
The titles he inherited from his father

- 16th Duke of Alba, Grandee of Spain
- 14th Duke of Huéscar, Grandee of Spain
- 9th Duke of Berwick, Grandee of Spain
- 9th Duke of Liria and Jérica, Grandee of Spain
- 9th Duke of Montoro, Grandee of Spain
- 12th Count-Duke of Olivares, Grandee of Spain
- 12th Marquess of Elche
- 15th Marquess of Villanueva del Río
- 14th Marquess of Carpio, Grandee of Spain
- 16th Count of Gelves
- 19th Count of Modica

The titles inherited from his mother:

- 17th Duke of Peñaranda de Duero, Grandee of Spain
- 11th Marquess of Valderrábano
- 18th Marquess of Villanueva del Fresno and Barcarrota,
- 14th Marquess of la Algaba
- 16th Marquess of La Bañeza
- 16th Marquess of Mirallo
- 15th Marquess of Valdunquillo
- 10th Count of Montijo, Grandee of Spain
- 12th Count of Baños
- 18th Count of Miranda del Castañar
- 19th Count of Fuentidueña
- 14th Count of Casarrubios del Monte
- 21rd Count of San Esteban de Gormaz
- 19th Viscount of Palacios de la Valduerna

== Ancestry ==
Ancestors of Carlos María Fitz-James Stuart, 16th Duke of Alba

16. Carlos Fitz-James Stuart, 4th Duke of Berwick
8. Jacobo Fitz-James Stuart, 5th Duke of Berwick
17. Princess Caroline zu Stolberg-Gedern
4. Carlos Miguel Fitz-James Stuart, 14th Duke of Alba
18. Pedro Fernández de Silva, 10th duque de Híjar
9. María Teresa Fernández de Híjar y Palafox
19. Rafaela de Palafox
2. Jacobo Fitz-James Stuart, 15th Duke of Alba
20. Carlos Antonio Ventimiglia
10. Luigi Ventimiglia, 2nd Prince of Grammonte
21. Segismunda Sieripepoli, V baronesa de Mangiadaini
5. Rosalía Ventimiglia di Grammonte
22. Francisco Moncada, IV príncipe de Lardería
11. Eleonora Moncada di Larderia
23. María de la Concepción Branciforte
1. Carlos Fitz-James Stuart, 16th Duke of Alba
24. Joaquín Antonio de Palafox, 6th Marquis of Ariza
12. Felipe Antonio de Palafox y Cröy d'Havré
25. Princess Marie-Anne-Charlotte of Croÿ d'Havré
6. Cipriano de Palafox, 13th Duke of Peñaranda del Duero
26. Cristóbal de Portocarrero, 5th Marquis of Valderrábano
13. María Francisca de Sales de Portocarrero, 6th Countess of Montijo
27. María Josefa López de Zuñiga y Pacheco
3. María Francisca de Palafox, 10th Countess of Montijo
28. William Kirkpatrick
14. William Kirkpatrick
29. Mary Wilson
7. María Manuela Kirkpatrick
30. Henri, Baron de Grevigné
15. Marie-Françoise de Grevigné
31. Francisca Antonia de Gallegos

== Titles ==
Spanish nobility
Preceded by Jacobo Fitz-James Stuart	Duke of Alba, et cetera 1881–1901	Succeeded by Jacobo Fitz-James Stuart
Preceded by Maria Francesca Palafox Portocarrero	Count of Miranda del Castañar; 1860–1901	Succeeded by Jacobo Fitz-James Stuart
Preceded by Maria Francesca Palafox Portocarrero	Duke of Peñaranda, Marquis of Valderrabano, Count of Montijo; 1860–1901	Succeeded by Hernando Fitz-James Stuart
Preceded by Maria Francesca Palafox Portocarrero	Count of Teba; 1860–1901	Succeeded by Eugenia María del Pilar Fitz-James Stuart
Titles in pretence
Peerage of England
Preceded by Jacobo Fitz-James Stuart	Duke of Berwick, et cetera 1881–1901	Succeeded by Jacobo Fitz-James Stuart
