= County of Modica =

Feudal territory of the Kingdom of Sicily

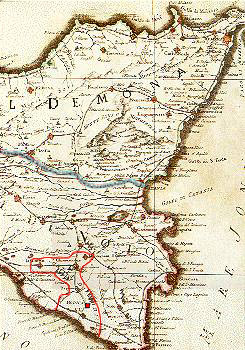
Historical map of the island Sicily (18th century), showing the County of Modica between the red line.

The County of Modica was a feudal territory within the Kingdom of Sicily from 1296 to 1812. Its capital was Modica, on the southern tip of the island, although the cities of Ragusa and Scicli housed some government offices for a period. Today it is perpetuated only as a title held by the head of the House of Alba, Carlos Fitz-James Stuart, 19th Duke of Alba.

== History ==
=== The Chiaramontes ===
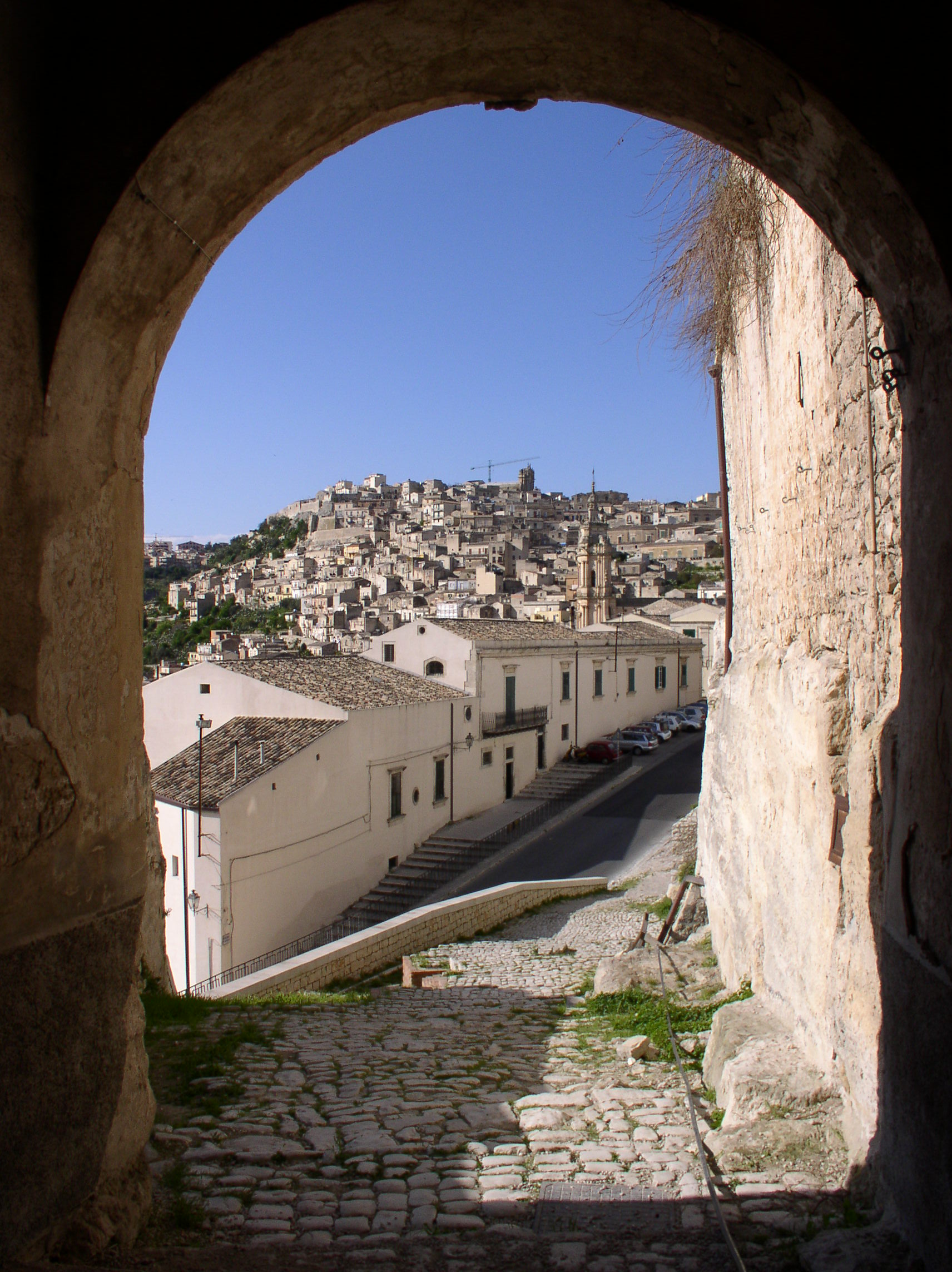
The County Palace entrance, at the higher quarters of the old town.

On 25 March 1296, the Aragonese King Frederick III of Sicily conceded the great County of Modica to Manfredi I Chiaramonte, who fought the Angevin and their king, Charles, and married Isabella Mosca, daughter of the rebel count Federico Mosca.

The king gave the first dynasty of counts many fiefdoms in Agrigento, Caccamo, Licata and Palermo, where they built the Palazzo Chiaramonte, also known as Palazzo Steri; once the residence of the Aragonese-Spanish viceroys of Sicily and later the tribunal of the Inquisition, it now belongs to the University of Palermo. On its ceilings is one of the most important wood-based pictorial cycles of the Italian Middle Ages.

The Chiaramonte family built many castles at Mussomeli, Caccamo, Chiaramonte Gulfi, Ragusa and all over Sicily, in a very typical Gothic style.

On the death of King Frederick IV of Sicily, Manfredi III Chiaramonte became viceroy and tried to defend the throne of Sicily from Martin I of Sicily. Martin's father was the future King Martin I of Aragon, and his grandparents were King Peter IV of Aragon and Eleanor of Sicily. In 1389 he married Maria of Sicily, who was the only child and daughter of King Frederick IV. In 1392 he returned with Maria to Sicily with a military force and to defeat a group of opposing noblemen. However, the city of Palermo fell and the new King Martin I of Sicily had its governor, Andrea Chiaramonte, son of the late Manfredi, 8th Count of Modica, beheaded on 1 July 1392 in front of his palace in the Marina Square in Palermo.

=== The Cabreras ===
A new count was created, i.e. Bernat IV de Cabrera, a Spanish condottiero who conquered Sicily for the new king Martin I. The county of Modica was now bigger and stronger: it included the towns of Scicli, Spaccaforno (today's Ispica), Ragusa, Chiaramonte Gulfi, Comiso, Giarratana, Monterosso Almo and Biscari and the castles of Dirillo and Cammarana. The Count had the faculty to export over three thousand tons of grain per year free of duties from two of his seven ports, Pozzallo, where he built the Cabrera Tower, and Mazzarelli (today called Marina di Ragusa), where a smaller tower was built.

From 1296, the city of Modica was the capital of a "state within a state": the Investiture Diploma for Bernat Cabrera says Sicut ego in regno meo tu in comitato tuo ("You in your county as I in my kingdom"). The county had a Governor, its own tribunals including the Tribunal of Second Instance, and a police force. The cities of the state were ruled by municipal magistracies.

=== 15th century to the present ===
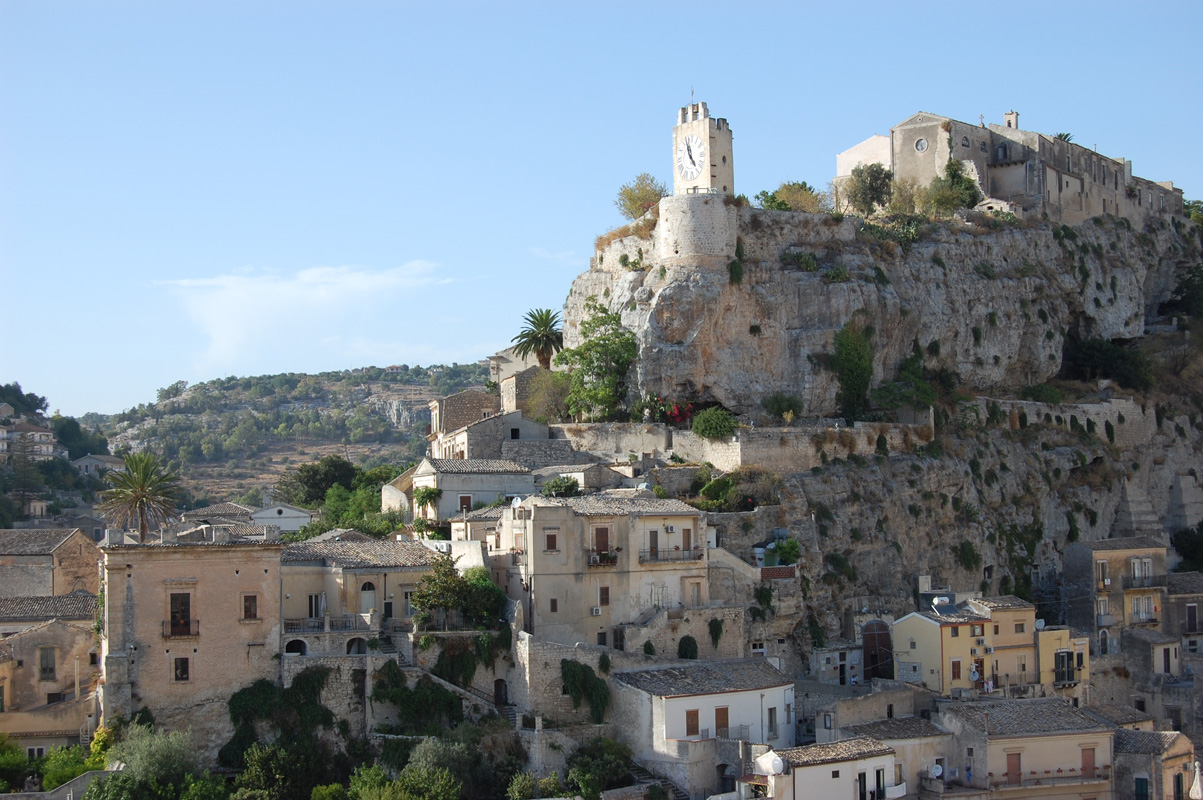
The Castle of Modica in 2007

In the 15th and 16th centuries, the spread of emphyteusis and the privatization of the land by Governor Bernaldo Del Nero made the city of Modica the foremost in the south-east of Sicily. The lower part of Modica grew with churches, high-class palaces and monasteries, until the 1693 earthquake that killed over 60,000 people in Sicily from Catania to Syracuse and destroyed numerous buildings. The Late Baroque architecture of Val di Noto is the result of reconstruction following the earthquake.

On 5 March 1607, Vittoria Colonna Enriquez-Cabrera, Countess of Modica, daughter of the Viceroy Marcantonio Colonna Duke of Tagliacozzo and wife of Count Ludovico III Enriquez-Cabrera, founded the new city of Vittoria, now the second most populous city in the province of Ragusa.

Pasquale Enríquez de Cabrera died childless in 1740, and the title passed to his sister Maria Enríquez de Cabrera, who was unmarried and also childless. With her death in 1742 two years later, the House of Enríquez-Cabrera became extinct and by statutes of succession the county passed to María Teresa Álvarez de Toledo, 11th Duchess of Alba, the great-granddaughter of Juan Gaspare Enríquez de Cabrera, 10th Count of Modica. Hereby the county came into possession of the House of Alba, and the title is since then held in succession by the Dukes of Alba of its three cadet houses: first the House of Álvarez de Toledo (extinct in 1755), secondly the House of Silva (extinct in 1802), and thirdly the House of FitzJames-Stuart (extant).

However, by the time of these dynasties, the title of Count was meaningless and carried little power, and Modica governed itself. This situation continued until the 18th century, when Sicily was ruled by the Austrian Empire. Then, in the late 18th and early 19th century, it was part of the Kingdom of Sicily, ruled from Naples (this kingdom changed its name to the Kingdom of the Two Sicilies). Finally, after the Risorgimento it was unified with the rest of Italy, as it is today.

As head of the House of Alba, the title is currently held by Carlos Fitz-James Stuart, 19th Duke of Alba, who is the 22nd Count of Modica.

== List of counts of Modica ==
=== First Creation in 1296 ===
House of Chiaramonte

No	Name	Became Count	Ceased to be Count
1	Manfredi	1296	1321
2	Giovanni II	1321	1342
3	Manfredi II	1342	1353
4	Simone	1353	1357
5	Federico III	1357	1364
6	Matteo	1364	1377
7	Manfredi III	1377	1391
8	Andrea	1391	1392

=== Second Creation in 1392 ===
House of Cabrera

No	Name	Became Count	Ceased to be Count
1	Bernat	1392	1423
2	Giovanni Bernardo	1423	1466
3	Joan I	1466	1474
4	Joan II	1474	1477
5	Anna I with Frederick Enriquez	1477	1526/1530

House of Enríquez-Cabrera (also Admirals of Castile)

No	Name	Became Count	Ceased to be Count
6	Ludovico I	1530	1565.
7	Ludovico II	1565	1596
8	Ludovico III	1596	1600
9	Juan Alfonso	1600	1647
10	Juan Gaspare	1647	1691
11	Giovanni Tommaso	1691	1702
12	Pasquale	1729	1740
13	Maria	1740	1742

House of Alba

No	Name	Became Count	Ceased to be Count
14	María Teresa	1742	1755
15	Fernando	1755	1776
16	María Cayetana	1776	1802
17	Carlos Miguel	1802	1835
18	Jacobo	1835	1881
19	Carlos María	1881	1902
20	Jacobo	1902	1953
21	Cayetana	1953	2014
22	Carlos	2014	present
