= House of FitzJames =

European noble family

FitzJames
- Jacobite noble family
- Arms of the House of FitzJames
- Parent house: House of Stuart
- Country: Kingdom of England, Kingdom of Scotland, Kingdom of France, Kingdom of Spain, Kingdom of Sicily, Kingdom of Two Sicilies
- Founded: 1670
- Founder: James FitzJames, 1st Duke of Berwick
- Current head: Jacobo Fitz-James Stuart y Gómez, 12th Duke of Berwick
- Titles: List: Duke of Berwick; Duke of Fitz-James (French); Duke of Galisteo (Spanish); Duke of Liria and Jérica (Spanish); Earl of Tinmouth; Viscount of FitzJames; Baron Bosworth
- Connected families: House of Alba; House of Silva

The House of FitzJames Stuart, or simply FitzJames, is a noble house founded by James FitzJames, 1st Duke of Berwick. He was the illegitimate son of James II & VII, King of England, Scotland and Ireland, a monarch of the House of Stuart. After the Glorious Revolution of 1688, the 1st Duke of Berwick followed his father into exile, and much of the family's history since then has been in Spain and France, with several members of the family serving in a military capacity.

The house has two main branches:

1. The senior branch: It carries the title of Duke of Berwick and residing in Spain, originating from the 1st Duke's first marriage to Honora Burke, Countess of Lucan. Over time, this branch has accumulated many titles, including a few grandeeships of Spain, with some members acting as ambassadors or military officers.
2. Junior Branch: Associated with France, this branch derives from the 1st Duke's second marriage to an Englishwoman, Anne Bulkeley. A notable member of this branch was Édouard de Fitz-James, 6th Duke of Fitz-James (1776–1838), an ultraroyalist who escaped to Italy after the French Revolution and returned to France around the time of the Bourbon Restoration, after which he became a prominent politician. This branch became extinct in the male line upon the death of the 10th Duke of Fitz-James in 1967.

== Dukes of Berwick and of Liria ==
- James FitzJames, 1st Duke of Berwick
- James Fitz-James Stuart, 2nd Duke of Berwick
- Jacobo Fitz-James Stuart, 3rd Duke of Berwick
- Carlos Fitz-James Stuart, 4th Duke of Berwick
- Jacobo Fitz-James Stuart, 5th Duke of Berwick
- Jacobo Fitz-James Stuart, 6th Duke of Berwick

This branch gained the Spanish title of Duke of Alba after the death in 1802 of the childless María Cayetana de Silva, 13th Duchess of Alba. The branch's ancestral link to the dukedom of Alba was through the 4th Duke of Berwick, whose mother was the granddaughter of the 11th Duchess of Alba.

- Carlos Fitz-James Stuart, 7th Duke of Berwick and 14th Duke of Alba
- Jacobo Fitz-James Stuart, 8th Duke of Berwick and 15th Duke of Alba
- Carlos Fitz-James Stuart, 9th Duke of Berwick and 16th Duke of Alba
- Jacobo Fitz-James Stuart, 10th Duke of Berwick and 17th Duke of Alba

Upon the death of the 10th Duke of Berwick in 1953, his Spanish titles (including the dukedoms of Alba and of Liria) went to his daughter while the Jacobite dukedom of Berwick went to his nephew (who was already the 19th Duke of Peñaranda de Duero), due to differences between the Spanish and Jacobite succession laws (male-preference primogeniture and agnatic primogeniture respectively). The current holder of the Jacobite dukedom is Jacobo Hernando Fitz-James Stuart y Gómez, 12th Duke of Berwick and his heir apparent is the duke's brother Don Luis Esteban Fitz-James Stuart y Gómez, 14th Marquess of Valderrábano.

== Junior branch ==
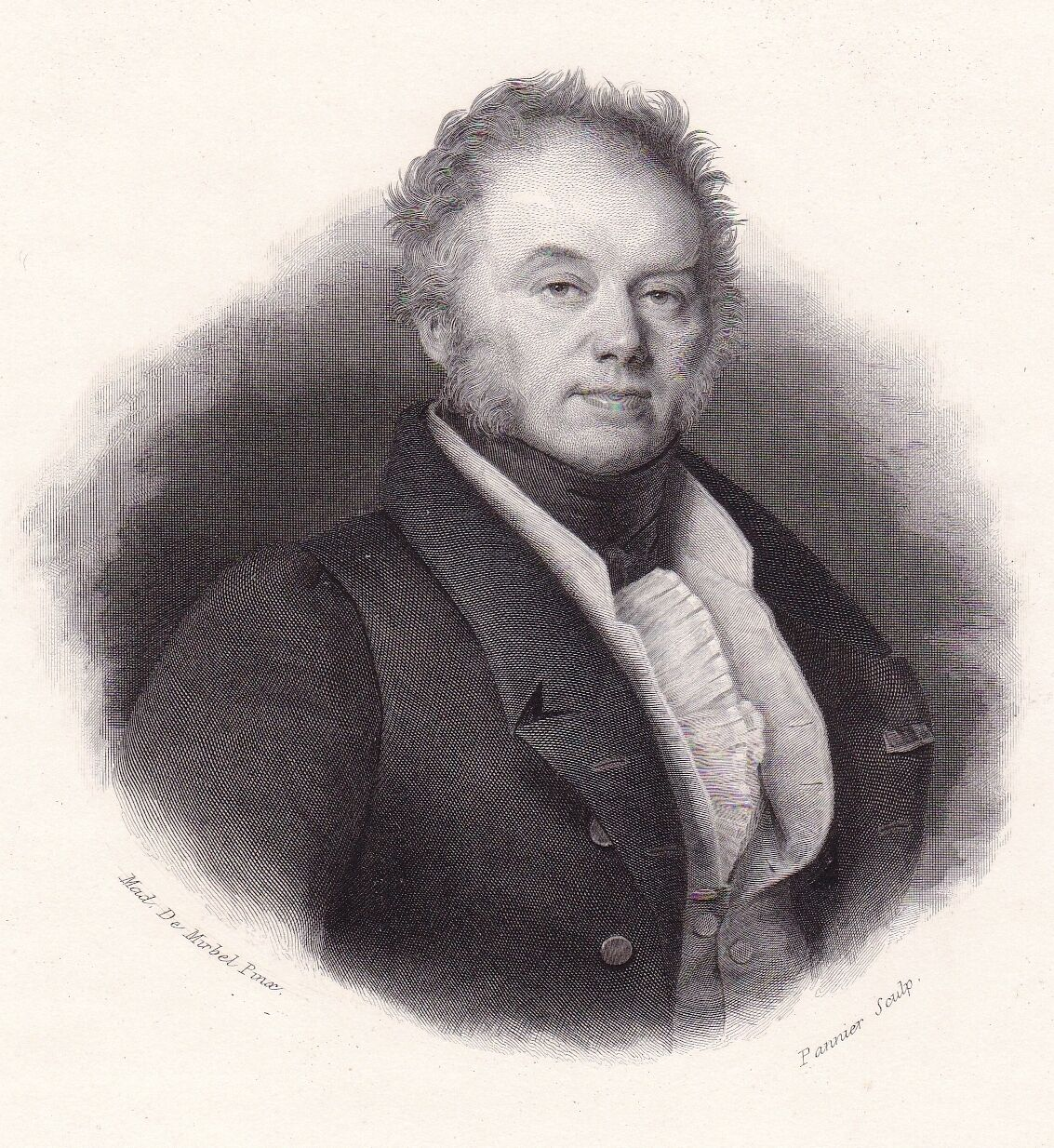
Édouard, 6th Duke of Fitz-James

=== Dukes of FitzJames ===
- James FitzJames, 1st Duke of Berwick
- Henry James Fitz-James, 2nd Duke of Fitz-James
- François de Fitz-James, 3rd Duke of Fitz-James
- Charles de Fitz-James, 4th Duke of Fitz-James
- Jacques Charles de Fitz-James, 5th Duke of Fitz-James
- Édouard de Fitz-James, 6th Duke of Fitz-James
- Jacques Marie Emmanuel de Fitz-James, 7th Duke of Fitz-James
- Édouard Antoine Sidoine de Fitz-James, 8th Duke of Fitz-James
- Jacques Gustave Sidoine de Fitz-James, 9th Duke of Fitz-James
- Jacques de Fitz-James, 10th Duke of Fitz-James

== Sources ==
=== References ===
- Ruvigny, Melville H. (2000). The Nobilities of Europe. Adamant Media Corporation. ISBN 1-4021-8561-8.
