= Philip V of Spain Investing Marshal Berwick with the Golden Fleece =

Painting by Jean-Auguste-Dominique Ingres

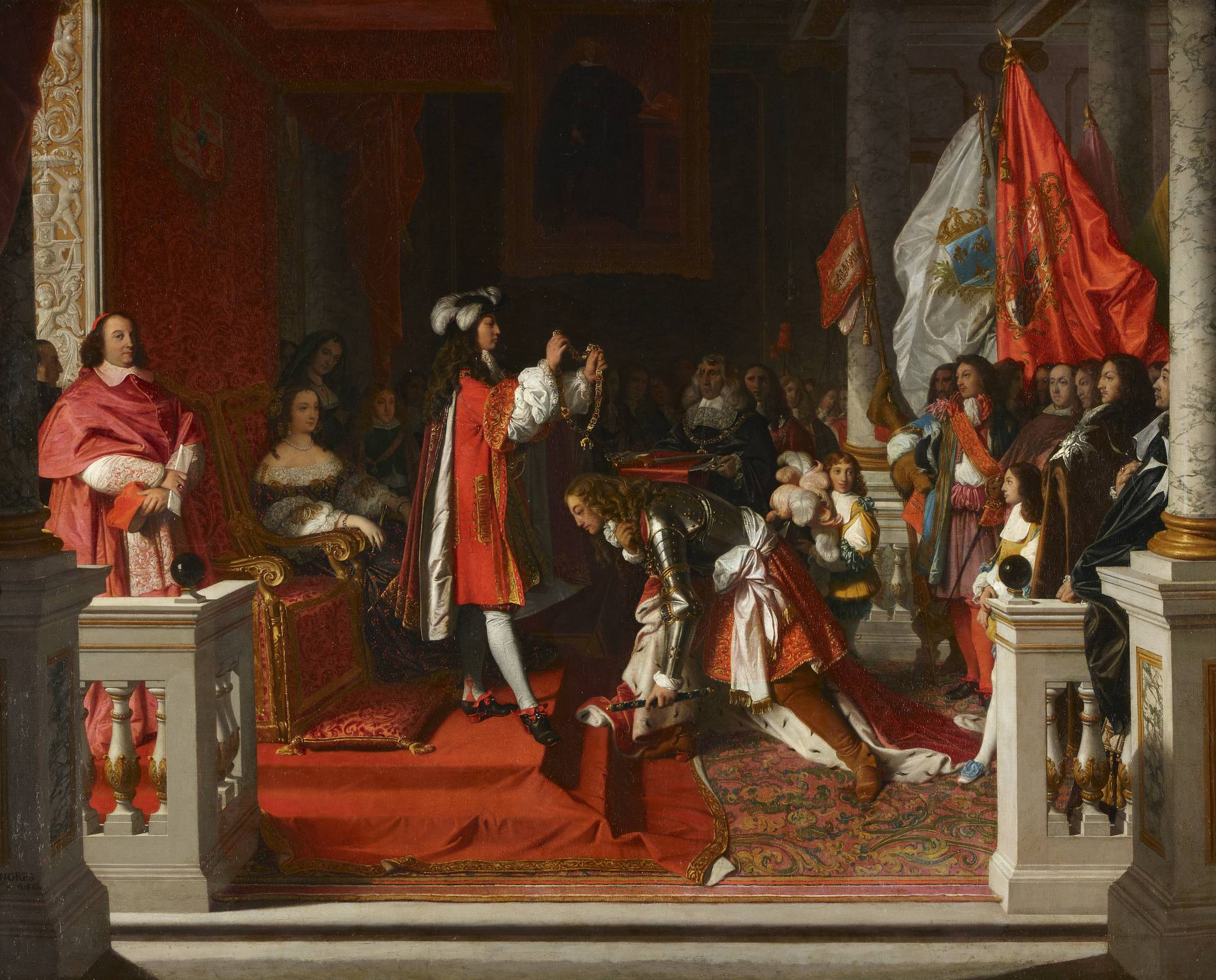
- Artist: Jean-Auguste-Dominique Ingres
- Year: 1818
- Type: Oil on canvas, history painting
- Dimensions: 88 cm × 109 cm (35 in × 43 in)
- Location: Liria Palace; Madrid

Philip V of Spain Investing Marshal Berwick with the Golden Fleece (French: Philippe V remettant la toison d'or au maréchal de Berwick) is an 1818 history painting by the French artist Jean-Auguste-Dominique Ingres. It depicts a scene from 1707 during the War of the Spanish Succession. Following his victory at the Battle of Almansa over Allied forces, the French-born Spanish monarch Philip V awards the Duke of Berwick with the Order of the Golden Fleece. Berwick, a son of James II of England, was a Marshal in the French Army.

Ingres exhibited the picture at the Salon of 1819 at the Louvre in Paris. The painting was commissioned by the Duke of Alba, a descendant of Berwick, with a preparatory drawing made in 1817. It was one of three historical scenes commissioned by Alba from Ingres featuring incidents from the history of family. It was produced while Ingres was in Rome. It remains in the collection of the Dukes of Alba at their residence Liria Palace in Madrid.

== See also ==
- List of paintings by Jean-Auguste-Dominique Ingres

== Bibliography ==
- Grimme, Karin H. Jean-Auguste-Dominique Ingres, 1780-1867. Taschen, 2006.
- Shelton, Andrew Carrington. Ingres and His Critics. Cambridge University Press, 2005.
- Tinterow, Gary & Conisbee, Philip (ed.) Portraits by Ingres: Image of an Epoch. Metropolitan Museum of Art, 1999.
