= Cayetana Fitz-James Stuart, 18th Duchess of Alba =

Grandee of Spain (1926–2014)

The Most Excellent Duchess of Alba GE
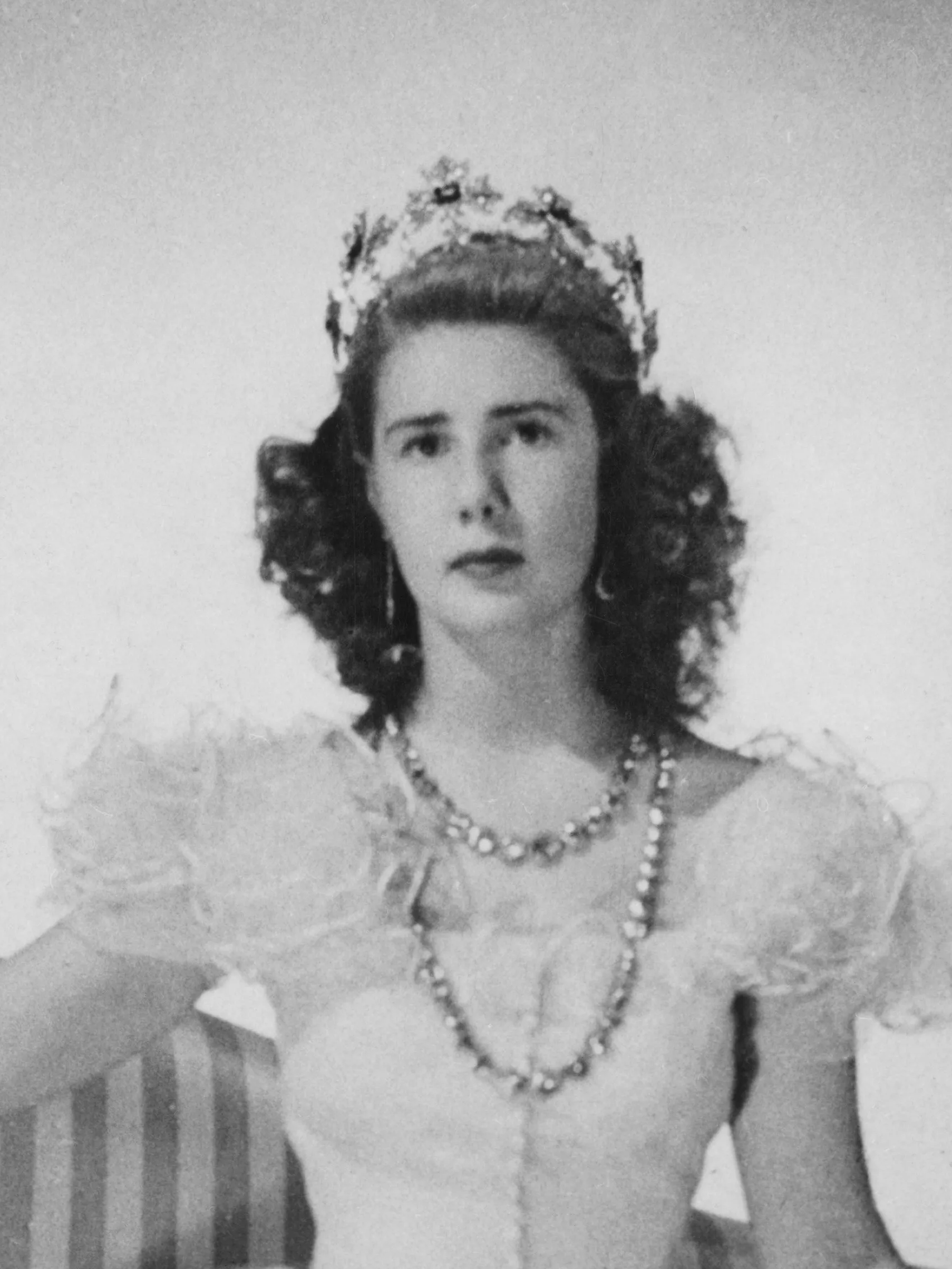
- Portrayed c. 1947
- Born: María del Rosario Cayetana Paloma Alfonsa Victoria Eugenia Fernanda Teresa Francisca de Paula Lourdes Antonia Josefa Fausta Rita Castor Dorotea Santa Esperanza Fitz-James Stuart y Silva; 28 March 1926; Liria Palace, Madrid, Spain
- Died: 20 November 2014 (aged 88); Palace of the Dukes of Alba, Seville, Spain
- Noble family: House of Alba branch of Fitz-James Stuart
- Spouses: Luis Martínez de Irujo y Artázcoz (m. 1947; died 1972) Jesús Aguirre y Ortiz de Zárate (m. 1978; died 2001) Alfonso Díez Carabantes (m. 2011)
- Issue: Carlos Fitz-James Stuart, 19th Duke of Alba; Alfonso Martínez de Irujo y Fitz-James Stuart, 18th Duke of Híjar; Jacobo Fitz-James Stuart y Martínez de Irujo, 23rd Count of Siruela; Fernando Martínez de Irujo y Fitz-James Stuart, 11th Marquis of San Vicente del Barco; Cayetano Martínez de Irujo y Fitz-James Stuart, 4th Duke of Arjona, 13th Count of Salvatierra; Eugenia Martínez de Irujo, 12th Duchess of Montoro
- Father: Jacobo Fitz-James Stuart, 17th Duke of Alba
- Mother: María del Rosario de Silva, 9th Marchioness of San Vicente del Barco

María del Rosario Cayetana Fitz-James Stuart y Silva, 18th Duchess of Alba GE (28 March 1926 – 20 November 2014) was a Spanish aristocrat.

She was the third woman of the House of Alba to hold the Dukedom of Alba in her own right. Also, during her life, she was the most titled aristocrat in the world, as recognized by The Guinness Book of Records; she was grandee of Spain fourteen times and had around 50 noble titles. This record is now held by Princess Victoria of Hohenlohe-Langenburg, 20th Duchess of Medinaceli.

== First years ==
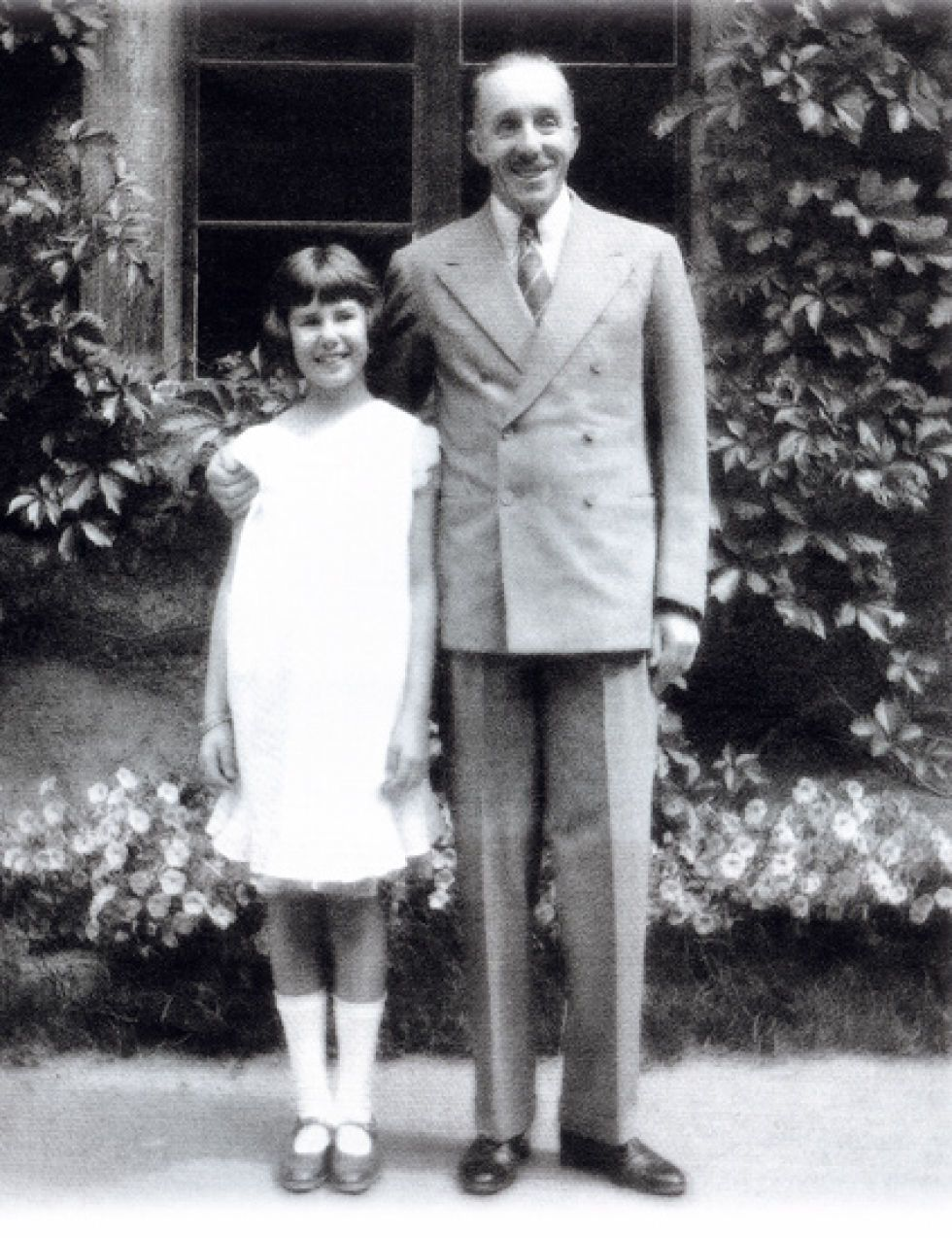
Cayetana with King Alfonso XIII, in the 1930s.

Born in Liria Palace in Madrid on 28 March 1926, Cayetana Fitz-James Stuart was the only child of Jacobo Fitz-James Stuart, 17th Duke of Alba (a prominent Spanish politician and diplomat during the 1930s and 1940s) and his wife, María del Rosario de Silva y Gurtubay, 9th Marchioness of San Vicente del Barco. She was the eighth great-granddaughter of James II and VII.

She was baptized on 17 April 1926 in the Royal Chapel, her godparents being King Alfonso XIII and his wife, Queen Victoria Eugenia. For her baptism, the baptismal font of Santo Domingo de Guzmán was brought, which is only used to baptize monarchs or their descendants.

Almost everyone knew her as Cayetana, the name she preferred. Her father called her "Tanuca" and Queen Sofia and other close associates called her "Tana".

A few months after Cayetana was born, her mother, María del Rosario, fell ill with tuberculosis. To prevent infection, part of the Liria Palace was reserved for María del Rosario. The domestic staff tried to keep Cayetana away from her mother, and if the girl ever tried to avoid them, her mother would try to stop her by throwing something to make her run away. These traumatic situations remained forever in Cayetana's memory.

== Socialite ==
As a socialite, the Duchess met famous VIPs from Spain and abroad. Jackie Kennedy visited her Seville palace, as did Wallis Simpson, Princess Grace and Rainier III, Prince of Monaco, Queen Anne-Marie of Greece and King Constantine II of Greece. In 1959, the Duchess, together with designer Yves Saint Laurent, hosted a Dior show for charitable purposes in her Liria Palace, Madrid, a palace which movie stars Charlton Heston, Sophia Loren, Audrey Hepburn and Raf Vallone visited. In her youth the Duchess posed for Richard Avedon and Cecil Beaton and she appeared on the cover of Time and Harper's Bazaar.

She was inducted into Vanity Fair's International Best Dressed List Hall of Fame in 2011.

== Marriages ==
On 12 October 1947, the Duchess married Don Luis Martínez de Irujo y Artázcoz (1919–1972), younger son of the Duke of Sotomayor and his wife Ana María de Artázcoz y Labayen (1892–1930), court lady of Queen Victoria Eugenia of Spain. The wedding in Spain, two years after the end of World War II, resisted the decline in frequency of very extravagant European weddings among high nobility and attracted the attention of the international media. The New York Times called it "the most expensive wedding of the world." It was reported that 20 million pesetas (equivalent to $10,000,000 rounded in 2015) was spent.

The couple had five sons, one daughter and nine grandchildren.

- Carlos Fitz-James Stuart, 19th Duke of Alba (born 2 October 1948, Madrid)
- Alfonso Martínez de Irujo y Fitz-James Stuart, 18th Duke of Híjar (born 22 October 1950, Madrid)
- Jacobo Fitz-James Stuart y Martínez de Irujo, 23rd Count of Siruela (born 15 July 1954, Madrid)
- Fernando Martínez de Irujo y Fitz-James Stuart, 11th Marquis of San Vicente del Barco (born 11 July 1959)
- Cayetano Martínez de Irujo y Fitz-James Stuart, 4th Duke of Arjona, 13th Count of Salvatierra (born 4 April 1963, Madrid)
- Eugenia Martínez de Irujo, 12th Duchess of Montoro (born 26 November 1968)

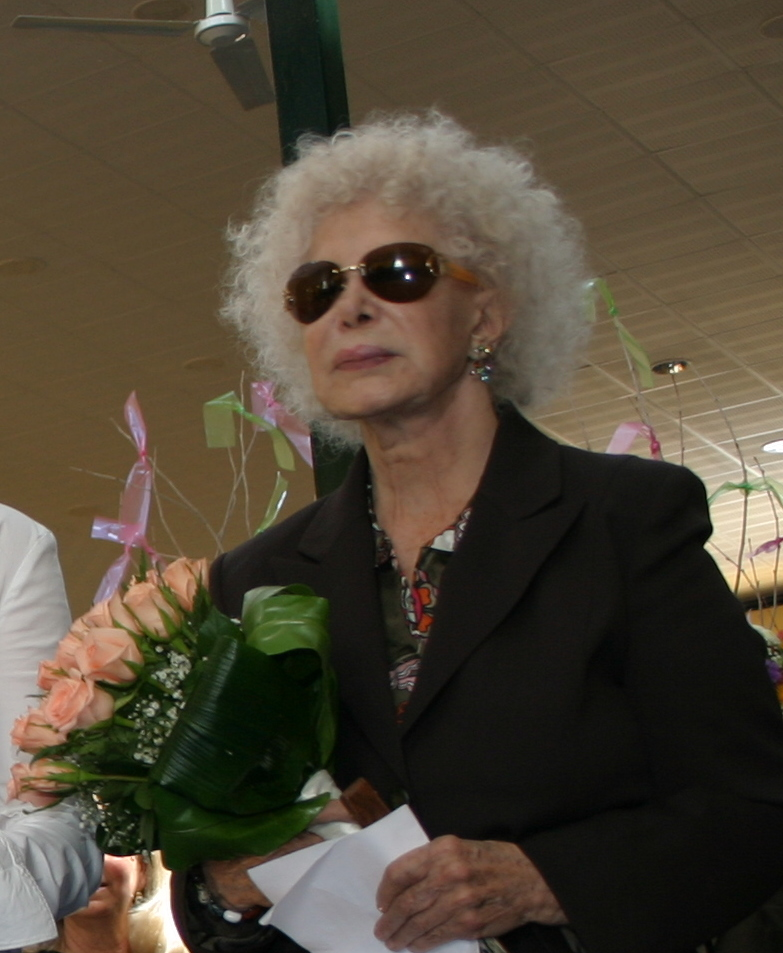
The Duchess in 2005

Widowed in 1972, the Duchess remarried first on 16 March 1978 Jesús Aguirre y Ortiz de Zárate (1934–2001), a Doctor of Theology and a former priest. The wedding caused shock; Aguirre was illegitimate, which carried a stigma among the wealthy and devout in 1970s Spain. Eight years younger than the Duchess, he maintained a good relationship with her children. During their marriage he administered, with his stepson Carlos, the Alba estates. Aguirre died in 2001.

The re-widowed Duchess expressed her wish to marry Alfonso Díez Carabantes in the 2000s, a civil servant who separately had a public relations business, 24 years her junior. It was reported objections came from her children and from King Juan Carlos. The House of Alba in 2008 issued a statement saying that the relationship "was based on a long friendship and there are no plans to marry". The duchess decided to proceed and gave her children their inheritance which included majestic palaces in Spain, paintings by old and modern masters (from Fra Angelico, Titian and Goya to Renoir and Marc Chagall), a first-edition copy of Cervantes's Don Quixote, letters written by Christopher Columbus, and substantial land; her wealth was estimated at between €600 million and €3.5 billion. Díez formally renounced any claim to her wealth. They married on 5 October 2011 at the Palacio de las Dueñas in Seville, where the Duchess, whose passions included flamenco, performed a short dance for the spectators.

== Death ==
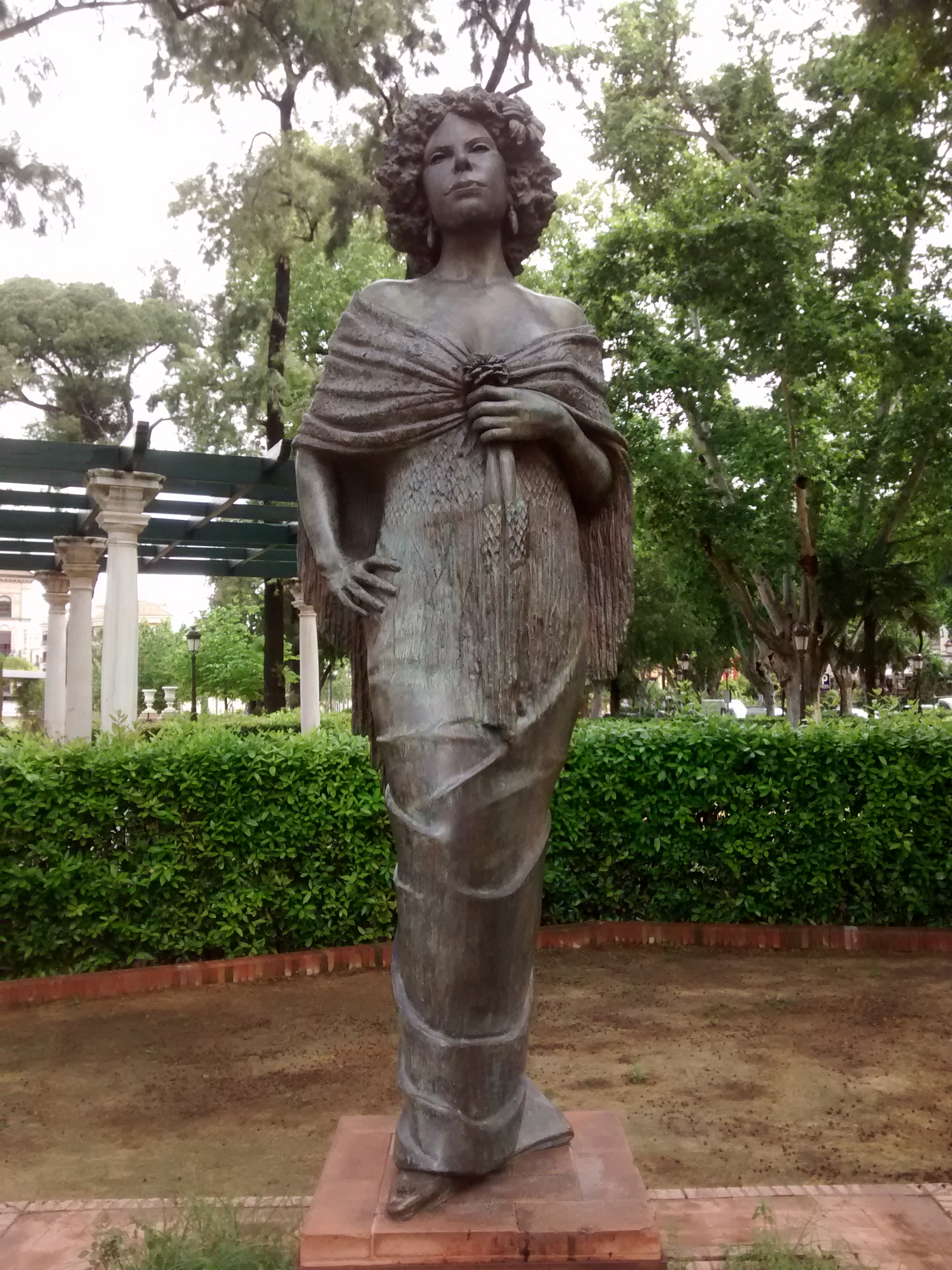
Statue in Seville

The Duchess died in the Palacio de las Dueñas on 20 November 2014, at the age of 88. She was succeeded by her son Carlos Fitz-James Stuart, 14th Duke of Huéscar, who thus became the 19th Duke of Alba. At the time of her death, her net worth was estimated to be $5 billion.

The Duchess's body was laid in repose at the Town Hall, where thousands of people paid their last respects. Pictures of the Duchess with her family were placed at her coffin. The King of Spain telephoned her son to pay his respects and sent two flower crowns to Seville. The Lord Mayor said that the flags of the city would be lowered in mourning. Juan José Asenjo and Curro Romero, and Mariano Rajoy, Spain's prime minister, also formally paid their respects. Her funeral was held at Seville Cathedral by Carlos Amigo Vallejo, where the Spanish Royal Family was represented by the Infanta Elena.

== Titles, honours and arms ==
=== Titles ===
As head of the dynasty, Cayetana Fitz-James Stuart was styled by her most senior title of "Duchess of Alba", while having held over 50 other hereditary titles during her lifetime. She was 14 times a Grandee of Spain. According to Guinness World Records, she was the most titled aristocrat in the world.

Dukedoms

- 18th Duchess of Alba, Grandee of Spain
- 15th Duchess of Aliaga, Grandee of Spain -Ceded to her son Don Alfonso
- 4th Duchess of Arjona, Grandee of Spain -Ceded to her son Don Cayetano
- 11th Duchess of Berwick, Grandee of Spain
- 17th Duchess of Híjar, Grandee of Spain -Ceded to her son Don Alfonso
- 11th Duchess of Liria and Jérica, Grandee of Spain
- 11th Duchess of Montoro, Grandee of Spain -Ceded to her daughter Doña Eugenia

Count-dukedoms

- 12th Countess-Duchess of Olivares, Grandee of Spain

Coat of arms of Cayetana, 18th Duchess of Alba

Marquessates

- 17th Marchioness of Carpio, Grandee of Spain
- 10th Marchioness of San Vicente del Barco, Grandee of Spain -Ceded to her son Don Fernando
- 16th Marchioness of La Algaba
- 16th Marchioness of Almenara -Ceded to her son Don Alfonso
- 18th Marchioness of Barcarrota
- 10th Marchioness of Castañeda
- 23rd Marchioness of Coria
- 14th Marchioness of Eliche
- 16th Marchioness of Mirallo
- 20th Marchioness of la Mota
- 20th Marchioness of Moya
- 17th Marchioness of Orani -Ceded to her son Don Alfonso
- 12th Marchioness of Osera
- 14th Marchioness of San Leonardo
- 19th Marchioness of Sarria
- 12th Marchioness of Tarazona
- 15th Marchioness of Valdunquillo
- 18th Marchioness of Villanueva del Fresno
- 17th Marchioness of Villanueva del Río

Countships

- 27th Countess of Aranda, Grandee of Spain -Ceded to her son Don Alfonso
- 22nd Countess of Lemos, Grandee of Spain
- 20th Countess of Lerín, Grandee of Spain, Constabless of Navarre
- 20th Countess of Miranda del Castañar, Grandee of Spain
- 16th Countess of Monterrey, Grandee of Spain
- 20th Countess of Osorno, Grandee of Spain
- 18th Countess of Palma del Río, Grandee of Spain -Ceded to her son Don Alfonso
- 12th Countess of Salvatierra, Grandee of Spain -Ceded to her son Don Cayetano
- 22nd Countess of Siruela, Grandee of Spain -Ceded to her son Don Jacobo
- 19th Countess of Andrade
- 14th Countess of Ayala
- 16th Countess of Casarrubios del Monte
- 16th Countess of Fuentes de Valdepero
- 11th Countess of Fuentidueña
- 17th Countess of Galve
- 18th Countess of Gelves
- 16th Countess of Guimerá -Ceded to her son Don Alfonso
- 21st Countess of Modica (Kingdom of Sicily)
- 24th Countess of Ribadeo -Ceded to her son Don Alfonso
- 25th Countess of San Esteban de Gormaz
- 12th Countess of Santa Cruz de la Sierra
- 20th Countess of Villalba

Viscountcies

- 12th Viscountess of la Calzada

Lordships

- 29th Lady of Moguer

=== Honours ===
Country	Appointment	Ribbon	Post-nominal letters	Notes
Kingdom of Spain	Dame Grand Cross of the Royal Order of Isabella the Catholic		GYC	
Kingdom of Spain	Dame Grand Cross of the Civil Order of Alfonso X, the Wise			
Kingdom of Spain	Dame of the Royal and Military Order of Saint Hermenegild			
Kingdom of Spain	Dame Grand Cross of the Order of Alcántara			
Kingdom of Spain	Dame Grand Cross of the Civil Order of Charity			
Kingdom of Spain	Dame Grand Cross of the Civil Order of Agricultural Merit			
Kingdom of Spain	Recipient of the Medal of Andalusia			
Kingdom of Spain	Recipient of the Medal of Concepción			
Kingdom of Spain	Recipient of the Medal of Línea			
Kingdom of Spain	Recipient of the Medal of The Community of Madrid			
Kingdom of Spain	Former Grand Master Recipient of the Medal of The Spanish Red Cross			
Kingdom of Spain	Recipient of the Medal of Suffering for the Motherland			
Greek Royal Family	Dame Grand Cross of the Order of Beneficence			
House of Bourbon-Two Sicilies	Dame Grand Cross of Justice of the Calabrian Two Sicilian Order of Saint George			
Japan	Member 4th Class (Wistaria) of the Order of the Precious Crown			

=== Honorary appointments ===
National honorary appointments

- Castilla-La Mancha: Marshal of Castilla-La Mancha
- Aragon: Constable of Aragon
- (Valencian Community) Llíria: Honorary Mayor of Llíria
- Seville: Knight of the Royal Cavalry Armory of Seville
- Spain: Honorary President of the Spanish Red Cross
- Spain: Honorary President of the Spanish National Orchestra
- Spain: Honorary President of the Real Academia de Bellas Artes de San Fernando

Foreign honorary appointments

- United States: Member of the Hispanic Society of America
- United States: Member of the American Academy of Arts and Sciences

Spanish nobility
Preceded by María del Rosario de Silva	Duchess of Aliaga; 11 January 1935 – 23 April 1954	Succeeded by Alfonso Martínez de Irujo
Preceded by María del Rosario de Silva	Marchioness of San Vicente del Barco; 11 January 1935 – 26 January 1994	Succeeded by Fernando Martínez de Irujo
Preceded by Jacobo Fitz-James Stuart	Duchess of Montoro; 28 January 1947 – 24 November 1994	Succeeded by Eugenia Martínez de Irujo
Preceded by Jacobo Fitz-James Stuart	Duchess of Alba, et cetera 18 February 1955 – 20 November 2014	Succeeded by Carlos Fitz-James Stuart
Preceded by Jacobo Fitz-James Stuart	Countess of Siruela; 18 February 1955 – 9 June 1982	Succeeded by Jacobo Fitz-James Stuart
Preceded by Alfonso de Silva	Duchess of Híjar; 31 December 1957 – 2 April 2013	Succeeded by Alfonso Martínez de Irujo
Preceded by Alfonso de Silva	Countess of Salvatierra; 31 December 1957 – 26 January 1994	Succeeded by Cayetano Martínez de Irujo
Italian nobility
Preceded by Jacobo Fitz-James Stuart	Count of Modica; 18 February 1955 – 20 November 2014	Succeeded by Carlos Fitz-James Stuart
