= Carlos Miguel Fitz-James Stuart, 14th Duke of Alba =

Spanish aristocrat

The Most Excellent Carlos Miguel Fitz-James Stuart 14th Duke of Alba GE (more...)
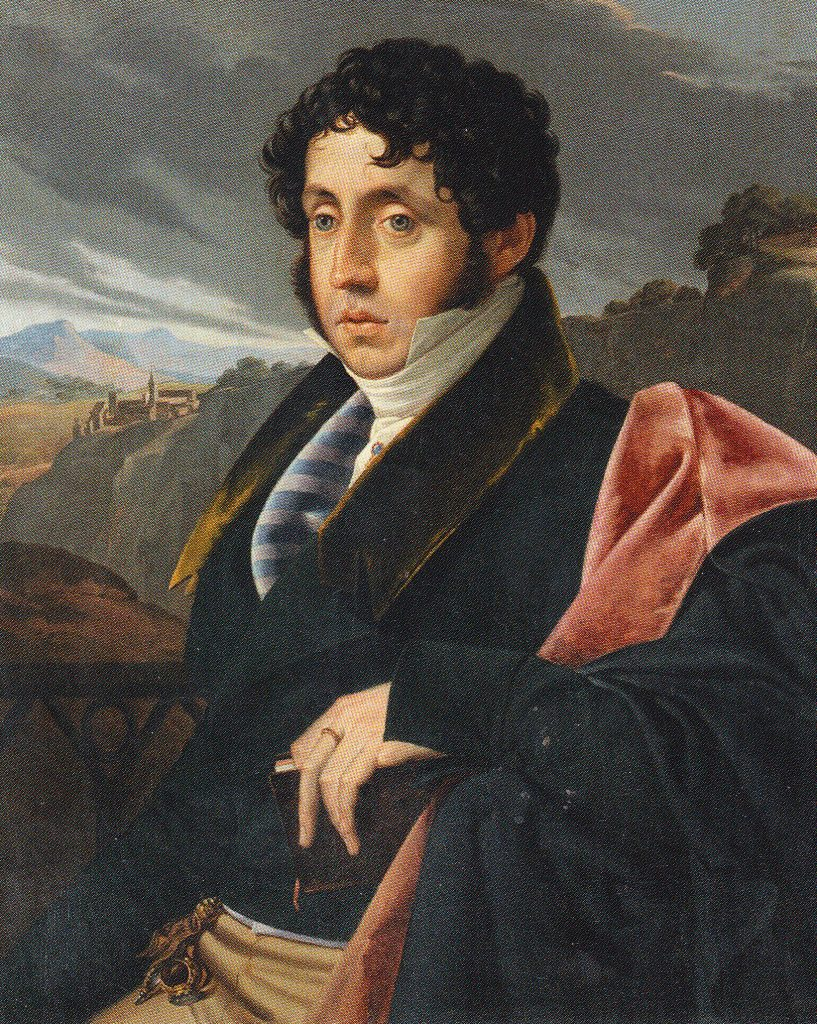
- Portrait by Antonio Calliano
- Born: Carlos Miguel Fitz-James Stuart y Silva; 19 May 1794; Madrid, Spain
- Died: 7 October 1835 (aged 41); Sion, Switzerland
- Spouse: Rosalia Ventimiglia di Grammonte
- Children: Jacobo Stuart-FitzJames, 8th Duke of Liria y Xerica; Enrique FitzJames-Stuart y Ventimiglia, Count of Galve; Luis Fernando FitzJames-Stuart y Ventimiglia
- Parents: Jacobo Fitz-James Stuart, 5th Duke of Liria and Jérica (father); Maria Teresa Fernandez de Silva y de Palafóx (mother)
- Family: House of Alba branch of Fitz-James Stuart

Carlos Miguel Fitz-James Stuart y Silva, 14th Duke of Alba, GE (19 May 1794 – 7 October 1835) was a Spanish aristocrat.

== Biography ==
Born in Madrid, Spain, in 1794, Carlos was a descendant of James FitzJames, 1st Duke of Berwick and through him, the exiled King James II of England & VII of Scotland. He was the second surviving son of the 5th Duke of Berwick; his older brother, Jacobo Fitz-James Stuart, briefly inherited their father's titles, until his death on 5 January 1795 at the age of 3.

Carlos was a Knight of the Order of the Golden Fleece of Spain. In 1802, the childless 13th Duchess of Alba died; as the duchess' third cousin once removed, he became the 14th Duke of Alba, as well as Grandee of Spain of ten counties.

In 1819, he married the Italian noblewoman Rosalia Ventimiglia di Grammonte y Moncada (Palermo, 1798–1868). from the Ventimiglia, Princes of Grammonte, in Palermo.

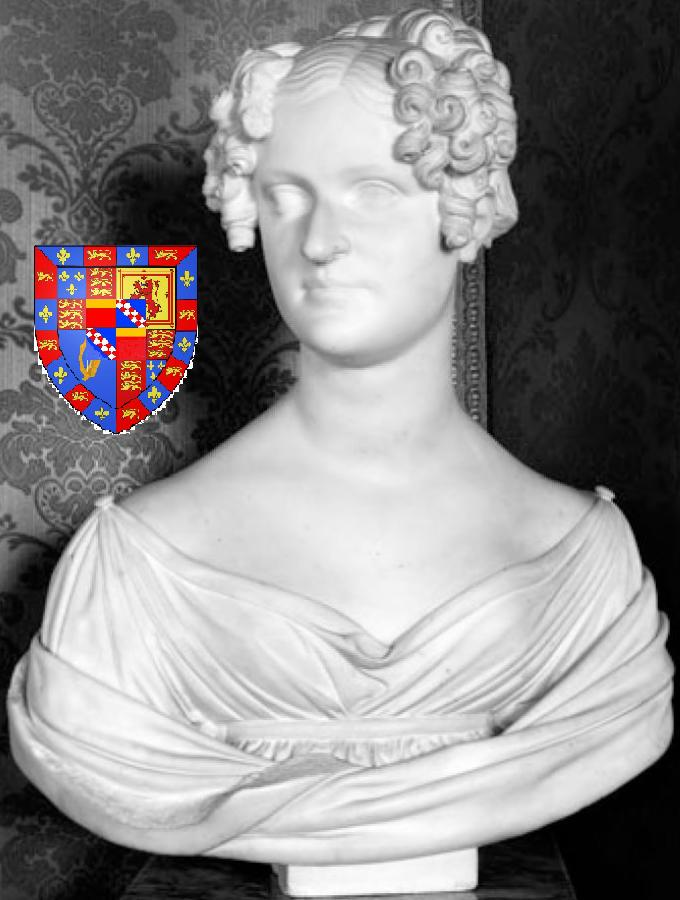
The 14th Duke of Alba's wife, Rosalía Ventimiglia y Moncada (1798–1868). Sculpture by Lorenzo Bartolini (1777–1850), Madrid, Fundación Casa de Alba, Palacio de Liria.

They had three children:

- Jacopo Fitz-James Stuart y Ventimiglia, Palermo, Italy, (1821–1881) who married in 1844 to Maria Francisca Portocarrero Palafox y Kirkpatrick (1825–1860), eldest sister of Eugénie de Montijo (1826–1920), the Spanish wife of Emperor Napoleon III of France (1808–1873).
- Enrique Fitz-James Stuart y Ventimiglia, Count of Galve (5 October 1826 - 28 April 1882), after his father's death in 1835. He married Adelaida Ivanovna Basilevskaya in 1871. The title of Count of Galve was first awarded in 1557; after Enrique's death, it fell to Carlos María Fitz-James Stuart, 16th Duke of Alba, Enrique's great nephew.
- Luis Fernando FitzJames-Stuart y Ventimiglia.

Carlos Miguel Fitz-James Stuart died aged 41 on 7 October 1835, in Sion, Switzerland, and was succeeded as Duke of Alba in that year by his eldest son.

== Titles ==
- 14th Duke of Alba, Grandee of Spain
- 7th Duke of Berwick, Grandee of Spain (Jacobite as well Spanish title)
- 12th Duke of Huéscar, Grandee of Spain
- 7th Duke of Liria and Jérica, Grandee of Spain
- 7th Duke of Montoro, Grandee of Spain
- 10th Count-Duke of Olivares, Grandee of Spain
- 12th Marquess of Carpio, Grandee of Spain
- 10th Marquess of Eliche
- 13th Marquess of Villanueva del Río
- 14th Count of Gelves
- 17th Count of Modica (Sicilian title)
- 7th Earl of Tinmouth (Jacobite title)
- 7th Baron Bosworth (Jacobite title)

== Ancestry ==
Carlos Miguel Fitz-James Stuart was a direct descendant of the King James II of England through his illegitimate son James FitzJames, 1st Duke of Berwick by his mistress Arabella Churchill.

Ancestors of Carlos Miguel Fitz-James Stuart, 14th Duke of Alba

8. James Fitz-James Stuart, 3rd Duke of Berwick
4. Carlos Fitz-James Stuart, 4th Duke of Berwick
9. Maria Teresa de Silva
2. Jacobo Fitz-James Stuart, 5th Duke of Berwick
10. Prince Gustav Adolf of Stolberg-Gedern
5. Princess Caroline of Stolberg-Gedern
11. Princess Elisabeth Philippine of Hornes
1. Carlos Miguel Fitz-James Stuart, 14th Duke of Alba
12. Joaquin Diego Fernández de Hijar Silva, 8th Duke of Hijar
6. Pedro Fernández de Hijar Silva, 9th Duke of Hijar,
13. Maria Engracia Abarca de Bolea
3. Maria Teresa Fernandez de Hijar Silva
14. Joaquin Antonio de Palafox, 6th Marquis of Arizza
7. Rafaela de Palafox
15. Princess Marie Anne Charlotte de Croÿ

Spanish nobility
Preceded by María Cayetana de Silva	Duke of Alba, et cetera 1802 – 1835	Jacobo Fitz-James Stuart
Peerage of England
Preceded by Jacobo Fitz-James Stuart	Duke of Berwick, et cetera 1802 – 1835	Jacobo Fitz-James Stuart
Italian nobility
Preceded by María Cayetana de Silva	Count of Modica; 1802 – 1835	Jacobo Fitz-James Stuart
