= Duke of Arjona =

Hereditary title in the Peerage of Spain

Dukedom of Arjona
- Creation date: 1423
- Created by: John II
- Peerage: Peerage of Spain
- First holder: Fadrique Enríquez de Castilla, 1st Duke of Arjona
- Present holder: Cayetano Martínez de Irujo y Fitz-James Stuart, 4th Duke of Arjona
- Heir apparent: Luis Martínez de Irujo y Casanova

Duke of Arjona (Spanish: Duque de Arjona) is a hereditary title in the Peerage of Spain, accompanied by the dignity of Grandee and granted in 1423 by John II to Fadrique Enríquez de Castilla, Count of Trastámara and a great-grandchild of Alfonso XI.

It was rehabilitated by Alfonso XIII in 1902 in favour of Jacobo Fitz-James Stuart, 17th Duke of Alba, who was the heir of the House of Lemos, and by extension, of the Dukedom of Arjona, one of the oldest titles in Spain.

The title's name refers to the municipality of Arjona in the Province of Jaén, Andalusia, Spain.

== Dukes of Arjona (1423) ==
- Fadrique Enríquez de Castilla, 1st Duke of Arjona
- Jacobo Fitz-James Stuart y Falcó, 2nd Duke of Arjona
- Cayetana Fitz-James Stuart y Silva, 3rd Duchess of Arjona
- Cayetano Martínez de Irujo y Fitz-James Stuart, 4th Duke of Arjona

== See also ==
- Count of Salvatierra
- List of dukes in the peerage of Spain
- List of current grandees of Spain
