= Duke of Liria and Jérica =

Dukedom of Spain

Dukedom of Liria and Jérica
- Creation date: December 13, 1707
- Created by: Philip V
- Peerage: Peerage of Spain
- First holder: James FitzJames
- Present holder: Carlos Fitz-James Stuart
- Seat: Liria Palace (Madrid)

Duke of Liria and Jérica (Spanish: Duque de Liria y Jérica) is a title of Spanish nobility, accompanied by the dignity of Grandee of Spain, created the 13 of December of 1707 by King Philip V of Spain for James FitzJames, the illegitimate son of King James II and Arabella Churchill.

Its name refers to the towns of Liria, located in the Province of Valencia, and Jérica, located in the Province of Castellón.

Its original denomination, at the time of its concession was "Duke of Liria and Xérica".

== Dukes of Liria and Jérica (1707–present) ==
- James FitzJames, 1st Duke of Liria and Xérica
- James Fitz-James Stuart, 2nd Duke of Liria and Xérica
- Jacobo Fitz-James Stuart, 3rd Duke of Liria and Xérica
- Carlos Fitz-James Stuart, 4th Duke of Liria and Jérica
- Jacobo Fitz-James Stuart, 5th Duke of Liria and Jérica
- Jacobo Fitz-James Stuart, 6th Duke of Liria and Jérica
- Carlos Miguel Fitz-James Stuart, 7th Duke of Liria and Jérica
- Jacobo Fitz-James Stuart, 8th Duke of Liria and Jérica
- Carlos María Fitz-James Stuart, 9th Duke of Liria and Jérica
- Jacobo Fitz-James Stuart, 10th Duke of Liria and Jérica
- Cayetana Fitz-James Stuart, 11th Duchess of Liria and Jérica
- Carlos Fitz-James Stuart, 12th Duke of Liria and Jérica

== See also ==
- List of dukes in the peerage of Spain
- List of current grandees of Spain
