= Duke of Berwick =

There are two titles: one English, the other Spanish

Dukedom of Berwick
- Upper: arms of the Dukedom of Berwick in the peerage of England (1687–1695); Lower: arms of the Dukedom of Berwick in the peerage of Spain (1707–present)
- Creation date: 1687 (created English title); 1707 (confirmed Spanish title)
- Created by: James II; Philip V
- Peerage: Peerage of England; Peerage of Spain
- First holder: James FitzJames
- Present holder: Jacobo Hernando Fitz-James Stuart y Gómez (English title); Carlos Fitz-James Stuart y Martínez de Irujo (Spanish title)
- Heir apparent: Luis Esteban Fitz-James Stuart y Gómez, 14th Marquess of Valderrábano (English title); Fernando Fitz-James Stuart, 17th Duke of Huéscar (Spanish title)
- Remainder to: the 1st Duke's heirs male of the body lawfully begotten (English title) the 10th Duke's heirs, both male or female (Spanish title)
- Subsidiary titles: Peerage of England only: Earl of Tinmouth; Baron Bosworth
- Seat: Liria Palace

Duke of Berwick (/ˈbɛrɪk/) (Spanish: Duque de Berwick) is a title that was created in the Peerage of England on 19 March 1687 for James FitzJames, the illegitimate son of James II and VII, King of England, Scotland, and Ireland and Arabella Churchill. The title's name refers to the town of Berwick-upon-Tweed in England, near the border with Scotland.

Its creation is not considered part of the illegitimate Jacobite peerage, and no Writ of attainder was issued by Parliament for the Dukedom (although it was for the Duke himself), the title is still considered by some as theoretically extant, albeit dormant, in the Peerage of England and could be petitioned for reinstatement by the legitimate heirs male of the body (as detailed below in the list of Jacobite succession).

Since 13 December 1707, when Philip V of Spain confirmed the title in his kingdom, and conferred the dignity of Grandee to the 1st Duke of Berwick, the dukedom is also a title of the Spanish nobility. Unlike the English peerage, however, the Spanish title follows the rule of absolute primogeniture, which allows the first‑born child to inherit regardless of gender (female or male). As a result, when the 10th Duke of Berwick died in September 1953 leaving only a daughter, the succession split into two separate lines.

At this point, under English agnatic primogeniture, the English title passed to the nephew of the 10th Duke, Don Fernando Fitz-James Stuart y Saavedra, 19th Duke of Peñaranda (1922–1971). He was succeeded by his son, Don Jacobo Fitz-James Stuart y Gómez, 20th Duke of Peñaranda (born 1947), who became the 12th Duke of Berwick in 1971. The heir presumptive to the English dukedom is his younger brother, Don Luis Fitz‑James Stuart y Gómez, 14th Marquess of Valderrábano (born 1950). As neither Jacobo nor Luis has male issue, the English peerage is expected to become extinct.

In contrast, the Spanish title passed in 1953 to the 10th Duke’s only daughter, Doña Cayetana Fitz-James Stuart, 18th Duchess of Alba (1926-2014), who thereby became the 11th Duchess of Berwick in her own right. Upon her death in 2014, her son Don Carlos Fitz-James Stuart, 19th Duke of Alba (born 1948), inherited the title. The heir apparent to the dukedom is his eldest son Don Fernando Fitz-James Stuart, 17th Duke of Huéscar (born 1990).

== History ==
The peerage and its subsidiary titles were generally considered to have been forfeit by the English parliament in 1695, when James FitzJames was attainted following the enforced exile of his father. The College of Arms in its Roll of the Peerage does not list any such title, which means that it is non-existent today in England.

Nevertheless, the titles were recognized in France as de facto Jacobite peerages by Louis XIV, King of France to please the exiled James II & VII, along with other Jacobite peerages recognized in France, like Duke of Perth, Duke of Melfort, etc. On 13 December 1707, Philip V confirmed or issued the title in Spain, and he conferred the dignity of Grandee of Spain on James FitzJames, 1st Duke of Berwick. The grandeeship is attached to the Spanish title of Duke of Berwick.

If the English peerage title was still extant, that title is only inheritable in the male line. At the death of Don Jacobo Fitz-James Stuart, 17th Duke of Alba and 10th Duke of Berwick, the English title would have been inherited by his nephew Don Fernando FitzJames Stuart, 15th Duke of Peñaranda de Duero (1922–1971), and subsequently by Fernando's son Don Jacobo FitzJames Stuart, 16th Duke of Peñaranda de Duero and current head of the House of FitzJames (born in 1947 and without children).

The Spanish title, with the accompanying dignity of Grandee of Spain, follows the inheritance rules of that country. Spanish noble titles historically have followed the rule of male-preference primogeniture, which allows a female to succeed if she has no living brothers and no deceased brothers who left surviving legitimate descendants. With the death of the 10th Duke of Berwick in September 1953, his only child, Doña Cayetana Fitz-James Stuart, 18th Duchess of Alba, succeeded him in his Spanish titles, including the Spanish dukedom of Berwick. With her death in November 2014, the dukedom passed to her eldest son, Don Carlos Fitz-James Stuart y Martínez de Irujo.

== Dukes of Berwick (1687–1695) ==
Descendant	Portrait	Birth	Marriages	Death
James FitzJames, 1st Duke of Berwick; 1670–1695		21 August 1670; Moulins, Allier son of James II of England and Arabella Churchill	Honora de Burgh, Countess de Lucan; 26 March 1695; 1 child Anne Bulkeley; 18 April 1700; 10 children	12 June 1734; Philippsburg aged 63

== Jacobite Dukes of Berwick (1695–present) ==
Descendant	Portrait	Birth	Marriages	Death
James FitzJames, 1st Duke of Berwick; 1695–1734		21 August 1670; Moulins, Allier son of James II of England and Arabella Churchill	Honora de Burgh, Countess de Lucan; 26 March 1695; 1 child Anne Bulkeley; 18 April 1700; 10 children	12 June 1734; Philippsburg aged 63
James Fitz-James Stuart, 2nd Duke of Berwick; 1734–1738		21 October 1696 son of James FitzJames, 1st Duke of Berwick and Honora de Burgh, Countess de Lucan	Catalina Colón de Portugal y Ayala, 9th condesa de Gelves; 31 December 1716; 6 children	2 June 1738; Naples aged 41
Jacobo Fitz-James Stuart, 3rd Duke of Berwick; 1738–1785		28 December 1718; Madrid son of James Fitz-James Stuart, 2nd Duke of Berwick and Catalina Colón de Portugal y Ayala, 9th condesa de Gelves	María Teresa de Silva y Alvarez de Toledo; 26 June 1738; 1 child	30 September 1785; Valencia aged 66
Carlos Fitz-James Stuart, 4th Duke of Berwick; 1785–1787		25 March 1752; Liria son of James Fitz-James Stuart, 3rd Duke of Berwick and María Teresa de Silva y Álvarez de Toledo	Carolina Augusta, Prinzessin zu Stolberg-Gedern; 15 September 1771; 2 children	7 September 1787; Madrid aged 35
Jacobo Fitz-James Stuart, 5th Duke of Berwick; 1787–1794		25 February 1773; Paris son of Carlos FitzJames Stuart, 4th Duke of Berwick and Carolina Augusta, Prinzessin zu Stolberg-Gedern	María Teresa de Silva Fernández de Híjar y Palafox; 24 January 1790; 2 children	3 April 1794 died aged 21
Jacobo Fitz-James Stuart, 6th Duke of Berwick; 1794–1795		3 January 1792 son of Jacobo FitzJames Stuart, 5th Duke of Berwick and María Teresa de Silva Fernández de Híjar y Palafox	never married	5 January 1795 aged 3
Carlos Fitz-James Stuart, 7th Duke of Berwick; 1795–1835		19 May 1794; Madrid son of Jacobo FitzJames Stuart, 5th Duke of Berwick and María Teresa de Silva Fernández de Híjar y Palafox	Rosalia Ventimiglia e Moncada, nobile dei principi di Grammonte; 15 February 1817; 3 children	7 October 1835; Sion aged 41
Jacobo Fitz-James Stuart, 8th Duke of Berwick; 1835–1881		3 June 1821; Palermo son of Carlos FitzJames Stuart, 7th Duke of Berwick and Rosalia Ventimiglia e Moncada, nobile dei principi di Grammonte	María Francisca Portocarrero Palafox y Kirck Patrick, 12th duquesa de Peñaranda; 14 February 1848; 3 children	10 July 1881; Madrid aged 60
Carlos Fitz-James Stuart, 9th Duke of Berwick; 1881–1901		4 December 1849; Madrid son of Jacobo FitzJames Stuart, 8th Duke of Berwick and María Francisca Portocarrero Palafox y Kirck Patrick, 12th duquesa de Peñaranda	María del Rosario Falcó y Osorio, 12th condesa de Siruela; 10 December 1877; 3 children	15 October 1901; New York City aged 51
Jacobo Fitz-James Stuart, 10th Duke of Berwick; 1901–1953		17 October 1878; Madrid son of Carlos FitzJames Stuart, 9th Duke of Berwick and María del Rosario Falcó y Osorio, 12th condesa de Siruela	María del Rosario de Silva y Gurtubay, 9th marquesa de San Vicente del Barco; 7 October 1920; 1 child	24 September 1953; Lausanne aged 74
Fernando Fitz-James Stuart, 11th Duke of Berwick; 1953–1970		24 January 1922; El Guadalperal nephew of Jacobo Fitz-James Stuart, 17th Duke of Alba, son of Carlos Fernando Fitz-James Stuart y Falcó, 14th duque de Peñaranda, grandson of the 9th Duke of Berwick, and María del Carmen de Saavedra y Collado, 13th marquesa de Villaviciosa	María Isabel Gómez y Ruiz; 1944; 4 children	20 July 1970; El Guadalperal aged 48
Jacobo Fitz-James Stuart, 12th Duke of Berwick; 1970–present		15 November 1947 son of Fernando Fitz-James Stuart, 11th Duke of Berwick and María Isabel Gómez y Ruiz	Marta Gómez-Acebo Calonje no issue	

== Spanish Dukes of Berwick (1707–present) ==
Before 1953, the Spanish Dukes were also the Jacobite Dukes of Berwick. The line split due to the differences between the Spanish and Jacobite succession laws (male-preference primogeniture and agnatic primogeniture respectively).

Descendant	Portrait	Birth	Marriages	Death
Cayetana Fitz-James Stuart, 11th Duchess of Berwick; 1953–2014		28 March 1926; Liria Palace, Madrid daughter of Jacobo Fitz-James Stuart, 10th Duke of Berwick, and María del Rosario de Silva, 9th Marquise of San Vicente del Barco	Honorable Luis Martínez de Irujo y Artázcoz m. 1947; dec. 1972 with him 6 children Jesús Aguirre y Ortiz de Zárate m. 1978; dec. 2001 Alfonso Díez Carabantes m. 2011	20 November 2014; Palacio de las Dueñas, Seville aged 88
Carlos Fitz-James Stuart, 12th Duke of Berwick; 2014–present		2 October 1948; Madrid son of Cayetana Fitz-James Stuart, 11th Duchess of Berwick, and Don Luis Martínez de Irujo y Artázcoz	Doña Matilde de Solís-Beaumont y Martínez-Campos m. 1988; div. 2004 with whom he had 2 children	
