= Jacobo Fitz-James Stuart, 15th Duke of Alba =

Spanish nobleman (1821–1881)

The Most Excellent Jacobo Fitz-James Stuart 15th Duke of Alba GE (more...)
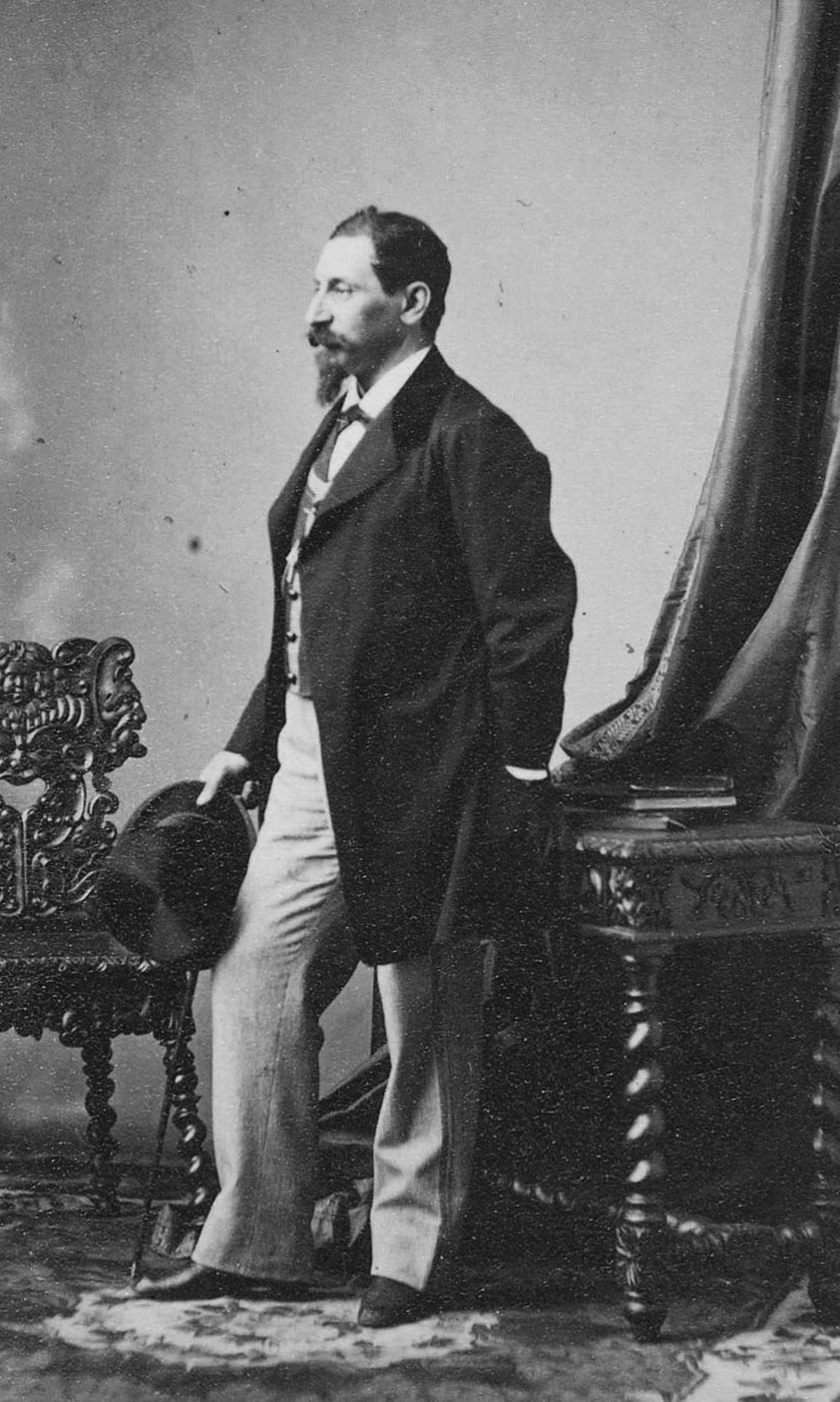
- Portrait 1860
- Born: Jacobo Fitz-James Stuart y Ventimiglia; 3 January 1821; Palermo, Kingdom of the Two Sicilies
- Died: 10 July 1881 (aged 60); Madrid, Spain
- Spouse: María Francisca de Sales Portocarrero, 16th Duchess of Peñaranda (m. 1848; died 1860)
- Children: Carlos María Fitz-James Stuart, 16th Duke of Alba
- Parents: Carlos Miguel Fitz-James Stuart (father); Rosalia Ventimiglia dei Principi di Grammonte (mother)
- Family: House of Alba branch of Fitz-James Stuart

Jacobo Fitz-James Stuart y Ventimiglia, 15th Duke of Alba, GE (3 June 1821 – 10 July 1881) was a Spanish nobleman. He was a brother-in-law of Napoleon III through his wife, sister of Empress Eugenie.

== Biography ==
He was the son of Carlos Miguel Fitz-James Stuart, 14th Duke of Alba and Rosalia Ventimiglia dei Principi di Grammonte. He married at Madrid, on 14 February 1848 María Francisca de Sales de Palafox Portocarrero y Kirkpatrick, 16th Duchess of Peñaranda de Duero and daughter of Cipriano de Palafox y Portocarrero, the 8th Count of Montijo. They had three children:

- Carlos Maria Fitz-James Stuart y Portocarrero-Palafox, 16th Duke of Alba (among other titles), born 4 December 1848.
- María de la Asuncion Fitz-James-Stuart y Portocarrero-Palafox, 3rd Duchess of Galisteo, born 17 August 1851.
- María Luisa Fitz-James Stuart y Portocarrero-Palafox, 19ª Duchess of Montoroso, born 19 October 1853.

== Titles, styles, honours and arms ==
=== Titles ===
The co-lateral titles of this 15 Duke of Alba were:

- 15th Duke of Alba
- 13th Duke of Huéscar
- 8th Duke of Berwick
- 8th Duke of Liria and Jérica
- 8th Duke of Montoro
- 11th Count-Duke of Olivares
- 11th Marquess of Elche
- 14th Marquess of Villanueva del Río
- 13th Marquess of Carpio
- 15th Count of Gelves
- 18th Count of Modica
- Órdenes
- Great Cross of the Portuguese Order of N.S. da Conceição de Vila Viçosa (188) - 1868.

Spanish nobility
Preceded by Carlos Miguel Fitz-James Stuart	Duke of Alba, et cetera 1835 – 1881	Succeeded by Carlos María Fitz-James Stuart
Peerage of England
Preceded by Carlos Miguel Fitz-James Stuart	Duke of Berwick, et cetera 1835 – 1881	Succeeded by Carlos María Fitz-James Stuart
Italian nobility
Preceded by Carlos Miguel Fitz-James Stuart	Count of Modica; 1835 – 1881	Succeeded by Carlos María Fitz-James Stuart
