= Jacobo Fitz-James Stuart, 17th Duke of Alba =

Spanish noble

The Most Excellent The Duke of Alba GE LH GCVO
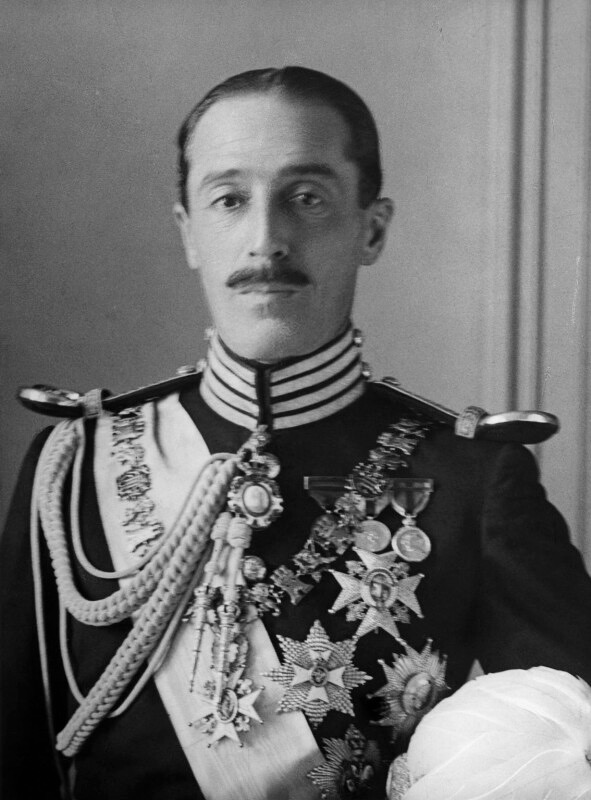
- Photographed in Real Maestranza de Sevilla uniform, 1937

Minister of State of Spain
- In office 30 January 1930 – 18 February 1931
- Monarch: Alfonso XIII
- Prime Minister: Dámaso Berenguer
- Preceded by: Miguel Primo de Rivera
- Succeeded by: Álvaro de Figueroa

Minister of Public Instruction and Fine Arts of Spain
- In office 30 January – 24 February 1930
- Monarch: Alfonso XIII
- Prime Minister: Dámaso Berenguer
- Preceded by: Eduardo Callejo de la Cuesta
- Succeeded by: Elías Tormo

Representative of the Nationalist Faction in the United Kingdom
- In office 21 November 1937 – 8 March 1939
- Generalísimo: Francisco Franco
- Deputy Prime Minister: Francisco Gómez-Jordana

Ambassador of Spain to the United Kingdom
- In office 1939–1942
- Caudillo: Francisco Franco
- Prime Minister: Francisco Franco
- Minister of Foreign Affairs: Francisco Gómez-Jordana; Juan Luis Beigbeder; Ramón Serrano Suñer
- Preceded by: Pablo de Azcárate
- Succeeded by: José Ruiz de Arana y Bauer

Seat of the Real Academia Española
- In office 14 March 1943 – 24 September 1953
- Preceded by: Manuel de Saralegui y Medina
- Succeeded by: Pedro Laín Entralgo

Personal details
- Born: Jacobo Fitz-James Stuart y Falcó; 17 October 1878 Madrid, Spain
- Died: 24 September 1953 (aged 74) Lausanne, Switzerland
- Spouse: María del Rosario de Silva, Duchess of Alba (m. 1920; died 1934)
- Children: Cayetana Fitz-James Stuart, 18th Duchess of Alba
- Parents: Carlos María Fitz-James Stuart, 16th Duke of Alba (father); María del Rosario, 22nd Countess of Siruela (mother)

Medal record

Men's Polo

Representing Spain

Olympic Games
Silver medal – second place	1920 Antwerp	Team competition

Jacobo Fitz-James Stuart y Falcó, 17th Duke of Alba, 10th Duke of Berwick, GE, LH, GCVO (17 October 1878 – 24 September 1953) was a Spanish peer, diplomat, politician, art collector and Olympic medalist. He was one of the most important aristocrats of his time and held, among other titles, the dukedoms of Alba de Tormes and Berwick, the Countship of Lemos, Lerín, Montijo and the Marquessate of Carpio. He was granted the Order of the Golden Fleece of Spain in 1926.

A close friend and relative of the British royal family, he was one of the leading guests at the wedding of Queen Elizabeth II in 1947.

== Family ==
The Duke was born on 17 October 1878 in Palace of Liria in Madrid, the first son of Carlos María Fitz-James Stuart, 16th Duke of Alba and María del Rosario Falcó, 21st Countess of Siruela. He was descended from the Duke of Berwick, James FitzJames, himself a bastard son of King James II & VII and his mistress, Arabella Churchill. Don Jacobo was baptised only a few days after with the name "Santiago", a variant of Jacobo. His godparents were his paternal grandfather, Jacobo Fitz-James Stuart, 15th Duke of Alba and his maternal grandmother María del Pilar Ossorio y Gutiérrez de los Ríos, 3rd Duchess of Fernán Núñez.

On 7 October 1920 he married Maria del Rosario de Silva, 9th Marchioness of San Vicente del Barco (Madrid, 4 April 1900 – Madrid, 11 January 1934), lady of the bedchamber to Queen Victoria Eugenie and sole heiress to the enormous fortune and long list of titles of the house of Híjar as the only child of Alfonso de Silva, 16th Duke of Híjar and her mother María del Rosario Gurtubay, at the Spanish Embassy in London. The two had a single daughter, Cayetana, who inherited all of the family's titles and fortune. Meanwhile, the Jacobite supporters rallied behind his nephew Fernando (the son of his late brother Hernando).

== Early years ==
He carried out his first studies under private tutors, but was later sent to England to study at Beaumont College, followed by Eton. After returning to Spain, he continued with his higher education enrolling in the Universidad Central de Madrid, where he obtained his bachelor's degree in law.

== Diplomatic career ==
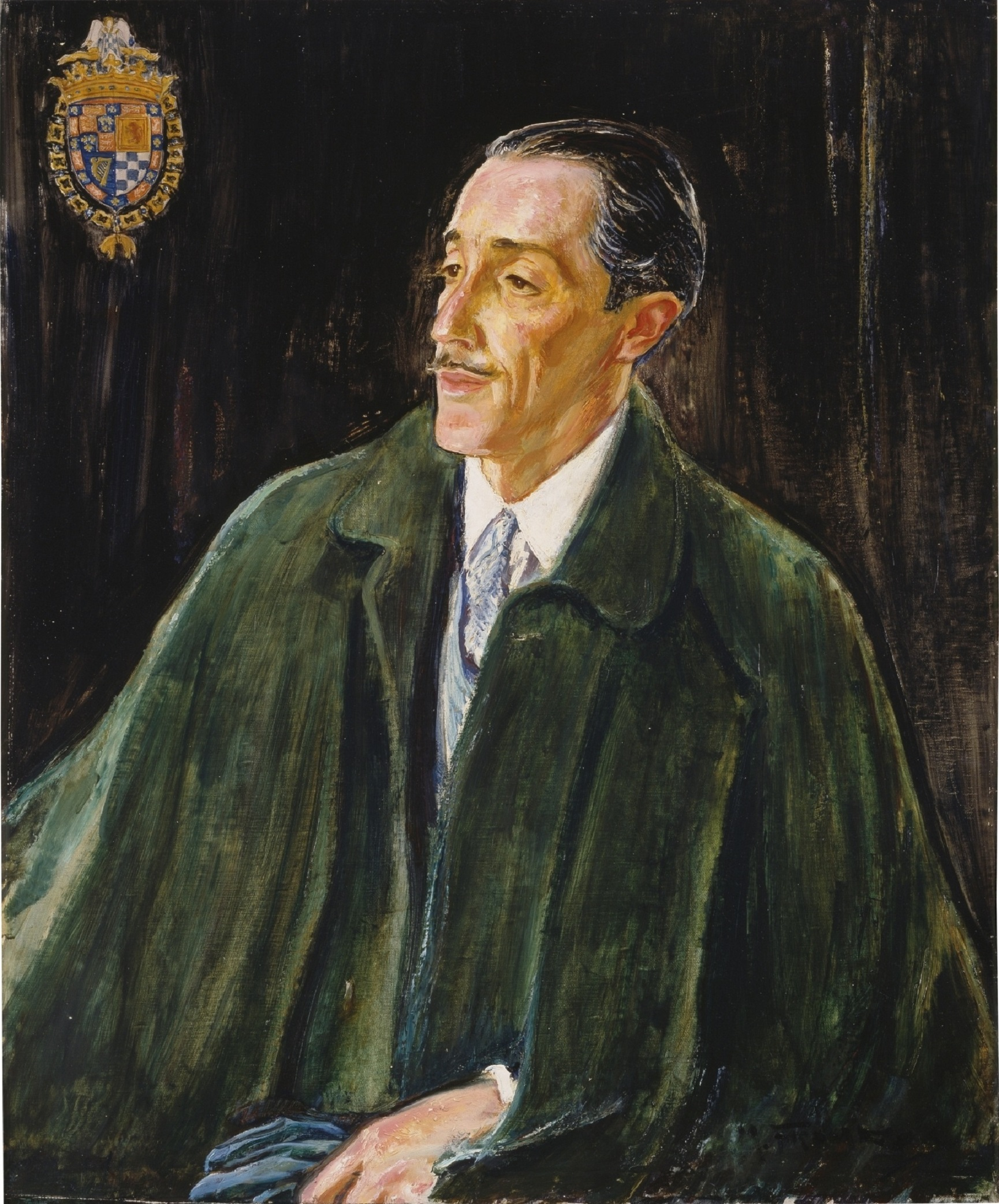
Portrait by Maurice Fromkes, 1925

He served as Lord of the Bedchamber to the young King Alfonso XIII, who had acceded on his birth. In May 1902, royal visitors came to Madrid for the festivities to mark the King's birthday and enthronement. The Duke received the Knight Grand Cross of the Royal Victorian Order (GCVO) from the Duke of Connaught, who was present for the festivities.

Between 2 February 1930 and 18 February 1931, Alba was Foreign Minister of Spain. During the Spanish Civil War, the Communists occupied his residence, the Palace of Liria, which his daughter later restored, and they murdered his younger brother Hernando Carlos María Teresa Fitz-James Stuart y Falcó (1882-1936).

Alba became General Franco's official representative in London and opened the new building at Campion Hall, University of Oxford, in June 1936, alongside Alban Goodier S.J., the former Archbishop of Bombay, and the Earl of Oxford. He was still the ambassador there in 1939, when Neville Chamberlain's cabinet formally gave to Franco's Nationalists diplomatic recognition.

The master Soviet spy Kim Philby wrote in his memoir My Silent War that the Spanish diplomatic bag during the Second World War was regularly accessed, "and from it [we] learnt that Alba periodically sent to Madrid despatches on the British political scene of quite exceptional quality. As we had no doubt that the Spanish Foreign Ministry would make them available to the German allies, these despatches represented a really serious leakage. Yet there was nothing that could be done. There was no evidence that the Duke had obtained his information improperly. He simply moved with people in the know and reported what they said, with shrewd commentaries of his own." In fact, King George VI was warned of this possibility in October 1943, as his Private Secretary Sir Alan Lascelles reported in his diary, and advised not to say anything that he did not want to reach the enemy.

After the war, Alba's relations with Franco markedly cooled, the result of Alba supporting a prompt monarchist restoration much more than Franco. Alba was a leading guest at the 1947 wedding of Princess Elizabeth and Philip, Duke of Edinburgh.

== Olympic career ==
He won a silver medal in polo at the 1920 Summer Olympics.

== Honors ==
- 1902: Knight Grand Cross Royal Victorian Order.
- 1925: Grand Cordon Order of Leopold.
- 1926: Knight Order of the Golden Fleece.

== Titles and styles ==
=== Titles ===
==== Dukedoms ====
- 17th Duke of Alba, Grandee of Spain
- 13th Duke of Huéscar, Grandee of Spain -Ceded to his grandson Don Carlos
- 10th Duke of Berwick, Grandee of Spain
- 10th Duke of Liria and Jérica, Grandee of Spain
- 10th Duke of Montoro, Grandee of Spain -Ceded to his daughter Doña Cayetana
- 2nd Duke of Arjona, Grandee of Spain

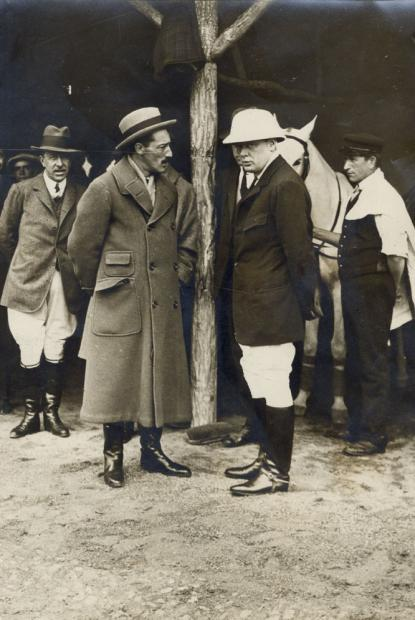
The Duke of Alba and Winston Churchill, his distant cousin, during a polo match in Casa de Campo, Madrid, 1914

==== Count-Dukedoms ====
- 11th Count-Duke Of Olivares, Grandee of Spain

==== Marquessates ====
- 17th Marquess of Carpio, Grandee of Spain
- 22nd Marquess of Coria
- 19th Marquess of Ardales -Ceded to his sister Doña Sol
- 19th Marquess of la Mota
- 19th Marquess of Moya
- 18th Marquess of Sarria
- 17th Marquess of Barcarrota
- 17th Marquess of Villanueva del Fresno
- 16th Marquess of Villanueva del Río
- 15th Marquess of la Albaga
- 13th Marquess of Eliche
- 13th Marquess of San Leonardo
- 11th Marquess of Osera
- 11th Marquess of Tarazona

==== Countships ====
- 21st Count of Lemos, Grandee of Spain
- 21st Count of Siruela, Grandee of Spain
- 19th Count of Lerín, Grandee of Spain, Constable of Navarre
- 11th Count of Montijo, Grandee of Spain
- 19th Count of Osorno, Grandee of Spain
- 15th Count of Monterrey, Grandee of Spain
- 13th Count of Baños, Grandee of Spain
- 24th Count of San Esteban de Gormaz
- 20th Count of Miranda del Castañar
- 20th Count of Modica (Kingdom of Sicily)
- 19th Count of Villalba
- 18th Count of Andrade
- 17th Count of Gelves
- 16th Count of Galve
- 15th Count of Casarrubios del Monte
- 15th Count of Fuentes de Valdepero
- 13th Count of Ayala
- 11th Count of Santa Cruz de la Sierra
- 10th Count of Fuentidueña
- 10th Earl of Tinmouth

==== Viscountcies ====
- 11th Viscount of la Calzada

==== Baronies ====
- 10th Baron Bosworth

=== Styles ===
- The Most Excellent The Duke of Huéscar (1878–1901)
- The Most Excellent The Duke of Alba de Tormes (1901–1953)

== Coat of arms ==
Heraldry of Jacobo Fitz-James Stuart y Falcó

Coat of arms of Jacobo Fitz-James Stuart y Falcó as Duke of Alba

Spanish nobility
Preceded by Carlos María Fitz-James Stuart	Duke of Alba, et cetera 1902–1953	Succeeded by Cayetana Fitz-James Stuart
Preceded by Carlos María Fitz-James Stuart	Duke of Berwick; 1902–1953	Succeeded by Cayetana Fitz-James Stuart
Preceded by Carlos María Fitz-James Stuart	Duke of Montoro; 1902–1947	Succeeded by Cayetana Fitz-James Stuart
Preceded by Carlos María Fitz-James Stuart	Duke of Huéscar; 1902–1951	Succeeded by Carlos Fitz-James Stuart
Preceded by Empress Eugénie	Marquess of Ardales; 1920–1953	Succeeded by Jaime de Mitjans
Italian nobility
Preceded by Carlos María Fitz-James Stuart	Count of Modica; 1902–1953	Succeeded by Cayetana Fitz-James Stuart
Titles in pretence
Peerage of England
Preceded by Carlos María Fitz-James Stuart	Duke of Berwick, et cetera 1901–1953	Succeeded by Fernando Fitz-James Stuart y Saavedra
