= Duke of Montoro =

Hereditary title in the Peerage of Spain

Dukedom of Montoro
- Creation date: 12 April 1660
- Created by: Philip IV
- Peerage: Peerage of Spain
- First holder: Luis Méndez de Haro, 1st Duke of Montoro
- Present holder: Eugenia Martínez de Irujo y Fitz-James Stuart, 12th Duchess of Montoro
- Heir apparent: Cayetana Rivera y Martínez de Irujo

Duke of Montoro (Spanish: Duque de Montoro) is a hereditary title in the Peerage of Spain, accompanied by the dignity of Grandee and granted in 1660 by Philip IV to Luis Méndez de Haro, son of the 5th Marquess of Carpio.

The title makes reference to the municipality of Montoro, in the province of Córdoba.

== Dukes of Montoro (1660) ==
- Luis Méndez de Haro, 1st Duke of Montoro
- Gaspar Méndez de Haro, 2nd Duke of Montoro
- Catalina de Haro y Enríquez, 3rd Duchess of Montoro
- María Teresa Álvarez de Toledo y Haro, 4th Duchess of Montoro
- Fernando de Silva y Álvarez de Toledo, 5th Duke of Montoro
- María Cayetana de Silva y Silva-Bazán, 6th Duchess of Montoro
- Carlos Miguel Fitz-James Stuart y de Silva-Fernández de Híjar, 7th Duke of Montoro
- Jacobo Fitz-James Stuart y Ventimiglia, 8th Duke of Montoro
- Carlos María Fitz-James Stuart y Portocarrero, 9th Duke of Montoro
- Jacobo Fitz-James Stuart y Falcó, 10th Duke of Montoro
- Cayetana Fitz-James Stuart y Silva, 11th Duchess of Montoro
- Eugenia Martínez de Irujo y Fitz-James Stuart, 12th Duchess of Montoro

== See also ==
- List of dukes in the peerage of Spain
- List of current grandees of Spain
