= Jacobo Fitz-James Stuart, 3rd Duke of Berwick =

Spanish nobleman

The Most Excellent Admiral of the Ocean Sea Jacobo Fitz-James Stuart 3rd Duke of Berwick GE
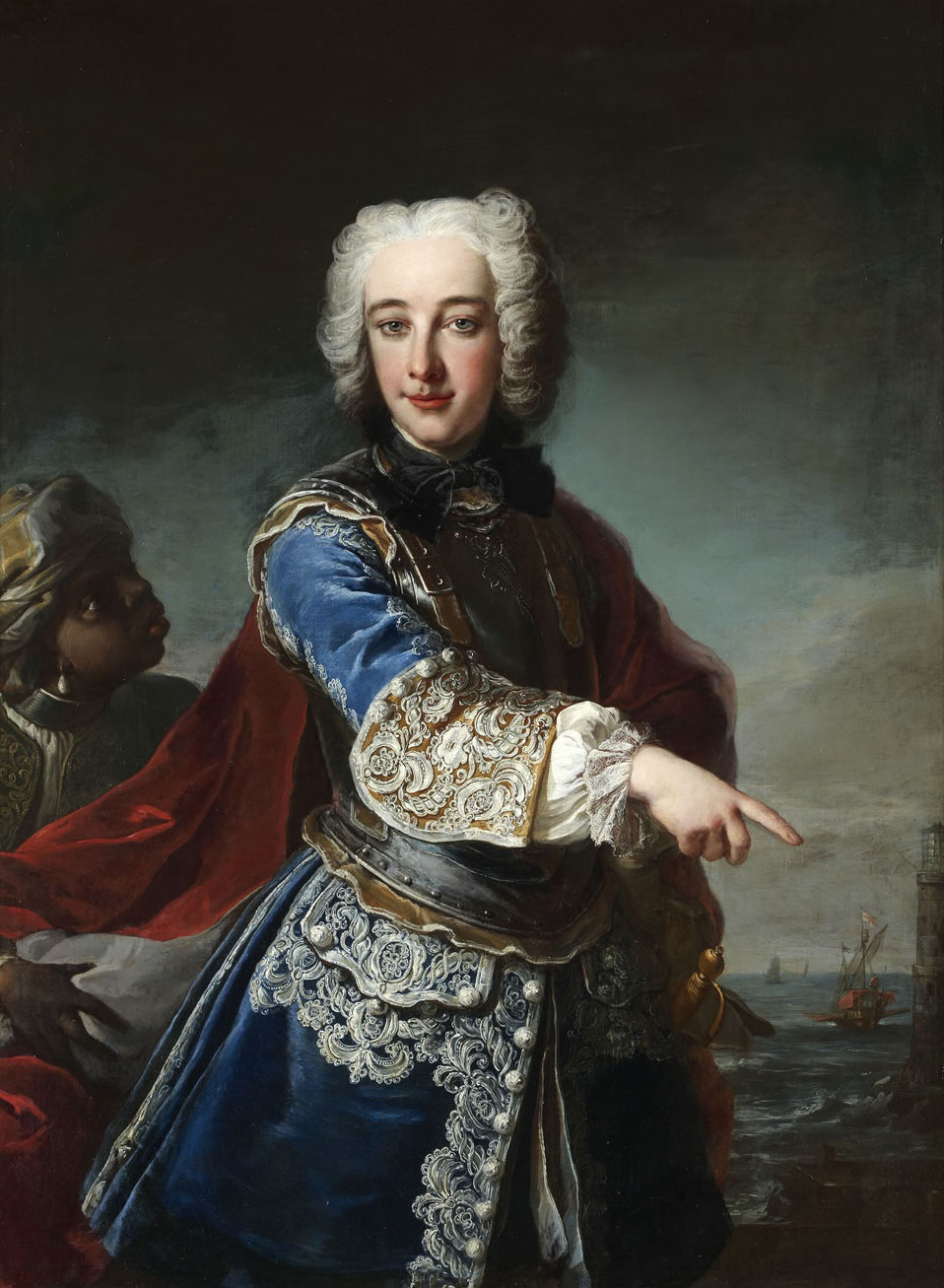
- Portrait by Louis-Michel van Loo

Personal details
- Born: Jacobo Francisco Eduardo Fitz-James Stuart y Colón de Portugal; 28 December 1718 Madrid, Spain
- Died: 30 September 1785 (aged 66) Valencia, Spain
- Spouse: María Teresa de Silva y Álvarez de Toledo
- Children: Carlos Fitz-James Stuart, 4th Duke of Liria and Jérica
- Parents: James Fitz-James Stuart, 2nd Duke of Berwick (father); Catalina Ventura de Colón de Portugal, 9th Duchess of Veragua and La Vega (mother)

Jacobo Francisco Eduardo Fitz-James Stuart y Colón de Portugal, 3rd Duke of Berwick (28 December 1718 – 30 September 1785) was a Spanish nobleman. On the death of his father, James Fitz-James Stuart, in 1738, he inherited his titles of Duke of Berwick and Duke of Liria and Jérica. He also possessed many other titles in both Spain and England. Through his father, he was descended from King James II of England. His mother was Spanish, and on her side he was a direct descendant of explorer Christopher Columbus. His best-known legacy is building the Liria Palace.

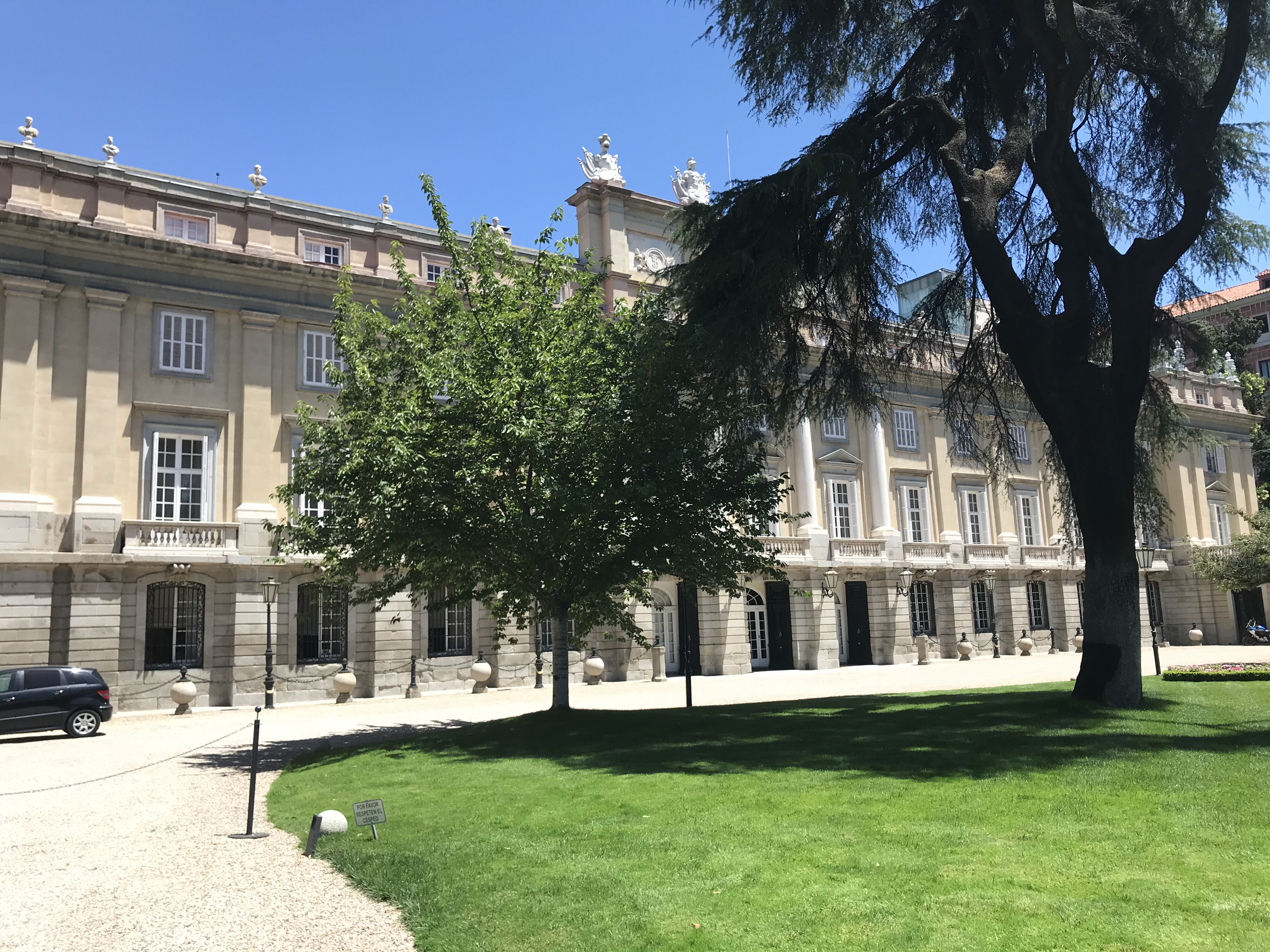
North façade of Liria Palace

== Marriages and issue ==
On 26 July 1738, in Alba de Tormes, he married Maria Teresa de Silva y Alvarez de Toledo (6 May 1716 – 5 May 1790), daughter of Manuel Maria de Silva y Mendoza, (born 18 October 1677), 9th Conde de Galve, son of Gregorio María de Silva y Mendoza, 9th Duke of the Infantado, and of the outstandingly wealthy Maria Teresa Alvarez de Toledo, (18 September 1691 – 1755), 11th Duchess of Alba de Tormes, 8th Duchess of Huéscar, 4th Duchess of Montoro, 6th Duchess of Olivares, 7th Duchess of Galisteo, Grandee of Spain, and a number of lesser Spanish noble titles. His wife was a sister of Fernando de Silva, 12th Duke of Alba, prime minister of Spain.

Their only child and son to survive to adulthood was Carlos Bernardo Fitz-James Stuart y de Silva, (Liria, Valencia, 25 March 1752 – Madrid, 7 September 1787).

== Titles ==
- 3rd Duke of Berwick
- 3rd Duke of Liria and Xérica, Grandee of Spain 1st Class
- 10th Duke of Veragua
- 10th Duke of la Vega
- 10th Marquess of Jamaica
- 3rd Earl of Tinmouth
- 9th Count of Gelves
- 3rd Baron Bosworth
- 12th Admiral and Adelantado of the Indies
