= Jacobo Fitz-James Stuart, 5th Duke of Liria and Jérica =

Spanish noble

Jacobo Fitz-James Stuart
- Duke of Liria and Jérica; Duke of Berwick
- Born: 25 February 1773; Paris, France
- Died: 3 April 1794 (aged 21); Madrid, Spain
- Noble family: FitzJames
- Spouse: María Teresa Fernández de Silva y de Palafox
- Issue: Jacobo Fitz-James Stuart, 6th Duke of Liria and Jérica; Carlos Miguel Fitz-James Stuart, 14th Duke of Alba
- Father: Carlos Fitz-James Stuart, 4th Duke of Liria and Jérica
- Mother: Caroline zu Stolberg-Gedern

Don Jacobo Felipe Carlos Fitz-James Stuart y Stolberg-Gedern, 5th Duke of Liria and Jérica, GE, (Paris, 25 February 1773 – Madrid, 3 April 1794) was a Spanish nobleman.

When his father died in 1787, he inherited all his titles and wealth, except those of the Colón family —the Dukedom of Veragua, the Dukedom of la Vega, the Marquessate of Jamaica, the Admiralty of the Ocean Sea and the Adelantado of the Indies—, that were claimed by a distant cousin. After a legal battle, he lost by court order those titles in favour of Mariano Colón de Larreátegui, who became the legal holder.

On 24 January 1790 he married María Teresa Fernández de Silva y Palafox, (10 March 1772 – Florence, Italy, 29 April 1818, aged 46), daughter of Pedro Fernández de Silva, 10th Duke of Híjar, and Rafaela de Palafox and sister of José Rafael de Silva Fernández de Híjar. The couple had two children: Jacobo José Fitz-James Stuart y Silva, born on 3 January 1792, who died at age three on 5 January 1795; and Carlos Miguel Fitz-James Stuart y Silva, born on 19 May 1794, a month after the death of his father.

Their two sons became successively the 6th Duke and 7th Duke of Liria and Jérica.
