= House of Alba =

Spanish noble family

House of Alba de Tormes
- Parent house: Álvarez de Toledo (until 1755); Silva (1755–1802); Fitz-James Stuart (1802–2014); Martínez de Irujo (2014–present)
- Country: Spain
- Founded: 15th century
- Founder: Gutierre Álvarez de Toledo
- Current head: Carlos Fitz-James Stuart y Martínez de Irujo, 19th Duke of Alba
- Titles: Duke of Alba de Tormes; Duke of Huéscar; Other titles

The House of Alba de Tormes (Spanish: Casa de Alba de Tormes), commonly known as the House of Alba, is a prominent Spanish noble family that descended from 12th-century nobility of post-conquest Toledo. The family's claim to Alba de Tormes dates from 1429, when Gutierre Álvarez de Toledo (of the House of Álvarez de Toledo) became Lord of Alba de Tormes while serving as Bishop of Palencia.

== History ==
In 1472, García Álvarez de Toledo, 2nd Count of Alba de Tormes, was elevated to the title of Duke of Alba de Tormes by King Henry IV of Castile. In 1492, the 2nd Duke of Alba de Tormes signed the capitulation of the city of Granada.

During the 16th century, Fernando Álvarez de Toledo, 3rd Duke of Alba, was given the title of governor general of the Spanish Netherlands. The third duke's first cousin was Eleanor of Toledo, who married Cosimo I de' Medici, Grand Duke of Tuscany. Through her granddaughter Marie de' Medici, Queen of France, she became the ancestor of many crowned heads and heirs apparent of Europe.

In 1802, María Cayetana de Silva, 13th Duchess of Alba, died without any issue and her titles were inherited by a relative, Carlos Miguel Fitz-James Stuart, 14th Duke of Alba. Thus, the dukedom of Alba passed to the senior branch of the House of Fitz-James Stuart, which took over the patrimony of the House of Alba.

From 1953 until 2014, the head of the House of Alba was Cayetana Fitz-James Stuart, 18th Duchess of Alba. She held the Guinness Book of Records title for the largest number of noble titles, with 57 titles.

The current head of the House of Alba is Carlos Fitz-James Stuart y Martínez de Irujo, 19th Duke of Alba, who succeeded his mother after her death in 2014. His father was Luis Martínez de Irujo, a younger son of the 9th Duke of Sotomayor. The family owns a significant collection of art, furniture and historic documents, mainly at the Liria Palace in Madrid.

== See also ==
- Duke of Berwick
- House of FitzJames
