= Liria Palace =

Coordinates: 40.4277°N 3.7124°W

- Palacio de Liria (Spanish)
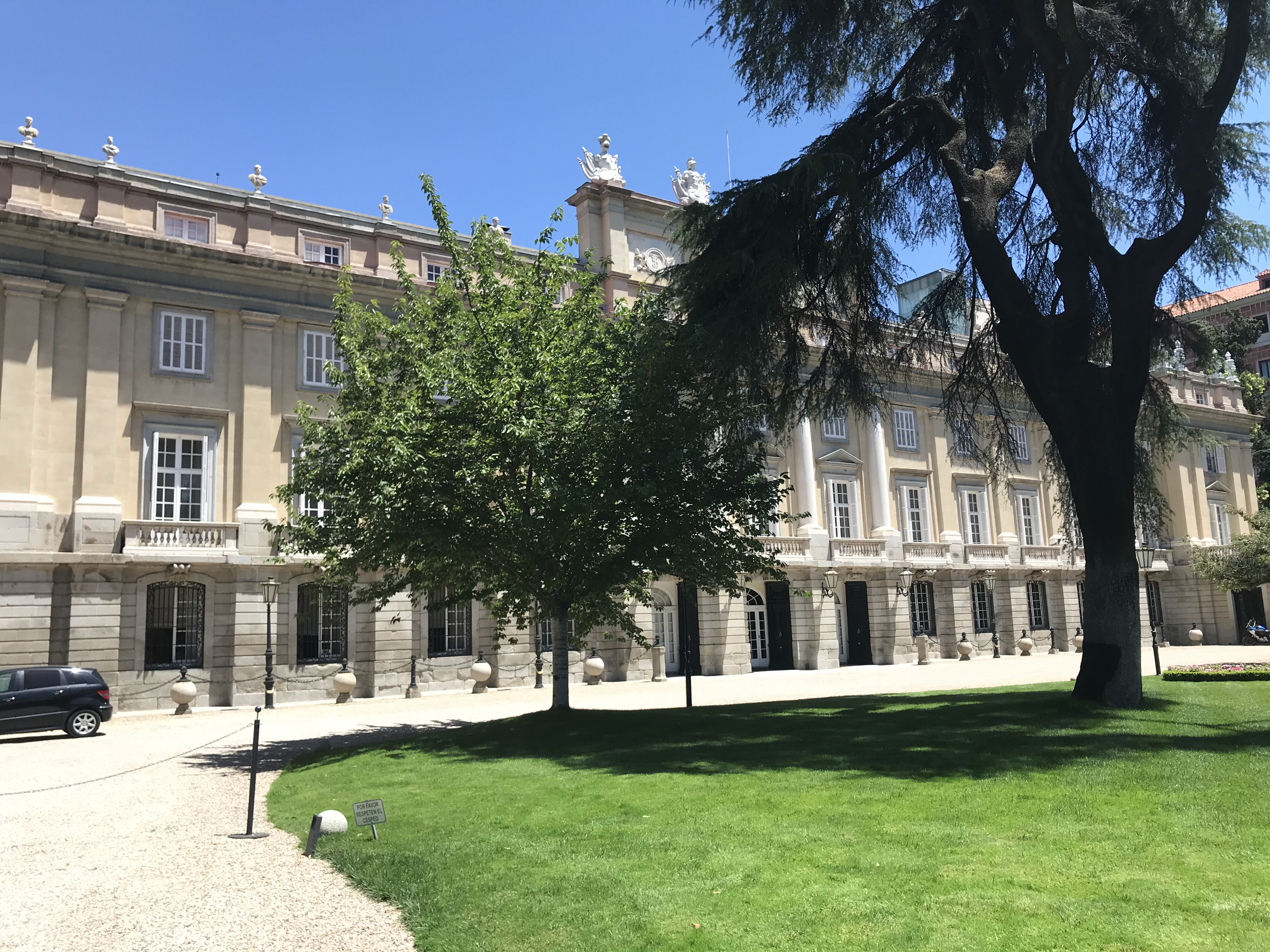
- North façade of Liria Palace
- Interactive map of the Liria Palace area

General information
- Architectural style: Neoclassical
- Location: Madrid, Spain

Design and construction
- Architects: Ventura Rodriguez; Edwin Lutyens

Spanish Cultural Heritage
- Official name: Palacio de Liria
- Criteria: Monument

The Liria Palace (Spanish: Palacio de Liria) is a neoclassical palace in Madrid, Spain. It is the Madrid residence of the Dukes of Alba.

== History ==
Built around 1770 to a design by the architect Ventura Rodríguez, it was commissioned by James Fitz-James Stuart, 3rd Duke of Berwick, who was also the 3rd Duke of Liria (hence the name of the palace). In the early 19th century it passed to the inheritance of the House of Alba. On 19 March 1833, a fire broke out at Liria Palace, destroying part of its archive. Eugénie de Montijo, last empress consort of the French, died here in 1920.

All but the facades were destroyed during the Spanish Civil War. It was subsequently rebuilt by Jacobo Fitz-James Stuart, 17th Duke of Alba and his daughter Cayetana Fitz-James Stuart, 18th Duchess of Alba who was head of the House of Alba from 1955 to 2014. The British architect Edwin Lutyens had been commissioned by the 17th Duke to provide designs for the interior. Lutyens was in contact with the Duke in the 1940s and the reconstruction, although it took place after the architect's death, made use of his drawings.

Although the 18th Duchess of Alba's official residence was the Liria Palace, in later life she preferred the Palacio de las Dueñas in Seville, where she died. Her son and heir Carlos Fitz-James Stuart, 19th Duke of Alba resides at the Liria Palace. On September 19, 2019, the family decided to open the doors of the palace to the public and allow guided tours. It is one of the few inhabited palaces that can be visited, since Carlos, the current duke, and his brother Fernando reside there.

== The gardens ==
The gardens were designed by prestigious landscapers and architects of the time, such as Ventura Rodríguez himself, Sabatini and the French architect and landscaper Jean Claude Nicolas Forestier. The gardens, originally in the formal French style, were remodeled in the romantic English style. The front, initially conceived as an esplanade, was planted with chestnut trees, mimosas, yews and pomegranate trees. The back of the palace is reserved for the original more geometric garden in the style of Versailles, with flower beds outlined by hedges. It underwent various changes in the 18th and 19th centuries.

In 1916, the 17th Duke of Alba commissioned Forestiere to recover the 18th-century style of the back part of the garden, which can only be seen from the balconies facing north. At the back there is a pet cemetery and the area is dominated by a pond with an 18th-century sculptural group with statues of fantastic animals.

From 2024 the gardens can be visited during the summer months.

== Art collection ==
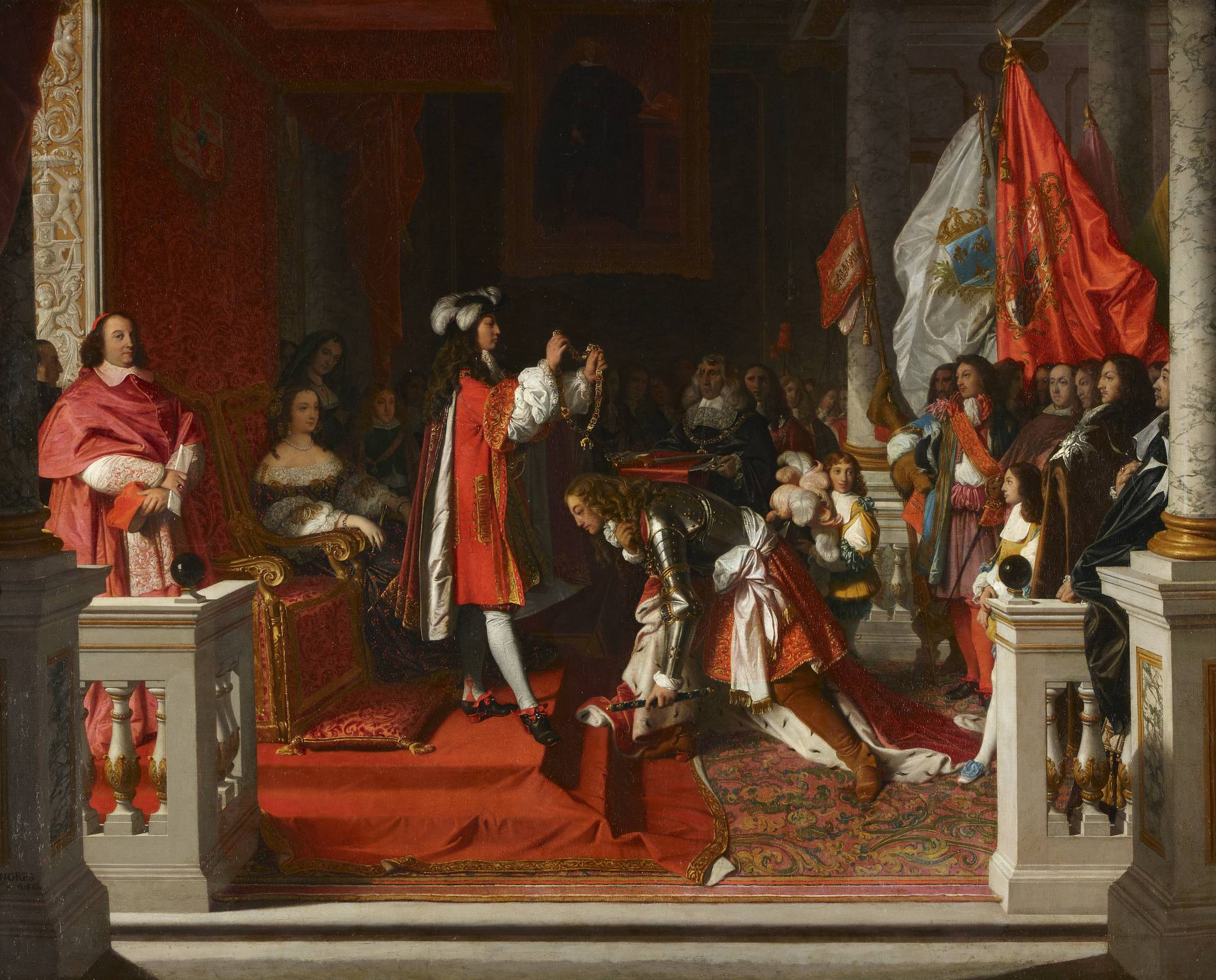
Philip V of Spain Investing Marshal Berwick with the Golden Fleece by Jean-Auguste-Dominique Ingres, 1818

The building is protected under Spanish heritage law as a listed monument, and some of the moveable art works it contains are also protected as Properties of Cultural Interest.

The palace contains a remarkable private collection of European art. The collection includes:

- Paintings by Pietro Perugino, Titian, Palma il Vecchio, El Greco, Anthonis Mor, Goya, Murillo, Zurbarán, Rembrandt, Jacob van Ruisdael, Ribera, Rubens, Francesco Guardi, Ingres, Joshua Reynolds, Courbet, Henri Fantin-Latour, Eugène Boudin and Joaquin Sorolla. One important work by Fra Angelico (Virgin of the pomegranate) was sold to the Prado Museum in 2016.
- Engravings by Dürer, Mantegna, Lucas van Leyden and Van Dyck.
- Sculptures: marble and bronze figures from the Roman Empire to the neoclassical period, including one portrait of Gioacchino Rossini by Lorenzo Bartolini.
- Archeological finds and decorative arts: Greek painted ceramics, old armor and weapons, 18th-century tapestries from the Gobelins Manufactory, Sèvres porcelains and empire style furniture.

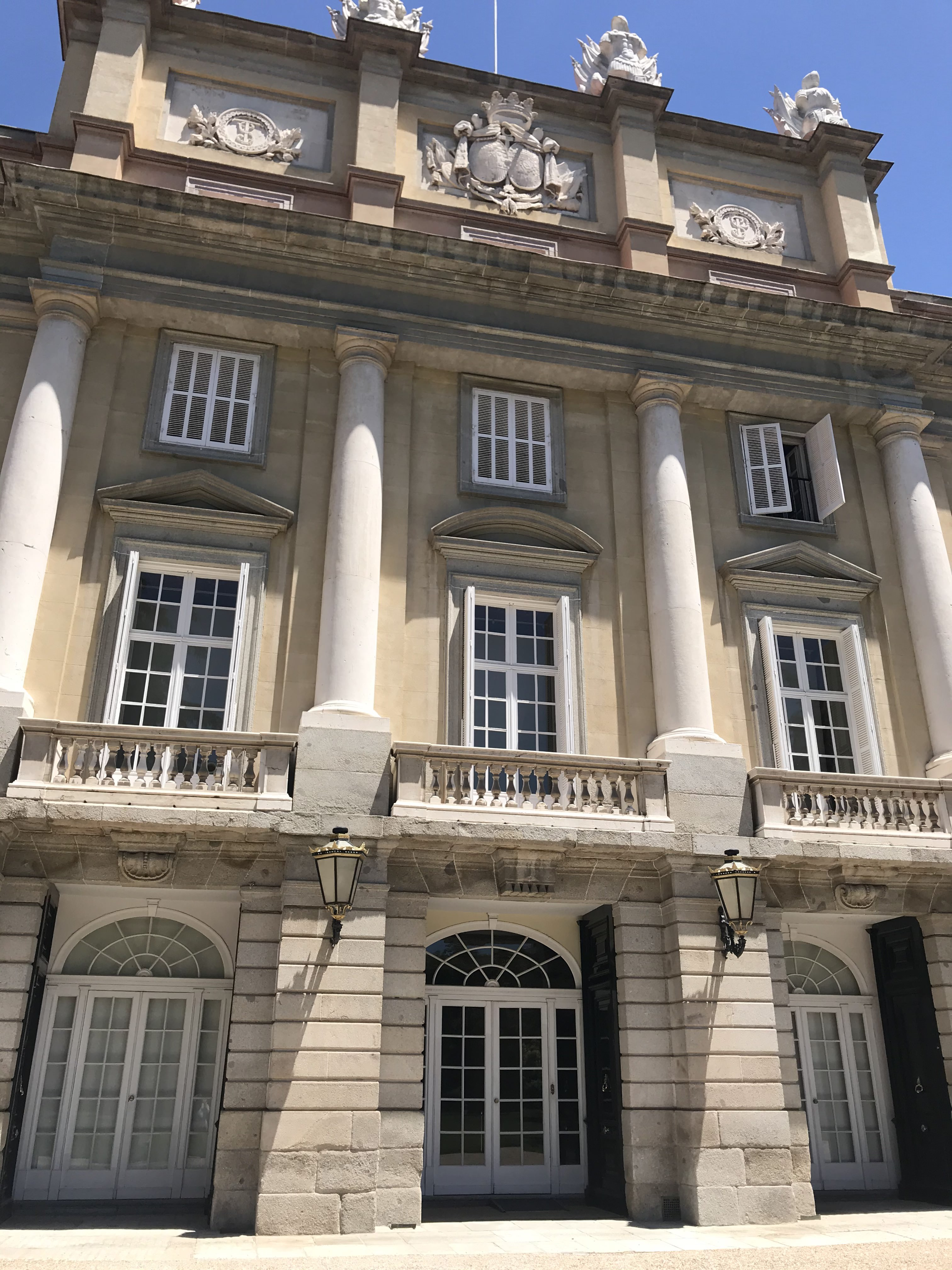
Detail of the main entrance

=== Works on loan ===
Some works were put on exhibition at the Cibeles Palace in Madrid in 2012. From September 2015 to January 2016 there was an exhibition of works belonging to the House of Alba, including items from the Liria Palace, in the Meadows Museum, Dallas. Another exhibition, titled Treasures from the House of Alba: 500 Years of Art and Collecting and containing over 130 items, was held at the Frist Center for the Visual Arts in Nashville, TN from February 5 to May 1, 2016.

== Archive ==
The library of the Palace contains an extensive archive with royal, nobiliary and colonial documents. Around 4,000 of these documents were lost during the fires that affected the Palace in 1833 and in 1936. Among the documents housed at the Palace are more than 9,000 books (including one first-edition copy of Don Quixote) and manuscripts (including the Alba Bible, Papal bulls from the Vatican, the last will of King Philip II of Spain and letters by Christopher Columbus, Titian and Rousseau).
