= Carlos Fitz-James Stuart, 4th Duke of Liria and Jérica =

Spanish duke

The Most Excellent Carlos Fitz-James Stuart 4th Duke of Liria and Jérica GE
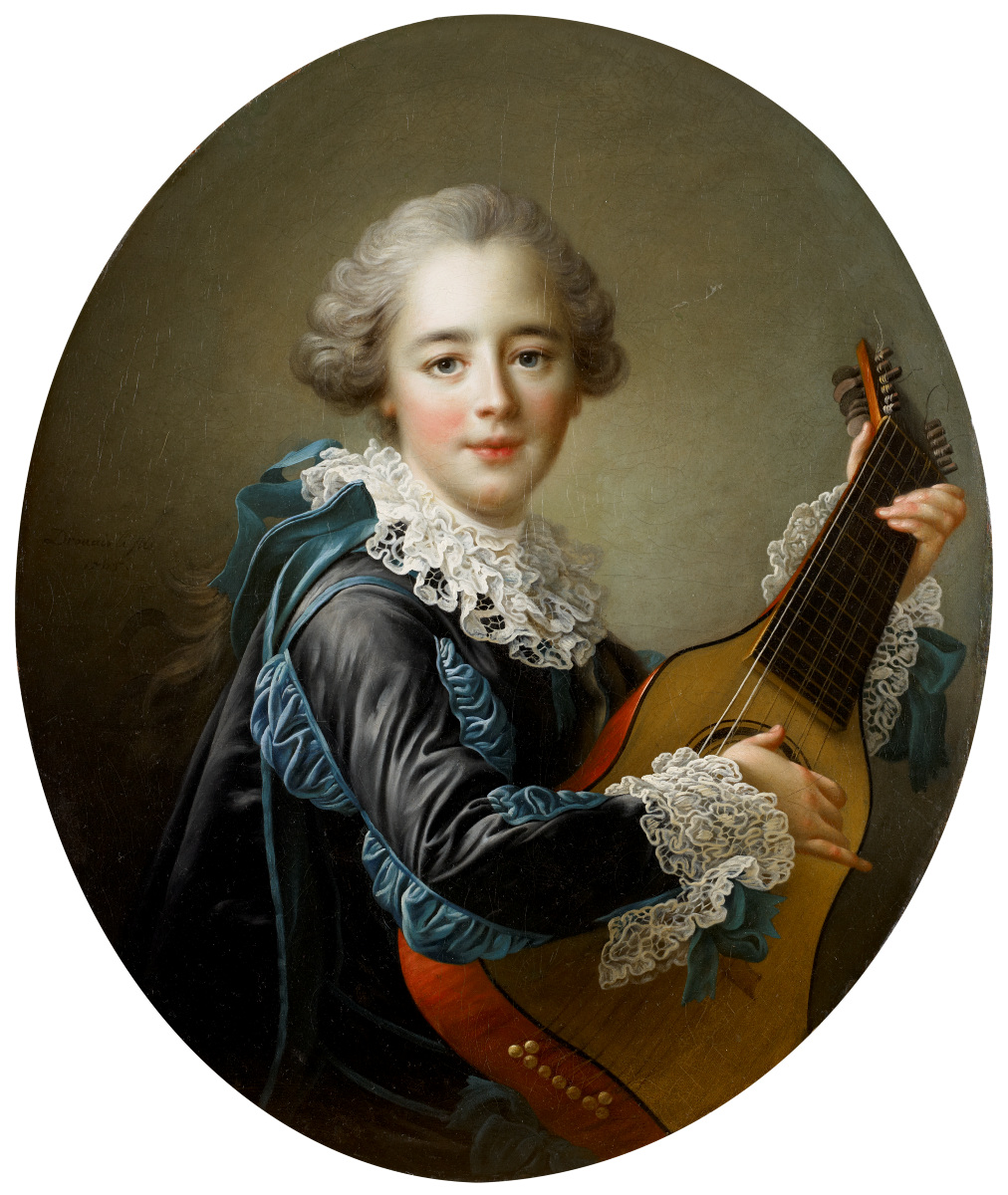
- Portrait by Drouais, 1765

Duke of Liria and Jérica; Duke of Berwick

Personal details
- Born: 25 March 1752 Liria, Spain
- Died: 7 September 1787 (aged 35) Madrid, Spain
- Spouse: Caroline zu Stolberg-Gedern
- Children: Jacobo Fitz-James Stuart, 5th Duke of Liria and Jérica; Maria FitzJames-Stuart y Stolberg-Gedern
- Parents: James Fitz-James Stuart, 3rd Duke of Berwick (father); Maria Teresa de Silva y Alvarez de Toledo (mother)

Carlos Bernardo Fitz-James Stuart y Silva, 4th Duke of Liria and Jérica (25 March 1752 – 7 September 1787) was a Spanish nobleman. Born in Liria, Spain, he was the son of James (Jacobo) Fitz-James Stuart, 3rd Duke of Berwick, and his wife, María Teresa de Silva y Álvarez de Toledo (a sister of Fernando, 12th Duke of Alba).

On 9 October 1771 he married Princess Caroline of Stolberg-Gedern (10 February 1755 – 15 April 1828), member of the House of Stolberg, sister of the Jacobite consort Louise of Stolberg-Gedern and sister-in-law to Charles Edward Stuart, called by Jacobites King Charles III. The couple had two children, a son Jacobo Felipe (Paris, 25 February 1773 - Madrid, 3 April 1794), and a daughter, María Francisca Fernanda (22 March 1775 - 22 September 1852).

Carlos Fitz-James Stuart inherited his father's titles in 1785. The Duke served as a Gentleman of the Bedchamber to King Charles III of Spain.

The Duke of Liria and Jérica died in 1787 in Madrid, and was succeeded by his son and eldest child Jacobo as the 5th Duke of Liria and Jérica and 5th Duke of Berwick.

== Titles ==
=== Spanish ===
- 11th Duke of Veragua, Grandee of Spain
- 11th Duke of la Vega, Grandee of Spain
- 4th Duke of Liria and Jérica, Grandee of Spain
- 14th Marquess of la Mota
- 12th Marquess of Sarria
- 11th Marquess of Jamaica
- 6th Marquess of Tarazona
- 5th Marquess of San Leonardo
- 14th Count of Monforte de Lemos, Grandee of Spain
- 12th Count of Monterrey, Grandee of Spain
- 15th Count of Lemos
- 11th Count of Gelves
- 8th Count of Ayala

=== Jacobite ===
- 4th Duke of Berwick
- 4th Earl of Tinmouth
- 4th Baron Bosworth
