= Monastery of Inmaculada Concepción (Loeches) =

Monastery of Nuns of Order of Preachers in Loeches, Spain

- Monasterio de la Inmaculada Concepción (Spanish)
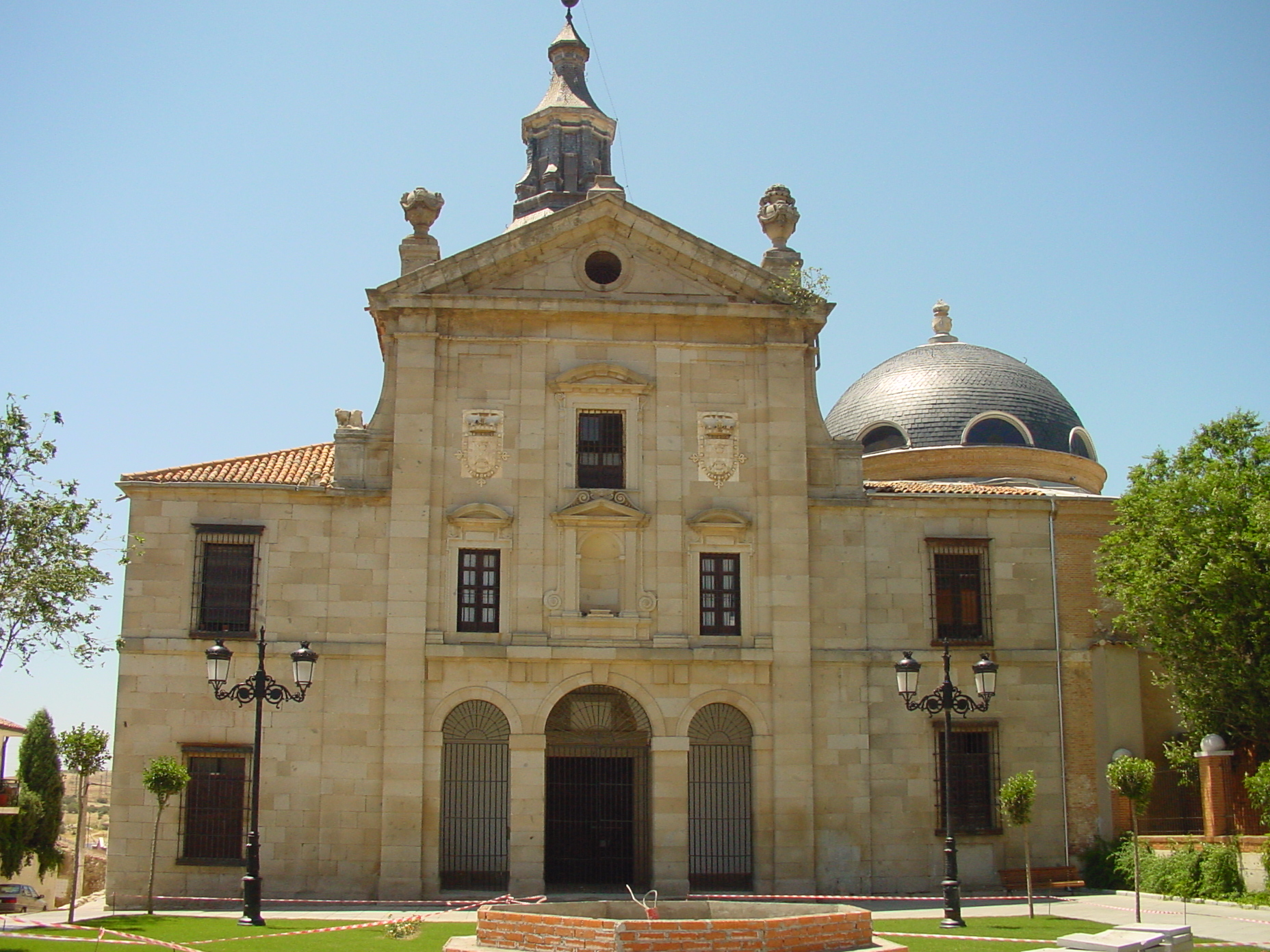

- Location within Spain
- 40.386036°N 3.411755°W
- Location: Loeches, Spain

Site notes
- Website: https://monasterioloeches.org/

Spanish Cultural Heritage
- Official name: Monasterio de la Inmaculada Concepción
- Type: Non-movable
- Criteria: Monument
- Designated: 1982
- Reference no.: RI-51-0004585

The Monastery of the Immaculate Conception (Spanish: Monasterio de la Inmaculada Concepción) is a monastery of Dominican nuns located in the Spanish town of Loeches, in front of the Town square of the Duchess of Alba. It is also known as "The Big Convent (El Convento Grande)".

It was declared Bien de Interés Cultural in 1982.

== History ==
It was founded in 1640 by Gaspar de Guzmán y Pimentel, III count-duke of Olivares, Favourite of King Philip IV . The work was completed by his nephew, Luis Méndez de Haro, Marqués del Carpio and iv Count-Duke of Olivares and, later, It would become one of the richest churches in pictorial works in Spain, with objects given to the Count-Duke of Olivares by King Philip IV. Relatives of the Dominican Mothers also donated many other works. The art collection had works by Alonso Cano, Rubens, Bassano, Tintoretto, Veronese and Michelangelo, among others.

In 1809 the collection was looted by General Horace Sebastiani de la Porta during the French invasion and many of these works were taken to France, where today they can be seen in museums such as the Louvre. Other paintings are now located in other museums such as the National Gallery of London or the John and Mable Ringling Museum of Art in Florida.

Currently, the monastery is under the patronage of the House of Alba, current counts-dukes of Olivares.

== Family pantheon of the House of Alba ==
In 1909 Jacobo Fitz-James Stuart y Falcó, 17th Duke of Alba de Tormes and 13th Count-Duke of Olivares, founded a pantheon adding a chapel to the monastery for the House of Alba, which was the work of Juan Bautista Lázaro inspired by the chapel from El Escorial.

In the mausoleum rest – mainly – the remains of the heads of the House of Alba, from Jacobo Fitz-James Stuart y Ventimiglia, xv Duke of Alba de Tormes.

The mausoleum of María Francisca de Sales Portocarrero, sister of Eugenia de Montijo and empress of France, the work of Charles-Alphonse- Achille Gumery.

=== Commemorated in the Pantheon ===
Name	Year of Death
María Francisca Palafox Portocarrero y KirkPatrick, xii Duchess of Peñaranda de Duero.	1860
Jacobo Fitz-James Stuart y Ventimiglia, xv Duke of Alba de Tormes.	1881
Carlos María Fitz-James Stuart y Palafox, xvi Duke of Alba de Tormes.	1901
María del Rosario Falcó y Osorio, xxi Countess of Siruela.	1904
María del Rosario de Silva y Gurtubay, x Marchise of San Vicente del Barco.	1934
María del Rosario Gurtubay y González de Castejón, xvi Duke consort of Híjar.	1948
Jacobo Fitz-James Stuart y Falcó, xvii Duke of Alba de Tormes.	1953
Eugenia Sol María del Pilar Fitz-James Stuart y Falcó, xiv Countess de Baños.	1962
Hernando Fitz-James Stuart y Falcó, xvii Duke of Peñaranda de Duero.	1970
Luis Martínez de Irujo y Artázcoz, xviii Duchess consort of Alba de Tormes.	1972
Jesús Aguirre, xviii Duchess consort of Alba de Tormes.	2001
Cayetana Fitz-James Stuart, xviii Duchess of Alba de Tormes (half of her ashes).	2014
