= Marquis of Villanueva del Fresno =

Spanish nobility title

Marquisate of Villanueva del Fresno
- Creation date: 1530
- Created by: Carlos I of Spain
- Peerage: Spanish nobility
- First holder: Juan Portocarrero, 7th Lord of Villanueva del Fresno
- Present holder: Carlos Fitz-James Stuart, 19th Duke of Alba
- Heir apparent: Fernando Fitz-James Stuart, 17th Duke of Huéscar
- Remainder to: Heirs of the body of the grantee

The Marquis of Villanueva del Fresno (Spanish: Marqués de Villanueva del Fresno) is a hereditary title in the Spanish nobility. This marquisate was bestowed by Carlos I to Juan Portocarrero, 7th Lord of Villanueva del Fresno, for services rendered to the Crown.

The Seigniory of Villanueva del Fresno (Spanish: Señorío de Villanueva del Fresno) traces its origins to the year 1332, when Alfonso XI conceded to Martín Fernández Portocarrero the village of Villanueva del Fresno, and granted him the title 1st Lord of Villanueva del Fresno and 2nd Lord of Moguer.

== List of marquesses ==
Marquises of Villanueva del Fresno Created by Charles I of Spain
	Titleholder	Period
I	Juan Portocarrero	1530-1544
II	Pedro Portocarrero	1544-1557
III	Alonso Portocarrero	1557-1560
IV	Juan Portocarrero	1560-?
V	Alonso Portocarrero	¿-1622
VI	Francisca Luisa Portocarrero	1622-1639
VII	Juan Gaspar Domingo Portocarrero de Moscoso	1639-1640
VIII	Francisco Portocarrero	1640-?
IX	Alonso Portocarrero	unknown
X	Pedro Fernández Portocarrero	¿-1703
XI	Diego Antonio-López Barradas	1718-1727
XII	Antonio-López Barradas Portocarrero	1727-1729
XIII	Cristóbal Gregorio Portocarrero	1729-1763
XIV	Cristóbal Pedro Portocarrero	?-1757
XV	María Francisca de Sales Portocarrero y Zúñiga; Felipe López Pacheco y de la Cueva	1763-1808; 1765-1798
XVI	Eugenio Portocarrero y Palafox; Diego Fernández de Velasco	1808-1834; 1798-1811
XVII	Cipriano de Palafox y Portocarrero	1834-1839
XVIII	María Francisca de Sales Portocarrero y Kirkpatrick	1839-1860
XIX	Carlos María Fitz-James Stuart y Portocarrero	1881-1901
XX	Jacobo Fitz-James Stuart y Falcó	1901-1955
XXI	María del Rosario Cayetana Fitz-James Stuart y Silva	1955-2014
XXII	Carlos Fitz-James Stuart y Martínez de Irujo	2014-present
