= Marquess of Ardales =

Marquessate of Ardales
- Creation date: 31 July 1559
- Created by: Philip II
- Peerage: Peerage of Spain
- First holder: Luis de Guzmán y Córdoba, 1st Marquess of Ardales
- Present holder: María de los Reyes Mitjans y Verea, 20th Marchioness of Ardales

Marquess of Ardales (Spanish: Marqués de Ardales) is an hereditary title in the Peerage of Spain, granted in 1559 by Philip II to Luis de Guzmán, 2nd Count of Teba and Marshall of Castile. The name refers to the town of Ardales in Málaga.

Eugenia, 16th Marchioness of Ardales (in her own right), became Empress of the French for her marriage to Napoleon III.

== Marquesses of Ardales (1559) ==
- Luis de Guzmán y Córdoba, 1st Marquess of Ardales
- Juan Ramírez de Guzmán y Álvarez de Toledo, 2nd Marquess of Ardales
- Brianda de Guzmán y de la Vega, 3rd Marchioness of Ardales
- Luis de Guzmán y Guzmán, 4th Marquess of Ardales
- Pedro Andrés de Guzmán Enríquez de Rivera y Acuña, 5th Marquess of Ardales
- Luis Francisco Ramírez de Guzmán y Fernández de Córdoba, 6th Marquess of Ardales
- Pedro de Guzmán y Portocarrero, 7th Marquess of Ardales
- Agustín de Guzmán y Portocarrero, 8th Marquess of Ardales
- Cristóbal Portocarrero de Guzmán Henriquez de Luna, 9th Marquess of Ardales
- Catalina Portocarrero de Guzmán, 10th Marchioness of Ardales
- Domingo Fernández de Córdoba, 11th Marquess of Ardales
- María del Carmen Fernández de Córdoba, 12th Marchioness of Ardales
- Luis Fernández de Córdoba y Portocarrero, 13th Marquess of Ardales, Archbishop of Toledo
- Eugenio Palafox Portocarrero, 14th Marquess of Ardales
- Cipriano de Palafox y Portocarrero, 15th Marquess of Ardales
- María Eugenia de Palafox y Kirkpatrick, 16th Marchioness of Ardales
- Jacobo Fitz-James Stuart y Falcó, 17th Marquess of Ardales
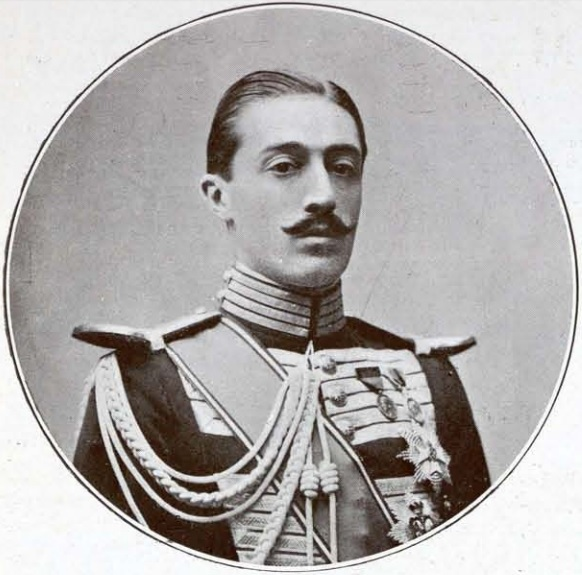
  The 17th Marquess photographed by Franzen
- Jaime de Mitjans y Fitz-James Stuart, 18th Marquess of Ardales
- Carlos Alfonso de Mitjans y Fitz-James Stuart, 19th Marquess of Ardales
- María de los Reyes de Mitjans y Verea, 20th Marchioness of Ardales

== See also ==
- House of Guzmán
