= Count of Baños =

Countship of Baños
- Creation date: 22 December 1621
- Created by: Philip IV
- Peerage: Peerage of Spain
- First holder: Sancho Martínez de Leyva y Suárez de Mendoza, 1st Count of Baños
- Present holder: Jaime Patiño y Mitjans, 17th Count of Baños

Count of Baños (Spanish: Conde de Baños) is a hereditary title in the Peerage of Spain accompanied by the dignity of Grandee, granted in 1621 by Philip IV to Sancho Martínez de Leyva, iure uxoris Marquess of Leyva and knight of the Order of Santiago.

== Counts of Baños (1621) ==
- Sancho Martínez de Leyva y Suárez de Mendoza, 1st Count of Baños
- Mariana Isabel de Leyva y Mendoza, 2nd Countess of Baños
- Pedro de la Cerda y Leyva, 3rd Count of Baños
- Teresa María de la Cerda y Lancastre, 4th Countess of Baños
- María Ana Josefa de la Cerda y Rocaberti, 5th Countess of Baños
- Francisco Coloma y de la Cerda, 6th Count of Baños
- Domingo Fernández de Córdoba y Portocarrero, 7th Count of Baños
- María Francisca de Sales Portocarrero y Zúñiga, 8th Countess of Baños
- Eugenio Palafox y Portocarrero, 9th Count of Baños
- Cipriano de Palafox y Portocarrero, 10th Count of Baños
- María Francisca de Sales Portocarrero y Kirkpatrick, 11th Countess of Baños
- Carlos María Fitz-James Stuart Portocarrero, 12th Count of Baños
- Jacobo Fitz-James Stuart y Falcó, 13th Count of Baños
- Eugenia Sol María del Pilar Fitz-James Stuart y Falcó, 14th Countess of Baños
- Carlos Alfonso de Mitjans y Fitz-James Stuart, 15th Count of Baños
- Macarena de Mitjans y Verea, 16th Countess of Baños
- Jaime Patiño y Mitjans, 17th Count of Baños

== See also ==
- List of current grandees of Spain
