= María Francisca de Sales Portocarrero y Zúñiga =

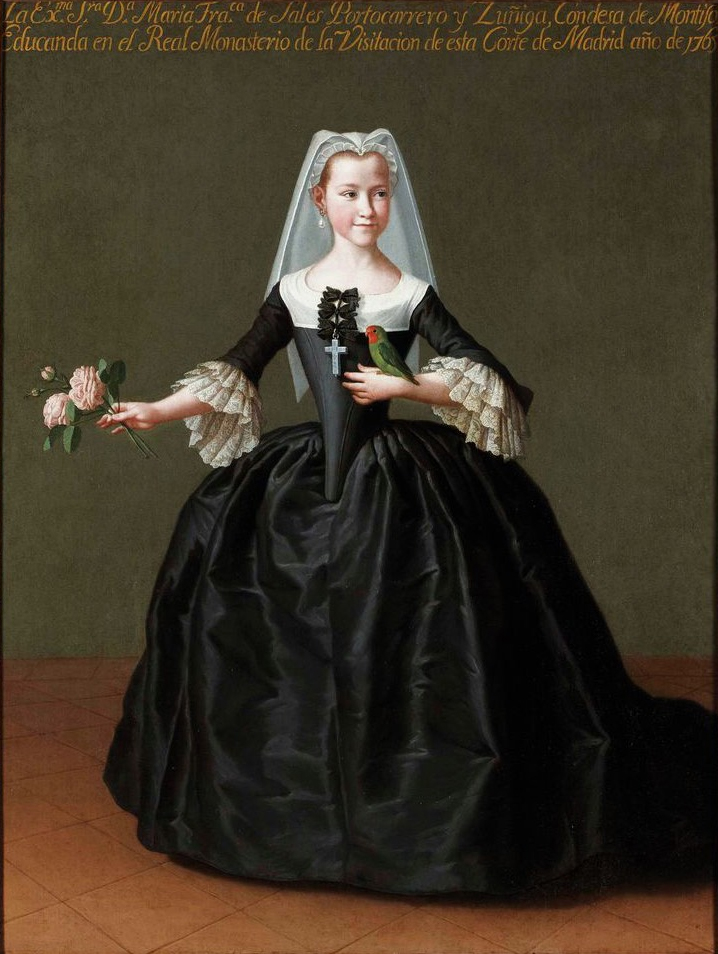
The Countess of Montijo as a young girl of 11 by Andrés de la Calleja.

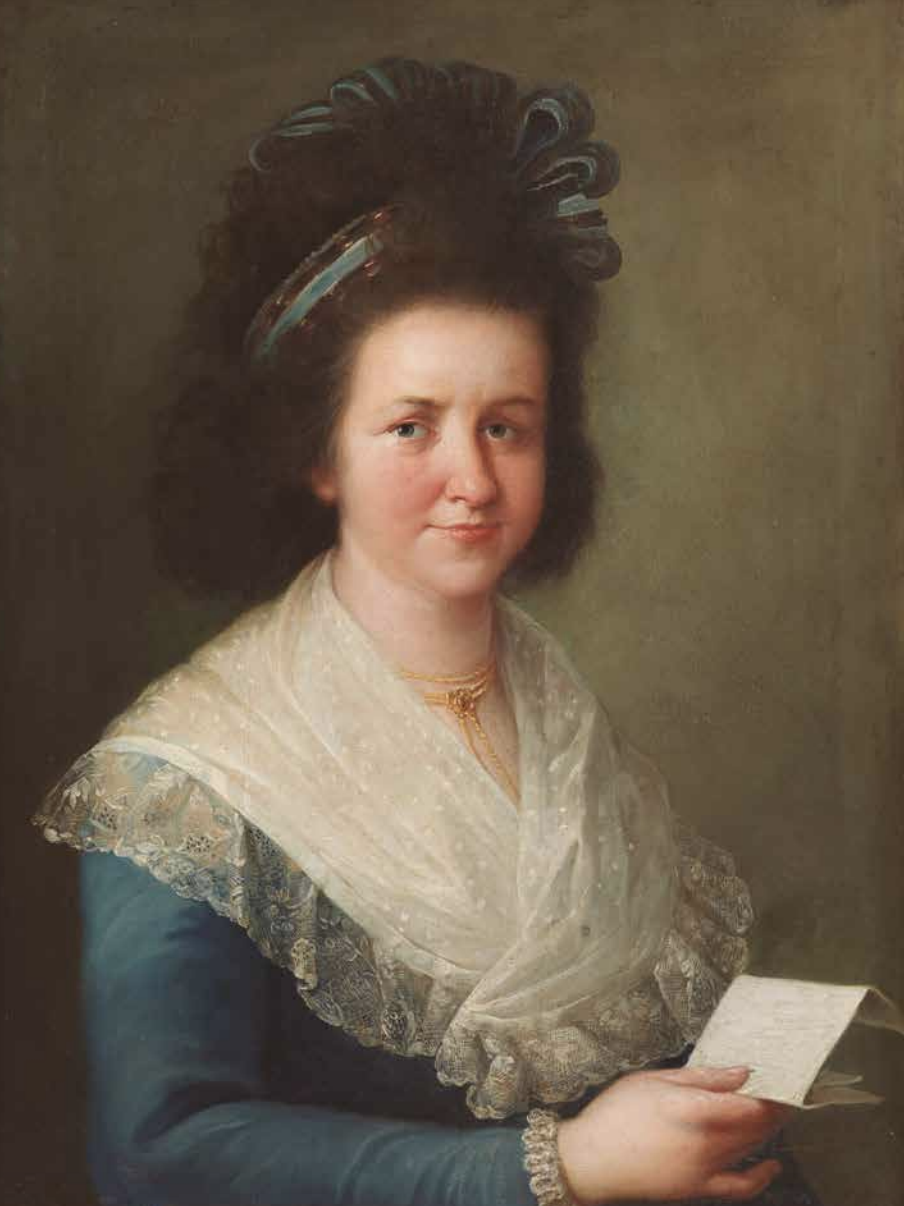
The Countess of Montijo around 1785.

María Francisca de Sales Portocarrero de Guzmán y Zúñiga (10 June 1754 – 15 April 1808), 6th Countess of Montijo, was a Spanish noblewoman, Grandee of Spain, and as salonière, a key figure of the Enlightenment in Spain.

== Biography ==
=== Youth and marriage ===
She was the daughter of Cristóbal Antonio Portocarrero, Marquess of Valderrábano, and María Josefa de Zúñiga, who was the daughter of the Counts of Miranda del Castañar. Having lost her father at the age of 3 and as the sole descendant of the illustrious House of Portocarrero, she inherited the title of Countess of Montijo at the age of 9 from her grandfather Cristóbal Gregorio Portocarrero, who had outlived her father. She held the titles of Countess twice over and Marchioness three times, was a Grandee of Spain of the First Class twice, and possessed several other titles, making her one of the wealthiest young women of her era.

Shortly after becoming a widow, her mother entered religious life in a convent in 1762. Consequently, during her childhood, María Francisca was placed under the care and guardianship of her grandfather, the 5th Count of Montijo, and a great-uncle, Luis II Fernandez de Cordoba, Cardinal-Archbishop of Toledo and Count of Teba.
In accordance with her father's will, her education was entrusted to the nuns of the Convent of the Salesas Reales in Madrid where she became proficient in the classical languages, as well as in French. At the age of 14, she left the convent of Las Salesas after receiving a marriage proposal from Felipe Palafox y Croy de Abré, a younger son of the Marquises of Ariza and they were married on 8 November 1768, when she was 14 and the groom was 29.

The couple had eight children, six of whom survived childhood : 2 sons and 4 daughters.
Her husband died in 1791, when she was 36 years old. In 1795, she entered into a second, secret marriage with Estanislao de Lugo (1753–1833), a man of lower social standing than her own, but with whom he shared a deep friendship and many affinities.

=== Adult life ===
When she was 19, she was contacted by the Bishop of Barcelona, Josep Climent i Avinent, who commissioned her to translate the work Sacrament du mariage by Nicolas Letourneux, a French 17th Century writer of Jansenistic tendencies, which she translated into Spanish as Ilustraciones cristianes sobre el sacramento del matrimonio. Clement recommended the work to the clergy of his diocese and printed it in Barcelona in 1774. Through the bishop, she also had contact with the abbot Clément de Bizón, the French Janseanist circle and the magazine Nouvelles Ecclésiastiques, the mouthpiece of this circle.

The Countess of Montijo participated in the creation of the Junta de Damas de Honor y Mérito (Board of Ladies of Honor and Merit) in 1787, of which she was elected secretary and held the position for 18 years. She served on the Commission for Moral Education, established in 1794, and directed the Patriotic School of San Andrés, which had 96 female students. She also helped establish an association for the female inmates of the Galera (a women's prison), which provided the prisoners with vocational training and sought to alleviate their dire living conditions. Furthermore, she undertook the reform of the Inclusa (a foundling hospital) in Madrid after being appointed as a trustee for foundlings. Within just one year, she succeeded in reducing the mortality rate from 80% to 46%.

For all her efforts, she received the Order of Queen Maria Luisa.
A woman of an active disposition, she managed the accounts for her household and estates, a task not without its share of legal disputes.

Furthermore, she possessed a great "knack for dealing with people" and an intellectual curiosity that led her to host one of the most influential Enlightenment-era "salons" of her time. This circle took a particular interest in religious issues and Regalist politics, that is, the assertion of royal authority over the Church. Among its regular attendees were figures such as Gaspar Melchor de Jovellanos, Juan Meléndez Valdés, Estanislao de Lugo, the enlightened bishop Antonio Tavira y Almazán, and Antonio Palafox y Croy, her brother-in-law and Bishop of Cuenca. The Montijo salon, located on Madrid's Calle del Duque de Alba, drew a wide array of guests: literary figures like the Iriarte brothers, Moratín, and Forner; politicians and military men such as Campomanes, Cabarrús, Urqijo, Mazarredo, O’Reilly, and Gravina; artists including Bayeu, Vicente López, and Francisco de Goya; historians like Vargas Ponce and Llaguno; and physicians and scientists such as Luzuriaga and Gutiérrez Bueno. The Countess acted as a patron to many of them.

Although she possessed an incisive pen and wrote with great ease, the Countess's primary interests did not lie in writing; rather, she focused her energies on altruistic and patriotic endeavors, all of which aligned with the reformist agenda of the Enlightenment.

=== Banishment and death ===
The Countess and her circle were watched for several years by the Inquisition and finally, Manuel Godoy, unhappy with the Countess's activities, issued a banishment order against her,which she complied with on 9 September 1805. She first settled in Extremadura, where she spent a few months with her second husband Estanislao de Lugo and some servants at the Montijo Palace. Later he went to Logroño, in the states belonging to the county of Baños. The Countess died in that city, on 15 April 1808, stricken by a fever that ravaged the city.

=== Children ===
The Countess of Montijo with her 4 daughters, by Agustín Esteve.

María Francisca de Sales Portocarrero y Zúñiga had 6 surviving children from her first marriage :

- Eugenio (1773–1834), 7th Count of Montijo, 17th Count of Teba, etc. No issue.
- María Ramona (1777–1823), married José Antonio de la Cerda Marín, 6th Count of Parcent.
- María Gabriela (1779–1823), married her cousin Luis Rebolledo de Palafox, 4th Marquis of Lazán.
- María Tomasa (1780–1835), Marquise of Villafranca, President of the Junta de Damas.
- María Benita (1782–1864), married Antonio Ciriaco Belvís de Moncada, 10th Marquess of Villamayor de las Ibernias
- Cipriano (1784–1839), 8th Count of Montijo, 18th Count of Teba, etc., married María Kirkpatrick de Grevignée and had issue.
