= Fresno (disambiguation) =

Fresno is the fifth-largest city in California.

Fresno (ash tree in the Spanish language) may also refer to:

== Places ==
Colombia

- Fresno, Tolima

Spain

- Villanueva del Fresno, Badajoz, Extremadura
- Fresno, a ghost village in Nidáliga, Valle de Sedano, Burgos
- Aldea del Fresno, Madrid
- Fresno de la Vega, Ribera del Esla, León
- Fresno el Viejo, Tierra del Vino, Valladolid

United States

- Fresno, alternate name of Pueblo de las Juntas, California
- Fresno County, California
  - Fresno, California
- Fresno, Ohio
- Fresno, Texas

== Entertainment ==
- Fresno (band), emo band from Porto Alegre, Rio Grande do Sul, Brazil
- Fresno (movie), a 2015 film by Jamie Babbit, starring Natasha Lyonne and Judy Greer.
- Fresno (TV miniseries), 1986 parody of night-time soap operas starring Carol Burnett and Dabney Coleman

== Food ==
- Fresno chile, a cultivar of Capsicum annuum

== Machines ==
- Fresno scraper, earth-moving machine

== Titles ==
- Marquess of Villanueva del Fresno, an ancient title of nobility in the Kingdom of Spain.

== War ships ==
- USS Fresno (CL-121), United States Navy cruiser
- USS Fresno (LST-1182), United States Navy amphibious assault landing ship tanker

== See also ==
- Fresnillo
