= María del Rosario de Silva, Duchess of Alba =

Spanish duchess

The Most Excellent María del Rosario de Silva
- Marchioness of San Vicente del Barco; Duchess consort of Alba
- Full name: María del Rosario de Silva y Gurtubay
- Born: 4 April 1900; Madrid, Spain
- Died: 11 January 1934 (aged 33); Madrid, Spain
- Buried: Monastery of Inmaculada Concepción (Loeches)
- Noble family: House of Híjar; House of Silva
- Spouse: Jacobo Fitz-James Stuart, 17th Duke of Alba (m. 1920)
- Issue: Cayetana Fitz-James Stuart, 18th Duchess of Alba
- Father: Alfonso de Silva, 16th Duke of Híjar
- Mother: María del Rosario Gurtubay y González de Castejón

Doña María del Rosario de Silva y Gurtubay, Duchess of Alba de Tormes, 9th Marchioness of San Vicente del Barco, GE (4 April 1900 – 11 January 1934) was a Spanish aristocrat and socialite.

== Early life ==
María was born in Madrid, Spain on 4 April 1900. She was the sole heiress of all the titles of her father, Alfonso de Silva, 16th Duke of Híjar, and of the fortune of her mother, María del Rosario Gurtubay, the young Marchioness was one of the beauties of her time.

== Personal life ==
She married in London, on 7 October 1920, to Jacobo Fitz-James Stuart, 17th Duke of Alba, thus becoming the Duchess of Alba. Before her death, they were the parents of a daughter:

- Cayetana Fitz-James Stuart (1926–2014), who married Luis Martínez de Irujo y Artázcoz in 1947. After his death in 1972, she married Jesús Aguirre y Ortiz de Zárate in 1978. After his death in 2001, she married Alfonso Díez Carabantes in 2011.

The Duke and Duchess travelled to the United States in 1924, visiting Chicago, New York, Washington, and Long Island.

She stayed with her family in the Liria Palace in Madrid and died there of tuberculosis on 11 January 1934, aged only 33.

== Ancestry ==
Ancestors of María del Rosario de Silva, Duchess of Alba

8. Andrés de Silva, 13th Duke of Aliaga
4. Alfonso de Silva, 15th Duke of Híjar
9. María Isabel Campbell
2. Alfonso de Silva, 16th Duke of Híjar
10. Luis Fernández de Córdoba, 15th Duke of Medinaceli
5. María del Dulce Nombre Fernández de Córdoba y Pérez de Barradas
11. Ángela Pérez de Barradas, 1st Duchess of Denia and Tarifa
1. María del Rosario de Silva, 9th Marchioness of San Vicente del Barco
12. José María Simón Gurtubay y Zubero
6. Juan Gurtubay y Meaza
13. Rosalía Meaza y Basterra
3. María del Rosario Gurtubay y González de Castejón
14. Luis González de Castejon y Gil-Delgado
7. Adelaida González de Castejón y Torre
15. Adelaida Torre de Lequerica y Uríbarri
