= Eugénie de Montijo =

Empress of the French from 1853 to 1870

- 19th Countess of Teba; 16th Marchioness of Ardales
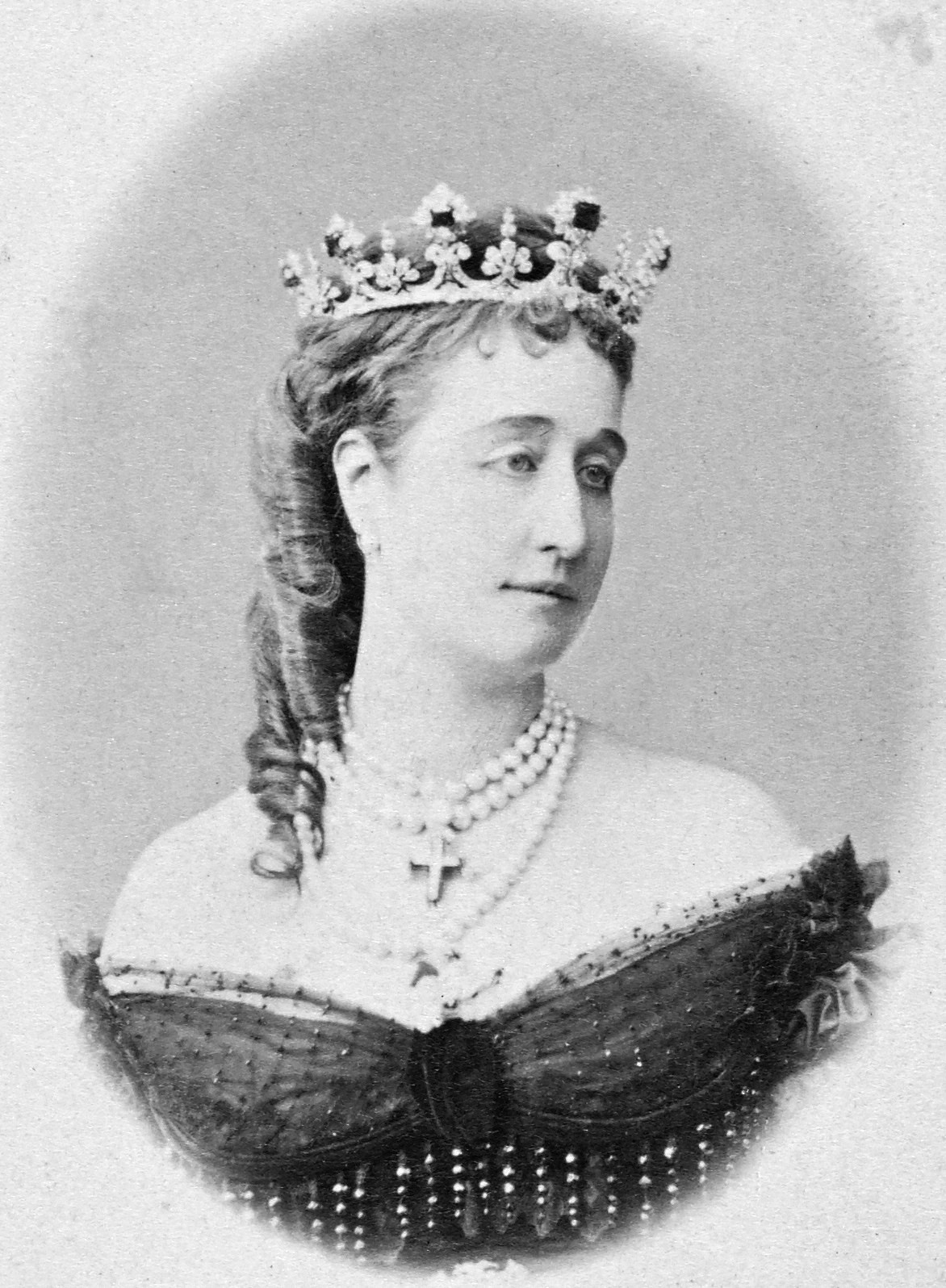
- c. 1862

Empress consort of the French
- Tenure: 30 January 1853 – 4 September 1870
- Born: 5 May 1826; Granada, Spain
- Died: 11 July 1920 (aged 94); Madrid, Spain
- Burial: St Michael's Abbey, Farnborough
- Spouse: Napoléon III, Emperor of the French (m. 1853; died 1873)
- Issue: Louis-Napoléon, Prince Imperial
Names
- María Eugenia Ignacia Agustina de Palafox y Kirkpatrick
- House: Bonaparte (by marriage)
- Father: Cipriano de Palafox y Portocarrero, 8th Count of Montijo
- Mother: María Manuela Enriqueta Kirkpatrick de Closeburn y Grivegnée

Eugénie de Montijo (French: [øʒeni də mɔ̃tiʒo]; born María Eugenia Ignacia Agustina de Palafox y Kirkpatrick; 5 May 1826 – 11 July 1920) was the Empress of the French from her marriage to Napoleon III on 30 January 1853 until he was overthrown on 4 September 1870. From 28 July to 4 September 1870, she was the de facto head of state of France.

Born to prominent Spanish nobility, Eugénie was educated in France, Spain, and the United Kingdom. As Empress, she used her influence to champion "authoritarian and clerical policies"; her involvement in politics earned her much criticism from contemporaries. Napoléon and Eugénie had one child together, Louis-Napoléon, Prince Imperial (1856–1879). After the fall of the Empire, the three lived in exile in England; Eugénie outlived both her husband and son and spent the remainder of her life working to commemorate their memories and the memory of the Second French Empire.

== Youth ==
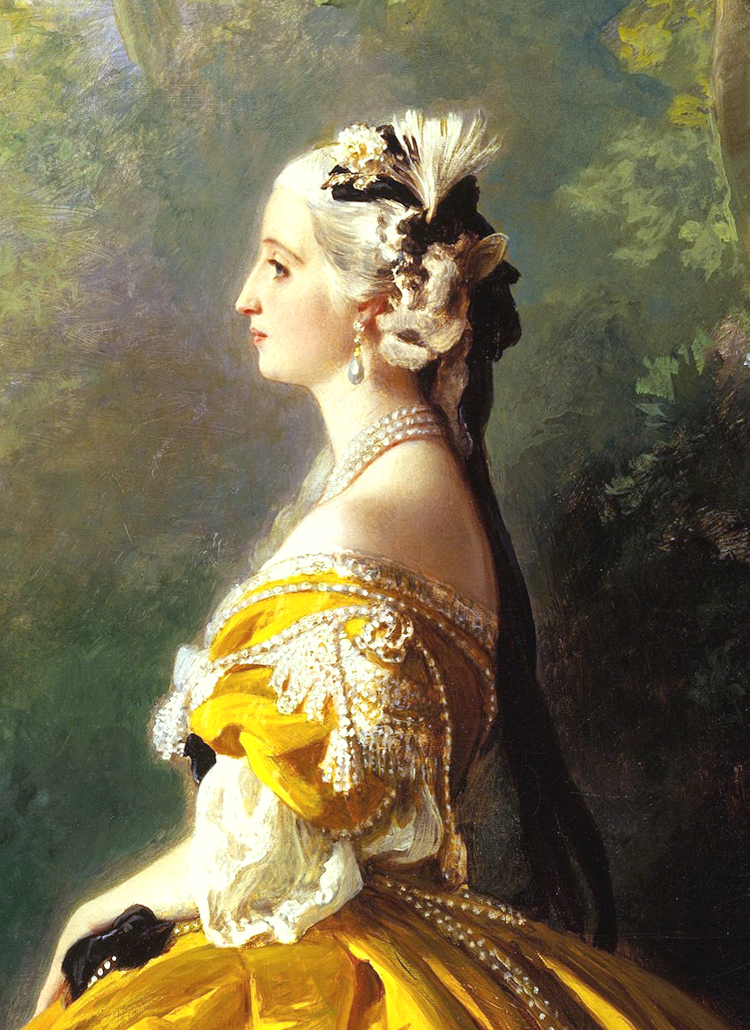
Empress Eugénie as Marie Antoinette (by Franz Xaver Winterhalter, 1854)

María Eugenia Ignacia Agustina was born on 5 May 1826 in Granada, Spain. She was the youngest child and daughter of Don Cipriano de Palafox y Portocarrero, three times Grandee of Spain, whose titles included 13th Duke of Peñaranda de Duero, 9th Count of Montijo, 15th Count of Teba, 8th Count of Ablitas, 8th Count of Fuentidueña, 14th Marquis of Ardales, 17th Marquis of Moya and 13th Marquis of la Algaba, and María Manuela Enriqueta Kirkpatrick de Closeburn y Grivegnée. María de Grivegnée was the daughter of the Scots-born William Kirkpatrick of Closeburn (1764–1837), who became United States consul to Málaga, and later was a wholesale wine merchant, and his wife, Marie Françoise de Grivegnée (born 1769), daughter of Liège-born Henri, Baron de Grivegnée and Spanish wife, Doña Francisca Antonia de Gallegos y Delgado (1751–1853). In later life, the Empress told Lady Helena Gleichen that "she was born in the middle of an earthquake and her mother was carried out of the house and laid under a tree, her family ever after used to mock at her saying, 'The mountain was in travail and it brought forth a mouse.'"

Eugenia's elder sister, María Francisca de Sales de Palafox Portocarrero y Kirkpatrick, nicknamed "Paca", who inherited most of the family honours and was 14th Duchess of Peñaranda, Grandee of Spain and 9th Countess of Montijo, a title later ceded to Eugenia, married the 15th Duke of Alba in 1849. Until her marriage in 1853, Eugenia variously used the titles Countess of Teba or Countess of Montijo. However, some family titles were inherited by her elder sister, through which they passed to the House of Alba. After the death of her father, Eugenia became the 9th Countess of Teba and is named as such in the Almanach de Gotha (1901 edition). After Eugenia's demise, all titles of the Montijo family came to the Fitz-Jameses (the Dukes of Alba and Berwick).

On 18 July 1834, María Manuela and her daughters left Madrid for Paris, fleeing a cholera outbreak and the dangers of the First Carlist War. The previous day, Eugenia had witnessed a riot and murder in the square outside their residence, Casa Ariza.

Eugénie de Montijo, as she became known in France, was formally educated mostly in Paris, beginning at the fashionable, traditionalist Convent of the Sacré Cœur from 1835 to 1836. A more compatible school was the progressive Gymnase Normal, Civil et Orthosomatique, from 1836 to 1837, which appealed to her athletic side (a school report praised her strong liking for athletic exercise, and although an indifferent student, that her character was "good, generous, active and firm"). In 1837, Eugénie and Paca briefly attended a boarding school for girls on Royal York Crescent in Clifton, Bristol, to learn English. Eugénie was teased as "Carrots" for her red hair and tried to run away to India, making it as far as climbing on board a ship at Bristol docks. In August 1837, they returned to school in Paris. However, much of the girls' education took place at home, under the tutelage of English governesses Miss Cole and Miss Flowers, and family friends such as Prosper Mérimée and Henri Beyle.

In March 1839, on the death of their father in Madrid, the girls left Paris to rejoin their mother there. In Spain, Eugénie grew up into a headstrong and physically daring young woman, devoted to horseriding and a range of other sports. She was rescued from drowning and twice attempted suicide after romantic disappointments. She was very interested in politics and became devoted to the Bonapartist cause, under the influence of Eleanore Gordon, a former mistress of Louis Napoléon. Due to her mother's role as a lavish society hostess, Eugénie became acquainted with Queen Isabella II of Spain and the prime minister Ramón Narváez. María Manuela was increasingly anxious to find a husband for her daughter and took her on trips to Paris again in 1849 and England in 1851.

== Marriage ==
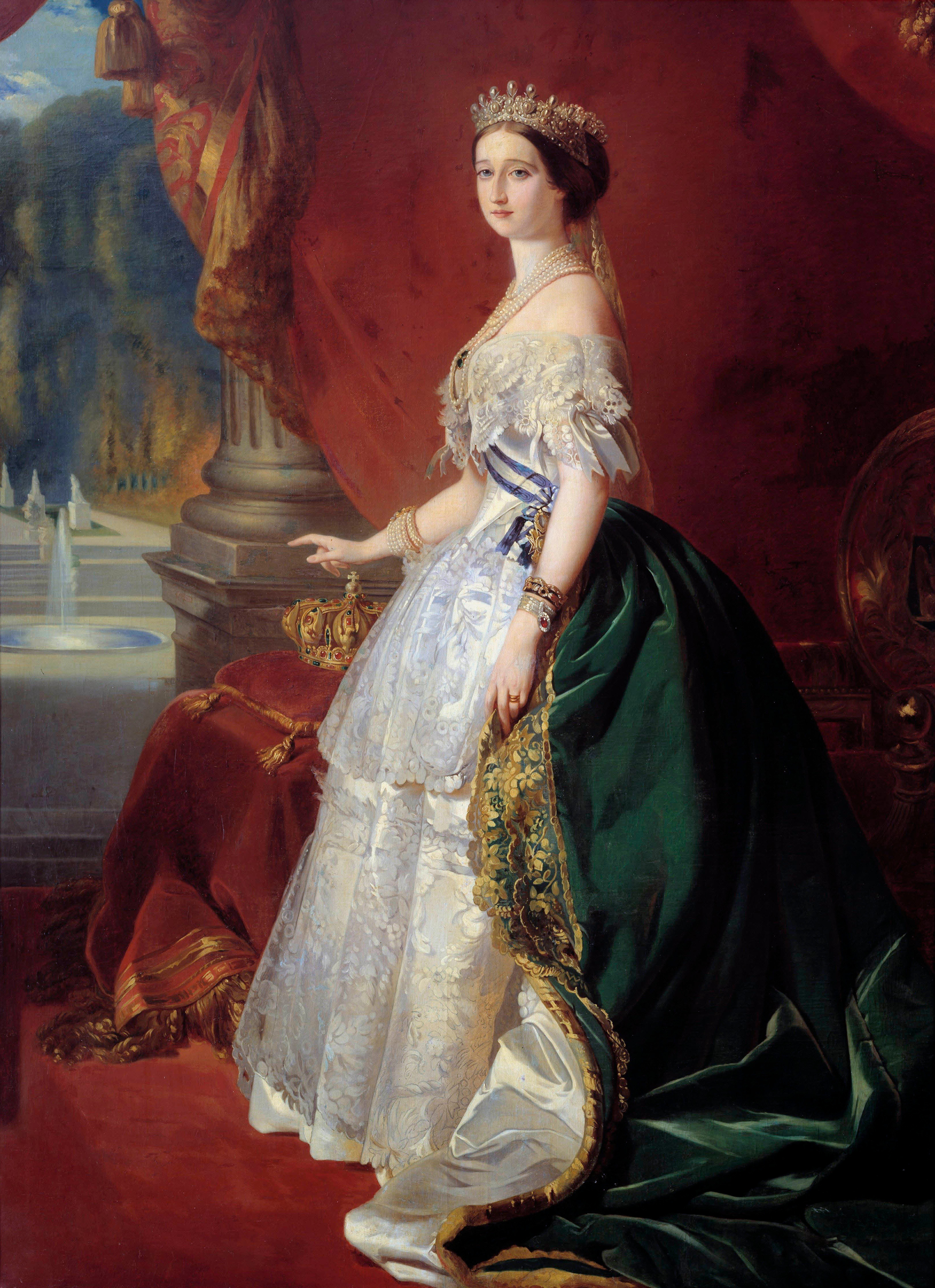
Portrait by Franz Xaver Winterhalter, 1853

She first met Prince Louis Napoléon after he had become president of the Second Republic with her mother at a reception given by the "prince-president" at the Élysée Palace on 12 April 1849. "What is the road to your heart?" Napoleon demanded to know. "Through the chapel, Sire", she answered.

In a speech on 22 January 1853, Napoleon III, after becoming emperor, formally announced his engagement, saying, "I have preferred a woman whom I love and respect to a woman unknown to me, with whom an alliance would have had advantages mixed with sacrifices". They were wed on 29 January 1853 in a civil ceremony at the Tuileries, and on the 30th, there was a grander religious ceremony at Notre Dame.

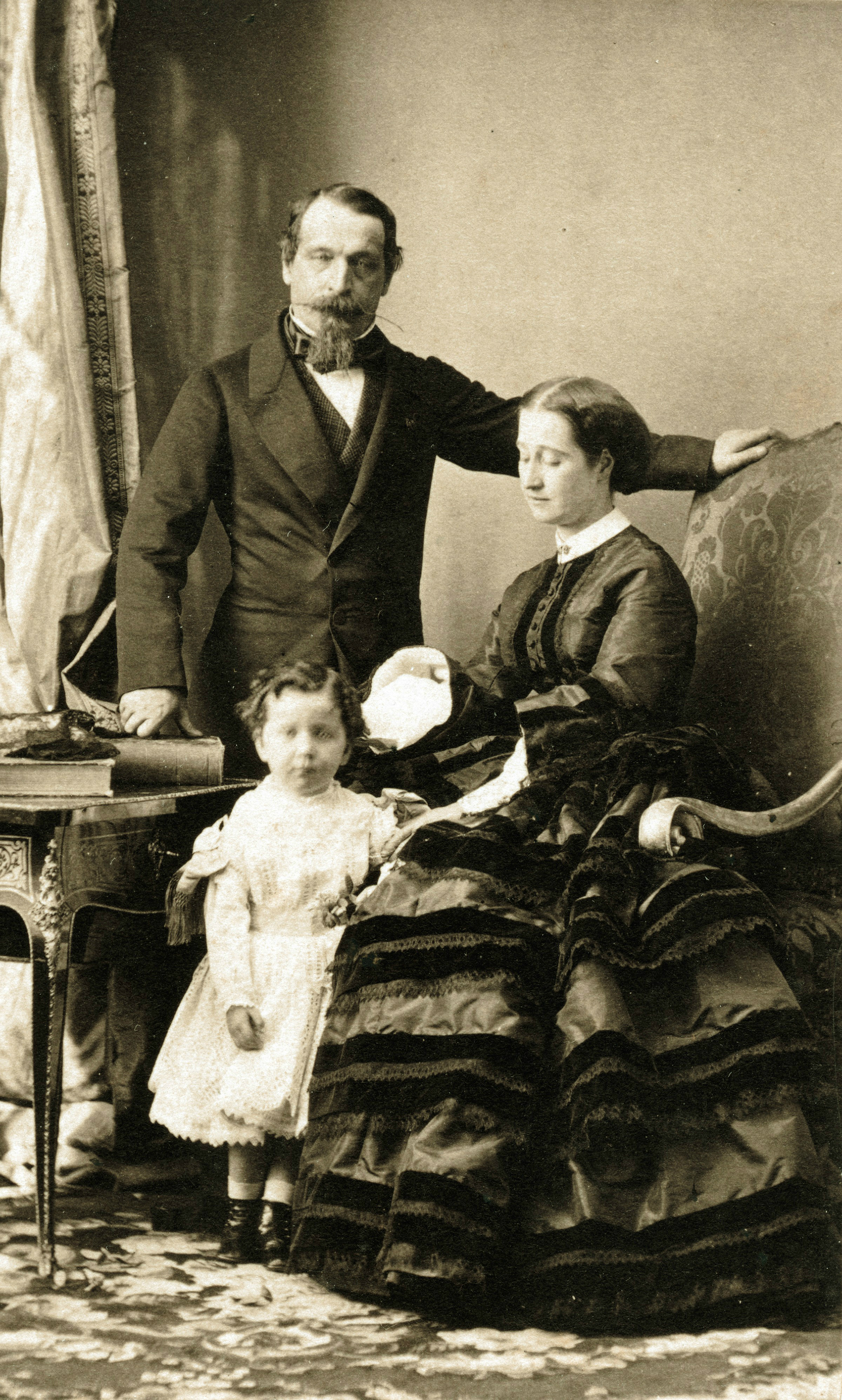
Emperor Napoleon III and Empress Eugénie with their son

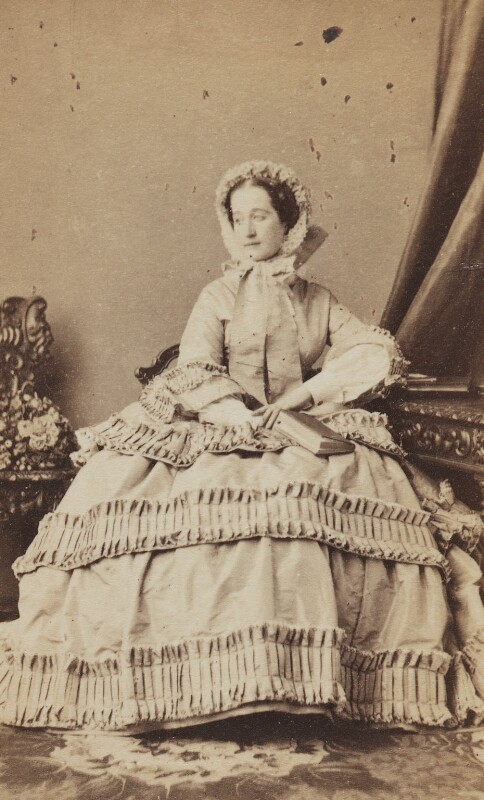
Empress Eugénie of the French, 1858

The marriage had come after considerable activity concerning who would make a suitable match, often toward titled royals and with an eye to foreign policy. The final choice was opposed in many quarters. Eugénie was considered of too little social standing by some. In the United Kingdom, The Times made light of the latter concern, emphasizing that the parvenu Bonapartes were marrying into Grandees and one of the most important established houses in the peerage of Spain: "We learn with some amusement that this romantic event in the annals of the French Empire has called forth the strongest opposition and provoked the utmost irritation. The Imperial family, the Council of Ministers, and even the lower coteries of the palace or its purlieus, all affect to regard this marriage as an amazing humiliation..."

Eugénie found childbearing extraordinarily difficult. An initial miscarriage in 1853, after a three-month pregnancy, frightened and soured her. On 16 March 1856, after a two-day labor that endangered both mother and child, and from which Eugénie made a prolonged recovery, the empress gave birth to an only son, Napoléon Eugène Louis Jean Joseph Bonaparte, styled Prince Impérial.

After marriage, it did not take long for her husband to stray as Eugénie found sex with him "disgusting". It is doubtful that she allowed further approaches by her husband once she had given him an heir. He subsequently resumed his "petites distractions" with other women.

== Empress ==
=== Public life ===
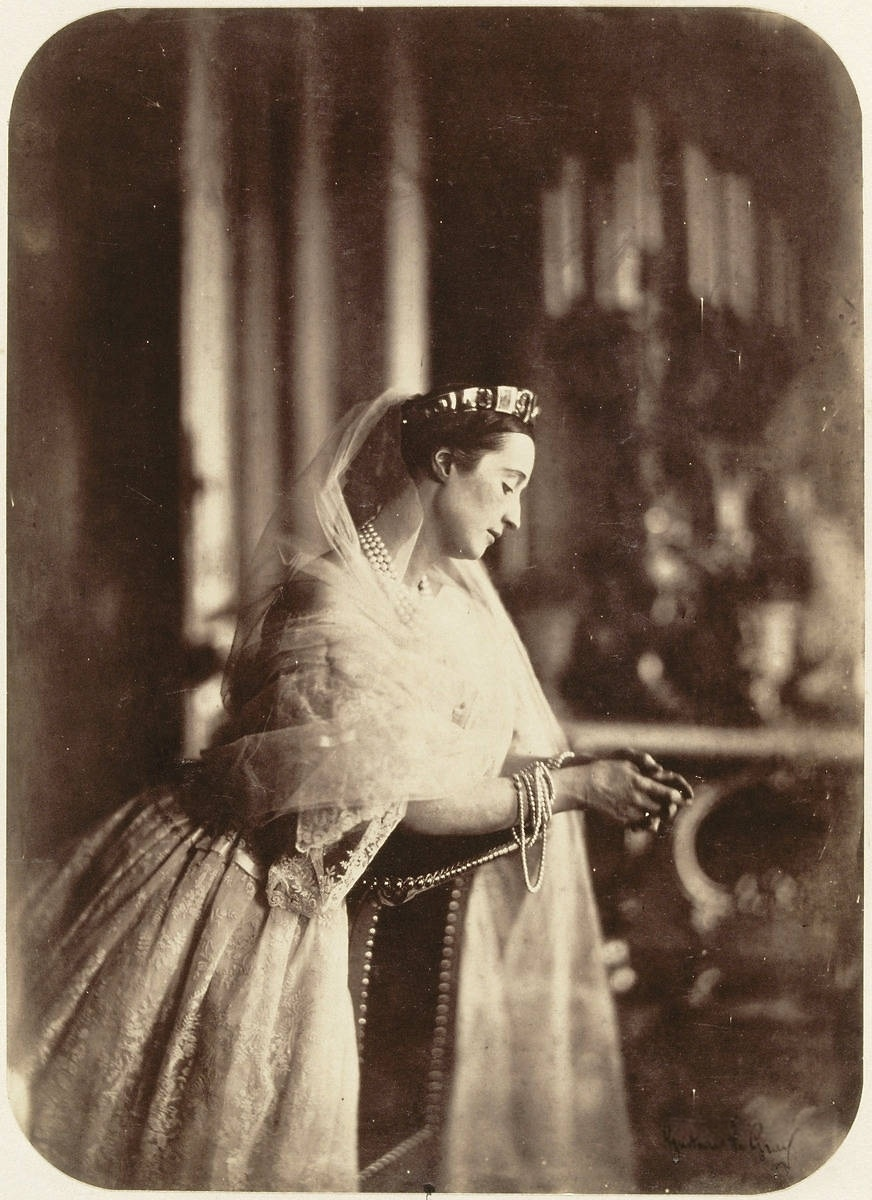
Eugénie de Montijo – the last empress of the French – in a photograph by Gustave Le Gray, c. 1856

Eugénie faithfully performed the duties of an empress, entertaining guests and accompanying the emperor to balls, opera, and theater. After her marriage, her ladies-in-waiting consisted of six (later twelve) dames du palais, most of whom were chosen from among the acquaintances to the empress before her marriage, headed by the Grand-Maitresse Anne Debelle, Princesse d'Essling, and the dame d'honneur, Pauline de Bassano. In 1855 Franz Xaver Winterhalter painted The Empress Eugénie Surrounded by her Ladies in Waiting, where it depicted Eugénie, sitting beside the Grand-Maitresse in a countryside setting, with eight of her ladies-in-waiting.

She traveled to Egypt for the official opening of the Suez Canal and represented her husband whenever he traveled outside France. In 1860, she visited Algiers with Napoleon. She strongly advocated equality for women; she pressured the Ministry of National Education to give the first baccalaureate diploma to a woman and tried unsuccessfully to induce the Académie Française to elect the writer George Sand as its first female member.

Her husband often consulted her on important questions. She acted as regent during his absences in 1859, 1865 and 1870, as he often accompanied his soldiers on the battlefield to motivate them during the wars. In the 1860s, she often attended meetings of the Council of Ministers, even leading the meetings for a brief space of time in 1866 when her husband was away from Paris. A Catholic and a conservative, her influence countered any liberal tendencies in the emperor's policies. Her strong preference was for hereditary monarchy and she made repeated displays of support for members of European royalty who were in crisis, like supporting a restoration of the Bourbons in Spain or trying to help the deposed monarchs of Parma and the Kingdom of the Two Sicilies. According to Nancy Nichols Barker, "her ideas on the principles of government were ill formed and included a jumble of Bonapartism and Legitimism, whose incompatibility she seemed not to even recognize."

She was a staunch defender of papal temporal powers in Italy and of ultramontanism. Because of this she ardently tried to dissuade her husband from recognizing the new Kingdom of Italy, which was formed after Sardinia's 1861 annexation of the Bourbon-ruled Kingdom of the Two Sicilies and all of the pope's territory outside Rome. She also supported keeping a French garrison in Rome to protect the papacy's continued hold on the city. Her opposition to Italian unification earned her the enmity of Victor Emmanuel II of Italy, who stated that "the emperor is weakening visibly and the empress is our enemy and works with the priests. If I had her in my hands I would teach her well what women are good for and with what she should meddle." She also clashed with the French foreign minister Édouard Thouvenel over the question of the French garrison in Rome. Much to Eugénie's chagrin, Thouvenel negotiated an agreement to wind down the French military presence in exchange for a guarantee of papal sovereignty from the new Italian kingdom. The Duke of Persigny blamed her influence when Thouvenel was dismissed by the emperor, declaring to Louis-Napoléon that, "You allow yourself to be ruled by your wife just as I do. But I only compromise my future...whereas you sacrifice your own interests and those of your son and the country at large."

She was blamed for the fiasco of the French intervention in Mexico and the eventual death of Emperor Maximilian I of Mexico. However, the assertion of her clericalism and influence on the side of conservatism is often countered by other authors.

In 1868, Empress Eugénie visited the Dolmabahçe Palace in Constantinople, the home to Pertevniyal Sultan, mother of Abdulaziz, 32nd sultan of the Ottoman Empire. Pertevniyal became outraged by the forwardness of Eugénie taking the arm of one of her sons while he gave a tour of the palace garden, and she slapped the empress on the stomach as a reminder that they were not in France. According to another account, Pertevniyal perceived the presence of a foreign woman within her quarters of the seraglio as an insult. She reportedly slapped Eugénie across the face, almost resulting in an international incident.

=== Role in the arts ===
The Empress possessed one of the most important jewellery collections of her time; Catherine Granger recalls that her purchases were estimated at the enormous sum of 3,600,000 francs, a sum to be compared with the 200,000 francs devoted to the purchase of works of art for her personal collection. The American jeweller Charles Tiffany, who had already acquired the French crown jewels, bought most of the former Empress's jewels from the government and sold them to the ladies of American high society.

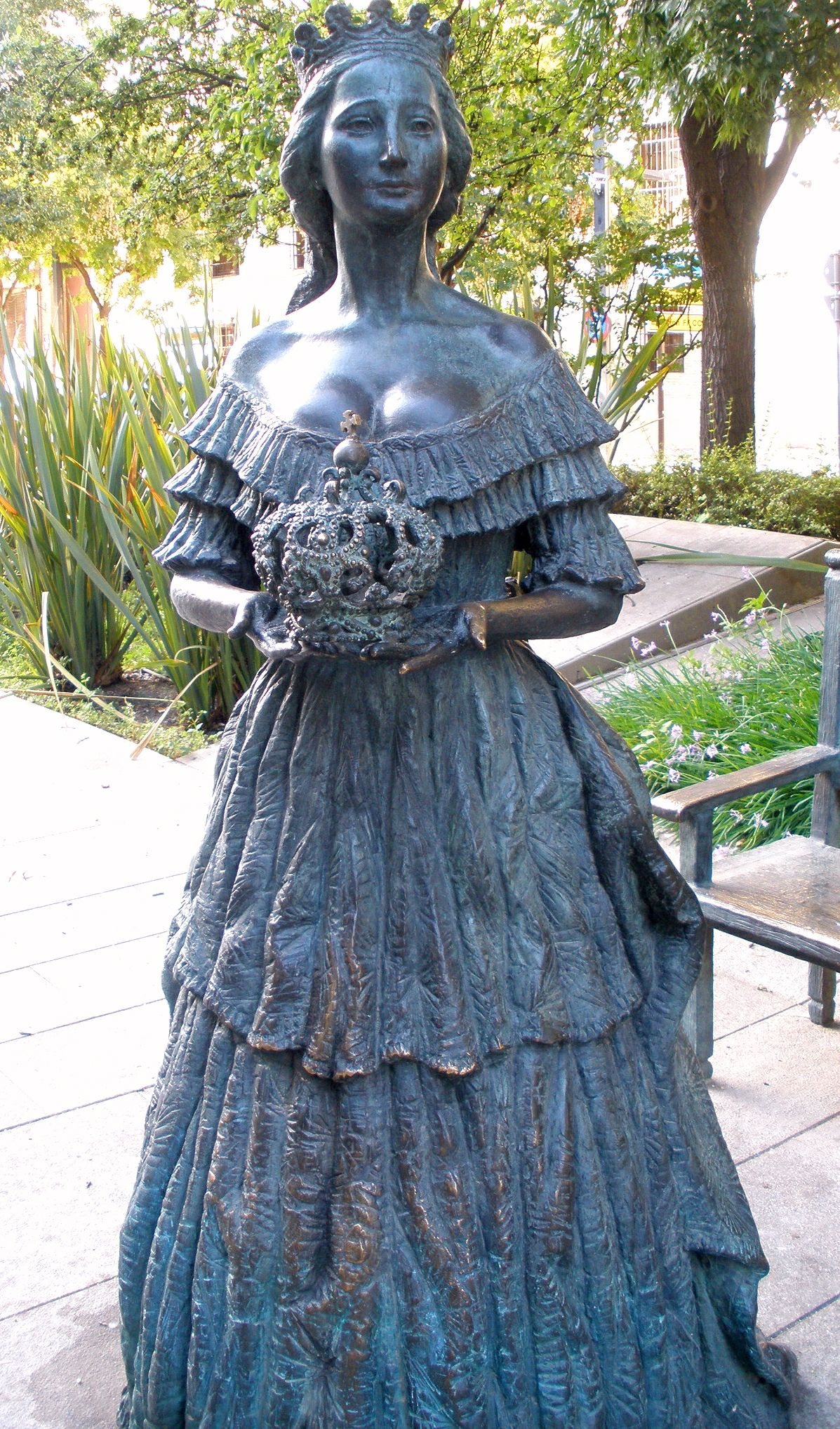
Eugénie de Montijo in Granada

The empress was "perhaps the last Royal personage to have a direct and immediate influence on fashion". She set the standard for contemporary fashion at a time when the luxury industries of Paris were flourishing. Gowns, colors, and hairstyles "à l'impératrice" were avidly copied from the empress throughout Europe and America. She was famous for her large crinolines and for rotating her outfits throughout the day, with a different dress for the morning, afternoon, evening, and night. The British satirical magazine Punch christened her variously as the "Queen of Fashion", "Imperatrice de la Mode", "Countess of Crinoline", and "Goddess of the Bustles". She never wore the same gown twice, and in this way commissioned and acquired an enormous wardrobe, which she disposed of in annual sales to benefit charity. Her favored couturier, Charles Frederick Worth, provided hundreds of gowns to her over the years and was appointed the official dressmaker to the court in 1869. In the late 1860s, she caused a shift in fashion by turning against the crinoline and adopting Worth's "new" slimmer silhouettes with the skirt gathered in the back over a bustle.

Eugénie's influence on contemporary taste extended into the decorative arts. She was a great admirer of Queen Marie Antoinette and decorated her interiors in revivals of the Louis XV and Louis XVI styles. A general vogue arose for 18th century French design, becoming known as "Style Louis XVI Impératrice". According to Nancy Nichols Barker, her admiration for Marie Antoinette "was nearly an obsession. She collected her portraits and trinkets, lived in her suite at Saint-Cloud, had constructed a small model of the Petit Trianon in the park, and frequently engaged Hübner in lugubrious conversation about the fate of the martyred queen."

In 1863, the Empress established a museum of Asian art called the musée Chinois (Chinese Museum) at the Palace of Fontainebleau. She carefully curated the displays of her museum, constituting diplomatic gifts given to her by an embassy from Siam in 1860, as well as loot taken from the Old Summer Palace outside Beijing by French troops during the Second Opium War. General Charles Cousin-Montauban had sent crates of this loot to Eugénie as a gift, with the first shipment arriving in February 1861. The collection numbers some 800 objects, with 300 coming from the sack of the Summer Palace.

=== Biarritz ===
In 1854, Emperor Napoleon III and Eugénie bought several acres of dunes at Biarritz in the southwest of France near the Spanish border, and gave the engineer Dagueret the task of establishing a summer home surrounded by gardens, woods, meadows, a pond and outbuildings. Napoleon III chose the location near Spain so his wife would not get homesick for her native country. The house was called the Villa Eugénie, today the Hôtel du Palais. The presence of the imperial couple attracted other European royalty like the British monarchs Queen Victoria and the Spanish king Alfonso XIII and made Biarritz well-known.

=== Role in Franco-Prussian War ===
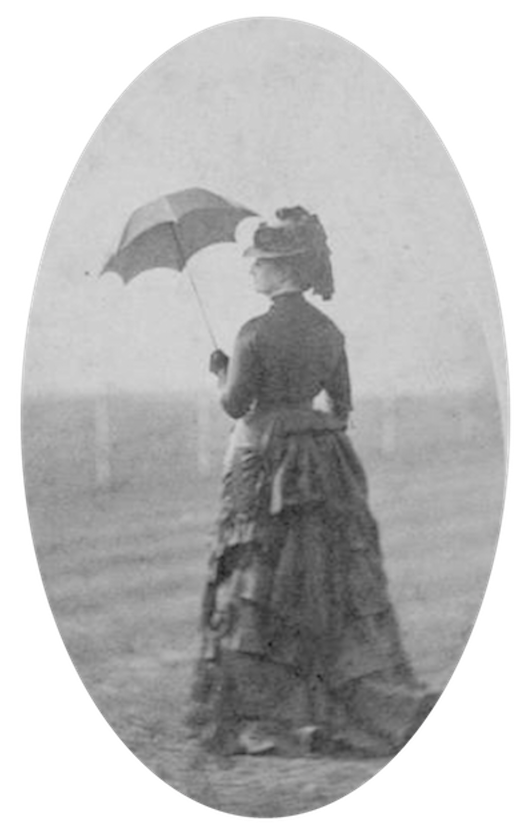
Empress Eugénie holding a small parasol, mid-1870s

The Empress held anti-Prussian views and disliked the North German chancellor, Otto von Bismarck, for what she perceived as his "meddling" in Spanish affairs. She believed that France's status as a great power was under threat, and that a victory against Prussia would secure her son's future rule. Maxime du Camp claimed that, after the Prussian victory over Austria in 1866, the Empress would often state that "Catholic France could not support the neighborhood of a great Protestant power." In 1870, when the diplomatic crisis which would lead to the Franco-Prussian War erupted over Prussia's Hohenzollern candidate for the Spanish throne, Eugénie was key in pushing her husband toward supporting what she called "my war" ("C'est ma guerre"). In one instance she pointed to the couple's son in front of her husband and declared "this child will never reign unless we repair the misfortunes of Sadowa". Adolphe Thiers included her, the foreign secretary the Duc de Gramont, Émile Ollivier, and the military in the pro-war camp behind the Emperor, who was himself indecisive.

After the outbreak of the Franco-Prussian War, Eugénie remained in Paris as Regent while Napoleon III and the Prince Imperial travelled to join the troops at the German front. When the news of several French defeats reached Paris on 7 August, it was greeted with disbelief and dismay. Prime Minister Émile Ollivier and the chief of staff of the army, Marshal Le Bœuf, both resigned, and Eugenie took it upon herself to name a new government. She chose General Cousin-Montauban, better known as the count of Palikao, 74 years old, as her new prime minister. The count of Palikao named Maréchal Francois Achille Bazaine, the commander of the French forces in Lorraine, as the new overall military commander. Napoleon III proposed returning to Paris, realizing that he was doing no good for the army. The empress responded by telegraph: "Don't think of coming back unless you want to unleash a terrible revolution. They will say you quit the army to flee the danger." The emperor agreed to remain with the army but sent his son back to the capital. With the empress directing the country and Bazaine commanding the army, the emperor no longer had any real role to play. At the front, the emperor told Marshal Le Bœuf, "we've both been dismissed."

The army was ultimately defeated, and Napoleon III gave himself up to the Prussians at the Battle of Sedan. The news of the capitulation reached Paris on 3 September. When the empress received word that the emperor and the army were prisoners, she reacted by shouting at the Emperor's personal aide, "No! An emperor does not capitulate! He is dead!...They are trying to hide it from me. Why didn't he kill himself! Doesn't he know he has dishonored himself?!". Later, when hostile crowds formed near the Tuileries Palace and the staff began to flee, the empress slipped out with one of her entourage and sought sanctuary with her American dentist, Thomas W. Evans, who took her to Deauville. From there, on 7 September, she took the yacht of a British official to England. In the meantime, on 4 September, a group of republican deputies proclaimed the return of the Republic, and the creation of a Government of National Defense.

From 5 September 1870 until 19 March 1871, Napoleon III and his entourage, including Joseph Bonaparte's grandson Louis Joseph Benton, were held in comfortable captivity in a castle at Wilhelmshöhe, near Kassel. Eugénie traveled incognito to Germany to visit Napoleon.

== After the Franco-Prussian War ==
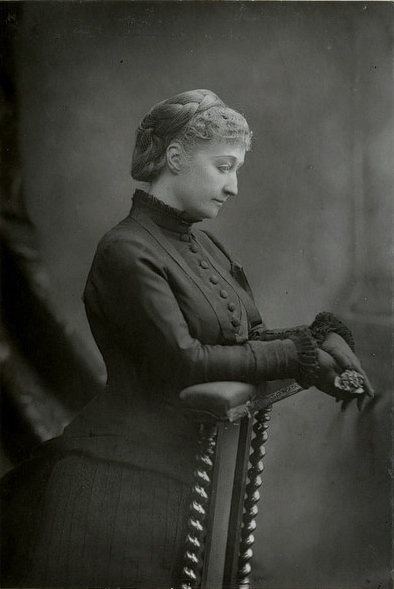
Empress Eugénie in mourning for her son, 1880

When the Second Empire was overthrown after France's defeat in the Franco-Prussian War, the empress and her husband took permanent refuge in England and settled at Camden Place in Chislehurst, Kent. Her husband, Napoleon III, died in 1873, and her son died in 1879 while fighting in the Zulu War in South Africa, with Eugénie visiting his death site on the first anniversary. Before her son's death and after she was widowed, she attempted to join Bonapartists and Legitimists in political alliance against the French Third Republic by making overtures to the Count of Chambord (the Legitimist claimant to the throne of France) and proposing that he adopt her son. The idea was rejected by the Count of Chambord. In 1885, she moved to Farnborough Hill in Farnborough, Hampshire, and to the Villa Cyrnos (named after the ancient Greek for Corsica), which was built for her at Cape Martin, between Menton and Nice, where she lived in retirement.

After the deaths of her husband and son, as her health started to deteriorate, she spent some time at Osborne House on the Isle of Wight; her physician recommended she visit Bournemouth which was, in Victorian times, famed as a health spa resort. During an afternoon visit in 1881, she called on the queen of Sweden, at her residence 'Crag Head'. Her health recovered sufficiently to allow her to travel internationally; she is recorded to have visited the Tomb of Yuya and Thuya (KV46) in the Valley of the Kings during its clearance in the spring of 1905, during which visit she sat on a chair that unbeknownst to her was the 3,000-year-old Throne of Princess Sitamun.

Her deposed family's friendly association with the United Kingdom was commemorated in 1887 when she became the godmother of Victoria Eugenie of Battenberg (1887–1969), daughter of Princess Beatrice, who later became queen consort of Alfonso XIII of Spain. She was also close to Empress consort Alexandra Feodorovna of Russia, who last visited her, along with Emperor Nicholas II, in 1909.

On the outbreak of World War I, she donated her steam yacht Thistle to the British Navy. She funded a military hospital at Farnborough Hill as well as made large donations to French hospitals, for which she was appointed Dame Grand Cross of the Order of the British Empire (GBE) in 1919.

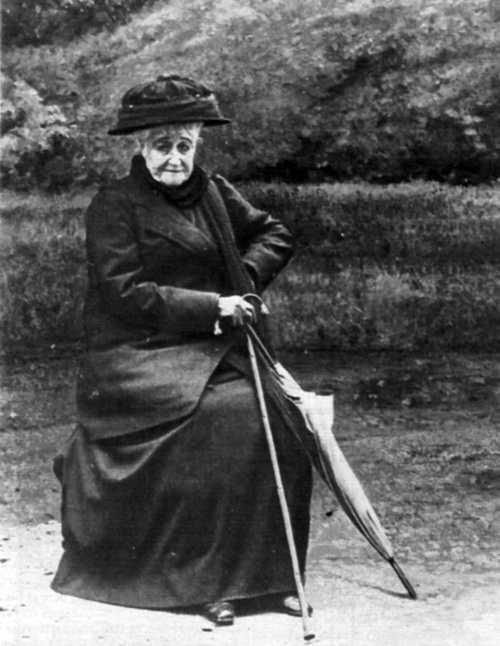
Empress Eugénie in 1920

=== Death, burial and aftermath ===
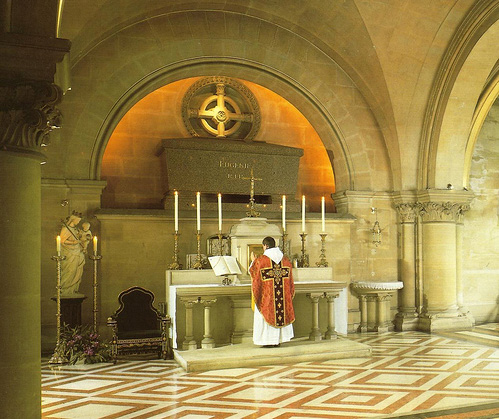
Empress Eugénie's tomb at St Michael's Abbey, Farnborough, England

The former empress died on 11 July 1920, aged 94, during a visit to her grandnephew the 17th Duke of Alba, at the Liria Palace in Madrid in her native Spain, and she is interred in the Imperial Crypt at St Michael's Abbey, Farnborough, with her husband and her son. The British King George V attended her requiem.

After World War I, Eugenie lived long enough to see the collapse of other European monarchies, such as those of Russia, Germany and Austria-Hungary. She left her possessions to various relatives: her Spanish estates went to the grandsons of her sister Paca; the house in Farnborough with all collections to the heir of her son, Prince Victor Bonaparte; Villa Cyrnos to his sister Princess Laetitia of Aosta. Liquid assets were divided into three parts and given to the above relatives except for the sum of 100,000 francs bequeathed to the Committee for Rebuilding the Cathedral of Reims.

== Legacy ==
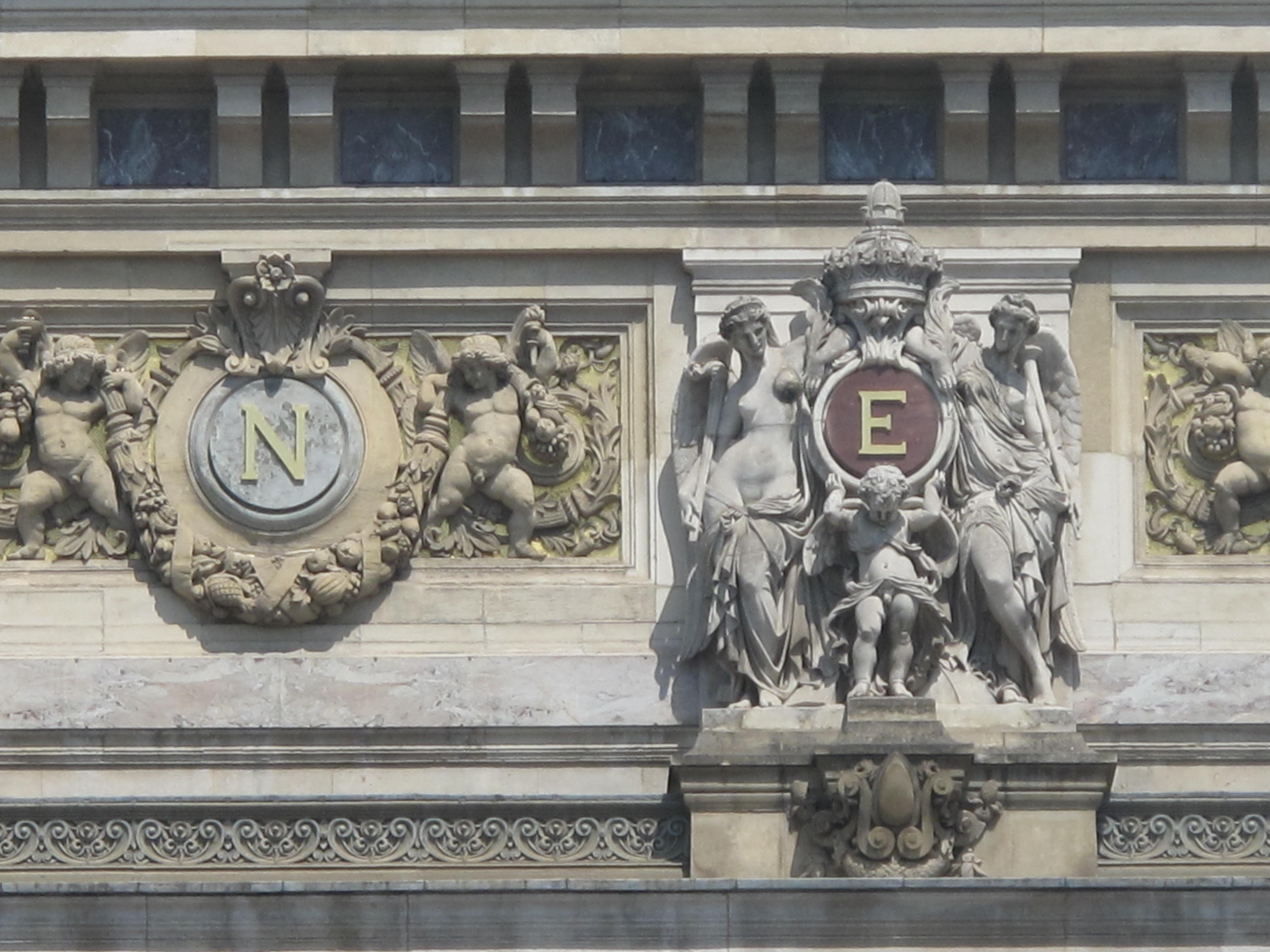
Monogram of "N" for Napoleon III on the façade of the Opéra Garnier in Paris. The "E" is for the empress Eugénie.

The empress has been commemorated in space; the asteroid 45 Eugenia was named after her, and its moon Petit-Prince after the prince imperial.

She had an extensive and unique jewelry collection, most of which later was owned by the Brazilian socialite Aimée de Heeren. De Heeren collected jewelry and was fond of the empress as both were considered to be the "Queens of Biarritz"; both spent summers on the Côte Basque. Impressed by the elegance, style and design of the jewelry of the neo-classical era, in 1858, she had a boutique in the Royal Palace under the name Royale Collections.

She was honoured by John Gould who gave the white-headed fruit dove the scientific name Ptilinopus eugeniae.

=== In popular culture ===
George W. M. Reynolds's penny dreadful The Empress Eugenie's Boudoir tells of the goings-on in the French court during the days of the Second Empire and features the titular empress as one of its lead characters.

Named for the empress, the Eugénie hat is a style of women's chapeau worn dramatically tilted and drooped over one eye; its brim is folded up sharply at both sides in the style of a riding topper, often with one long ostrich plume streaming behind it. The hat was popularized by film star Greta Garbo and enjoyed a vogue in the early 1930s, becoming "hysterically popular". More representative of the empress' actual apparel, however, was the late 19th-century fashion of the Eugénie paletot, a women's greatcoat with bell sleeves and a single button enclosure at the neck.

== Honours ==
- 475th Dame of the Royal Order of Queen Maria Luisa of Spain, 6 March 1853
- Dame of the Order of Saint Isabel of Portugal, 1854
- Grand Cross of the Imperial Order of Saint Charles of the Mexican Empire, 10 April 1865
- Honorary Dame Grand Cross of the Order of the British Empire, 1919
- Dame of the Order of the Starry Cross of Austria

== Film portrayals ==
- In Suez (1938), Loretta Young plays her as the love interest of Ferdinand de Lesseps.
- In Juarez (1939), she was played by Gale Sondergaard, portrayed as a ruthless consort who joins her husband in setting Austrian Archduke Maximilian on the throne of Mexico, and then abandons him.
- In Violetas Imperiales (1932, 1952): Set in 19th-century Granada, Eugénie de Montijo (played by Simone Valère) asks a gypsy girl, Violetta (played by Carmen Sevilla), to read her fortune in her hand. Emboldened by Violetta's prediction that she will become a queen, Eugénie heads for Paris.
- In The Song of Bernadette (1943), she is played by Patricia Morison; she credits the waters of Lourdes with curing the prince imperial.
- A Spanish film Eugenia de Montijo was made in 1944, with Amparo Rivelles playing the title role.
- In The Diving Bell and the Butterfly (2007), Emma de Caunes plays her during a fantasy sequence.
- In the miniseries Sisi (2009), she is portrayed by Hungarian actress Andrea Osvart.

== Arms ==
Heraldry of Empress Eugénie

Coat of arms as empress of the French
(1853–1870)

Coat of arms as dame of the Order of Queen María Luisa
(1853–1920)

== See also ==
- Arenenberg – Estate and chateau in Switzerland
- Eugénie Archipelago – Archipelago in the Peter the Great Gulf, Russia
- Hispagnolisme – French aesthetic craze for Spanish things
- L'Empereur, sa femme et le petit prince – 19th century French folk song

== Citations ==
Eugénie de Montijo House of Bonaparte Born: 5 May 1826 Died: 11 July 1920
French royalty
Vacant Title last held by Maria Amalia of Naples and Sicily as Queen of the French	Empress of the French; 30 January 1853–11 January 1871	Monarchy abolished
Titles in pretence
Vacant Title last held by Marie Louise of Austria	— TITULAR — Empress of the French; 11 January 1871 – 9 January 1873; Reason for succession failure: Empire replaced by Republic	Vacant Title next held by Clémentine of Belgium
Spanish nobility
Preceded by Cipriano de Palafox	Countess of Teba; 1839–1920	Succeeded by Eugenia María Fitz-James Stuart
Preceded by Cipriano de Palafox	Marquise of Ardales; 1839–1920	Succeeded by Jacobo Fitz-James Stuart
