= María Manuela Kirkpatrick y Grivegnée =

Spanish noble and courtier

María Manuela Kirkpatrick
- Countess of Montijo
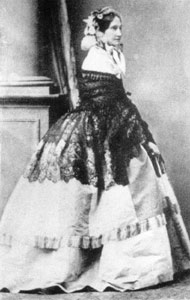
- Born: 24 February 1794; Málaga, Spain
- Died: 22 November 1879 (aged 85)
- Spouses: Cipriano de Palafox y Portocarrero, 8th Count of Montijo (m. 1817; died 1839)
- Issue: María Francisca, Duchess of Alba; Eugénie, Empress of the French
- Father: William Kirkpatrick
- Mother: Marie Françoise de Grevignée

Doña María Manuela Enriqueta Kirkpatrick de Closeburn y Grivegnée, Countess of Montijo (24 February 1794 – 22 November 1879), was a Spanish noble and courtier, the mother of Eugénie, Empress of the French. She served as Camarera mayor de Palacio to queen Isabella II of Spain in 1847-1848.

== Early life ==
She was born in Málaga, Spain, the daughter of an expatriate Scotsman, William Kirkpatrick, a wine merchant and consul of the United States of America, and his Liège-born wife, Marie Françoise de Grevignée, whose sister Catherine married the French diplomat Mathieu de Lesseps.

== Personal life ==
María was brilliant, vivacious and talented. On 15 December 1817, she married Don Cipriano de Palafox y Portocarrero, Count de Teba (1785–1839), afterwards Count de Montijo, Marquis de Algava, and Duke of Granada, Duke of Peñaranda, a grandee of Spain, Bonapartist and veteran of the Napoleonic Wars. They had a son, Francisco "Paco", who died young, and two daughters:

- María Francisca de Sales "Paca" de Palafox Portocarrero y Kirkpatrick (1825–1860), who inherited most of the family honours; she became Duchess of Alba by marriage to Jacobo Fitz-James Stuart, 15th Duke of Alba.
- María Eugenia Ignacia Agustina de Palafox Portocarrero y Kirkpatrick (1826–1920), who married Napoleon III in 1853 and became Empress consort of the French.

In the 1830s, Manuela and the girls moved to Paris for their education. There she renewed her association with George William Frederick Villiers, later Earl of Clarendon, who is rumoured to have been her lover. Manuela also continued her friendship with Prosper Mérimée, whom she had met in Spain and who took great interest in the education of the girls. Manuela was Mérimée's source for the story of Carmen.

In 1837 Manuela briefly moved to England to further her daughters' education, but soon returned to Paris. After the death of her husband, and perhaps the disappointment of Villiers' marriage to an English lady, Manuela engaged in an extensive social life and pursued her ambition to find suitable husbands for her daughters. In 1844 Paca became the wife of one of the richest men in Europe: Jacobo Luis Fitz-James Stuart y Ventimiglia (1821–1881), 8th Duke of Berwick, 8th Earl of Tinmouth, 8th Baron Bosworth, 8th Duke of Liria and Xérica, and 15th Duke of Alba de Tormes. Eugénie did even better; guided by her mother and Mérimée, she married Napoleon III, Emperor of the French.

Manuela lived long enough to see the rise and fall of the Second French Empire, and died in Carabanchel several months after the death of her grandson Napoléon, Prince Imperial. Her great-great-granddaughter Cayetana Fitz-James Stuart was the most titled noble in the world.

Court offices
Preceded by Joaquina Téllez-Girón	Camarera mayor de Palacio to the Queen of Spain; 1847–1848	Succeeded by María de la O Guiráldez
