= Cipriano de Palafox, 8th Count of Montijo =

Spanish nobleman, politician and army officer

The Most Excellent The Count of Montijo GE LH
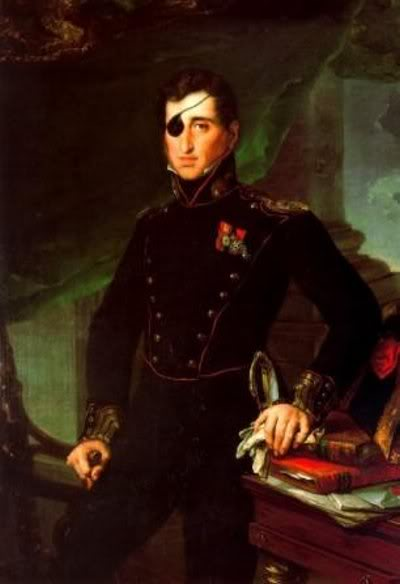
- Cipriano de Palafox, c. 1820

Personal details
- Born: 15 September 1784
- Died: 15 March 1839 (aged 54) Madrid, Spain
- Spouse: María Manuela Kirkpatrick (m. 1817)
- Children: María Francisca, Duchess of Alba; Eugénie, Empress of the French

Cipriano de Palafox y Portocarrero, 8th Count of Montijo, GE, LH (15 September 1784 – 15 March 1839), was a Spanish nobleman, politician and army officer. He was the father-in-law of Napoleon III, Emperor of the French.

== Life and career ==
He was the son of Felipe Palafox y Croy de Habré, a captain in the Walloon Guards, and María de Sales Portocarreño y Zúñiga, 6th Countess of Montijo. Upon the death of his older brother, Eugenio Palafox Portocarrero in 1834, he inherited the County of Montijo, along with the rank of Grandee of Spain. He also held the titles of Count of Miranda de Castañar, Duke of Peñaranda de Duero, Count of Teba, and Marquess of Ardales.

Pro-French in his outlook, he fought for Joseph Bonaparte while the latter was king of Spain, losing an eye in battle and being honoured in Paris by Joseph's brother Napoleon I. After the French defeat, he emigrated to France, following Joseph I. He was kept under close police surveillance until January 1817, when he received a pardon from Ferdinand VII and returned to Spain.

He befriended the famous French writer Prosper Mérimée during the latter's time in Spain in 1830.

From 1837 to 1838, he served as senator for the province of Badajoz.

== Marriage and issue ==
On 15 December 1817, he married María Manuela Kirkpatrick y de Grevignée, a Spanish noblewoman of Scottish ancestry, who served as Camarera mayor de Palacio to Isabella II of Spain.

They had two daughters:

1. María Francisca de Sales "Paca" de Palafox Portocarrero y Kirkpatrick (1825-1860), who became Duchess of Alba by marriage to Jacobo Fitz-James Stuart, 15th Duke of Alba. She was great-grandmother of Cayetana Fitz-James Stuart, 18th Duchess of Alba.
2. María Eugenia Ignacia Agustina de Palafox Portocarrero y Kirkpatrick (1826-1920), who married Napoleon III in 1853 and became Empress consort of the French.

== Titles ==
- Grandee of Spain (1834)
- 15th Duke of Peñaranda de Duero
- 14th Marquess of la Bañeza
- 14th Marquess of Mirallo
- 17th Marquess of Moya
- 13th Marquess of Valdunquillo
- 9th Marquess of Valderrábano
- 8th Marquess of Osera
- 16th Marquess of Villanueva del Fresno
- 16th Marquess of Barcarotta
- 15th Marquess of Ardales
- 7th Marquess of Castañeda
- 8th Count of Montijo
- 8th Count of Ablitas
- 18th Count of Teba
- 10th Count of Baños
- 19th Count of Santa Cruz de la Sierra
- 18th Count of Miranda del Castañar
- 7th Count of Fuentidueña
- 19th Count of San Esteban de Gormaz
- 25th Lord of Moguer
- Prócer del Reino (1834–1835)
