= Juan de Zúñiga, 1st Duke of Peñaranda =

Spanish nobleman

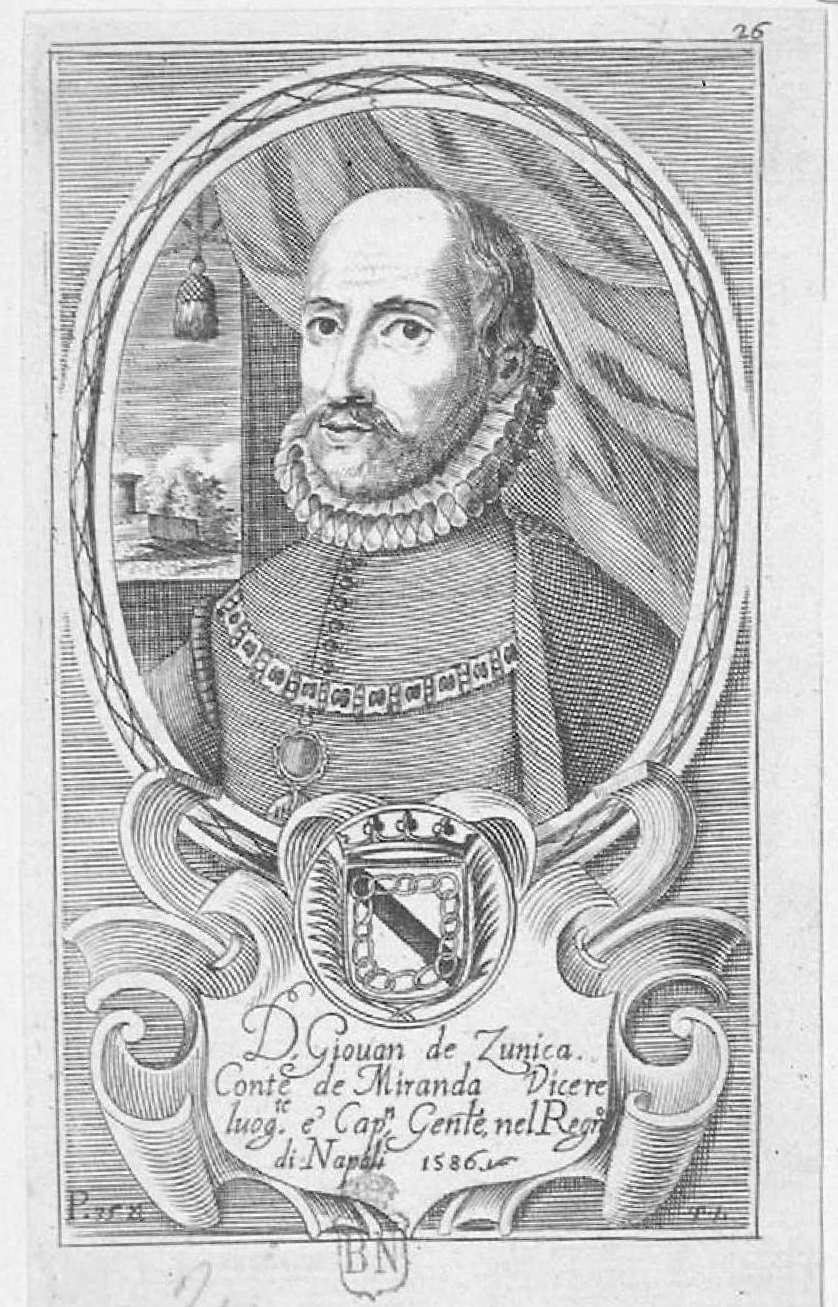
Drawing of the 1st Duke of Peñaranda de Duero

Juan de Zúñiga y Avellaneda, 1st Duke of Peñaranda de Duero (1551 – 4 September 1608) was a Spanish nobleman during the reigns of Philip II and Philip III.

== Biography ==
He was the son of Francisco de Zúñiga y Avellaneda, IV Count of Miranda del Castañar, Grandee of Spain, and his wife María de Bazán y Ulloa, IV Viscountess of the Palaces of la Valduerna. His paternal grandfather was Francisco de Zúñiga Avellaneda y Velasco, Order of the Golden Fleece and Viceroy of Navarre.

He was a Knight of the Military Order of Santiago, the 6th consort count, iure uxoris, of Miranda del Castañar, a title awarded by king Henry IV of Castile on 9 February 1457 and the 1st Duke of Peñaranda, a title awarded by king Philip III on 22 May 1608.

In 1583, under King Philip II, he succeeded Carlo d'Aragona Tagliavia as Viceroy of Catalonia, a position he held until 1586 when he was succeeded by Manrique de Lara y Girón. In 1586, Juan de Zúñiga succeeded Pedro Girón, 1st Duke of Osuna to become the Viceroy of Naples and was succeeded by Enrique de Guzmán, 2nd Count of Olivares in 1595.

He served as President of the Council of Italy and, in 1600–1606, as the President of the Council of Castile, by then at the service of king Philip III of Spain.

Government offices
Preceded by Carlo d'Aragona Tagliavia	Viceroy of Catalonia; 1583–1585	Succeeded by Manrique de Lara y Girón
Preceded by Pedro Téllez-Girón y de la Cueva	Viceroy of Naples; 1586–1595	Succeeded by Enrique de Guzmán
Spanish nobility
Preceded by New creation	Duke of Peñaranda de Duero; 1608	Succeeded by Diego de Zúñiga y Pacheco
