= María Francisca de Sales Portocarrero, 16th Duchess of Peñaranda =

Spanish noblewoman

María Francisca de Sales de Palafox Portocarrero
- 16th Duchess of Peñaranda de Duero; Duchess of Alba
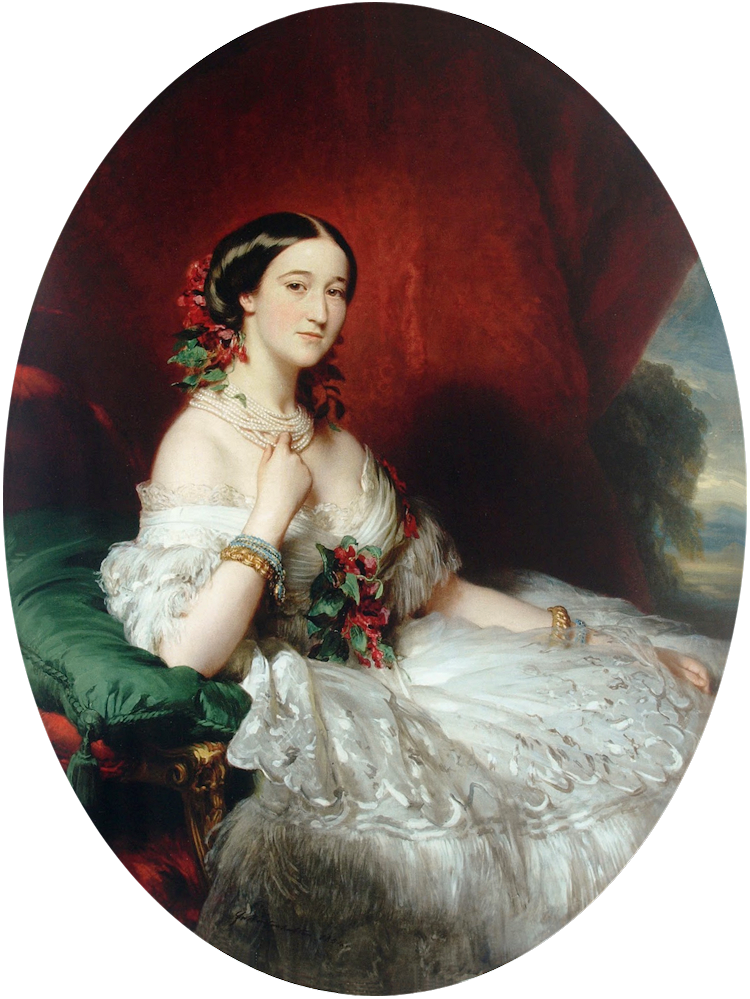
- Portrait by Franz Xaver Winterhalter, 1854
- Born: María Francisca de Sales de Palafox Portocarrero y Kirkpatrick; 29 January 1825; Granada, Spain
- Died: 16 September 1860 (aged 35); Paris, France
- Spouse: Jacobo Fitz-James Stuart, 15th Duke of Alba (m. 1848)
- Issue: Carlos María Fitz-James Stuart y Palafox, 16th Duke of Alba; María de la Asunción Fitz-James Stuart y Palafox, 3rd Duchess of Galisteo; María Luisa Fitz-James Stuart y Palafox, 14th Duchess of Montoro
- Father: Cipriano de Palafox y Portocarrero, 8th Count of Montijo
- Mother: María Manuela Kirkpatrick

María Francisca de Sales "Paca" de Palafox Portocarrero y Kirkpatrick, 16th Duchess of Peñaranda de Duero (29 January 1825 – 16 September 1860), also known as Paca de Alba, was a Spanish noblewoman and the sister of Eugénie de Montijo, Empress of the French. She was the 16th Duchess of Peñaranda de Duero in her own right and a Grandee of Spain, and she inherited many other titles from her father. She was also Duchess of Alba by virtue of her marriage to Jacobo Fitz-James Stuart, 15th Duke of Alba.

== Life and family ==
María Francisca was born in 1825, the elder daughter of Cipriano de Palafox y Portocarrero, 8th Count of Montijo and 15th Duke of Peñaranda de Duero, and his wife, María Manuela Kirkpatrick (daughter of the Scottish-born U.S. consul to Málaga), who provided inspiration for Prosper Mérimée's novella Carmen. Her younger sister, Eugenia, married French emperor Napoleon III in 1853 and became Empress consort of the French.

While she was a child, her family moved to France. After her father's death in 1839, her mother moved back to Spain with the two girls. Her mother was desperate to get her and Eugenia married off, and the sisters became condescendingly known as las condesitas by Madrid society.

The 16th Marquis of Alcañices asked his eldest son, José Osorio y Silva (later the 9th Duke of Sesto), to take charge of introducing the sisters into society. He ended up falling in love with María, and the two remained friends after her marriage. To get closer to María, he became friends with Eugenia. However, Eugenia fell in love with him, and when she found out that her love was not requited, she attempted suicide with a concoction of phosphorus and milk.

As the eldest child, María succeeded to her father's titles – as :

- 16th Duchess of Peñaranda de Duero,
- 10th Marchioness of Valderrábano,
- 17th Marchioness of Villanueva del Fresno and Barcarrota,
- 13th Marchioness of la Algaba,
- 15th Marchioness of La Bañeza,
- 15th Marchioness of Mirallo,
- 14th Marchioness of Valdunquillo,
- 9th Countess of Montijo,
- 11th Countess of Baños
- 17th Countess of Miranda del Castañar,
- 18th Countess of Fuentidueña,
- 13th Countess of Casarrubios del Monte,
- 20th Countess of San Esteban de Gormaz,
- 18th Viscountess of Palacios de la Valduerna.

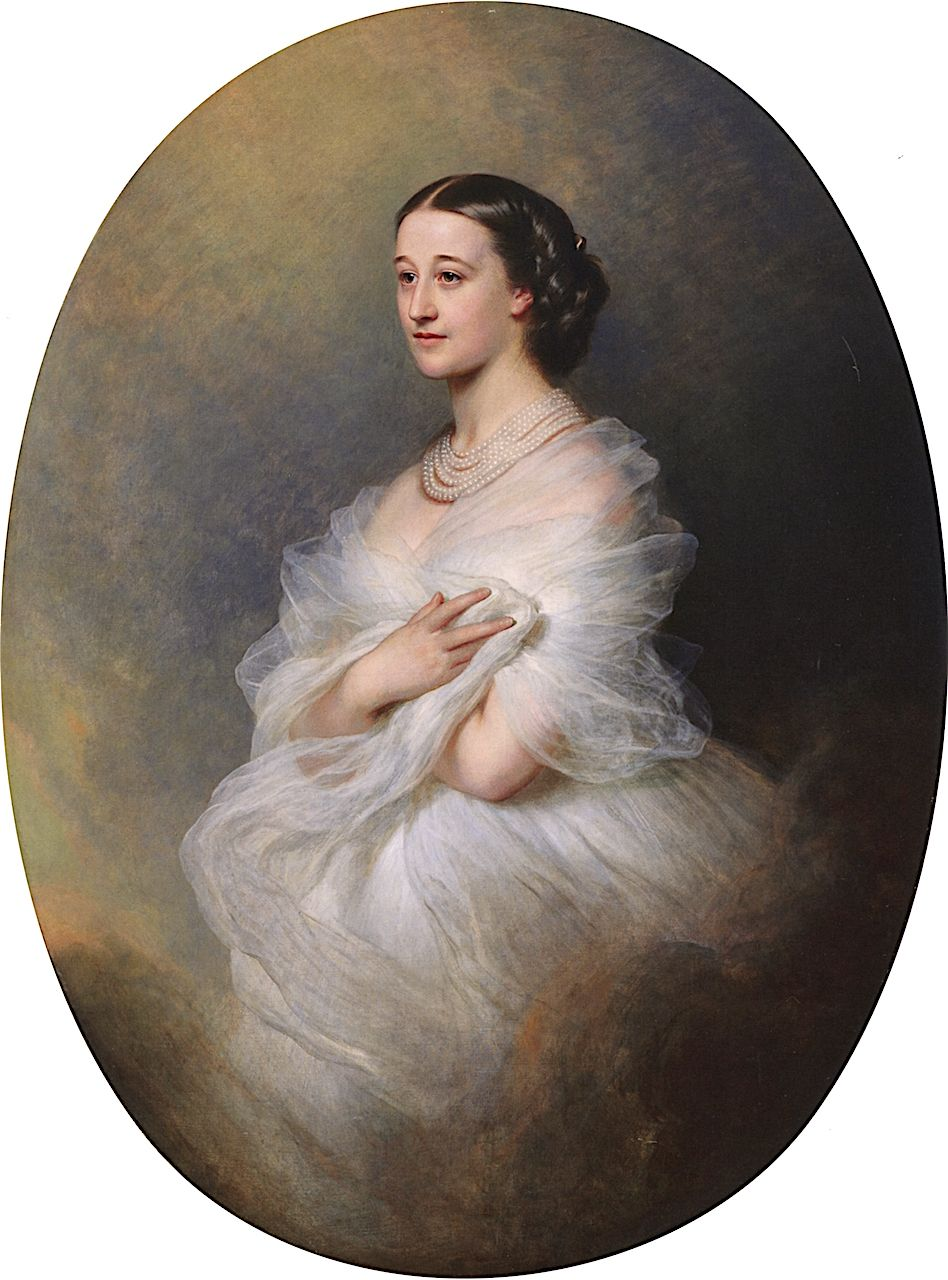
Portrait of the Duchess of Alba (1852) by German artist Franz Xaver Winterhalter

These titles were incorporated into the House of Alba through her marriage to Jacobo Fitz-James Stuart y Ventimiglia, the heir of that house. They married in Madrid on 14 February 1848 and had three children:

- Carlos María Fitz-James Stuart y Palafox, 16th Duke of Alba; married María del Rosario Falcó y Osorio, 12th Countess of Siruela.
- María de la Asunción Fitz-James Stuart y Palafox, 3rd Duchess of Galisteo; married José Mesía Pando, mayor of Madrid and 4th Duke of Tamames.
- María Luisa Fitz-James Stuart y Palafox, 14th Duchess of Montoro; married Luis Fernández de Córdoba y Pérez de Barradas, 14th Duke of Medinaceli.

She was made a Dame of the Order of Queen Maria Luisa. In 1859, she was diagnosed with tuberculosis, although her symptoms suggest leukemia. Her sister wanted to get her out of Madrid and so sent her yacht to Alicante. Accompanied by their mother (unaware of the severity of the disease) and a doctor, she moved to Paris, where she died on 16 September 1860.

Her funeral was held at the Church of the Madeleine in Paris, and her remains were transported to Madrid. There, her friend José Osorio y Silva, who was the mayor of Madrid at that time, held a burial ceremony at the Hermitage of Santa María la Antigua, where she had expressed a wish to be buried. Her body was later moved to the family vault of the House of Alba at the Monastery of Inmaculada Concepción in Loeches, where it remains.

== Bibliography ==
- Ana de Sagrera (1990). Una rusa en España: Sofía, duquesa de Sesto. Espasa-Calpe. ISBN 84-239-2236-7.
- David Baguley, Napoleon III and his regime - an Extravaganza. Louisiana State University Press, 2000. ISBN 0-8071-2624-1.
- John Bierman, Napoleon III and his Carnival Empire. St. Martin's Press, 1988. ISBN 0-312-01827-4.
- Colin Carlin, William Kirkpatrick of Malaga, The Grimsay Press, 2011. ISBN 978-1-84530-071-5
