= Escuelas Patrióticas (Madrid) =

Schools for girls in Madrid, Spain

The Escuelas Patrióticas (Patriotic Schools) were public primary and vocational schools in Madrid, Spain.

== History ==
The schools were established in 1776 by the Real Sociedad Económica Matritense de Amigos del País (Madrid Royal Economic Society of Friends of the Country) for "the incorporation of women into Spain's struggling industries" (Smith 162). Madrid had four of these public schools, with those being San Ginés, San Sebastián, San Martín, and San Andrés. The focus of these schools was to improve needlework skills, as well as introduce the girls to a variety of textile materials, such as linen, canvas and cotton. Each school focused on a designated skill from among weaving, lacemaking, fine threads and artificial flowers. Along with these four schools, the Society also directed other schools that had a focus on education, watchmaking, drawing, saddlery and ornaments.

== Junta de Damas's effects on the schools ==
After the Junta de Damas was created as the female branch of the all-male Real Sociedad Económica in 1787, they immediately took over in supervising these schools, which after 10 years were in poor condition and at risk of closure. The main issues that the schools were facing were “an inconsistent number of students from year to year, uneven production levels, poor quality instruction, and erratic inspection" (Smith 163). The Damas started their reform of the schools by requesting reports from the administrations on their inventory and status, as well as terminating various employees. At all the schools they introduced ayudantas (teaching assistants). These assistants had proven themselves as the most hardworking students, and created an opportunity for younger students to push themselves to attain this honor. In 1792, reading and writing instruction was added to all of the school's curriculum for the first time since they opened, almost twenty years prior. These changes caused a considerable increase in enrollment rates and gained acclaim from the Economic Society, who granted the Damas full control of the finances of the schools in 1797.

== Additional schools ==
The Real Escuela de la Sociedad Económica Matritense (The Royal School of the Madrid Economic Society) was created in September 1790 by the direct initiative of the Junta de Damas, specifically that of the Countess of Torrepalma. As a multidisciplinary school, girls were educated in reading, arithmetic, and needlework, with lessons also being taught on manners and modesty, as well as the Christian doctrine. Madrid was extremely deficient in this area, thus a school providing with this sort of instruction was necessary. It became the model for primary schools later in the nineteenth century that were also sponsored by the Madrid Economic Society and run by the Junta de Damas. The Escuela de Flores Artificiales (The School of Artificial Flowers) was created in 1796. It was also known as the “Queen’s School” and was important because the products created at the school brought a lot of money back to Spain through their exportation. Towards the end of the 18th century, Duchess of Feria opened a school made specifically for young girls from the Inclusa orphanage who had not been adopted by the age of 7. This school, known as the Colegio de Niñas de la Paz (The School of Girls of the Peace), taught the girls basic needle work, as well as literacy skills. Other schools of note were the Escuela de Talabartería (The Saddlery School), which was founded in 1780, the Escuela de Dibujo (The School of Drawing), founded in 1781, and the Escuela de Adornos (The School of Ornaments), founded in 1802.
