= Cristóbal Gregorio Portocarrero, 5th Count of Montijo =

Spanish nobleman, diplomat and statesman (1693–1763)

Cristóbal Gregorio Portocarrero y Funes de Villalpando (Montijo, 2 June 1693 – Madrid, 15 June 1763), 5th Count of Montijo, was a Spanish nobleman, diplomat, and statesman.

== Biography ==
Cristóbal Gregorio Portocarrero y Funes de Villalpando was the son of the 4th Count of Montijo, Cristóbal Portocarrero de Guzmán, and his third wife, María Regalado Funes de Villalpando y Monroy, 4th Marchioness of Osera, Castañeda, and Ugena.

In 1704, his father died, and he inherited all his titles and the title of Grandee of Spain. This family succession coincided with the War of the Spanish Succession, in which he sided with Philip V.

In the summer of 1726, he was part of the "family" retinue that accompanied the Monarchs to the new Royal Palace of La Granja de San Ildefonso. A year later, he was appointed to the position of Gentleman of the chamber of Philip V.

Between 1732 and 1735, Philip V entrusted him with the position of Spanish Ambassador in London, one of the most important embassies at the time. During this period, Spain participated in the War of the Polish Succession, in which Great-Britain remained neutral. In London he met the great tenor Carlo Broschi, better known as Farinelli, to whom he delivered a request from Queen Isabella Farnese for the castrato to come to the Spanish Court, which he accepted in 1737.

The prestige he had achieved as Ambassador in London allowed Portocarrero to become president of the Council of the Indies in 1737. He temporarily left this position to head the Spanish diplomatic delegation to the Diet of Frankfurt in 1741, where the Bavarian Charles VII Albert was elected Holy Roman Emperor, which was a successful outcome for Spain and France. Upon his return to Spain in 1744, he resumed his position as president of the Council of the Indies, and was appointed Mayordomo mayor to Queen Isabella Farnese in 1745.

In 1748, after Ferdinand VI of Spain ascended the Spanish throne, Portocarrero, a confidant of the Queen dowager, was removed from all his duties.

He was awarded the Spanish Order of the Golden Fleece (1713) and the French Order of the Holy Spirit (1746).

=== Marriage and children ===
Cristóbal Gregorio Portocarrero y Funes de Villalpando married María Fernández de Córdoba y Portocarrero (1693–1747), his half-sister's daughter. The marriage produced only one son :

- Cristóbal Pedro de Portocarrero y Fernández de Córdoba (1728–1757), predeceased his father, had one daughter :
  - Doña María Francisca de Sales Portocarrero (1754–1808), his heir and 6th Countess of Montijo.
