= Count of Teba =

Countship of Teba
- Creation date: 1522
- Created by: Charles I
- Peerage: Peerage of Spain
- First holder: Diego Ramírez de Guzmán, 1st Count of Teba
- Present holder: Jaime Patiño y Mitjans, 23rd Count of Teba

Count of Teba (Spanish: Conde de Teba) is a hereditary title in the Peerage of Spain, granted in 1522 by Charles I to Diego Ramírez de Guzmán, son of the 1st Lord of Teba. The name makes reference to the municipality of Teba, in Málaga, Spain.

Eugenia, the 19th Countess (in her own right), became Empress of the French for her marriage to Napoleon III.

The Teba jacket, a popular country attire, bears the name of the title, as the 21st Count of Teba would popularize the garment during the 1920s.

== Counts of Teba (1522) ==
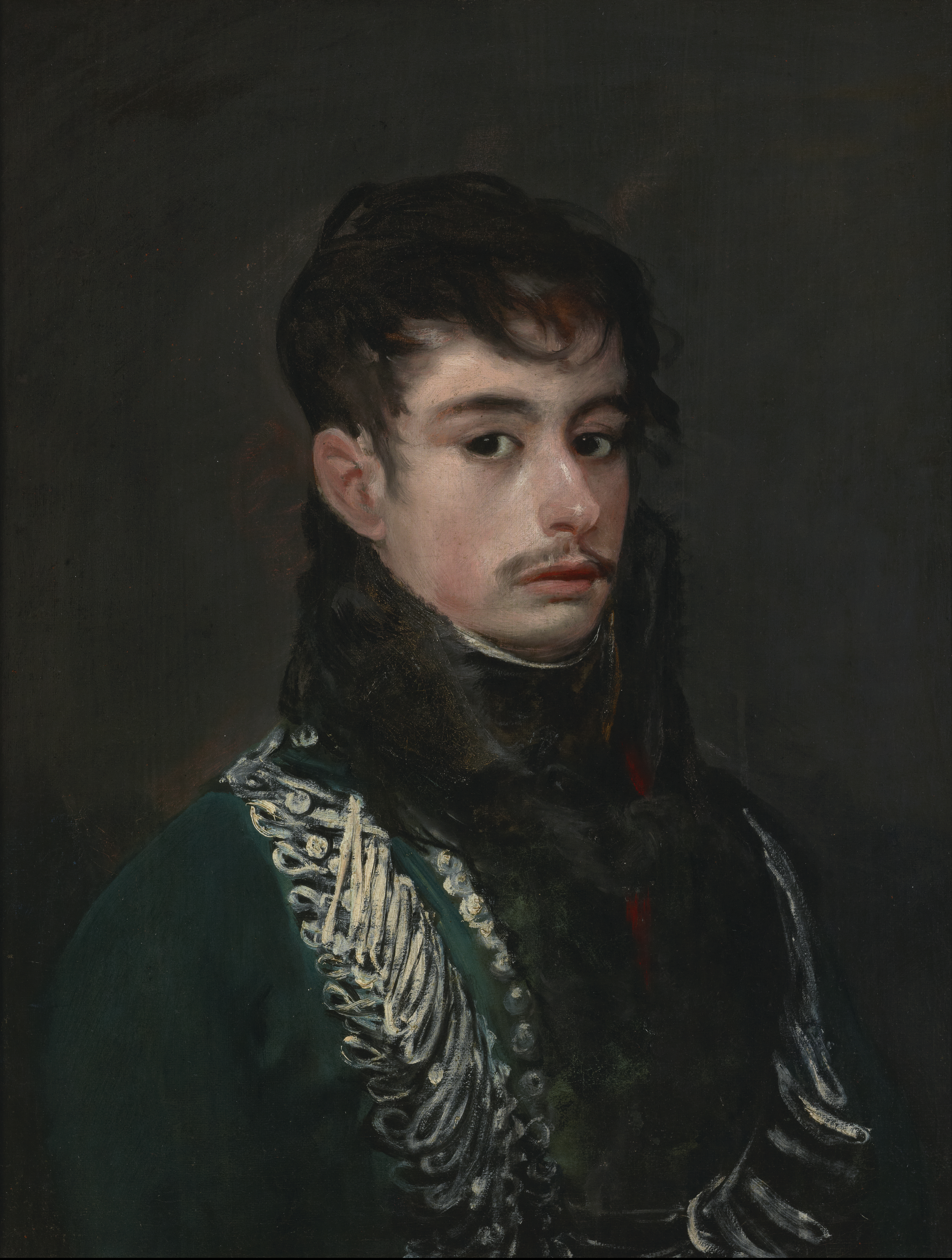
Portrait of the 17th Count of Teba by Goya, c. 1804

- Diego Ramírez de Guzmán y Ponce de León, 1st Count of Teba (b. 1450)
- Luis de Guzmán y Córdoba, 2nd Count of Teba (b. 1475), son of the 1st Count
- Juan Ramírez de Guzmán y Álvarez de Toledo, 3rd Count of Teba (b. 1510), son of the 2nd Count
- Brianda de Guzmán y de la Vega, 4th Countess of Teba (b. 1500), daughter of the 2nd Count
- Luis de Guzmán y Guzmán, 5th Count of Teba (b. 1530), son of the 4th Countess
- Pedro Andrés de Guzmán Enríquez de Rivera y Acuña, 6th Count of Teba (b. 1580), son of the 5th Count
- Luis Francisco Ramírez de Guzmán y Fernández de Córdoba, 7th Count of Teba (b. 1620), son of the 6th Count
- Pedro de Guzmán y Portocarrero, 8th Count of Teba (d. 1681), son of the 7th Count
- Agustín de Guzmán y Portocarrero, 9th Count of Teba (d. 1681), brother of the 8th Count
- Inés de Guzmán y Fernández de Córdoba, 10th Countess of Teba (1615-1681), daughter of the 5th Count
- Cristóbal Portocarrero de Guzmán Henriquez de Luna, 11th Count of Teba (1638-1704), son of the 10th Countess
- Catalina Portocarrero de Guzmán, 12th Countess of Teba (1660-1712), granddaughter of the 9th Count
- Domingo Fernández de Córdoba, 13th Count of Teba (d. 1736), son of the 12th Countess
- María del Carmen Fernández de Córdoba, 14th Countess of Teba (b. 1725), daughter of the 13th Count
- Luis Fernández de Córdoba y Portocarrero, 15th Count of Teba (1696-1771), son of the 12th Countess, Archbishop of Toledo
- María Francisca de Sales Portocarrero de Guzmán y Zúñiga, 16th Countess of Teba (1754-1808), grand-daughter of the 14th Countess
- Eugenio de Palafox y Portocarrero, 17th Count of Teba (1773-1834), son of the 16th Countess
- Cipriano de Palafox y Portocarrero, 18th Count of Teba (1784-1839), brother of the 17th Count
- María Eugenia de Palafox y Kirkpatrick, 19th Countess of Teba, (1826-1920), daughter of the 18th Count
- Eugenia María Fitz-James Stuart y Falcó, 20th Countess of Teba (1880-1962), great-granddaughter of the 17th Count
- Carlos Alfonso de Mitjans y Fitz-James Stuart, 21st Count of Teba (1907-1997), son of the 20th Countess
- Macarena de Mitjans y Verea, 22nd Countess of Teba (1936-2020), daughter of the 21st Count
- Jaime Patiño y Mitjans, 23rd Count of Teba (b. 1960), son of the 22nd Countess

== See also ==
- House of Guzmán

== Bibliography ==
- Joly de Dermenson, Paula (1971). de Cadenas y Vicent, Vicente (ed.). "La Accesión de D. Eugenio Eulalia Guzmán Palafox Portocarrero al Condado de Teba (1778)". Hidalguía. 19 (106). Instituto Salazar y Castro: 315–320.
- Hidalgos de España, Real Asociación de (2018). Elenco de Grandezas y Títulos Nobiliarios Españoles. Ediciones Hidalguía. ISBN 978-84-94841-02-6.
