= Luis II Fernandez de Cordoba =

Spanish Cardinal and noble

His Eminence Luis Antonio Fernández de Córdoba Portocarrero
- Cardinal, Archbishop of Toledo
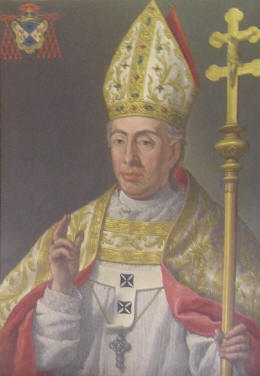
- Church: Roman Catholic Church
- Archdiocese: Toledo
- Appointed: 18 December 1754
- Term ended: 26 March 1771
- Predecessor: Luis Antonio de Borbón y Farnesio
- Successor: Francisco Antonio de Lorenzana

Orders
- Consecration: 28 September 1755 by Manuel Quintano Bonifaz
- Created cardinal: 18 December 1754 by Pope Benedict XIV

Personal details
- Born: 22 January 1696 Montilla, Córdoba,
- Died: 26 March 1771 (aged 75) Toledo, Spain
- Coat of arms

Luis Antonio Fernández de Córdoba Portocarrero Guzmán y Aguilar (Montilla, Córdoba, 22 January 1696 - Toledo, 26 March 1771) was a Spanish Cardinal and noble, from the House of Medinaceli.

== Biography ==
He was the second son of Catalina Portocarrero de Guzmán, XII Countess of Teba, and her husband Antonio Fernández de Córdoba Figueroa. He was related to Luis Manuel Fernández de Portocarrero, Archbishop of Toledo (1635-1709).

He studied at the Colegio Mayor de Cuenca, part of the University of Salamanca, and later at the University of Alcalá, where he obtained a doctorate in law. There is no record of his priestly ordination, but on 20 November 1717 he was named canon of the Toledo Cathedral, where he was dean from 7 March 1733.

At the proposal of King Ferdinand VI of Spain, he was named Cardinal in the consistory of 18 December 1754 by Pope Benedict XIV. The next year, on 3 August 3 1755, he was appointed Archbishop of the Archdiocese of Toledo to replace Luis Antonio de Borbón y Farnesio after the latter's resignation. He was unable to participate in the election of Pope Clement XIII in the 1758 papal conclave, but he did participate in the election of Pope Clement XIV in the 1769 papal conclave.

He opposed the expulsion of the Jesuits, and was therefore temporarily banned from the city of Madrid (then part of the archdiocese of Toledo).

After the death of his brother Domingo and his niece María del Carmen, he also became XV Count of Teba, XIII Marquess of Ardales and Lord of Campillo from 1738 until his death in 1771.

He is buried in the Convento de la Purísima Concepción, Toledo, which he restored.

== Sources ==
- Catholic Hierarchy
- Real Academia de la Historia
- The Cardinals of the Holy Roman Church

Catholic Church titles
Preceded by Luis Antonio de Borbón y Farnesio	Archbishop of Toledo; 1755–1771	Succeeded by Francisco Antonio de Lorenzana
