= Jesús Aguirre =

Spanish intellectual, Jesuit priest, literary editor and aristocrat

The Most Excellent Jesús Aguirre
- Duke of Alba (more...)
- Born: Jesús Aguirre y Ortiz de Zárate; 9 June 1934; Madrid, Spain
- Died: 11 May 2001 (aged 66); Madrid, Spain
- Noble family: House of Alba (by marriage)
- Spouse: Cayetana Fitz-James Stuart, 18th Duchess of Alba
- Father: Unknown
- Mother: María del Carmen Aguirre y Ortiz de Zárate

Seat f of the Real Academia Española
- In office 11 December 1986 – 11 May 2001
- Preceded by: Manuel de Terán
- Succeeded by: Luis Ángel Rojo

Ecclesiastical career
- Religion: Christianity
- Church: Catholic Church
- Ordained: c. 1960
- Laicized: 1977
- Congregations served: Chaplain of the City University of Madrid

Jesús Aguirre y Ortiz de Zárate, Duke consort of Alba (9 June 1934 – 11 May 2001) was a Spanish intellectual and government official, also a former Catholic priest (but not of Jesuit Order). He was a literary editor, and aristocrat minded. After leaving the priesthood, he became the literary editorial director of Taurus Publishing and later held the position of Director General of Music in the Spanish Ministry of Culture from 1977 to 1980. He was married to Cayetana Fitz-James Stuart, 18th Duchess of Alba and head of the House of Alba. In 1986, he went on to occupy Chair "F" of the Royal Spanish Academy, replacing Manuel de Terán Álvarez.

== Early life and priesthood ==
Jesús Aguirre was born out of wedlock on 9 June 1934 in Madrid, Spain, to María del Carmen Aguirre y Ortiz de Zárate. He spent most of his childhood in Santander, where he was educated by the Brothers of the Christian Schools.

After completing his secondary education with honors, Aguirre began his priestly studies at Comillas Pontifical University in Madrid, run by the Society of Jesus, graduating with a degree in philosophy. He then started his theological studies but was expelled from the seminary for his political views. Thus in 1956 he went to Munich, Germany, to study theology under Gottlieb Söhngen, at the same time that the future Pope Benedict XVI was a student there. It was in Munich that he first made contact with the proponents of Critical Theory and was a speaker at the first meetings between Marxists and Christians.

In 1958, during a vacation back in Spain, he joined the newly-founded Spanish Popular Liberation Front. After his ordination in Germany, he returned to Spain. In 1962 he served as a chaplain to the students of the City University of Madrid. In 1969 he published a collection of his homilies, Sermones en España (Sermons in Spain). It was initially banned in Francoist Spain. The ban was lifted in 1971, a year and a half later.

During his time as a priest, he worked for Taurus Publishing House, first as a translator and editor of religious publications, eventually becoming editor-in-chief, becoming a personal friend of many Spanish writers and politicians. As editor in chief, he was largely responsible for the translation and/or edition of a significant number of the works of the Frankfurt School.

== Secular life and marriage ==
During his time at Taurus, Aguirre met Cayetana Fitz-James Stuart, 18th Duchess of Alba, and decided to leave the priesthood to be able to marry her. The cabinet of Spain subsequently appointed him Director General of music at the Ministry of Culture, where he served from 8 September 1977 to 25 January 1980. On 16 March 1978 he married Cayetana Fitz-James, Duchess of Alba, whom he had met four months before. In 1981, he was elected president of the board of directors of Zoilo Ruiz-Mateos SA and he also became the director of the Bank Atlantic. Both organizations belonged to the business group Rumasa. These were positions he held until 1983, when he was elected to be a member of the Royal Academy of Fine Arts of San Fernando. In 1986 he became the Chair "F" of the Royal Spanish Academy. He was also elected to be Commissioner of the Universal Exposition of 1992 in Sevilla, and in December 1985 he became a member of the Real Academia Sevillana de Buenas Letras.

== Death ==
On 12 January 2001 Aguirre entered the clinic of la Luz (Madrid) due to a localized laryngeal cancer. At 17:15 on 11 May he died from a pulmonary embolism in the Palace of Liria. He was buried in the family vault of the House of Alba in the Monastery of the Immaculate Conception at Loeches. The funeral was conducted by the parish priest of the village.

== Awards and distinctions ==
- Grand Cross of the Civil Order of Alfonso X, the Wise.
- Grand Cross of the German Civil Merit.
- First gold medal Manuel de Falla.
- Honorary mayor of San Antonio, Texas, United States.
- Knight of the Sovereign Military Order of Malta.
- President of the National Association of Newspaper Libraries.
- Vice-patron of the Royal Association of British Hispanic United World Colleges.
- Fellow of the International Institute for Prehistoric Research (Chicago, United States).
- Member of the European Association of Culture (Venice, Italy).

== Published works by Jesús Aguirre ==
- Sermones en España (1971)
- Casi ayer noche (1985)
- Altas opportunidades (1987)
- Memorias del cumplimiento (1988)
- Las horas situadas (1989)
- Crónica en la comisaría (1992)

== Published works about Jesús Aguirre ==
- Caballero Rodríguez, Beatriz. 2013. Against Instrumental Reason: Neo-Marxism and Spirituality in the Thought of J.L.L. Aranguren and J. Aguirre. Anagnórisis.
- Vicent, Manuel. 2011. Aguirre, el magnífico. Madrid: Alfaguara.
