= Junta de Damas de Honor y Mérito =

Royal Spanish philanthropic organization

Junta de Damas de Honor y Mérito is a royal Spanish philanthropic organization, founded 27 August 1787 by king Charles III of Spain and was inaugurated on 5 October of that same year. Spain's first secular civic association for women, it was the female branch of the all male equivalent society Real Sociedad Económica Matritense de Amigos del País (Madrid Royal Economic Society of Friends of the Country), which had been founded in 1775 and was a prestigious society of the Spanish Age of Enlightenment. In the early days of the Junta de Damas, members met every Friday in the meeting room of the Casas Consistoriales (Town Hall) to discuss and report on various projects.

The association was created after the honorary admission of María Isidra Quintana de Guzmán y de la Cerda and María Josefa Alfonso Pimentel y Tellez-Girón to the Real Sociedad Económica Matritense. After a public debate over the admittance of women, the Junta de Damas was created to be a separate section of the society to provide a public space for women during the Enlightenment period. Notable public figures, such as Gaspar Melchor de Jovellanos, Francisco de Cabarrús, and Josefa Amar y Borbón, participated in the public discourse. One of the most notable essays to come from these debates was Discurso en defensa del talento de las mujeres, y de su aptitud para el gobierno, y otros cargos en que se emplean los hombres, penned by Amar y Borbón to defend the inclusion of women in intellectual circles.

The society supported and inspected several schools and establishments for women and children. Their goal was to educate women in skills appropriate to their class, so that all levels of society could participate in the improvement of the nation. Their push to increase women's participation in the production of domestic goods led to the formation of many of the programs that later became a large part of their legacy.

The motto of the Sociedad Económica Matritense was Socorre enseñando (Help by teaching) which the Junta de Damas followed through their various projects.

The Junta de Damas was granted its own legal entity by Royal Order on 30 July 1920, in order to conduct its business.

== Philanthropic Work ==
=== Escuelas Patrióticas ===
Their first task consisted of supervising the Escuelas Patrióticas (Patriotic Schools), originally founded by the Real Sociedad Económica Matritense de Amigos del País. These included four schools in Madrid (San Andrés, San Ginés, San Martín, and San Sebastián) that were mainly focused on the education of women in skills "appropriate to their sex" such as needlework. When the Junta de Damas overtook the project in 1787, the schools were in poor condition. However, their state was improved greatly through the effort of the Junta. The Escuelas focused mainly on skills related to textiles and other artisanal works, which were believed to be key in the improvement of the Spanish economy. The Junta de Damas also took charge of other professional training schools such as the Escuela de Bordados (The School of Embroidery) and the Escuela de Flores Artificiales (The School of Artificial Flowers).

As part of their efforts to foster continuous improvement in the skills of their students, the Junta de Damas offered several awards, including cash prizes and certificates of completion of their training programs, to their highest achieving students. Evidence shows that the certificates were likely significant to the career success of graduates, suggestive of the authority that the Junta de Damas had gained in textiles and education.

=== Women's Prisons ===
The Junta de Damas founded the Instituto Piadoso de Ayuda a las Presas (Pious Institute of Aid for Imprisoned Women) in June 1788, led by Junta member, the Condesa de Montijo. The institute was composed entirely of members of the Junta de Damas. They primarily focused on La Galera, a female prison known for its poor conditions and lengthy incarcerations. Female prisoners were provided educational and moral resources, taught skills such as weaving and embroidery, and some even learned to read and write through religious texts provided by the institute.

The Institute provided better clothing, bedding, and medicine to prisoners and their children. Moreover, the Institute helped to liberate some of the prisoners and cover the cost of transportation back to their hometowns. King Charles III approved their progress that he approved their request to construct a maternity ward within the prison.

=== Real Inclusa de Madrid ===
The Inclusa was initially created in 1567 to address the need of housing for the elderly. In 1572, housing was opened for abandoned newborns, thus causing the shelter to become the Foundling Hospital. Much later, in 1792, the Junta de Damas became aware of the conditions of the hospital and sent a plea to the King, asking to take charge of the hospital. It wasn't until 1799, after much petitioning, that the King finally granted them control. The conditions there were poor, with the infant mortality rate being around 90%. This was due to a lack of resources, poor hygienic conditions, and a lack of experienced staff. The Junta de Damas worked to reform the Inclusa by disinfecting it thoroughly, setting up new medical services with strict hygiene regimens, and hiring qualified staff to assist in its management. These new precautions caused the infant mortality rate to drop from 96 to 46 percent in the early 1800s.

== Leadership ==
=== Founders ===
There were sixteen founding members. Notable founding members included: María Isidra Quintana de Guzmán y de la Cerda; María Josefa Alfonso Pimentel y Téllez-Girón, fifteenth Countess-Duchess of Benavente and ninth Duchess of Osuna; and Josefa Amar y Borbón.

=== Officer Positions ===
During the early years of the society the role of president was held alternatingly by the Duchess of Osuna and the countess of Torrepalma-Trullás by means of elections. The Countess of Montijo was elected secretary in 1757 and served the role for almost 18 years. Due to the demanding workload of the job of secretary, Maria del Rosario Cepeda was elected secondary secretary the same year. Meetings were democratic: members made decisions through discussion and voting.
