= Count of Montijo =

Hereditary title in the peerage of Spain

Countship of Montijo
- Creation date: 13 December 1599
- Created by: Philip III
- Peerage: Peerage of Spain
- First holder: Juan Portocarrero y Manuel de Villena, 1st Count of Montijo
- Present holder: Jacobo Hernando Fitz-James Stuart y Gómez, 13th Count of Montijo

Count of Montijo (Spanish: Conde de Montijo) is a hereditary title in the Peerage of Spain accompanied by the dignity of Grandee, granted in 1599 by Philip III to Juan Portocarrero, Lord of Montijo, mayordomo mayor and a knight of the Order of Santiago.

== Counts of Montijo (1599) ==
1. Juan Portocarrero y Manuel de Villena, 1st Count of Montijo
2. Cristóbal Portocarrero y Manuel de Villena, 2nd Count of Montijo
3. Cristóbal Portocarrero y Luna, 3rd Count of Montijo
4. Cristóbal Portocarrero de Guzmán y Luna, 4th Count of Montijo
5. Cristóbal Gregorio Portocarrero, 5th Count of Montijo
6. María Francisca de Sales Portocarrero de Guzmán y Zúñiga, 6th Countess of Montijo
7. Eugenio Eulalio Palafox y Portocarrero, 7th Count of Montijo
8. Cipriano Palafox y Portocarrero, 8th Count of Montijo
9. María Francisca de Sales Portocarrero y Kirkpatrick, 9th Countess of Montijo
10. Carlos María Fitz-James Stuart y Portocarrero, 10th Count of Montijo
11. Hernando Fitz-James Stuart, 11th Count of Montijo
12. Fernando Alfonso Fitz-James Stuart, 12th Count of Montijo
13. Jacobo Hernando Fitz-James Stuart, 13th Count of Montijo

== Family tree ==
Cristóbal Osorio Portocarrero, 2nd Lord of Montijo; 1502–1571
Juan Portocarrero, 1st Count of Montijo c. 1540–1606	Cristóbal Portocarrero, 2nd Count of Montijo; 1560–1616
Cristóbal Portocarrero, 3rd Count of Montijo; 1598–1658
Cristóbal Portocarrero, 3rd Marquess of Valderrábano; 1617–1641
Cristóbal Portocarrero, 4th Count of Montijo; 1638–1704
Cristóbal Gregorio Portocarrero, 5th Count of Montijo; 1693–1763
Cristóbal Pedro Portocarrero, 6th Marquess of Valderrábano; 1728–1757
María Francisca de Sales Portocarrero, 6th Countess of Montijo; 1754–1808
Eugenio Palafox, 7th Count of Montijo; 1773–1834	Cipriano de Palafox, 8th Count of Montijo; 1784–1839
María Francisca de Sales Portocarrero, 9th Countess of Montijo; 1825–1860
Carlos María Fitz-James Stuart, 10th Count of Montijo; 1849–1901
Hernando Fitz-James Stuart, 11th Count of Montijo; 1882–1936
Fernando Alfonso Fitz-James Stuart, 12th Count of Montijo; 1922–1970
Jacobo Hernando Fitz-James Stuart, 13th Count of Montijo; 1947

== See also ==
- List of current grandees of Spain
