= Duke of Peñaranda de Duero =

Dukedom of Spain

Dukedom of Peñaranda de Duero
- Creation date: 22 May 1608
- Created by: Philip III
- Peerage: Peerage of Spain
- First holder: Juan de Zúñiga y Bazán, 1st Duke of Peñaranda
- Present holder: Jacobo Hernando Fitz-James Stuart y Gómez, 20th Duke of Peñaranda

Duke of Peñaranda de Duero (Spanish: Duque de Peñaranda de Duero), commonly known as Duke of Peñaranda, is a title of Spanish nobility that is accompanied by the dignity of Grandee of Spain. It was granted to Juan de Zúñiga y Bazán on 22 May 1608 by king Philip III. Juan de Zúñiga was Viceroy of Catalonia and Viceroy of Naples. The title's name refers to the municipality of Peñaranda de Duero in the Province of Burgos, Spain.

== Dukes of Peñaranda de Duero (1608) ==
- Juan de Zúñiga y Bazán, 1st Duke of Peñaranda
- Diego de Zúñiga y Pacheco, 2nd Duke of Peñaranda
- Francisco de Zúñiga y Sandoval, 3rd Duke of Peñaranda
- Diego de Zúñiga y Enríquez de Acevedo, 4th Duke of Peñaranda
- Fernando de Zúñiga y Enríquez de Acevedo, 5th Duke of Peñaranda
- Isidro de Zúñiga y Enríquez de Acevedo, 6th Duke of Peñaranda
- Isidro de Zúñiga y Valdés, 7th Duke of Peñaranda
- Ana María de Zúñiga y Enríquez de Acevedo, 8th Duchess of Peñaranda
- Joaquín José de Chaves y Zúñiga, 9th Duke of Peñaranda
- Pedro Regalado de Zúñiga y Girón, 10th Duke of Peñaranda
- Antonio de Zúñiga y Ayala, 11th Duke of Peñaranda
- Pedro de Alcántara de Zúñiga y Girón, 12th Duke of Peñaranda
- María del Carmen Josefa de Zúñiga y Fernández de Velasco, 13th Duchess of Peñaranda
- Eugenio de Palafox y Portocarrero, 14th Duke of Peñaranda
- Cipriano Palafox y Portocarrero, 15th Duke of Peñaranda
- Maria Francisca de Sales Palafox y Kirkpatrick, 16th Duchess of Peñaranda
- Carlos María Fitz-James Stuart y Palafox, 17th Duke of Peñaranda
- Hernando Fitz-James Stuart y Falcó, 18th Duke of Peñaranda
- Fernando Fitz-James Stuart y Saavedra, 19th Duke of Peñaranda
- Jacobo Hernando Fitz-James Stuart y Gómez, 20th Duke of Peñaranda

== See also ==
- List of dukes in the peerage of Spain
- List of current grandees of Spain
