= Hernando Fitz-James Stuart, 18th Duke of Peñaranda =

Spanish nobleman and equestrian

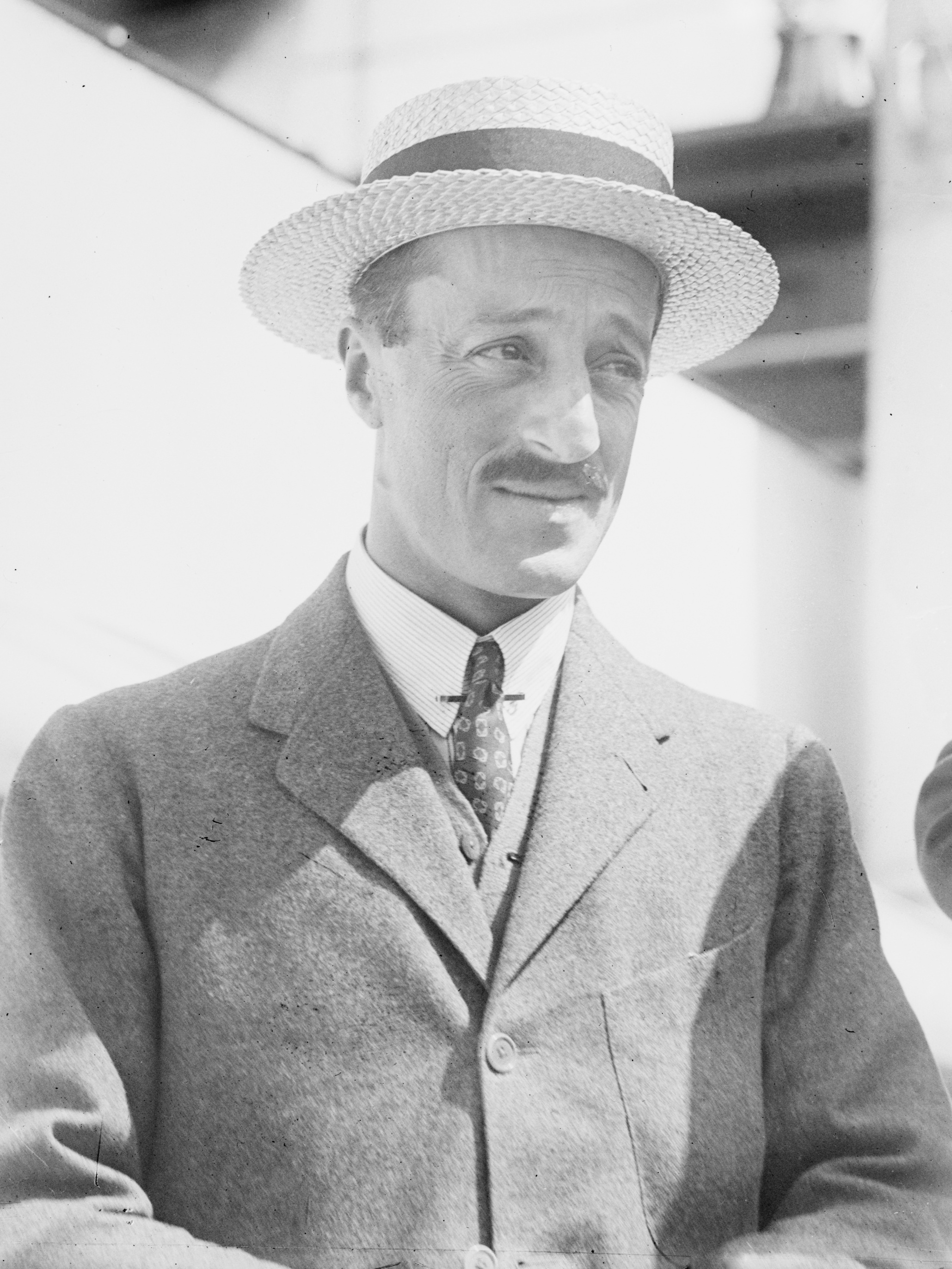
The Duke of Peñaranda in 1914

Hernando Carlos María Teresa Fitz-James Stuart y Falcó, 18th Duke of Peñaranda de Duero, GE (3 November 1882 – 7 November 1936), was a Spanish nobleman. Through him, the English (Jacobite) Dukes of Berwick continue their line.

== Biography ==
He was born in Madrid, the younger son of the 16th Duke of Alba and his wife, María del Rosario Falcó, 21st Countess of Siruela. On his father's death on 13 October 1901, he became the 18th Duke of Peñaranda (and a grandee of Spain), 13th Marquess of Valderrabano and 11th Count of Montijo (also with the Grandeeship attached). His elder brother Jacobo inherited the majority of the family titles, including the Dukedom of Alba.

The Duke of Peñaranda was a Gentilhombre Grande España (Gentleman Grandee of Spain of the Royal Household) to King Alfonso XIII of Spain. At the 1920 Summer Olympics he and his brother were on the Spanish polo team, winning the silver medal.

On 20 December 1920, the Duke was married to María del Carmen de Saavedra y Collado, 13th Marchioness of Villaviciosa (daughter of José de Saavedra y Salamanca, 2nd Marquess of Viana, Grandee of Spain), and they had one son: Fernando Alfonso Fitz-James Stuart y Saavedra, born 24 January 1922 and died 20 July 1970.

The Duke of Peñaranda died in the massacre of Paracuellos in November 1936, during the Spanish Civil War, and was succeeded in his titles by his only son. The Duchess died on 23 April 1967.

Spanish nobility
Preceded by Carlos María Fitz-James Stuart	Duke of Peñaranda; 1902-1936	Succeeded by Fernando Fitz-James Stuart y Saavedra
