= Loeches =

Coordinates: 40°23′N 3°24′W

- Municipality
- Coat of arms

- Municipal location within the Community of Madrid.
- Country: Spain
- Autonomous community: Community of Madrid
- Elevation: 2,123 ft (647 m)

Population (2025-01-01)
  - Total: 9,261
- Time zone: UTC+1 (CET)
  - Summer (DST): UTC+2 (CEST)
- Postal code: 28890

Loeches is a municipality of the Community of Madrid, Spain.
