= Eugenio Palafox Portocarrero =

Spanish army officer (1773–1834)

Eugenio Palafox Portocarrero, Conde de Montijo
- Born: 12 November 1773; Madrid
- Died: 18 July 1834 (aged 60); Madrid
- Military career
- Conflicts: Peninsular War; Battle of Valencia; Battle of Uclés; Battle of Saguntum; Battle of Castalla

Eugenio Eulalio Palafox y Portocarrero (Note: His name appears variously with the order of the surnames changed: Eugenio Palafox Portocarrero (birth certificate) or Eugenio Portocarrero Palafox (death certificate). He also signed documents as Eugenio de Guzmán. (Cassinello Pérez.)) (1773–1834), 7th Count of Montijo (Note: Charles Oman, throughout his A History of the Peninsular War, refers to him as Conde de Montijo.) and 17th Count of Teba, was a Spanish military officer during the Peninsular War.

== Early career ==
He was the eldest son of Felipe Palafox y Croy de Habré, a captain in the Walloon Guards, and María de Sales Portocarreño y Zúñiga, 6th Countess of Montijo.
Elected honorary academician of the Real Academia de la Historia in 1794, he was prevented from reading his inaugural speech, which proposed presenting the nobility as a moderating power on the absolutist monarchs, when Godoy got wind of it. Having initially been banished to Toledo, he finally ended up in Granada, where he joined that city's Regiment of Provincial Militias as a lieutenant colonel.

== Peninsular War ==
=== 1807 ===
Attached to the 1st Division of the Provincial Grenadiers at Cádiz, Montijo formed part of the auxiliary Spanish corps that aided General Junot's Army of the Gironde in invading Portugal.

=== 1808 ===
In April 1808 Montijo was promoted to colonel and transferred to the Provincial Regiment of Cuenca.

Towards the end of June, he saw action at the Battle of Valencia (26 June). He then headed off, at the head of a brigade, to relieve Zaragoza, accompanied by Saint-Marcq's Walloon Guards.

On 15 August he was promoted to brigadier.

On 27 August, following José Palafox's instructions to push as far up the Ebro as he could, Montijo, at the head of a column of the Army of Aragón reached the bridge at Alfaro, almost opposite the left flank of the French forces at Milagro. When attacked there by Lefebvre-Desnouettes's cavalry, the Spanish column retreated to Tudela, where Marshal Moncey met them with an infantry division. Again, Montijo retreated. Thinking that these skirmishes must be mere diversions, and under the impression that the attack would be coming from that side, King Joseph moved his reserves up the river to Miranda. Montijo, however, had given way because his troops were raw levies, and because his nearest support was Saragossa.

Montijo returned to Madrid towards the end of September and tried to form a government of relevant aristocrats but met with the opposition of the Duke of Infantado. Together with the Marquis of Coupigny and Francisco Palafox, as members of the Junta Militar commissioned by the Junta Central to oversee military matters, they were especially preoccupied with Castaños' movements on the Ebro.

At the end of October, Montijo was a member of the deputation from the Supreme Junta, consisting of Francisco Palafox and Coupigny, that was sent to put pressure on Castaños for not yet having attacked the French. José Palafox joined them from Saragossa. By the beginning of November, "after a long and stormy meeting", it was decided to resume offensive operations. (Note: The idea was a mad one, for six days before the council of war was held two French army corps, those of Victor and Lefebvre, had crossed the Bidassoa and entered Spain. There were now 110,000 instead of 65,000 enemies in front of the Spanish armies. Moreover, and this was still more important, Napoleon himself had reached Bayonne on November 3. (Oman, 1902: pp. 395.))

=== 1809 ===
In February, Montijo fought at Uclés (13 February).

In mid-April, Montijo was almost successful in carrying out a pronunciamiento in Granada, supported by Infantado and Francisco Palafox, and for which the Junta banished him to San Lucar.

Montijo, together with members of the old Junta of Seville, Francisco Palafox, and the Dukes of Infantado and Osuna, was one of the conspirators planning to overthrow the Central Junta, deport them all to the Canaries, and proclaim a Regency. That September, they approached Wellesley, British Ambassador to Spain (and Wellington's younger brother), to request his aid, which he refused. Wellesley immediately reported the plot, without revealing any names, to Martín de Garay, secretary to the Junta. (Note: In his letter to his brother, Wellesley wrote: For the last two days, I have been employed in endeavouring to save the necks of these caitiffs from the just fury and indignation of the people and soldiery, and I have succeeded. A regular plot was formed to seize (and I believe to hang) them all. But I could not suffer such outrages under my nose, so I interfered and saved the curs from the rope. (Oman, 1908: pp. 4–5.)) Montijo was imprisoned in Seville for participating in the plot.

=== 1810 ===
In January, Montijo and Palafox escaped from prison during a mutiny. Montijo joined the Army of Extremadura, but due to differences with the generals there, he returned to Cádiz in September and by the end of October was in Alicante, once again at the head of his Provincial Regiment of Cuenca.

=== 1811 ===
From June to September Montijo saw action in the Alpujarras, where he won several small skirmishes against General Godinot's troops, who had been tasked with controlling the area. In August he captured two Polish companies near Motril, and later checked a column of 1,500 men under Colonel Rémond.

He then went to Murcia to take up command of the 1st Division of the 3rd Army, with which he saw action at Saguntum and later tried to relieve Valencia.

=== 1812 ===
The new commander-in-chief of the 3rd Army, José O'Donnell, called him back to Alicante where, in July, Montijo saw action at Castalla (21 July).

In November he was promoted to field marshal.

== Post-war career ==
In June 1814 Montijo was appointed captain general of the Kingdom of Granada, and in August 1815 he was promoted to lieutenant general.

In August 1819, he was imprisoned in Santiago for his connections with the liberal revolutionaries. However, with Riego's uprising at the beginning of 1820 he was released the following February. At the end of March he was appointed captain general of Old Castille but dismissed at the end of April and confined to barracks at Murcia.

He died in 1834 without children and was succeeded by his younger brother Cipriano.
