= Cayetana de Alba =

Cayetana de Alba may refer to:

- María del Pilar Teresa Cayetana de Silva, 13th Duchess of Alba
- María del Rosario Cayetana Fitz-James Stuart, 18th Duchess of Alba
