= Elizabeth Baird =

Scottish dog breeder

Elizabeth Baird is a banned dog breeder in Scotland, who has in the past operated through Hillbank Kennels. In 2008 she entered pleas of not guilty to six charges of using a false description of dogs, and supplying animals with a similar description. The offences are alleged to have been committed between July and November 2007.

In 2008 she falsely claimed to a Scottish court that puppies she was selling were Kennel Club-registered, but the court found her guilty and issued her with a £2,000 fine.

Her husband, Thomas Baird, is a pastor at Assemblies of God Pentecostal Church at Johnstone, Renfrewshire, who in 2013 along with Elizabeth, was charged with illegally advertising Bichon Frise, Jack Russell, Malteschion and other puppies for sale and selling them at Ayr bus station, Sainsburys car park in Strathaven, and at their own cottage, as well as other locations. A warrant was issued for his arrest in 2013 after Sheriff John Montgomery agreed to a motion from Jim Kelman, the prosecutor.

In 2015, they featured in a BBC Scotland investigative report on illegal dog trafficking and animal cruelty.
