= Yoon-jung =

- Hangul: 윤정
- RR: Yunjeong
- MR: Yunjŏng

Yoon-jung, also spelled Yoon-jeong, Youn-jeong, or Yun-jeong, is a Korean given name.

People with this name include:

- Huh Yoon-jung (born 1936), South Korean male footballer
- Lily Lyoonjung Lee (born 1969), South Korean-born American female figure skater
- Cho Youn-jeong (born 1969), South Korean female archer
- Cho Yoon-jeong (born 1979), South Korean female tennis player
- Jang Yoon-jeong (singer) (born 1980), South Korean female trot singer
- Yoonjung Han (born 1985), South Korean-born American female pianist
- Jang Yoon-jeong (Miss Korea) (born 1987), South Korean female model
- Marissa Brandt (born Park Yoon-jung, 1992), South Korean-born American female ice hockey player
- Jin Se-yeon (born Kim Yoon-jung, 1994), South Korean female actress

Fictional characters with this name include:

- Yoon-jeong, female character in 2006–2007 South Korean television series Hearts of Nineteen
- Shin Yun-jeong, female protagonist of 2008 South Korean film Portrait of a Beauty
- Go Yoon-jung, female protagonist of 2016 South Korean television series Mrs. Cop 2

== See also ==
- List of Korean given names
