= The Duchess of Alba and la Beata =

1795 painting by Francisco de Goya

The Duchess of Alba and the "Beata"
- La Duquesa de Alba asustando a la beata (Spanish)
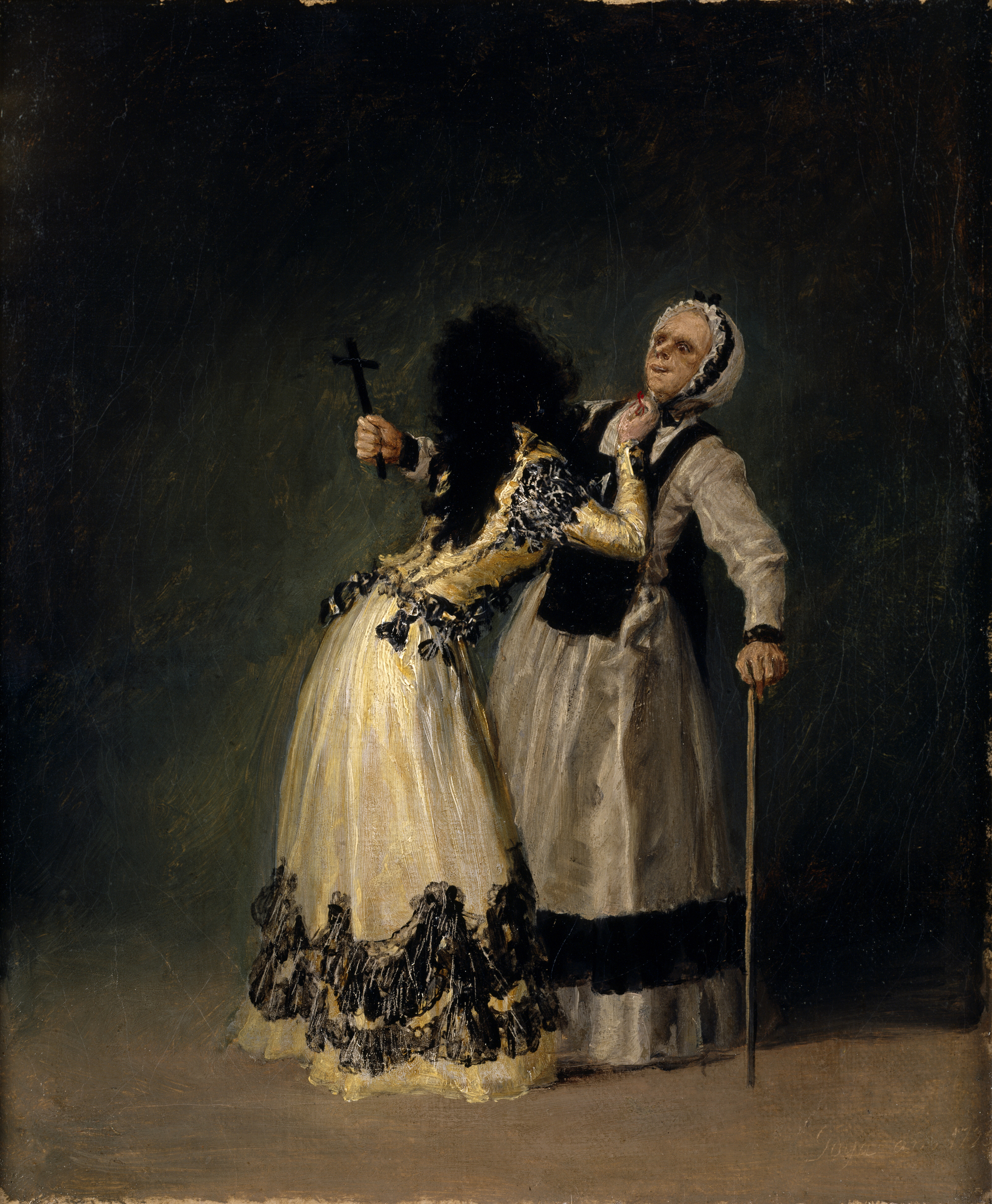
- Artist: Francisco Goya
- Year: 1795
- Medium: Oil on canvas
- Dimensions: 33 cm × 27.7 cm (13 in × 10.9 in)
- Location: Museo del Prado; Madrid

The Duchess of Alba and "la Beata" (or The Duchess of Alba and the Pious Woman; Spanish: La duquesa de Alba y su dueña o La Duquesa de Alba y "la Beata) is an oil-on-canvas painting by the Spanish artist Francisco Goya, from 1795.

It portrays the Duchess María Cayetana de Silva, 13th Duchess of Alba reaching playfully towards her maid (or duena) Rafaela Luisa Velazquez (known as "la Beata"), who leans away. María holds a red cord under the chin of the older woman, which seems to scare her as she recoils and leans backwards, her eyes rolled in mock horror, her mouth curled in delight. Velazquez props herself up with a walking stick or cane, and bears a wooden cross in her extended right hand, playfully banishing the Duchess. Both figures wear white dresses; the duchess with black lace and bodice. The painting is composed of mainly white and black hues applied in broad brush strokes, while the dresses are outlined in touches of livid yellow. The figures are set against a flat, black background which isolates the moment and removes any context.

The Duchess of Alba and la Beata is considered to form part of Goya's "caprichos", and was painted shortly after he fell deaf. It is signed "Goya in 1795" in the lower right corner. It is in the collection of the Museo del Prado, Madrid, having been acquired from a private collection. Goya portrayed María Cayetana de Silva a number of other times, notably The White Duchess of the same year and the 1797 Portrait of the Duchess of Alba.

== See also ==
- List of works by Francisco Goya

== Sources ==
- Connell, Evan S. Francisco Goya: A Life. New York: Counterpoint, 2004. ISBN 1-58243-307-0
- Forty, Sandra. Francisco De Goya. TAJ, 2014. ASIN B00USAESNM
- Hughes, Robert. Goya. New York: Alfred A. Knopf, 2004. ISBN 978-0-394-58028-9
- Morales y Marín, José Luis. Goya: a catalogue of his paintings. Real Academia de Nobles y Bellas Artes de San Luis, 1997
