= Bichon Frisé =

Dog breed

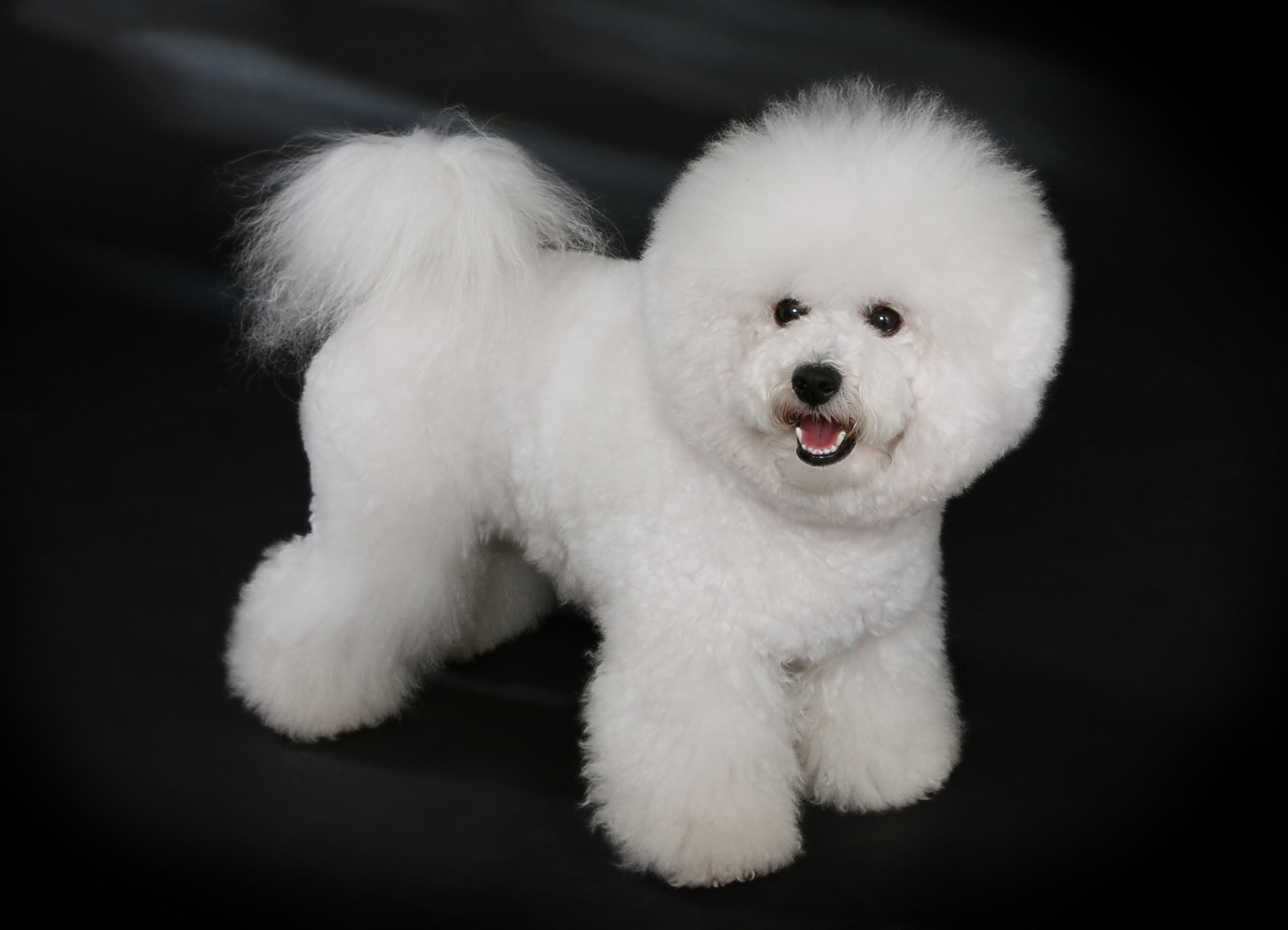
- Other names: Bichón Tenerife; Bichon à poil frisé
- Origin: Canary Islands (Spain); Belgium/France (later development)
Traits
Height	Males	25–30 cm (10–12 in)
	Females	23–29 cm (9–11 in)
- Coat: medium length, silky, texture with corkscrew curls
- Colour: white
Kennel club standards
- Société Royale Saint-Hubert: standard
- Société Centrale Canine: standard
- Fédération Cynologique Internationale: standard

The Bichon Frisé (Note: /ˈbiːʃɒn frɪˈzeɪ/; from French: bichon à poil frisé, French pronunciation: [biʃɔ̃ fʁize], meaning 'curly haired dog') or Bichon à Poil Frisé is a Franco-Belgian breed of small toy dog of bichon type. It was recognised by the Société Centrale Canine in 1933 and by the Fédération Cynologique Internationale in 1959.

== Etymology ==
The French word bichon comes from Middle French bichon ('small dog'), a diminutive of Old French biche ('female dog', cognate with English bitch), from Old English bicce, and related to other Germanic words with the same meaning, including Old Norse bikkja, and German Betze. Some speculate the origin of bichon to be the result of the apheresis, or shortening, of the word barbichon ('small poodle'), a derivative of barbiche ('shaggy dog'); however, this is likely impossible, since the word bichon (attested 1588) is older than barbichon (attested 1694). While the English name for the breed, Bichon Frise, is derived from the French bichon à poil frisé meaning 'curly haired small dog'.

== History ==
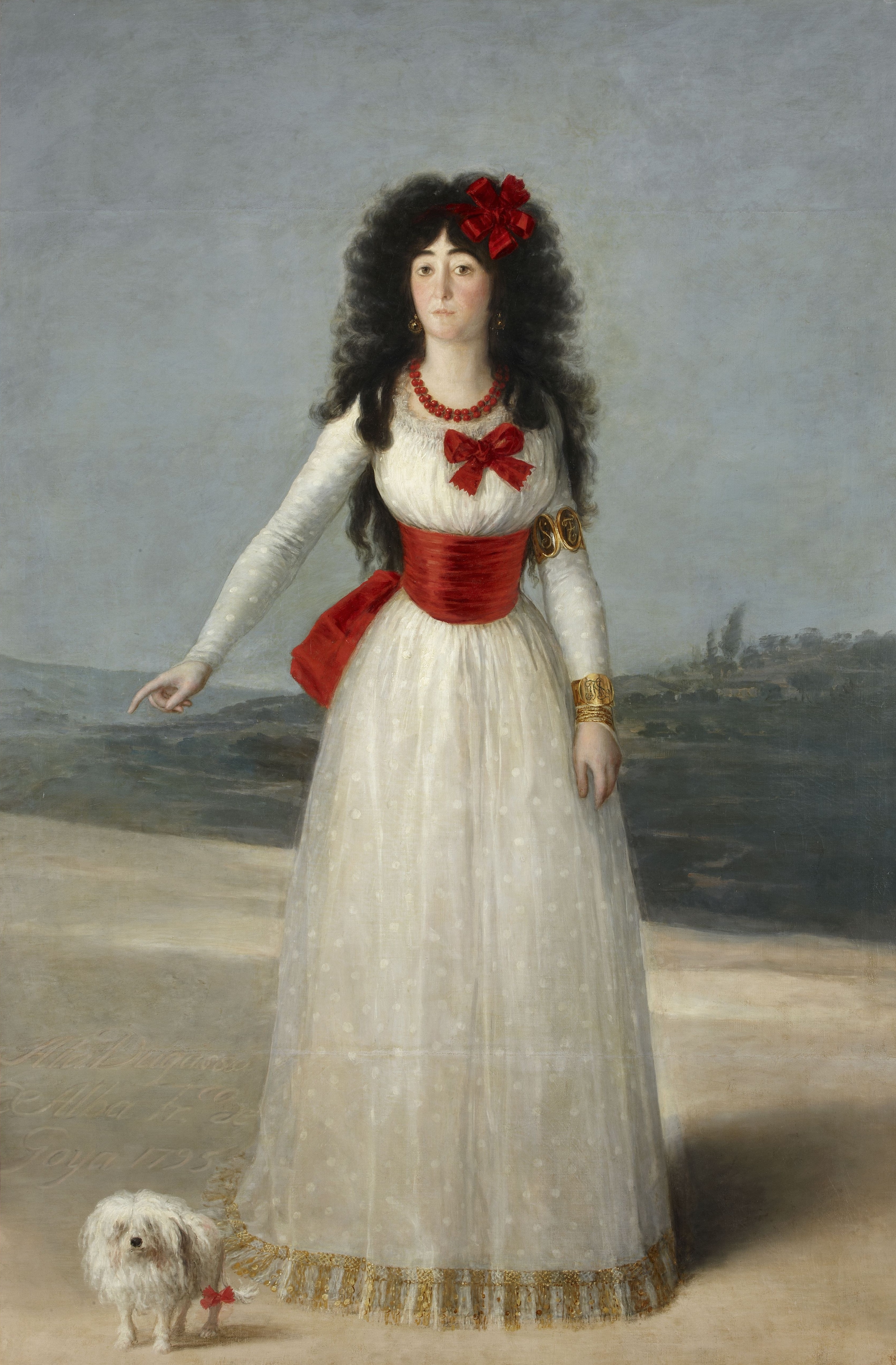
The White Duchess, painted by Francisco de Goya in 1795, featuring the Duchess of Alba and her Bichon

The dogs found early success in Spain and it is generally believed that Spanish seamen introduced the early breed to Tenerife in the Canary Islands. Their association with European nobility began in the 13th century, entering the royal courts of Spain, Italy and France. In the 14th century, Italian sailors rediscovered the dogs on their voyages and are credited with returning them to continental Europe.

The Bichon à Poil Frisé was recognised by the Société Centrale Canine in 1933. It was definitively accepted by the Fédération Cynologique Internationale in October 1959.

Some of the dogs were introduced to the United States in 1955 and to the United Kingdom in 1973.

== Appearance ==
The Bichon Frisé is a small dog, standing 23–30 cm (9–12 in) at the withers and weighing approximately 5 kg (11 lb), the weight varying in proportion to the height. The skull is rather flat, but may appear rounded; the muzzle tapers only slightly, and constitutes two-fifths of the length of the head. The nose is black, the eyes dark and round.

The coat is loosely curled in spirals or corkscrews, with a thick soft undercoat. On the Bichon Frisé's head, it is typically styled in a spherical shape, resembling a full moon. The coat is always pure white; only in dogs under a year old may it be slightly tinged with beige, this extending over no more than 10% of the area of the body. The head and legs are proportionate in size to the body.

== Health ==
A 2024 UK study found a life expectancy of 12.5 years for the breed compared to an average of 12.7 for purebreeds and 12 for crossbreeds.

An American study looking at immune-mediated hemolytic anemia found a predisposition to the condition in the Bichon Frise, with 9% of cases belonging to the breed despite being 2% of the control population.

A study in the UK found the Bichon Frise to be predisposed to gall bladder disease (excluding gall bladder mucocele). The Bichon Frise was found to be 9.26 times more likely to acquire a non-mucocele gall bladder disease than other dogs.

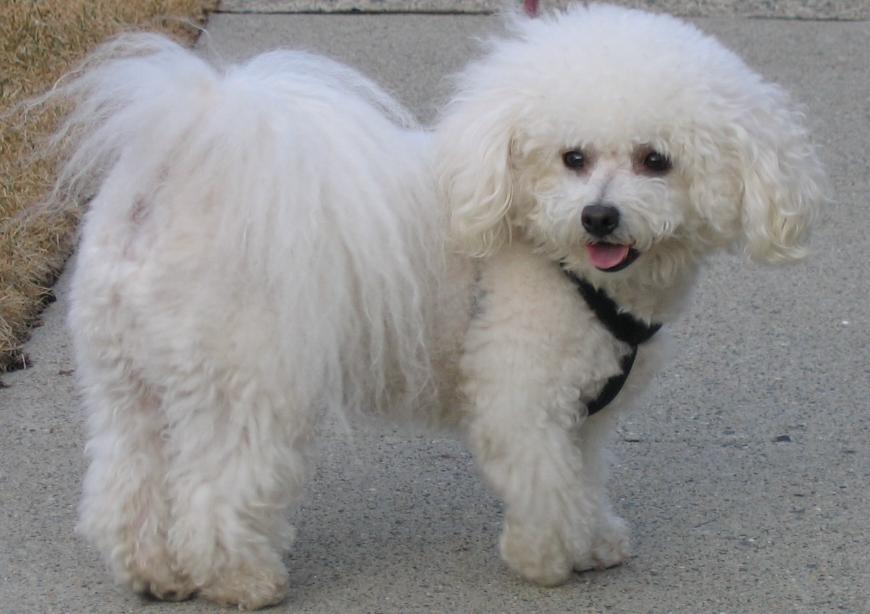
Pet trim

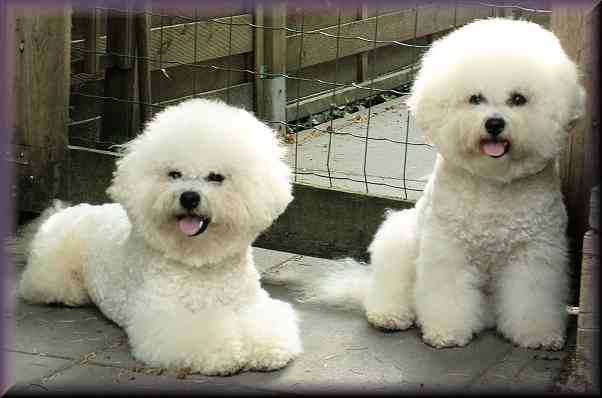
Show cut

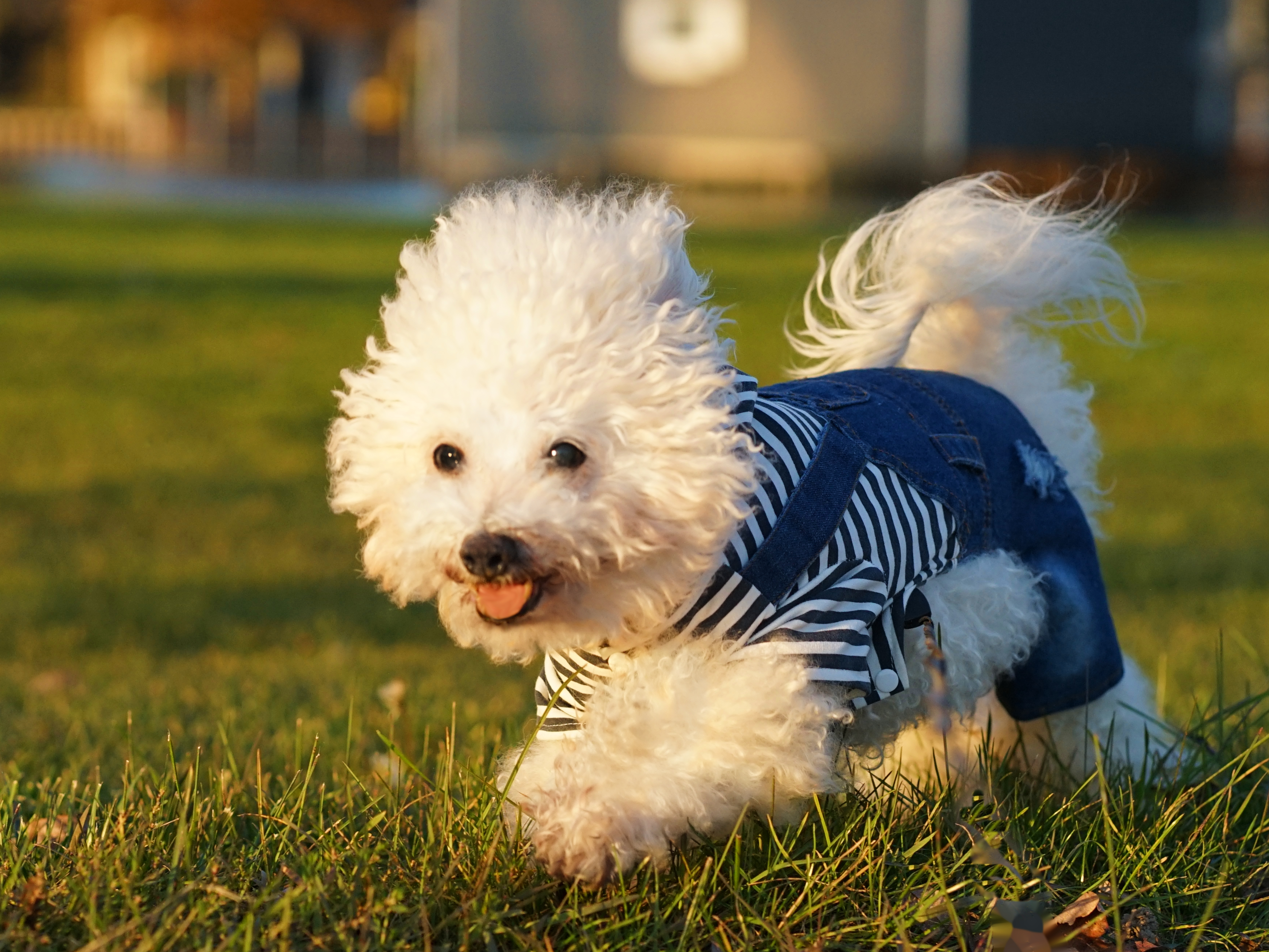
At sixteen years old
