= Adam Johnson (Canadian conductor) =

Canadian conductor

Adam Johnson is a Canadian classical conductor. He is currently music director of the Baton Rouge Symphony Orchestra and the Guelph Symphony Orchestra.

== Education ==
Johnson obtained a Bachelor of Music in piano performance at the University of Alberta in Edmonton, under the tutelage of Stéphane Lemelin and Jacques Després. He obtained a master's degree, an artist diploma under Jean Saulnier, and a doctoral degree under the direction of Jean Saulnier and Marc Durand at the Université de Montréal. He obtained a prize in orchestral conducting from the Conservatoire de musique du Québec à Montréal, where he studied under Raffi Armenian.

== Career ==
Johnson's professional conducting debut was as resident conductor of the Calgary Philharmonic Orchestra in Alberta. He later became assistant then resident conductor of the Montreal Symphony Orchestra in Quebec, assisting Kent Nagano, for three seasons. He was appointed music director of the Baton Rouge Symphony Orchestra and the Guelph Symphony Orchestra in 2023. He was appointed principal conductor of the Orchestre Symphonique de Laval in 2025, where he is now a guest conductor.

== Honours ==
Johnson was awarded the Jean-Marie Beaudet Award for orchestra conducting from the Canada Council in 2015 and an Opus Award from the Conseil québécois de la musique alongside the Montreal Symphony Orchestra in 2018.
