= Jean Saulnier =

Canadian pianist and music educator

Jean Saulnier is a Canadian pianist and music educator.

== Biography ==
Saulnier was educated as a musician at the Conservatoire de musique du Québec à Montréal and the Université de Montréal. He has studied piano with Marc Durand, Leon Fleisher, Karl-Heinz Kämmerling, André Laplante, György Sebők, and James Tocco. In 1984 he won the Lynell Gordon Memorial Prize at the University of Maryland International Piano Festival and Competition (now called the William Kapell Competition); later winning first prize at that competition in 1988. In 1986 he won the Prix d'Europe, and in 1987 he won the Leschetizky Competition in New York City. The latter competition win led to his recital debut at Carnegie Hall. Critic Bernard Holland wrote the following in his review in The New York Times:

"It is good to make Mr. Saulnier's acquaintance. He is a sound and interesting musician - good enough to have deserved a better program than the one he chose for Sunday. Beethoven's Sonata Opus 110 seemed almost too respectful, too marchlike in its careful symmetries. Yet the balancing of voices and the organization (notwithstanding a rather clumsy lurch into the final coda) spoke of an understanding if overly cautious interpreter. Mr. Saulnier does have the right kind of musical limberness when he chooses to use it. Indeed, Liszt's C sharp minor Hungarian Rhapsody was admirably uninhibited without ever sprawling. Mr. Saulnier's technique responded handsomely to Liszt's florid writing and worked just as confidently in Ned Rorem's Song and Dance - a brief, brightly colored and interesting piece contrasting rhythmic ambiguity against a simple, singing melodic character."

In 1987 Saulnier joined the music faculty of the Université du Québec à Montréal, and in 1989 he was appointed to the music faculty at the Université de Montréal (UM). He ultimately became head of the piano department at the latter school. As of 2026 he still teaches as a full professor of music at the UM. His pupils include pianists Pierre-André Doucet, Charles Richard-Hamelin, Yoonjung Han, Justine Pelletier, and Serhiy Salov. Conductor Adam Johnson was also one of his students.

On the concert stage, Saulnier has performed as a soloist with the Montreal Symphony Orchestra, the Orchestre Métropolitain, the Quebec Symphony Orchestra, and the Rochester Philharmonic Orchestra. With cellist Yegor Dyachov, he recorded Johannes Brahms's Cello Sonata No. 1 and Cello Sonata No. 2 on the album Sonatas for Cello and Piano (2003, Analekta). Dyachov and Saulnier later performed a benefit concert to raise funds for Lougheed House in 2011. In 2014 Saulnier was a featured soloist at the Abbey Bach Festival in Oregon.
