= Duke of Huéscar =

Dukedom of Spain

Dukedom of Huéscar
- Creation date: 1563
- Created by: Philip II
- Peerage: Peerage of Spain
- First holder: María Josefa Pimentel y Girón, 1st Duchess of Huéscar
- Present holder: Fernando Fitz-James Stuart y de Solís, 17th Duke of Huéscar
- Seat: Liria Palace

Duke of Huéscar (Spanish: Duque de Huéscar) is a hereditary title in the Peerage of Spain, accompanied by the dignity of Grandee and granted in 1563 by Philip II to María Josefa Pimentel, daughter of the Dukes of Benavente, as a gift for her wedding to Fadrique Álvarez de Toledo, future Duke of Alba.

It was granted as a title for the male heirs apparent of the subsequent dukes of Alba, who until then held the Marquessate of Coria before succeeding to the Dukedom of Alba. Since then, the title has been held by the heir apparent to the Dukedom of Alba, almost as a title of courtesy.

Its name refers to the village of Huéscar in Granada, one of the jurisdictions of the House of Alba.

== History ==
The dukedom was only to be held by the male heirs apparent of the dukes of Alba. María Teresa Álvarez de Toledo, 11th Duchess of Alba (daughter of Francisco Álvarez de Toledo, 10th Duke of Alba) became the 11th Duchess of Alba after her father's death, but she was never the Duchess of Huéscar. It was her son Fernando de Silva, born in his grandfather's lifetime, who received the title at birth. This changed in 1776, when Fernando de Silva died without a male heir and his granddaughter, María Cayetana de Silva, did not have any issue from her marriage to José María Álvarez de Toledo. Cayetana de Silva claimed and received the title 13th Duchess of Alba, becoming the only female holder of the dukedom of Huéscar; her husband became jure uxoris Duke of Alba, his fifth ducal title (including Duke of Medina Sidonia, Montalto, Bivona, Fernandina).

Cayetana de Silva died childless and most of her titles were inherited by her nephew, Carlos Miguel Fitz-James Stuart, 7th Duke of Berwick. However, he did not claim the dukedom of Huéscar, which became dormant. Sixty years later, his son Jacobo asked for the resumption of the dormant dukedom. On 6 September 1871, it was restored with a grandeeship of Spain to his son and heir, Carlos María Fitz-James Stuart.

The title has been held since then by the heirs apparent of the dukes of Alba, following the tradition. The late duchess of Alba, Cayetana Fitz-James Stuart, was never Duchess of Huéscar (instead she was Duchess of Montoro), as it was her son Carlos, born in his grandfather's lifetime, who received the title at birth.

== Dukes of Huéscar (1563) ==
- María Josefa Pimentel y Girón, 1st Duchess of Huéscar (1537–1585).
- Fernando Álvarez de Toledo, 2nd Duke of Huéscar (1582–1584), only son of the 1st duchess.
- Antonio Álvarez de Toledo, 5th Duke of Alba and 3rd Duke of Huéscar (1568–1639), eldest son of the 1st duke's second brother.
- Fernando Álvarez de Toledo, 6th Duke of Alba and 4th Duke of Huéscar (1595–1667), eldest son of the 3rd duke.
- Antonio Álvarez de Toledo, 7th Duke of Alba and 5th Duke of Huéscar (1615–1690), only son of the 4th duke.
- Antonio Álvarez de Toledo, 8th Duke of Alba and 6th Duke of Huéscar (1627–1701), eldest surviving son of the 5th duke.
- Antonio Álvarez de Toledo, 9th Duke of Alba and 7th Duke of Huéscar (1669–1711), eldest son of the 6th duke.
- Francisco Álvarez de Toledo, 10th Duke of Alba and 8th Duke of Huéscar (1672–1739), second son of the 6th duke.
- Fernando de Silva, 12th Duke of Alba and 9th Duke of Huéscar (1714–1776), eldest son of the 8th duke's only daughter.
- Francisco de Silva, 10th Duke of Huéscar (1733–1770), only son of the 9th duke.
- Cayetana de Silva, 13th Duchess of Alba and 11th Duchess of Huéscar (1762–1802), only daughter of the 10th duke.
- Carlos Miguel Fitz-James Stuart, 14th Duke of Alba and 12th Duke of Huéscar (1794–1835), distant relative of the 11th duchess.
- Jacobo Fitz-James Stuart, 15th Duke of Alba and 13th Duke of Huéscar (1821–1881), eldest son of the 12th duke.
- Carlos María Fitz-James Stuart, 16th Duke of Alba and 14th Duke of Huéscar (1849–1901), eldest son of the 13th duke.
- Jacobo Fitz-James Stuart, 17th Duke of Alba and 15th Duke of Huéscar (1878–1953), eldest son of the 14th duke.
- Carlos Fitz-James Stuart, 19th Duke of Alba and 16th Duke of Huéscar (b. 1948; from 1951–2016), eldest son of the 15th duke's only daughter.
- Fernando Fitz-James Stuart, 17th Duke of Huéscar (b. 1990; from 2016), eldest son of the 16th duke.

== See also ==
- List of dukes in the peerage of Spain
- List of current grandees of Spain

== Bibliography ==
- Hidalgos de España, Real Asociación de (2018). Elenco de Grandezas y Títulos Nobiliarios Españoles. Ediciones Hidalguía. ISBN 978-84-94841-02-6.
