= Mariana de Silva-Bazán y Sarmiento =

Spanish aristocrat, writer, painter and translator

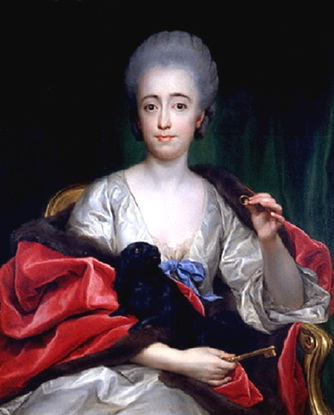
- Portrait painting of Mariana de Silva-Bazán y Sarmiento by Anton Raphael Mengs (1775)
- Born: 14 October 1739; Madrid, Spain
- Died: 17 January 1784 (aged 44); Madrid
- Spouse: Francisco de Paula de Silva y Álvarez de Toledo, 10th Duke of Huéscar (m. 1757; died 1770) José María Pignatelli de Aragón y Gonzaga (m. 1775; died 1776) Antonio Ponce de León, 11th Duke of Arcos (m. 1778; died 1780)
- Issue: María Cayetana de Silva, 13th Duchess of Alba
- Father: Pedro de Silva-Bazán y Alagón
- Occupation: aristocrat; writer; painter; translator

Mariana de Silva-Bazán y Sarmiento, also known as Mariana de Silva-Meneses and Sarmiento de Sotomayor, (Madrid, 14 October 1739 - Madrid, 17 January 1784), was an 18th-century Spanish aristocrat, writer, painter, and translator. She is remembered for being a curious example of ambidexterity, being able to write and paint with both hands. She was an academic at the Real Academia de Bellas Artes de San Fernando, serving also as honorary director.

== Early life ==
Mariana was born in Madrid on October 14, 1739. She was the daughter of Pedro de Silva-Bazán y Alagón, VIII VIII Marquis of Santa Cruz de Mudela, VII Marquis of Villasor, VIII Marquis of Viso, VI Count of Bayona, V Count of Montesano, X Baron of Sant Boi and Lord of Valdepeñas and de María Cayetana Sarmiento y Dávila, IV Marquis de Arcicóllar and VI Countess of Pie de Concha.
Her brother was José Joaquín de Silva-Bazán, director of the Royal Spanish Academy (1776-1802). Her close friend was her housekeeper, María Ana de Abad y Albret-Bearne (1759- 1801).

== Marriages ==
=== Duke of Huéscar ===
On 2 February 1757, in Madrid, she married Francisco de Paula de Silva y Álvarez de Toledo, 10th Duke of Huéscar. The couple had one child, a daughter, María Cayetana de Silva, 13th Duchess of Alba, who became the XIII Duchess of Alba, succeeding her paternal grandfather in 1776. Mariana was widowed in 1770.

=== Count of Fuentes ===
In 1775, she became engaged to José María Pignatelli de Aragón y Gonzaga, III Duke of Solferino, but his sudden death upset Mariana's plans. However, on 15 January 1775, in Madrid, Mariana married his father, Joaquín Atanasio Pignatelli de Aragón y Moncayo, XVI Count of Fuentes, VI Marquis of Mora and IV Marquis of Coscojuela. This wedding was celebrated on the same day as the wedding of her daughter, María Cayetana. In 1776, Mariana was widowed again.

=== Duke of Arcos ===
On January 1, 1778, she married for the last time. He was Antonio Ponce de León, 11th Duke of Arcos, XVIII Duke of Nájera, XIV Duke of Maqueda, II Duke of Baños, VIII Duke of Aveiro (in Portugal), XV Marquis of Zahara, XV Marquis of Elche, XII Marquis of Belmonte, XII Count of Bailén, XI Count of Casares, XXII Count of Treviño, XXI Count of Valencia of Don Juan and XII Lord of Villagarcía. She was widowed again in 1780.

== Career ==
Mariana wrote poetic works and translated some tragedies from French, also making paintings of merit according to her panegyrists, although neither her literary nor her pictorial works have been preserved to prove it. On 20 July 1766, she was named an academic at the Real Academia de Bellas Artes de San Fernando in Madrid, of which she became honorary director. She was also a member of the Imperial Academy of Arts of Saint Petersburg.
