= Fernando Fitz-James Stuart, 17th Duke of Huéscar =

21st-century Spanish nobleman

The Most Excellent Duke of Huéscar GE
- Full name: Fernando Juan María de las Mercedes Cayetano Luis Jesús Fitz-James Stuart y de Solís
- Born: 14 September 1990 (age 36); Madrid, Spain
- Noble family: Alba
- Spouse: Sofía Palazuelo y Barroso (m. 2018)
- Issue: Rosario Fitz-James Stuart y Palazuelo; Sofía Fitz-James Stuart y Palazuelo; Fernando Fitz-James Stuart y Palazuelo
- Father: Carlos Fitz-James Stuart, 19th Duke of Alba
- Mother: Matilde de Solís-Beaumont y Martínez-Campos

Fernando Juan Fitz-James Stuart y de Solís, 17th Duke of Huéscar, GE (born 14 September 1990), is a Spanish aristocrat. He is the current Duke of Huéscar, and heir apparent to the dukedom of Alba and thereby to the headship of the House of Alba.

== Life and family ==
He was born in Madrid and is the elder son of Carlos Fitz-James Stuart, 19th Duke of Alba (born 2 October 1948), and Matilde de Solís-Beaumont y Martínez-Campos (born in Navarre, Spain, 13 June 1963). On 1 February 2016, he received the title of Duke of Huéscar (the traditional title of the heir to the House of Alba since the 16th century), which was ceded by his father. He is also a direct descendant of James II of England, via an illegitimate line.

He studied in Madrid at The College for International Studies, where he met his future wife. He married his longtime girlfriend Sofía Palazuelo Barroso, daughter of Fernando Palazuelo and Sofía Barroso, on 6 October 2018 at Liria Palace in a ceremony attended by Queen Sofía of Spain, King Simeon II of Bulgaria and Princess Anne, Duchess of Calabria.

On 8 September 2020 they had a daughter, named Rosario, born at Hospital de Nuestra Señora del Rosario, in Madrid. She was baptized on 29 May 2021 in the Church of San Román (Seville). She received the names of Rosario Matilde Sofía Cayetana Dolores Teresa.

On 10 January 2023, their second child, a daughter named Sofía, was born at Hospital de Nuestra Señora del Rosario, in Madrid. The Duke was asked to rename his daughter after he had tried to give her a 25 word name of Sofia Fernanda Dolores Cayetana Teresa Angela de la Cruz Micaela del Santisimo Sacramento del Perpetuo Socorro de la Santisima Trinidad y de Todos Los Santos.

On 10 September 2025, a son named Fernando was born.

== Ancestry ==
Ancestors of Fernando Fitz-James Stuart, 17th Duke of Huéscar

8. Pedro Martínez de Irujo y Caro, 9th Duke of Sotomayor
4. Luis Martínez de Irujo y Artázcoz
9. Ana María de Artázcoz y Labayen
2. Carlos Fitz-James Stuart y Martínez de Irujo, 19th Duke of Alba
10. Jacobo Fitz-James Stuart y Falcó, 17th Duke of Alba
5. Cayetana Fitz-James Stuart y Silva, 18th Duchess of Alba
11. María del Rosario de Silva y Gurtubay, 9th Marchioness of San Vicente del Barco
1. Fernando Fitz-James Stuart, 15th Duke of Huéscar
12. Manuel de Solís-Beaumont y Desmassières, 13th Marquess of Valencina
6. Fernando de Solís-Beaumont y Atienza, 10th Marquess of la Motilla
13. María Antonia de Atienza y Benjumea
3. Matilde de Solís-Beaumont y Martínez de Campos
14. Arsenio Martínez de Campos y de la Viesca, 2nd Duke of Seo de Urgel
7. Isabel Martínez de Campos y Rodríguez
15. María de los Dolores Rodríguez y Limón

Patrilineal descent

Fernando's patriline is the line from which he is descended father to son. Patrilineal descent is the principle behind membership in Ducal Houses, as it can be traced back through the generations - which means that Fernando's historically accurate House name is Irujo.

1. Juan Martínez de Irujo
2. Martín Martínez de Irujo y Tavar, born 1613
3. Juan Martínez de Irujo y Mearín, born 1648
4. Francisco Martínez de Irujo y Éspoz, born 1678
5. Manuel Martínez de Irujo y de Erice, born 1718
6. Carlos Martínez de Irujo, 1st Marquess of Casa Irujo, 1763–1824
7. Carlos Martínez de Irujo, 2nd Marquess of Casa Irujo, 1803–1855
8. Carlos Martínez de Irujo, 8th Duke of Sotomayor, 1846–1909
9. Pedro Martínez de Irujo, 9th Duke of Sotomayor, 1882–1957
10. Luis Martínez de Irujo y Artázcoz, 1919–1972
11. Carlos Fitz-James Stuart, 19th Duke of Alba, b. 1948
12. Fernando Fitz-James Stuart, 17th Duke of Huéscar, b. 1990

== Titles, styles, honours and arms ==
=== Titles ===
Dukedoms

- 17th Duke of Huéscar, Grandee of Spain

=== Styles ===
- 1990–2016: The Most Excellent Don Fernando Fitz-James Stuart y de Solís
- 2016–present: The Most Excellent The Duke of Huéscar

=== Arms ===
Spanish nobility
Preceded by Carlos Fitz-James Stuart	Duke of Huéscar; 2016 – present	Incumbent
