= Carlos Fitz-James Stuart, 19th Duke of Alba =

Spanish lawyer and nobleman

The Most Excellent Carlos Fitz-James Stuart 19th Duke of Alba GE
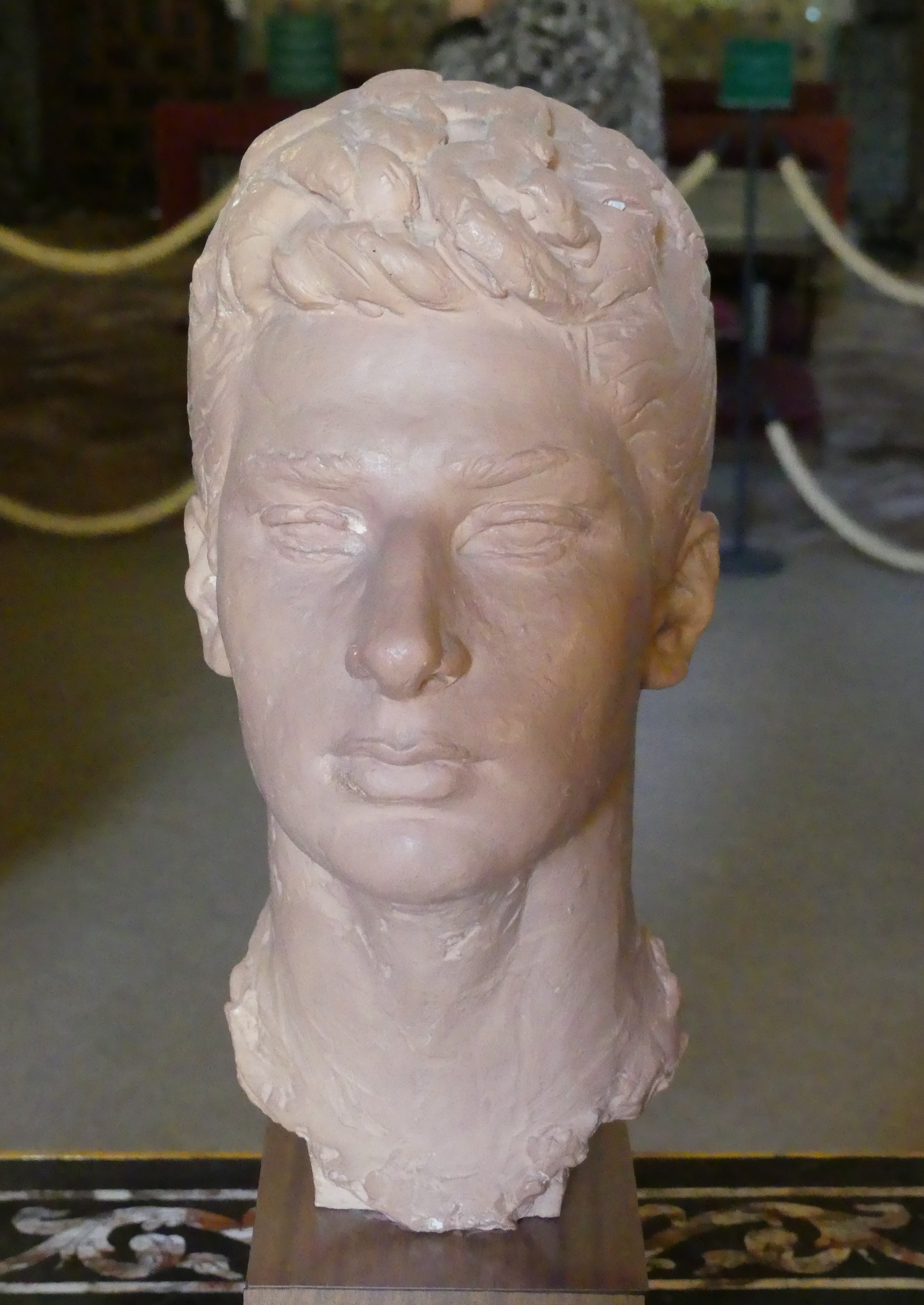
- Carlos Fitz-James Stuart, in a bust of 1962
- Born: Carlos Juan Martínez de Irujo y Fitz-James-Stuart; 2 October 1948 (age 77); Madrid, Spain
- Spouse: Matilde de Solís-Beaumont y Martínez-Campos (m. 1988; div. 2004)
- Children: Fernando Fitz-James Stuart, 17th Duke of Huéscar; Carlos Fitz-James Stuart, 22nd Count of Osorno
- Parents: Luis Martínez de Irujo y Artázcoz (father); Cayetana Fitz-James Stuart, 18th Duchess of Alba (mother)
- Family: House of Alba

Carlos Fitz-James Stuart y Martínez de Irujo, (Note: Although his paternal surname is Martínez de Irujo and his maternal family name is Fitz-James Stuart, he reversed the order of his surnames.) 19th Duke of Alba, GE (né Martínez de Irujo y Fitz-James Stuart; born 2 October 1948), is a Spanish aristocrat. He is the head of the House of Alba, one of the most prominent families of the Spanish nobility.

== Life and career ==
He was born in Madrid and is the eldest son of Cayetana Fitz-James Stuart, 18th Duchess of Alba (28 March 1926 in Madrid – 20 November 2014 in Seville) and her first husband, Luis Martínez de Irujo (17 November 1919 in Madrid – 6 September 1972 in Houston), a younger son of the 9th Duke of Sotomayor. In 1951 (at the age of 2), he became the 14th Duke of Huéscar – a title which was ceded to him by his grandfather, Jacobo Fitz-James Stuart, 17th Duke of Alba and 13th Duke of Huéscar. He is a direct descendant of James II of England and VII of Scotland

He obtained a degree in law at the Complutense University of Madrid and now works as an adviser for several cultural institutions, such as the Hispania Nostra Foundation, the Valencia de Don Juan Institute, and the Hispanic Society of America. He is in charge of the House of Alba Foundation and, thus, in principle of a great deal of the significant House of Alba heritage and patrimony. He is also a Knight of the Real Maestranza de Caballería de Sevilla.

Arms of the 19th Duke of Alba

Upon the death of his mother in 2014, he was first in line to succeed as 19th Duke of Alba (and Grandee of Spain) and also to inherit 38 other titles (10 of them with a Grandeeship of Spain). The succession to most of the titles was officially confirmed in 2015 except for the Lordship (Señorío) of Moguer and the County of Modica that have been inherited traditionally. Later in 2015, he ceded two titles – Duke of Huéscar to his elder son and heir apparent Fernando, and Count of Osorno to his younger son Carlos.

== Family ==
On 13 June 1988, he married Matilde de Solís-Beaumont y Martínez de Campos in the Seville Cathedral. She is the daughter of Fernando de Solís y Atienza, 10th Marquess of la Motilla, and his wife Isabel Martínez de Campos Rodríguez, daughter of the Duke and Duchess of Seo de Urgel.

The couple had two sons before their marriage was annulled in 2004:

- Fernando Fitz-James Stuart y de Solís, 17th Duke of Huéscar, Grandee of Spain (born 14 September 1990); married Sofía Palazuelo Barroso on 6 October 2018.
  - Rosario Fitz-James Stuart y Palazuelo (8 September 2020)
  - Sofía Fitz-James Stuart y Palazuelo (10 January 2023)
  - Fernando Fitz-James Stuart y Palazuelo (10 September 2025)
- Carlos Fitz-James Stuart y de Solís, 22nd Count of Osorno, Grandee of Spain (born 29 November 1991); married Belén Corsini de Lacalle on 22 May 2021.
  - Carlos Fitz-James Stuart y Corsini (4 March 2024)
  - Fadrique Fitz-James Stuart y Corsini (9 June 2025)

Subsequently, between 2004 and 2006, he maintained a friendly relationship with Alicia Koplowitz, a Spanish businesswoman who ranked as Spain's richest woman in the Forbes World's Richest People list.

== Titles, styles, honours and arms ==
=== Titles ===
Dukedoms

- 19th Duke of Alba, Grandee of Spain
- 12th Duke of Berwick, Grandee of Spain
- 16th Duke of Huéscar, Grandee of Spain - ceded to his son Don Fernando
- 12th Duke of Liria and Jérica, Grandee of Spain

Count-Dukedoms

- 13th Count-Duke of Olivares, Grandee of Spain

Marquessates

- 17th Marquess of Carpio, Grandee of Spain
- 17th Marquess of La Algaba
- 19th Marquess of Barcarrota
- 11th Marquess of Castañeda
- 24th Marquess of Coria
- 15th Marquess of Eliche
- 17th Marquess of Mirallo
- 21st Marquess of la Mota
- 21st Marquess of Moya
- 13th Marquess of Osera
- 15th Marquess of San Leonardo
- 20th Marquess of Sarria
- 13th Marquess of Tarazona
- 16th Marquess of Valdunquillo
- 19th Marquess of Villanueva del Fresno
- 18th Marquess of Villanueva del Río

Countships

- 23rd Count of Lemos, Grandee of Spain
- 21st Count of Lerín, Grandee of Spain, Constable of Navarre
- 21st Count of Miranda del Castañar, Grandee of Spain
- 17th Count of Monterrey, Grandee of Spain
- 21st Count of Osorno, Grandee of Spain - ceded to his son Don Carlos
- 20th Count of Andrade
- 15th Count of Ayala
- 17th Count of Casarrubios del Monte
- 17th Count of Fuentes de Valdepero
- 12th Count of Fuentidueña
- 18th Count of Galve
- 19th Count of Gelves
- 22nd Count of Modica (Kingdom of Sicily)
- 26th Count of San Esteban de Gormaz
- 13th Count of Santa Cruz de la Sierra
- 21st Count of Villalba

Viscountcies

- 13th Viscount of la Calzada

Lordship

- 30th Lord of Moguer

=== Honours ===
- Knight Grand Cross of the Royal Order of Isabella the Catholic
- Knight Grand Cross of Justice of the Sacred Military Constantinian Order of Saint George. Vice Grand Prefect (1970–1990).
- Knight of the Illustrious Royal Order of Saint Januarius.

== Notes ==
Spanish nobility
Preceded by Cayetana Fitz-James Stuart	Duke of Alba, et cetera 20 November 2014 – present	Incumbent
Preceded by Cayetana Fitz-James Stuart	Count of Osorno; 20 November 2014 – 25 November 2015	Succeeded by Carlos Fitz-James-Stuart y de Solís
Preceded by Jacobo Fitz-James Stuart	Duke of Huéscar; 15 January 1951 – 25 November 2015	Succeeded by Fernando Fitz-James Stuart y de Solís
Italian nobility
Preceded by Cayetana Fitz-James Stuart	Count of Modica; 20 November 2014 – present	Incumbent
