= Fernando de Silva, 12th Duke of Alba =

Spanish politician and general

The Most Excellent Fernando de Silva 12th Duke of Alba GE
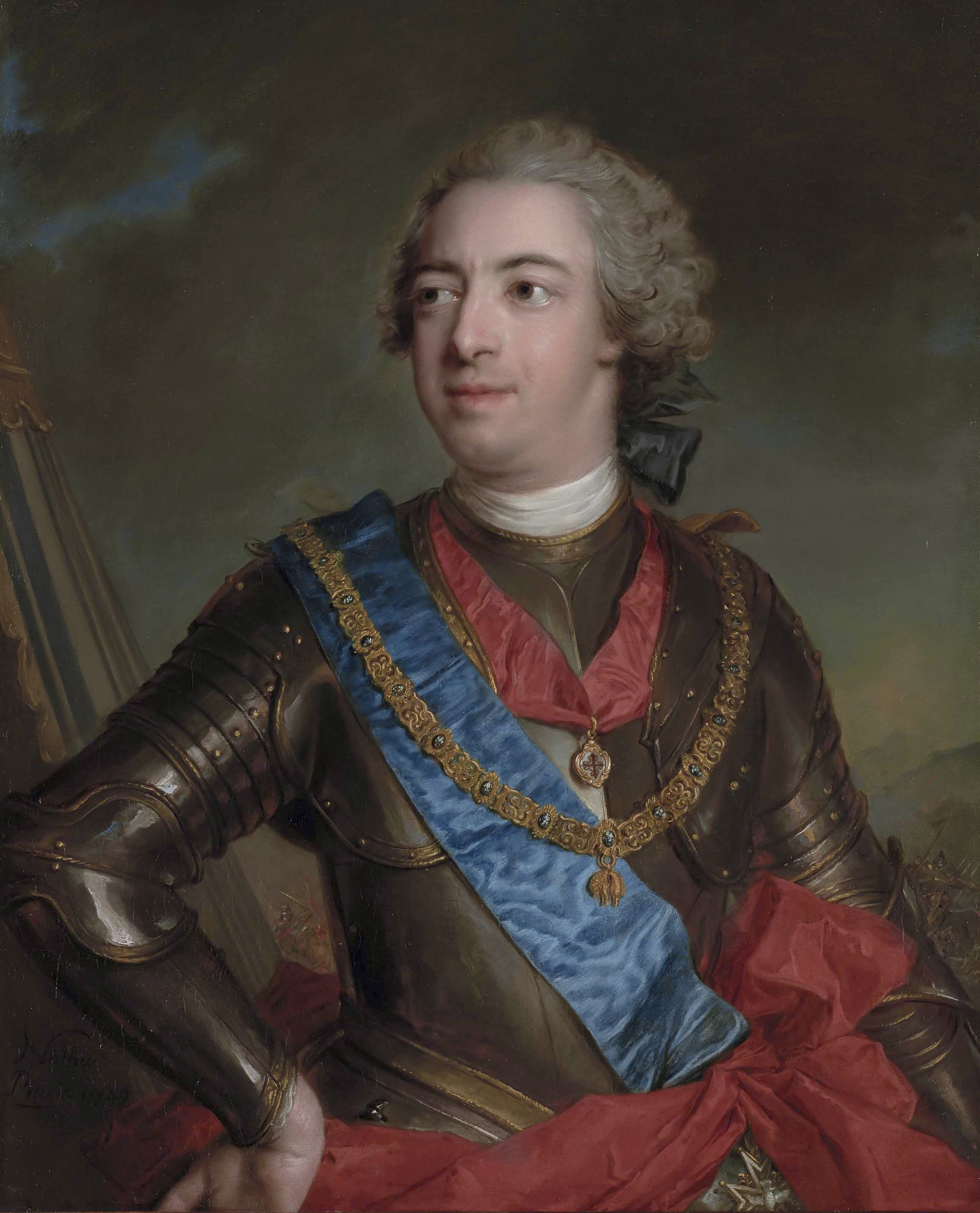
- Portrait by Jean-Marc Nattier, 1749

Chief Minister of Spain
- In office 9 April 1754 – 15 May 1754
- Monarch: Ferdinand VI
- Preceded by: José de Carvajal y Lancáster
- Succeeded by: Ricardo Wall

Seat O of the Real Academia Española
- In office 17 April 1754 – 15 November 1776
- Preceded by: José de Carvajal y Lancáster
- Succeeded by: José Joaquín de Silva-Bazán

Director of the Real Academia Española
- In office 17 April 1754 – 15 November 1776
- Preceded by: José de Carvajal y Lancáster
- Succeeded by: José Joaquín de Silva-Bazán

Personal details
- Born: Fernando de Silva y Álvarez de Toledo; 27 October 1714 Vienna, Archduchy of Austria, Holy Roman Empire
- Died: 15 November 1776 (aged 62) Madrid, Spain
- Spouse: Ana María Alvarez de Toledo y de Portugal
- Children: Francisco de Paula de Silva y Álvarez de Toledo, 10th Duke of Huéscar
- Parents: Manuel Maria de Silva y Mendoza, 9th Count of Galve (father); María Teresa Álvarez de Toledo y Haro (mother)

Fernando de Silva y Álvarez de Toledo, 12th Duke of Alba (27 October 1714 – 15 November 1776), was a Spanish politician and general who was Prime Minister of Spain in 1754.

== Biography ==
Better known as the Duke of Huéscar, Fernando de Silva was a man of the Enlightenment and friend of Jean-Jacques Rousseau. He was Spanish ambassador to France between 1746 and 1749. On 8 November 1753 he was appointed Mayordomo mayor and chief of the Royal Household and, on 9 April 1754 he was made director of the Real Academia Española, a function he held until his death in 1776.

He was also Chief Minister of Spain between 9 April and 15 May 1754. As Duke of Alba, he was succeeded by his granddaughter María del Pilar de Silva, 13th Duchess of Alba, who was a friend of Francisco de Goya, who visited their villa on several occasions and painted there in 1786 El verano and La vendimia.

== Descendants ==
He had married Ana María Alvarez de Toledo y de Portugal, (1710–1738), daughter of the 9th Count of Oropesa. They had one son, who pre-deceased his father:

- Francisco de Paula de Silva Mendoza y Toledo, 10th Duke of Huéscar, (1733–1770) who had one daughter.
  - María del Pilar de Silva, 13th Duchess of Alba (1762–1802).

== Ancestry ==
Ancestors of Fernando de Silva, 12th Duke of Alba

16. Rui Gomes de Silva, 3rd Duke of Pastrana
8. Rodrigo de Silva y Mendoza, 4th Duke of Pastrana
17. Leonor de Guzmán el Bueno y Silva
4. Gregorio María de Silva y Mendoza, 9th Duke of the Infantado
18. Diego Gomez de Sandoval y de La Cerda
9. Catalina Gomez de Sandoval, 6th Marchioness del Cenete
19. Luisa de Mendoza, Countess of Saldaña
2. Manuel José de Sylva y Toledo, 10th Count of Galve
20. Diego Lopez de Haro, 5th Marquess of El Carpio
10. Luis Mendez de Haro, 1st Duke of Montoro (= 28)
21. Francisca de Guzman y Pimentel
5. María Mendez de Haro y Fernandez de Cordoba
22. Enrique de Aragón Folc de Cardona y Córdoba, 5th Duke of Segorbe
11. Catalina Fernandez de Cordoba y Folch de Cardona (= 29)
23. Catalina Fernández de Córdova Figueroa
1. Fernando de Silva, 12th Duke of Alba
24. Fernando Alvarez de Toledo, 6th Duke of Alba
12. António Alvarez de Toledo, 7th Duke of Alba
25. Antónia Enriquez, 5th Marchioness of Villanueva del Río
6. Francisco Álvarez de Toledo, 10th Duke of Alba
26. Diego Pedro de Sylva y Portugal, 1st Marquess of Orani
13. Guiomar de Sylva
27. Lucrécia Corella y Mendoza
3. María Teresa Álvarez de Toledo, 11th Duchess of Alba
28. Luis Mendez de Haro, 1st Duke of Montoro (= 10)
14. Gaspar Mendez de Haro, 7th Marquess del Carpio
29. Catalina Fernandez de Cordoba y Folch de Cardona (= 11)
7. Catalina Mendez de Haro, 8th marquesa del Carpio
30. Juan Gaspar Enriquez, 6th Duke of Medina de Rioseco
15. Teresa Enriquez de Cabrera y Alvarez de Toledo
31. Elvira Álvarez de Toledo Osorio Ponce de León

== Sources ==
- Hobbs, Nicolas (2007). "Grandes de España" (in Spanish). Archived from the original on 29 November 2006.
- Instituto de Salazar y Castro. Elenco de Grandezas y Titulos Nobiliarios Españoles (in Spanish). periodic publication.
- "DUQUES DE ALBA: Genealogía" (in Spanish). 2007. Archived from the original on 19 February 2009.
- "Geneall.net" (in Spanish). 2007.

Political offices
Preceded by José de Carvajal	First Secretary of State; 1754	Succeeded by Ricardo Wall
Academic offices
Preceded by José de Carvajal	O seat of The Royal Spanish Academy; 1774–1776	Succeeded by The Marquess of Santa Cruz
Spanish nobility
Preceded by María Teresa; Álvarez de Toledo	Duke of Alba, et cetera 1755–1776	Succeeded by María del Pilar de Silva
Preceded by María Teresa; Álvarez de Toledo	Duke of Huéscar; 1755–1776	Succeeded by Francisco de Silva
Italian nobility
Preceded by María Teresa; Álvarez de Toledo	Count of Modica; 1755–1776	Succeeded by María del Pilar de Silva
