= Francisco de Paula de Silva y Álvarez de Toledo, 10th Duke of Huéscar =

Spanish nobleman

Don Francisco de Paula de Silva y Álvarez de Toledo, 10th Duke of Huéscar (in full, Spanish: Don Francisco de Paula de Silva y Álvarez de Toledo, décimo duque de Huéscar), (1733–1770), was a Spanish nobleman.

He was the son of Fernando de Silva Mendoza y Toledo, 12th Duke of Alba and of Ana María Bernarda Álvarez de Toledo y Portugal. On 2 February 1757, he married Mariana de Silva-Bazán y Sarmiento, and they had only one daughter, María del Pilar de Silva, who succeeded him as Duchess of Huéscar and later, her grandfather as Duchess of Alba.

== Sources ==
- Hobbs, Nicolas (2007). "Grandes de España" (in Spanish).
- Instituto de Salazar y Castro. Elenco de Grandezas y Titulos Nobiliarios Españoles (in Spanish).

Spanish nobility
| Preceded by Fernando de Silva | Duke of Huéscar; 1755–1770 | Succeeded by María del Pilar de Silva |
