= Yoonjung Han =

Yoonie Han
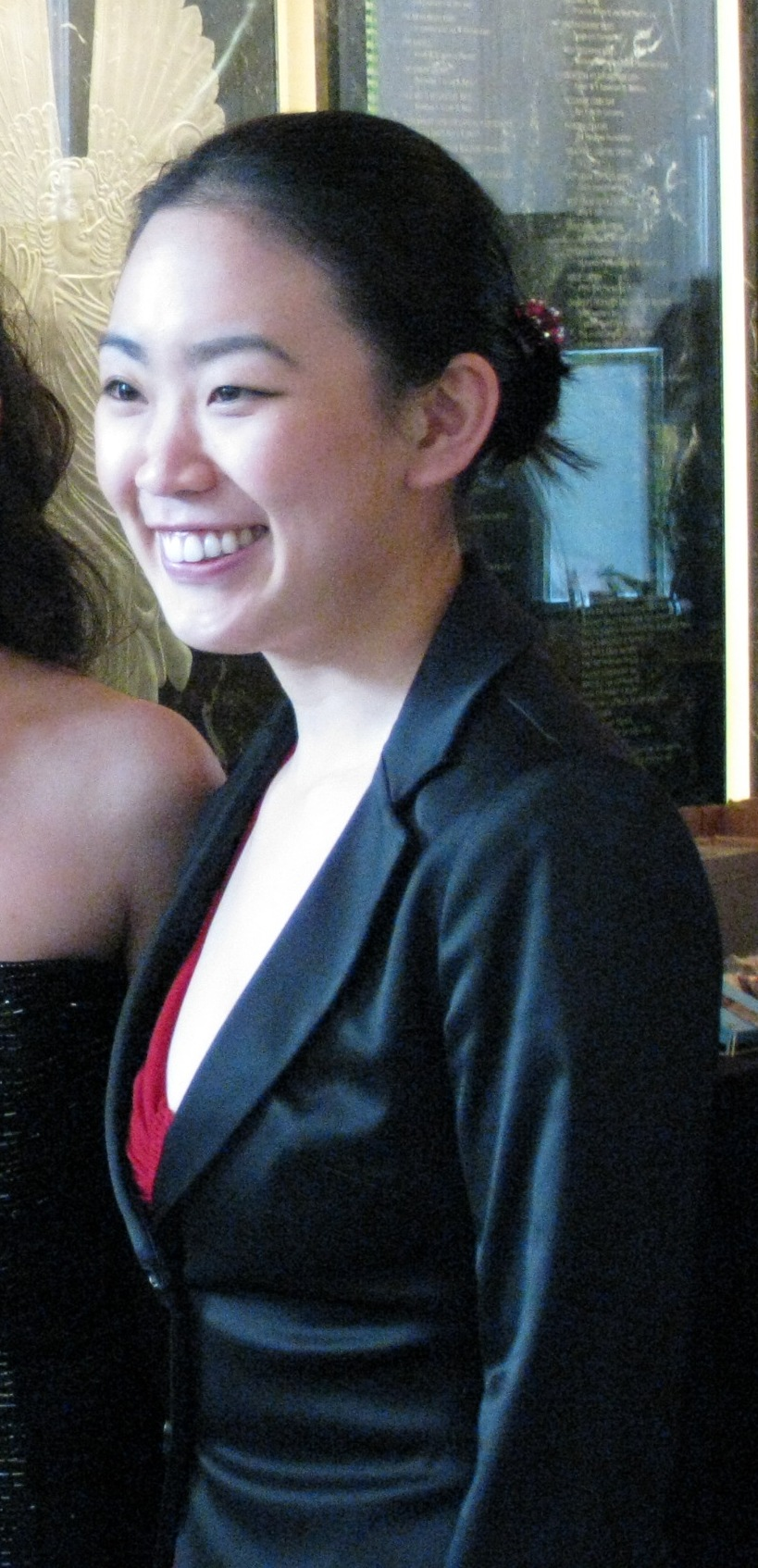
- Yoonie Han

Background information
- Born: Yoonjung Han; January 12, 1985 (age 41); South Korea
- Origin: New York City, New York, United States
- Genres: Classical
- Occupations: Pianist, professor, entertainer
- Instrument: Piano
- Years active: 1998-present
- Labels: Steinway & Sons, Universal Music Group, Centaur, Concert Artists Guild
- Website: www.yooniehan.com

- Yoonjung Han
- Hangul: 한윤정
- Hanja: 韓侖廷
- RR: Han Yunjeong
- MR: Han Yunjŏng

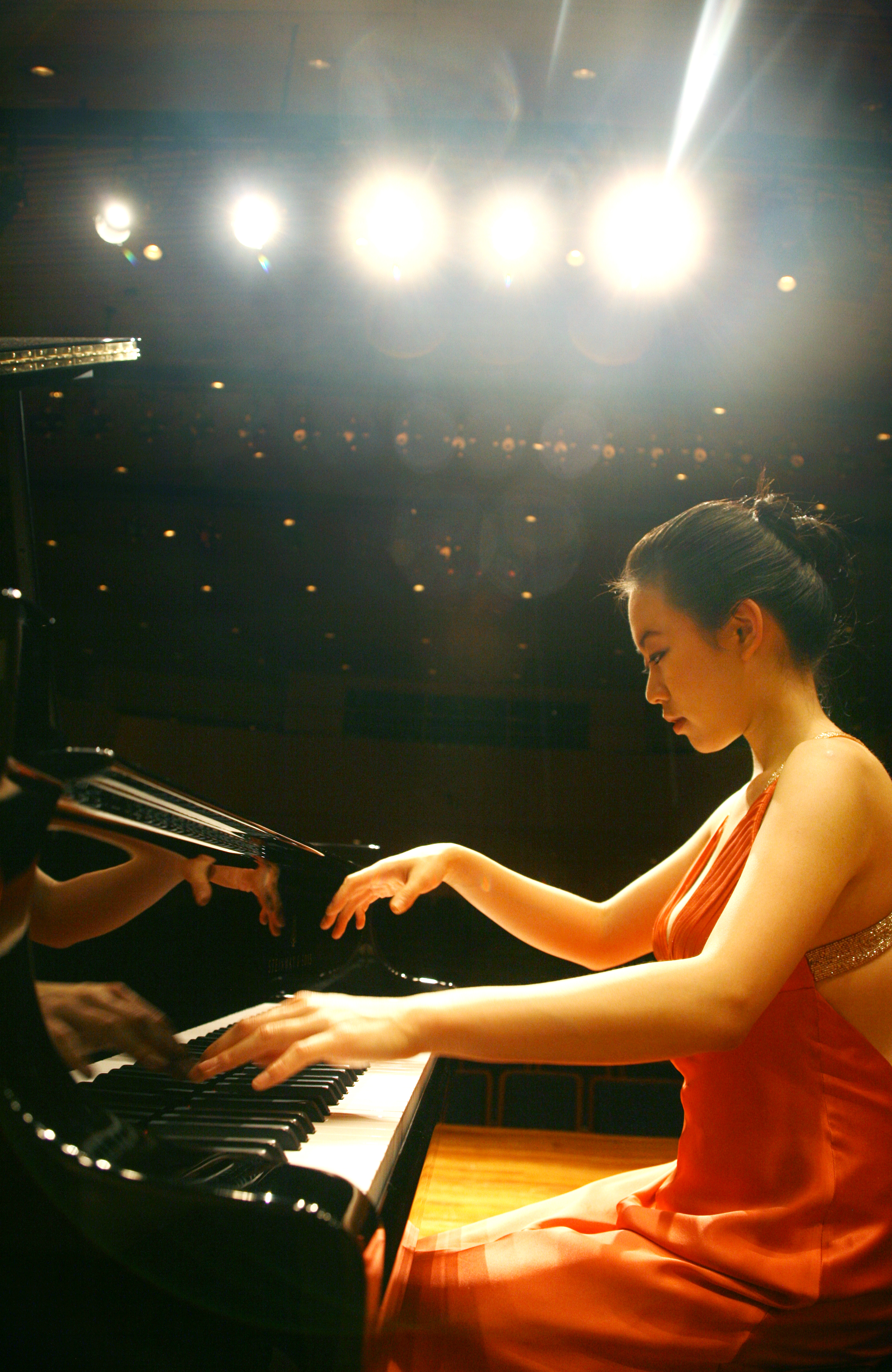
Yoonie Han at her concert at Sejong Arts Center, S.Korea

Yoonjung "Yoonie" Han (born January 12, 1985, in South Korea) is a South Korean-born American classical pianist.

== Education ==
State University of New York Stony Brook (Stony Brook, NY); Doctor of Musical Arts	2016
Université de Montréal (Montréal, Canada); Artist Diploma	2011
The Juilliard School (New York, NY); Master of Music	2009
The Curtis Institute of Music (Philadelphia, PA); Bachelor of Music	2007
The Juilliard School Pre-College (New York, NY)	2003

Principal teachers: Robert McDonald, Eleanor Sokoloff, Eduardus Halim, Jean Saulnier, Victoria Mushkatkol

== Teaching ==
Academic positions:

- Assistant professor, Hong Kong Baptist University, Hong Kong (2018–present)
- Assistant professor, Bilkent University, Turkey (2015–2018)
- Piano faculty, Lambda School of Music and Fine Arts, Canada, (2010–2011)

University masterclasses and seminars:

- Harvard University
- Baruch College, The City University of New York
- Stony Brook University, State University of New York
- California State University Sacramento
- San Francisco Conservatory
- New York University
- Amalfi Coast Music Festival
- AmiCa Piano Festival
- Boston University
- New Jersey City University
- Emory University
- San Francisco State University
- Shorter University
- College of William and Mary
- Lunigiana International Music Festival
- Music Fest Perugia
- University of North Florida
- Western New Mexico University
- Washington International Piano Competition
- University of North Dakota
- Georgia SouthWestern State University
- Oxford College, Emory University
- University of Arkansas

== Career ==
Han's first competitive performance was at age 13, in the Seoul Philharmonic Concerto competition, which she won. This was followed by many more such engagements. In 2010, music critic Jon Sobel wrote that she would likely be among the premier young pianists of the decade, "one of those natural-born performers who become one with the instrument—not trying to surmount it, as a more showy pianist might, but rather losing herself in the music like an actor merging magnetically with a role." Han has also enjoyed special sponsorships from Roche Bobois, the Paris-based international retailer of fine furniture; Breguet, France's leading maker of luxury timepieces, and Dolce & Gabbana, the Italian fashion house, which has supplied gowns for her concerts.

Han's most recent album, Hollywood Romance (2020), featuring classical piano pieces from Hollywood Golden Age films, was released on Universal Music Group label. Han recorded three albums on the Steinway & Sons label. The first album, Love and Longing (2014) was quickly raised on the Classical Billboard chart and was nominated as "Album of the Week" on WQXR. Her second album with Steinway & Sons was released in 2017, Enrique Granados' complete Goyescas to mark the 150th anniversary of the composer's birth. The album features Black Duchess of Alba of Francisco Goya. Her third album with Steinway & Sons presents the complete Le Rossignol Éperdu: 53 Piano Poems (2019) by Reynaldo Hahn. Her other albums include Debut (2013) on Concert Artists Guild label, Gloriosa Trio (2019) on the Centaur Records label, and Liszt on Steinway (2017), Prokofiev on Steinway (2017), and Steinway Piano Chilling (2017) on the Steinway & Sons label.

She was an assistant professor at Bilkent University in Turkey from 2015 to 2018. Currently she is an assistant professor at Hong Kong Baptist University. Han is a Steinway & Sons concert and recording artist as well as a Steinway Honorary Teacher.

=== 1998–2008 ===
At age thirteen, Han made her solo debut with the Seoul Philharmonic Orchestra at Sejong Concert Hall, playing Beethoven's Piano Concerto Number 3 in C minor.

Han won the Concerto Competition at the Juilliard Pre-College and performed with the Symphony at the Juilliard Theater. In 2005, she performed the Rachmaninoff Piano Concerto Number 2 in C minor with the Pottstown Symphony Orchestra in Pottstown, Pennsylvania as part of their Masterworks II: Young Artist Showcase program. She was selected as one of the thirty-eight pianists worldwide in May 2005, participated in the TCU/Cliburn Piano Institute Young Artists program in conjunction with the Twelfth Van Cliburn International Piano Competition, performing at the Modern Art Museum of Fort Worth and the PepsiCo Recital Hall at the TCU Walsh Center for Performing Arts.

In February 2006, Han performed a two-hour recital of Bach-Busoni, Mozart, Chopin, and Liszt at Dudley Recital Hall at the University of Houston. In July 2006, she performed as a soloist with the Buffalo Philharmonic Orchestra in their "Bravo Beethoven" concert at Artpark. As the 2005 Kosciuszko Foundation Chopin Competition winner, in November 2006, Han performed solo recitals at the Consulate General of the Republic of Poland in New York.

In March 2007, Han performed a recital at the Fifth Annual Steinway Piano Festival at Dauer Hall at the University of Florida. In September 2007, she opened the Shreveport Symphony Orchestra's 60th season, performing the Liszt Piano Concerto Number 1 in E-flat major in their Diamond Jubilee concert.

In June 2008, Han won the 2008 Juilliard Gina Bachauer International Piano Competition, and the Munz Chopin Competition. Along with a Lincoln Center recital, the winners received full-tuition scholarships to Juilliard. In August 2008, Han performed Mozart's Piano Concerto Number 22 in E-flat major, K. 482 at Eric Harvie Theatre with the Banff Festival Orchestra at the 2008 Banff Summer Arts Festival in Banff National Park, Alberta, Canada. In October 2008, she gave a recital at the Taft Museum of Art in Cincinnati, Ohio as the gold medalist of the 2008 Cincinnati World Piano Competition.

=== 2009–2010 ===
In June 2009, Han performed in the Dame Myra Hess Memorial Concert Series at Preston Bradley Hall of the Chicago Cultural Center. The concert was also broadcast live on WFMT (98.7 FM) radio and Channel 25 television.

She performed again at the Vladimir Nielsen Piano Festival in Sag Harbor, New York.

Han received the 2009 Gawon International Music Society of Seoul, South Korea award. This award is given to the "most brilliant pianist aged 17-31 of any nationality who possesses the most promising potential for global prominence, to provide support for the artist's continued development and maturation as a musician." Han performed a solo recital at the Sejong Center for the Performing Arts in Seoul, South Korea in September 2009, as part of the award.

In April 2010, Han performed a solo recital of Haydn, Chopin, Granados, and R. Schumann at Starr Theater, Alice Tully Hall, Lincoln Center in New York City.

In July 2010, she won the Keyboard Charitable Trust Career Development Award at the Concurso Internacional de Piano in Florianópolis, Santa Catarina, Brazil.

=== 2011–2013 ===
In April 2011, Han won the Fourth Prize at the Premi Internacional Pianístic de Paterna in Paterna, Valencia, Spain.

In May 2011, she won the First Prize and Audience Prize out of 150 entrants from 40 countries at the Fulbright Concerto Competition in Fayetteville, Arkansas. On May 28, 2011, she won the First Prize, Louis A. Potter Award out of 222 entrants at the 2011 Washington International Competition for Piano at the John F. Kennedy Center for the Performing Arts in Washington, D.C. In September 2011, she was one of six pianists in the world named a finalist for the Arturo Benedetti Michelangeli Prize awarded by the city of Eppan an der Weinstraße, Italy. In November 2011, she won the Rencontre International de Piano competition in Paris, sponsored by the Automobile Club de France.

In November 2011, Han made her European debut playing Beethoven's Piano Concerto No. 4 with the Berliner Symphoniker at the main stage of Berlin Philharmonie. The following week, she continued her European tour, playing at the Beckstein in Frankfurt, Germany, and then at the Salle Cortot in Paris. In December 2011 she returned to perform a solo recital of Mompou and Granados at the Dame Myra Hess Memorial Concert Series at Preston Bradley Hall of the Chicago Cultural Center. The concert was also broadcast live on WFMT (98.7 FM) radio and wfmt.com.

In March 2012, Han made her Kennedy Center solo recital debut in the Terrace Theater in Washington, DC. She played a program of Bach-Busoni Chaconne, Granados Goyescas "Los Requiebros" and "El Amor Y La Muerte," Liszt En Rêve and La Campanella, and Schumann Carnaval. The recital was presented by the Friday Morning Music Club in honor of Han's first prize in the 2011 Washington International Competition for Piano.

In July 2012, WQXR-FM New York radio broadcast Han's Dvorak "Two Slavonic Dances" and Chopin Piano Concerto No. 2 with the New York Concert Artists Symphony Orchestra conducted by as part of their weekly McGraw-Hill Companies Young Artists Showcase program.

In December 2012, Yoonie Han was honored as a Steinway Artist by Steinway & Sons in New York City, adding her to a roster of the most accomplished and discriminating artists in the world. With the support of the Fulbright Foundation and Steinway, Han was the first concert classical pianist to make a tour of major Steinway galleries in the USA and Europe. In May 2013, her first album was released by Concert Artists Guild. In the winter of 2013, she performed the Beethoven Concerto No.3 with the Santa Cruz Symphony and Boca Raton Symphonia. She collaborated with New York Philharmonic Principal Clarinetist Anthony McGill Baltimore Symphony Orchestra Principal Cellist Dariusz Skoraczewski, and Metropolitan Opera Lindemann Young Artist Program. Han performed at the Frick Collection in New York at a concert sponsored by Breguet, the luxury watchmaker. At the Frick, she performed her own transcription of Franz Liszt's Concerto No. 1. She triumphed on her Europe tour at the Concertgebouw in Netherland, Slovakia Philharmonic Hall in Slovakia, and Bergamo Festival in Italy.

=== 2014–2015 ===
In January 2014, Han's Gloriosa Piano Trio made a sold-out debut at the Flagler Museum in Palm Beach, Florida. The Trio performed at New Jersey City University, The University of North Florida, Boulder Chamber Orchestra Music Series, Shorter University, In January, she performed two concerts in a collaboration with scientists at Salk Institute in California, and Max Planck Institute in Florida.

In May 2014, Han's album Love and Longing on Steinway & Sons record label was named "Album of the Week" on WQXR, and rise quickly on the Billboard Classical chart. At her CD release party at the Louis Meisel Gallery in New York, she performed on the historic Centennial Steinway from 1876 Centennial Exposition in Philadelphia. A special dress was provided for the occasion by Dolce & Gabbana. On December, 11, she played another cooperate event for the Legal Aid Society, where she presented Schumann Carnaval Op. 9, and Gershwin Rhapsody in Blue. In June 2014, Han received the "Brava!" award from the Italian Academy Foundation. In September 2014, Han opened the season of the New Jersey Festival Orchestra, under the baton of Maestro David Wroe, with a performance of the Tchaikovsky Piano Concerto No. 1. In November 2014, Han performed at the main showroom of the French luxury furniture company, Roche Bobois, in New York, in association with Steinway and Dolce & Gabbana The concert was a huge success, she played a further recital at their San Francisco showroom and will return to the Seattle and Paris showrooms. Yoonie Han joined on the faculty of Piano and Chamber Music at the Bilkent University in Ankara, Turkey. She performed with Juilliard Residence String Quartets Attaca and Aelous and gave a seminar (2015, 2016) at Baruch College City University of New York, with its Resident String Quartet, Alexander.

=== 2015–2016 ===
In September 2015, Han performed for the Philippine Cancer Society Gala and donated her albums on Steinway & Sons. In February 2016, she played a recital for the 30th anniversary of Bilkent University Turkey. In April 2016, Han presented a seminar at Harvard University and Longy School of Music about her experience working with living composers and performed a recital for the 50th anniversary for the Davis Center for Russian Studies. In the summer of 2016, she joined as a faculty member at Amalfi Coast Music Festival Italy. In September 2016, Han gave a masterclass and performance at Boston University and New Jersey City University. She also performed for the American Cancer Society Hope Lodge at Steinway Hall in New York, and donated her albums on Steinway & Sons.

=== 2016–2017 ===
In October 2016, Han performed at Western New Mexico University and Rio Grande Theater in New Mexico. In December 2016, Han collaborated with the Canadian Brass. In February 2017, Han's second album with Enrique Granados' Goyescas was released on Steinway & Sons label to mark the 150th anniversary of the composer's birth. The cover featured the famous painting of Francisco Goya, Black Duchess of Alba. In the same month, she gave a masterclass and performance at California State University Sacramento, a seminar "Arts into Music into Performance" at Baruch College - The City University of New York, and toured with her piano trio, Gloriosa at Oxford College Emory University and Georgia South Western State University. In the summer of 2017, Han joined as a faculty member at AmiCa Piano Festival, Italy.

== Awards ==
Date	Award	Awarded by	Location
July 17, 2014	"Brava!" Award	Italian Academy Foundation	New York City, New York, US
December 5, 2012	Steinway Artist	Steinway & Sons	New York City, New York, US
November 2, 2011	Laureate	2011 Rencontre International de Piano competition sponsored by Automobile Club de France	Paris, France
September 11, 2011	Finalist, Arturo Benedetti Michelangeli Prize	2011 Arturo Benedetti Michelangeli Prize awarded by the city of Eppan	Eppan an der Weinstraße, Italy
May 28, 2011	First prize, Louis A. Potter Award	2011 Washington International Competition for Piano	Washington, D.C., US
May 22, 2011	First prize, Audience Prize	2011 Fulbright Concerto Competition	Fayetteville, Arkansas, US
April 29, 2011	Fourth Prize	2011 Premi Internacional Pianístic de Paterna	Paterna, Valencia, Spain
July 10, 2010	The Keyboard Trust Career Development Prize	2010 Concurso Internacional de Piano, The City of Florianópolis	Florianópolis, Santa Catarina, Brazil
October 3, 2009	Semifinalist	10th San Antonio International Piano Competition	San Antonio, Texas, US
September 5, 2009	First Prize	Gawon International Music Society	Seoul, South Korea
July 13, 2008	First Prize	52nd Cincinnati World Piano Competition	Cincinnati, Ohio, US
June 6, 2008	First Prize	2008 Juilliard Gina Bachauer Piano Competition	New York City, New York, US
March 10, 2008	First Prize	2008 Juilliard Munz Chopin Piano Competition	New York City, New York, US
June 7, 2007	Fifth Prize	2nd Helsinki International Maj Lind Piano Competition	Helsinki, Finland
November 5, 2006	First Prize	58th Nena Wideman Piano Competition	Shreveport, Louisiana, US
May 5, 2005	First Prize	56th Kosciuszko Foundation National Chopin Piano Competition	New York City, New York, US
July 19, 2005	Second Prize, Audience Prize	2005 International Ettore Pozzoli Piano Competition	Seregno, Milan, Italy
March 20, 2003	First Prize	2003 Music Teacher's National Association Competition	New York City, New York, US
March 18, 2004	First Prize	2004 Kathryn E. MacPhail Young Artist Competition	Pottstown, Pennsylvania, US
September 25, 2002	First Prize	2002 Juiliard Pre-College Mozart Concerto Competition	New York City, New York, US
May 15, 2002	First Prize	2002 Juilliard Frederich Nordmann Competition	New York City, New York, US
October 9, 2001	The Most Promising Young Artist Award	Ministry of Culture, Sports, and Tourism	Seoul, South Korea
October 7, 2001	Grand Prize	2001 Korea National Music Competition	Seoul, South Korea
