= The White Duchess =

Painting by Francisco de Goya

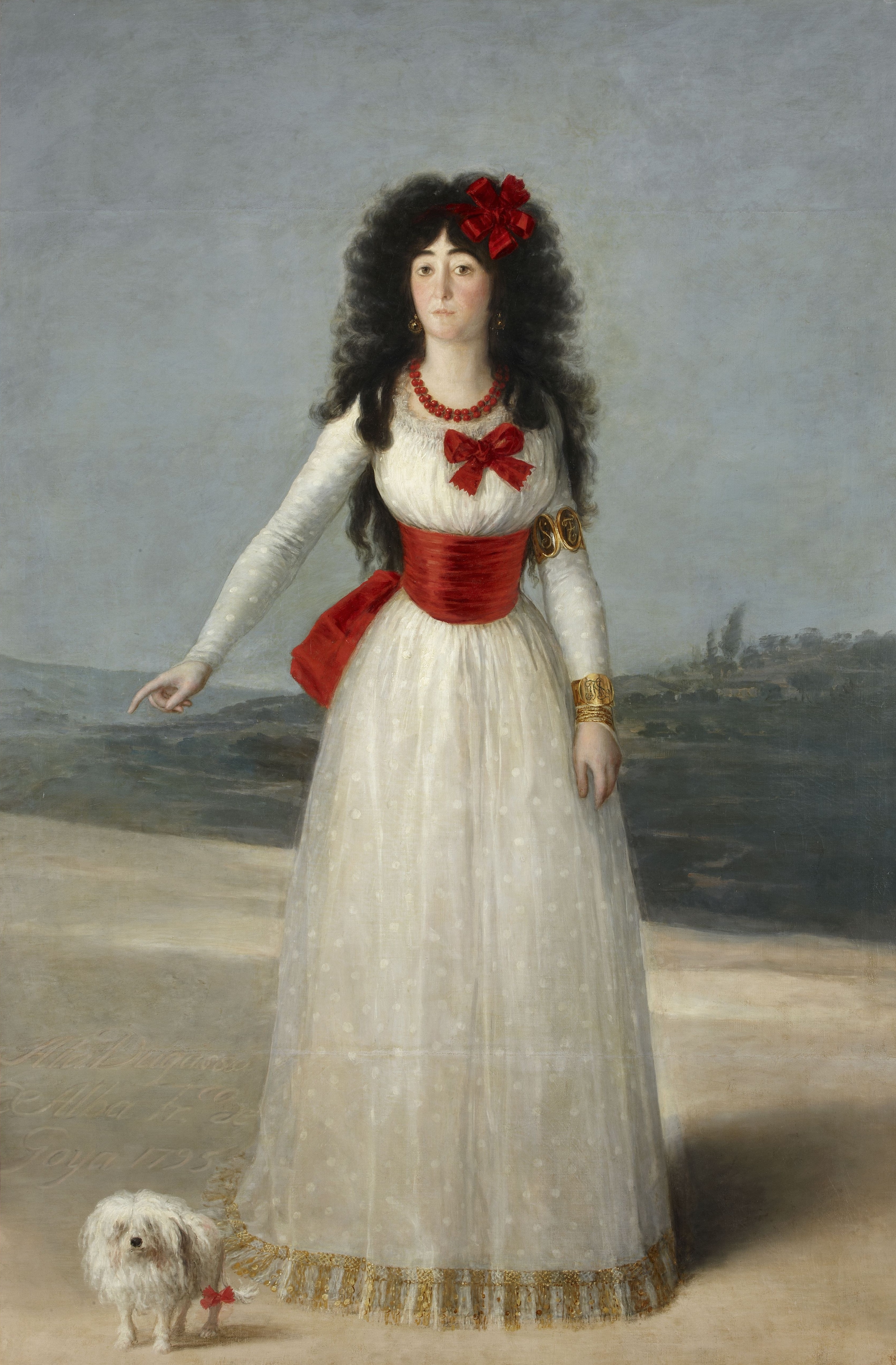
- Artist: Francisco Goya
- Year: 1795
- Medium: Oil on canvas
- Dimensions: 192 cm × 128 cm (76 in × 50 in)
- Location: Collection of the Duke of Alba

The White Duchess is a life sized (192 x 128 cm) oil-on-canvas painting by the Spanish artist Francisco Goya, completed in 1795. It portrays María Cayetana de Silva, 13th Duchess of Alba. It is in the collection of the House of Alba, in the Liria Palace, Madrid. It is one of a number of portraits Goya painted of the duchess around this time, and is usually compared alongside the similarly sized but tonally very different The Black Duchess, which was painted two years later, just after her husband, José Álvarez de Toledo died aged 39. The duke and duchess were highly placed, cultivated and well-regarded members of the 1790s Spanish Court.

The commission is first mentioned in a letter dated August 2, 1794, written to his friend Martín Zapater, which mentions that Goya that had been asked to paint life-sized portraits of the duke and duchess of Alba.

== Description ==
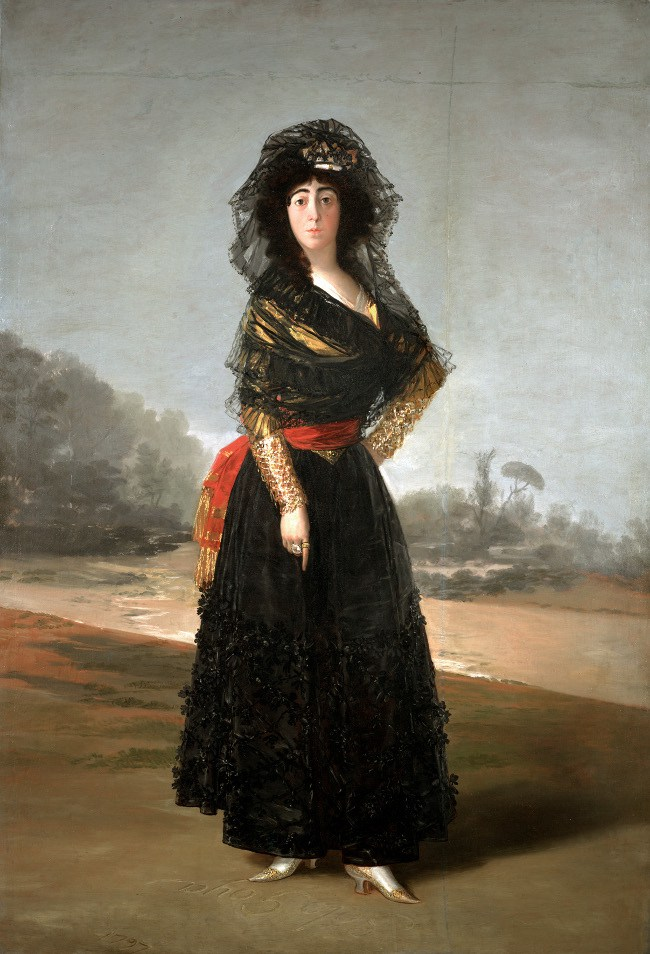
The Black Duchess, 1797, Hispanic Society of America, New York. Here de Silva is dressed in low cut Maja clothing. She may have agreed to this depiction in the expectation that it would portray her as a "woman of the people". Goya was reluctant to part with the portrait; it remained with him for at least 15 years after it was completed.

The painting is composed from white, red, blue and brown pigments, but is mostly, according to Hughes "built around two themes, red and white", with the other major colour being black, represented by her dark curly hair.

María Cayetana de Silva was then 33 years old (middle aged for the time) and had recently recovered from a lengthy illness. She is presented with affection as a great beauty, and an engaging woman of wit and education. She stands in a dignified pose, looking directly at the viewer with a penetrating gaze. She is dressed in a full-length French style flowing white dress – far more elegant than the Maja style of the 1797 painting. The dress is made from white muslin fabric hemmed with gold embroidery. She has white pearl earrings, a wide red or scarlet sash and trimming, red pearl necklace and beads and red bows on her breast and wrapped in her hair. A bolognese stands beside her. The dog also wears a red ribbon on one of its hind legs. Her left arm is adorned with golden jewelry, placed at her wrist and above her elbow. She points with the index finger of her right hand towards an inscription on the ground, which includes Goya's autograph, a dating of 1795 and "A la duquesa de Alba Fr. de Goya 1795".

The almost Neoclassical style of her dress may have been influenced by the English print cabinet style of Gainsborough, William Hogarth, George Romney and Joshua Reynolds, whose works Goya probably knew from black-and-white reproductions.

The portrait is in many ways formal. The choice to present her in an exterior indicates her wealth by displaying her land holdings. Because she was so highly respected and known to have a forceful personality, it is thought she had a strong influence on the final depiction.

Art historians have mused that a love affair existed between the painter and model, although there is no surviving evidence. Skeptics argue that because de Silva was famously beautiful, wealthy, and independent she would not have been interested in the successful but significantly older and unwell Goya. The two full-length portraits are known to have been significant to Goya. He held the Black Duchess in his possession for at least 15 years. Robert Hughes describes the "White Duchess" as a portrait fit for "semi-public consumption". Art Historian Janis Tomlinston wrote in 1994 that "no matter how liberal a patron she might have been, it seems unlikely that she would have accepted a portrait that so mercilessly emphasized her pride and hauteur".

== Gallery ==
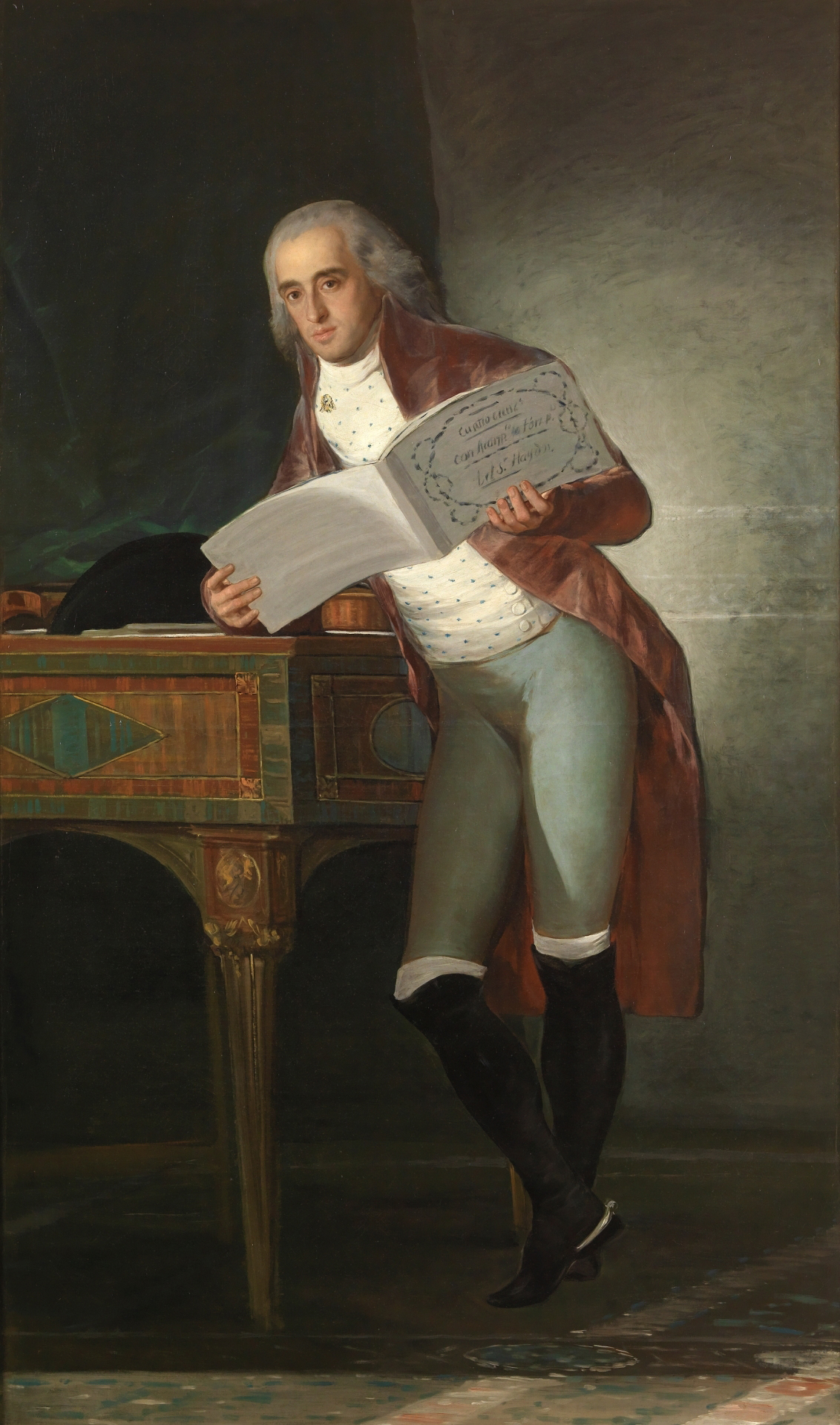
José Álvarez de Toledo, Duke of Alba, 1795. de Silva's husband and a cultivated patron of the arts

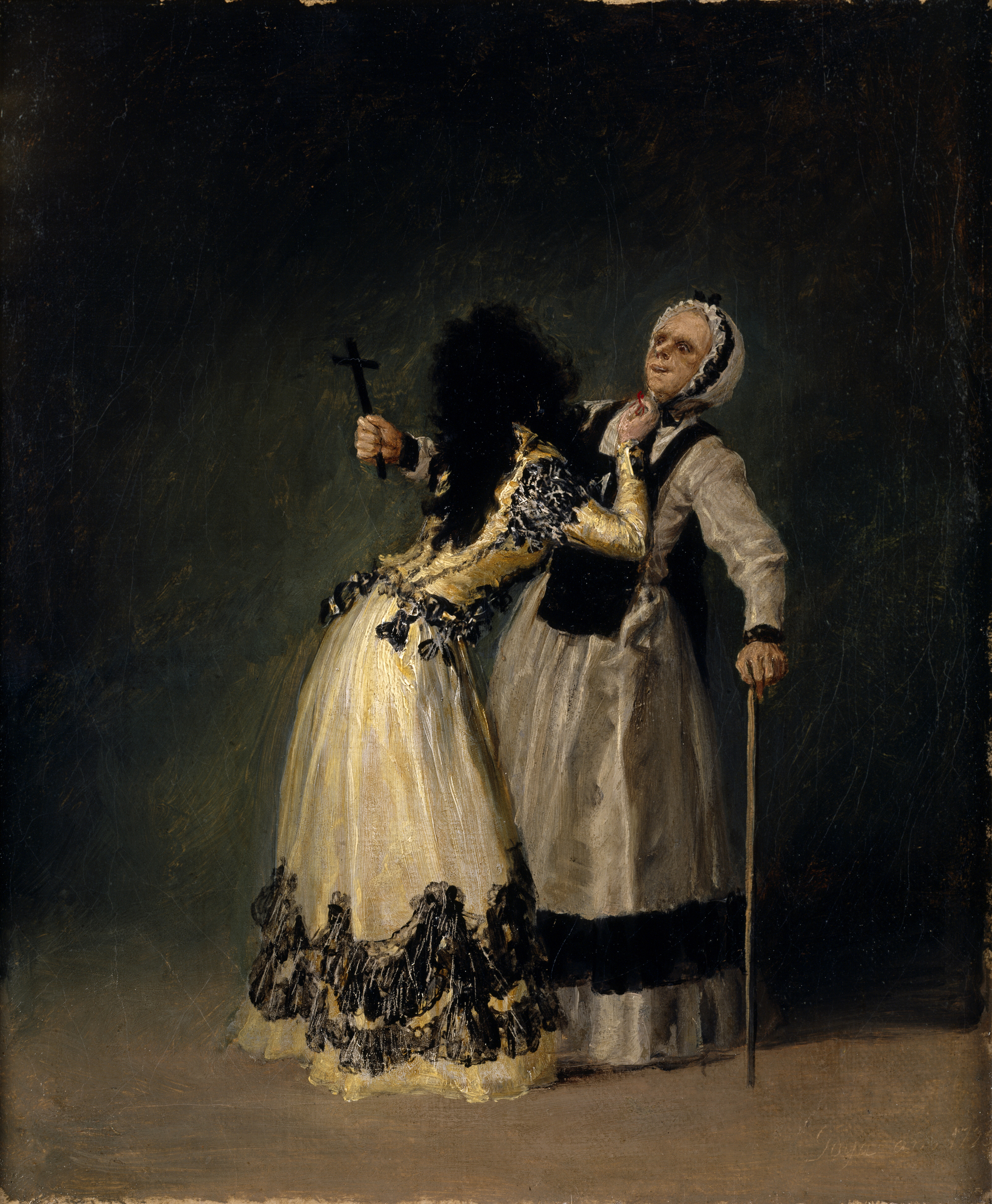
The Duchess of Alba and la Beata, 1795

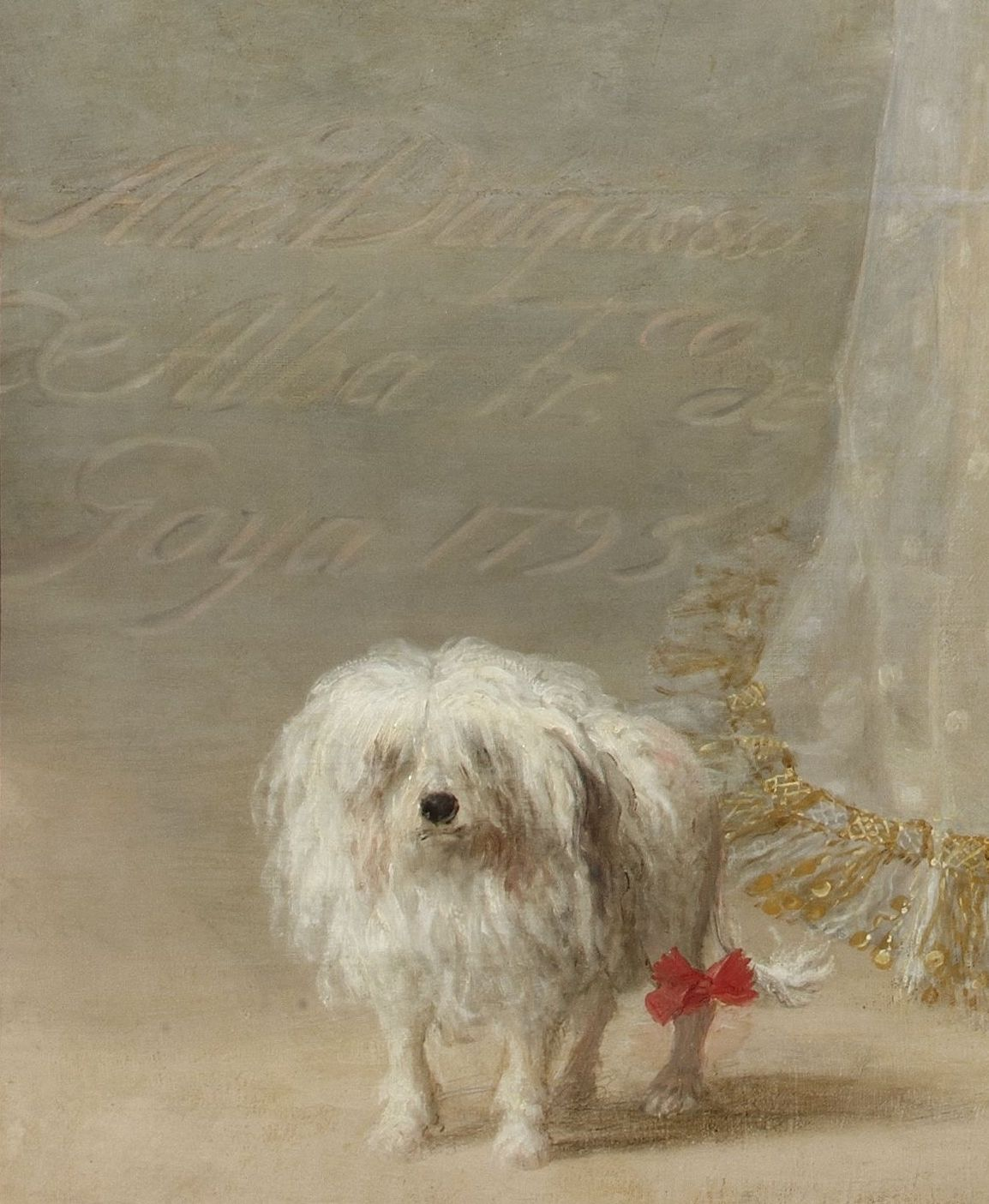
Detail showing the inscriptions in the sand

== See also ==
- List of works by Francisco Goya

== Sources ==
- Connell, Evan S. Francisco Goya: A Life. New York: Counterpoint, 2004. ISBN 1-58243-307-0
- Forty, Sandra. Francisco De Goya. TAJ, 2014. ASIN B00USAESNM
- Hughes, Robert. Goya. New York: Alfred A. Knopf, 2004. ISBN 978-0-394-58028-9
- Morales y Marín, José Luis. Goya: a catalogue of his paintings. Real Academia de Nobles y Bellas Artes de San Luis, 1997
- Tomlinston, Janis. Francisco Goya y Lucientes. Phaidon Press, 1994. ISBN 978-0-7148-2912-8
