= María Teresa de Silva, 13th Duchess of Alba =

Spanish aristocrat (1762-1802)

The Most Excellent María Teresa de Silva 13th Duchess of Alba GE (more...)
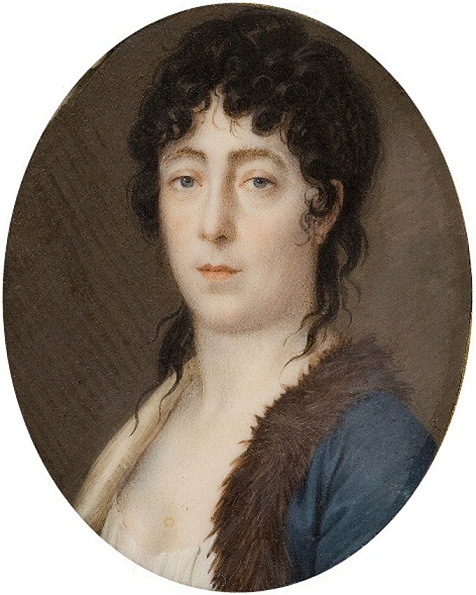
- The 13th Duchess of Alba, c. 1805 (Museo del Prado, Madrid)
- Born: María del Pilar Teresa Cayetana de Silva y Silva-Bazán; 10 June 1762; Madrid, Spain
- Died: 23 July 1802 (aged 40); Sanlúcar la Mayor, Spain
- Spouse: José Álvarez de Toledo Osorio, 11th Marquess of Villafranca
- Children: María de la Luz (adopted)
- Parents: Francisco de Silva y Álvarez de Toledo, 10th Duke of Huéscar (father); Mariana de Silva-Bazán y Sarmiento (mother)
- Family: House of Alba branch of House of Silva

María del Pilar Teresa Cayetana de Silva y Silva-Bazán, 13th Duchess of Alba, GE (10 June 1762 – 23 July 1802), was a Spanish aristocrat and a popular subject of the painter Francisco de Goya.

== Biography ==
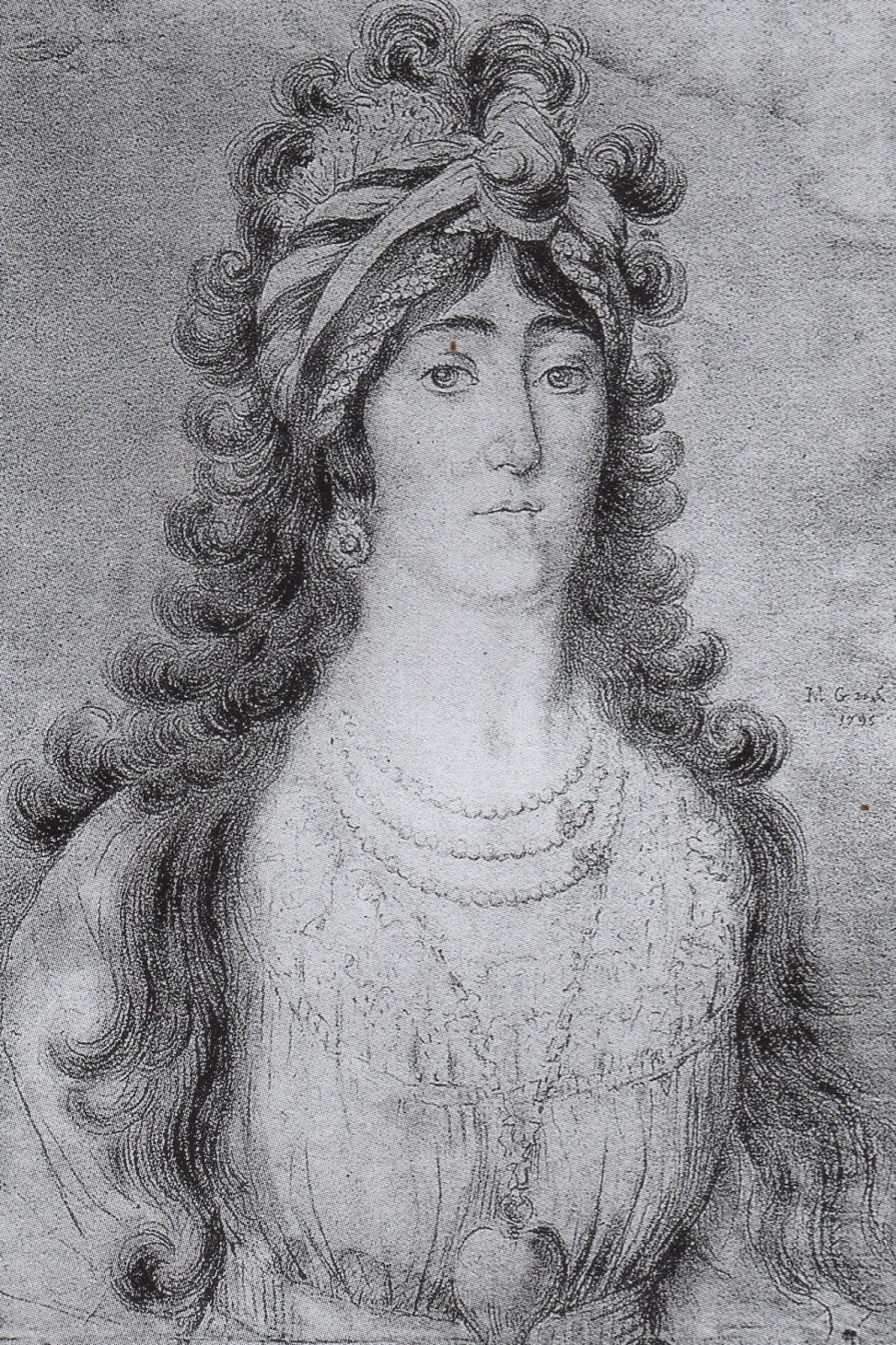
María Teresa Cayetana de Silva y Álvarez de Toledo, Duchess of Alba, drawn by Mariano González de Sepúlveda.

María Teresa, as she was called in her family, became the 13th Duchess of Alba in 1776 after inheriting the title from her paternal grandfather, Fernando de Silva, 12th Duke of Alba, who outlived her father. Her marriage the year before to José Álvarez de Toledo Osorio, 11th Marquess of Villafranca (a male-line descendant of Fadrique Álvarez de Toledo, 2nd Duke of Alba), made her and her husband the wealthiest couple in the Kingdom of Spain. Their only rivals to this status were the House of Osuna.

The duchess' relationship with famed Spanish painter Francisco de Goya and her somewhat eccentric personality have contributed greatly to a continuing interest in her life during the two centuries since her death. Goya executed several well-known portraits of the duchess, most of them during his stay at Sanlúcar de Barrameda (one of the Andalusian country seats of the House of Medina Sidonia) shortly after the death in 1796 of her husband, who was also the 15th Duke of Medina Sidonia.

Goya's accompaniment of the recently widowed duchess, combined with certain innuendo expressed in his portraits of her, have exacerbated rumors that the two were lovers. Although this has never been confirmed, the large number of portraits that the artist painted of the duchess suggests, at the very least, a close platonic relationship between the two.

The painting La maja desnuda, executed between 1797 and 1800 by Goya, has also been rumored to portray her. The painting, considered scandalous by Spanish society of the time, depicts a fully nude reclining woman. It, together with a companion piece depicting the same model clothed (La maja vestida), was commissioned by Spanish prime minister Manuel Godoy (the known lover of Spain's queen, María Luisa).

The true identity of the majas is uncertain. Many art historians over the years have rejected the possibility that the painting depicts the duchess, including Australian art critic Robert Hughes in his 2003 biography, Goya. Those scholars believe that the painting depicts either Godoy's young mistress, Pepita Tudó, or an idealized composite of several different models.

== Full name with titles ==
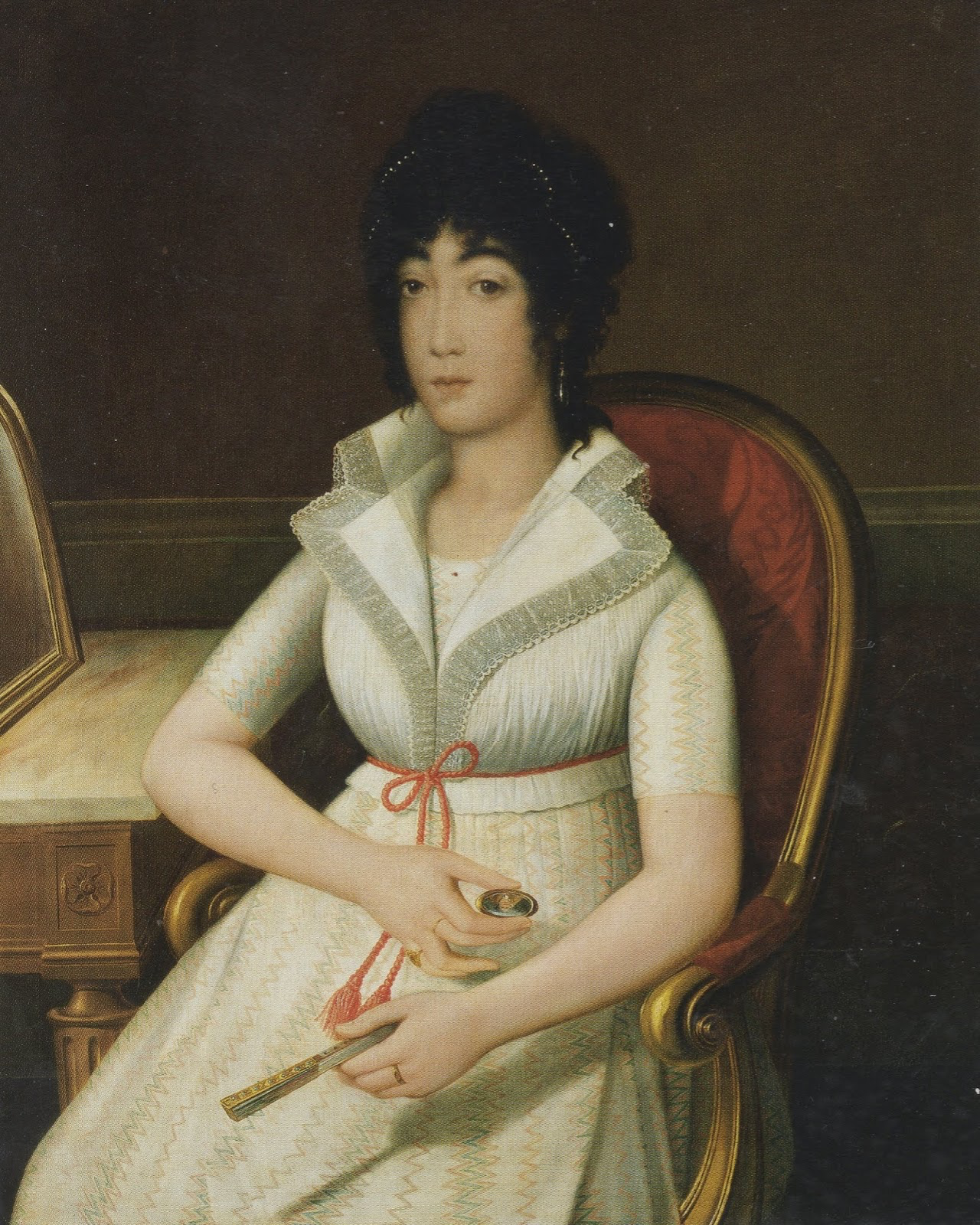
Portrait of María Teresa Cayetana de Silva y Álvarez de Toledo, 13th Duchess of Alba, attributed to the painter Joaquín Inza.

The Duchess's full name with titles in Spanish was Doña María del Pilar Teresa Cayetana de Silva Álvarez de Toledo y Silva Bazán, décimo tercera duquesa de Alba de Tormes, décima primera duquesa de Huéscar, sexta duquesa de Montoro, octava condesa-duquesa de Olivares, décimo primera marquesa del Carpio, décimo tercera marquesa de Coria, novena marquesa de Eliche, décimo segunda marquesa de Villanueva del Río, sexta marquesa de Tarazona, marquesa de Flechilla y Jarandilla, décimo primera condesa de Monterrey, décimo cuarta condesa de Lerín, décimo tercera condesa de Oropesa, décimo cuarta Condestablesa de Navarra, décimo segunda condesa de Galve, décimo cuarta condesa de Osorno, de jure duquesa de Galisteo, décimo primera condesa de Ayala, novena condesa de Fuentes de Valdepero, condesa de Alcaudete, condesa de Deleitosa, señora del estado de Valdecorneja, señora de las baronías de Dicastillo, San Martín, Curton y Guissens.

== Death and succession ==
The Duchess died under somewhat mysterious circumstances in July 1802 at the age of 40. Although her death was ostensibly due to tuberculosis and a fever, more colorful scenarios have been suggested over the years, among them a theory that she was poisoned. (This theory was dramatized in the film The Naked Maja.) She had no biological children, although she did have an adoptive daughter, known as María de la Luz.

After her death, the Alba ducal title passed to a relative, Carlos Miguel Fitz-James Stuart (1794–1835), who became the 14th Duke of Alba.

== Ancestry ==
Ancestors of María Teresa de Silva, 13th Duchess of Alba

16. Gregorio de Silva, 9th Duke of Infantado
8. Manuel José de Silva, 10th Count of Galve
17. María Mendez de Haro y Fernandez de Cordoba
4. Fernando de Silva, 12th Duke of Alba
18. Francisco Álvarez de Toledo, 10th Duke of Alba
9. María Teresa Álvarez de Toledo, 11th Duchess of Alba
19. Catalina Méndez de Haro, 8th Marquise of the Carpio
2. Francisco de Silva, 10th Duke of Huéscar
20. Manuel de Toledo y Portugal, 8th Count of Oropesa
10. Vicente Álvarez de Toledo, 9th Count of Oropesa
21. Isabel María Téllez-Girón
5. Ana María Bernarda Álvarez de Toledo y Fernández de Córdoba
22. Luis Fernández de Córdoba, 7th Marquis of Priego
11. Maria de la Encarnacion Fernández de Cordoba y de la Cerda
23. Feliche María de la Cerda y Aragón
1. María del Pilar de Silva, 13th Duchess of Alba
24. Pedro de Silva, 12th Count of Cifuentes
12. José de Silva y Fernández de Córdoba
25. Elena Fernández de Cordoba y Sfrondrati di Masibradi
6. Pedro de Silva-Bazán, 8th Marquis of Santa Cruz
26. Artal de Alagón, 5th Marquis of Villasor
13. Manuela de Alagón, 6th Marquise of Villasor
27. Ana María de Pimentel y Benavides de Bazán
3. Mariana de Silva-Bazán y Sarmiento
28. José Salvador Sarmiento y Zúñiga
14. José Sarmiento, 5th Count of Salvatierra
29. Maria Victoria Fernández de Velasco y Carvajal
7. María Cayetana Sarmiento, 4th Marquise of Arcicóllar
30. Francisco Melchor Dávila, 8th Marquis of Loriana
15. Leonor Dávila, 8th Marquise of Baides
31. Aloysia de Zúñiga, 6th Marquise of Baides

== Images by Francisco de Goya ==
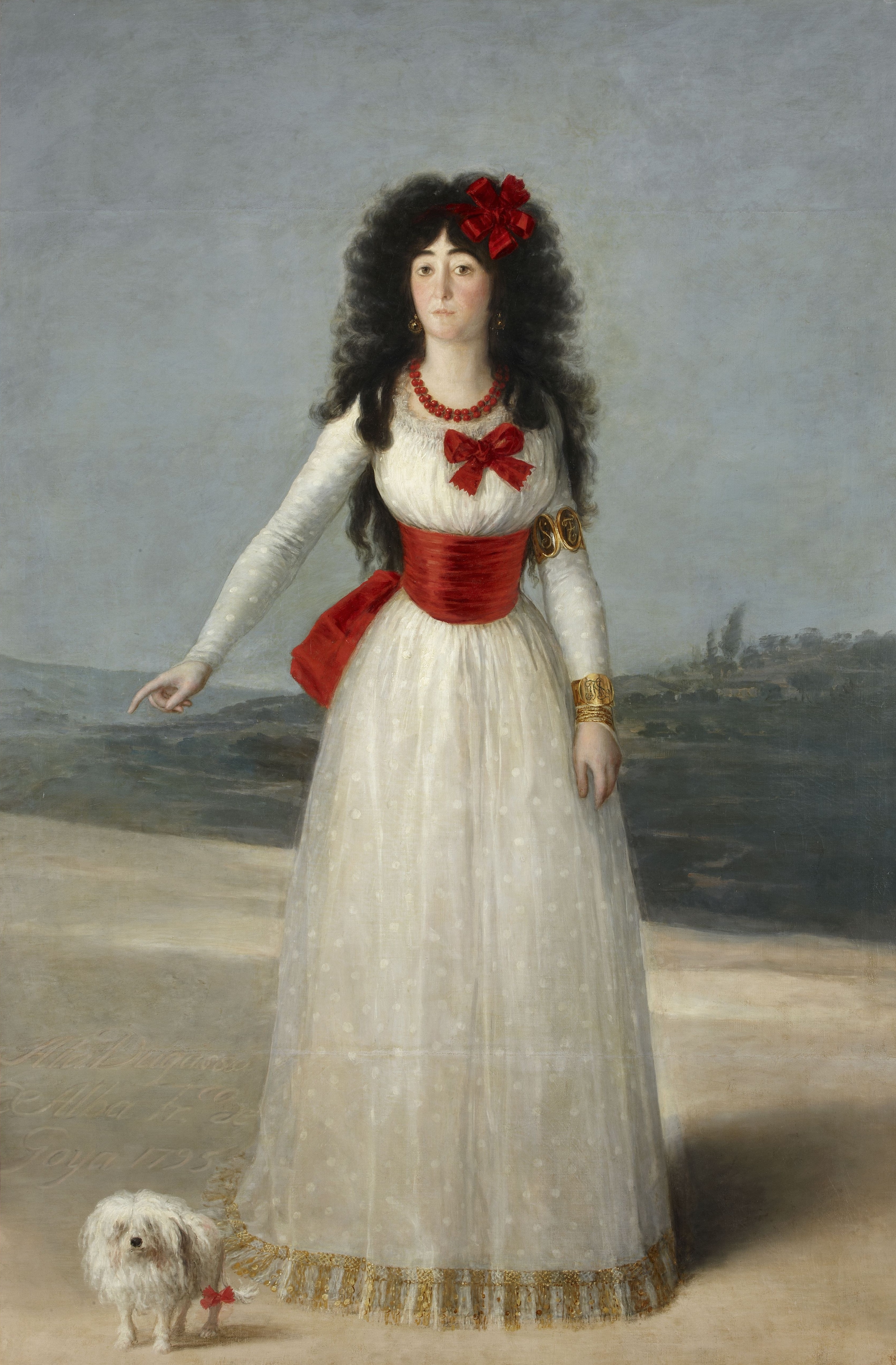
The White Duchess (1795)

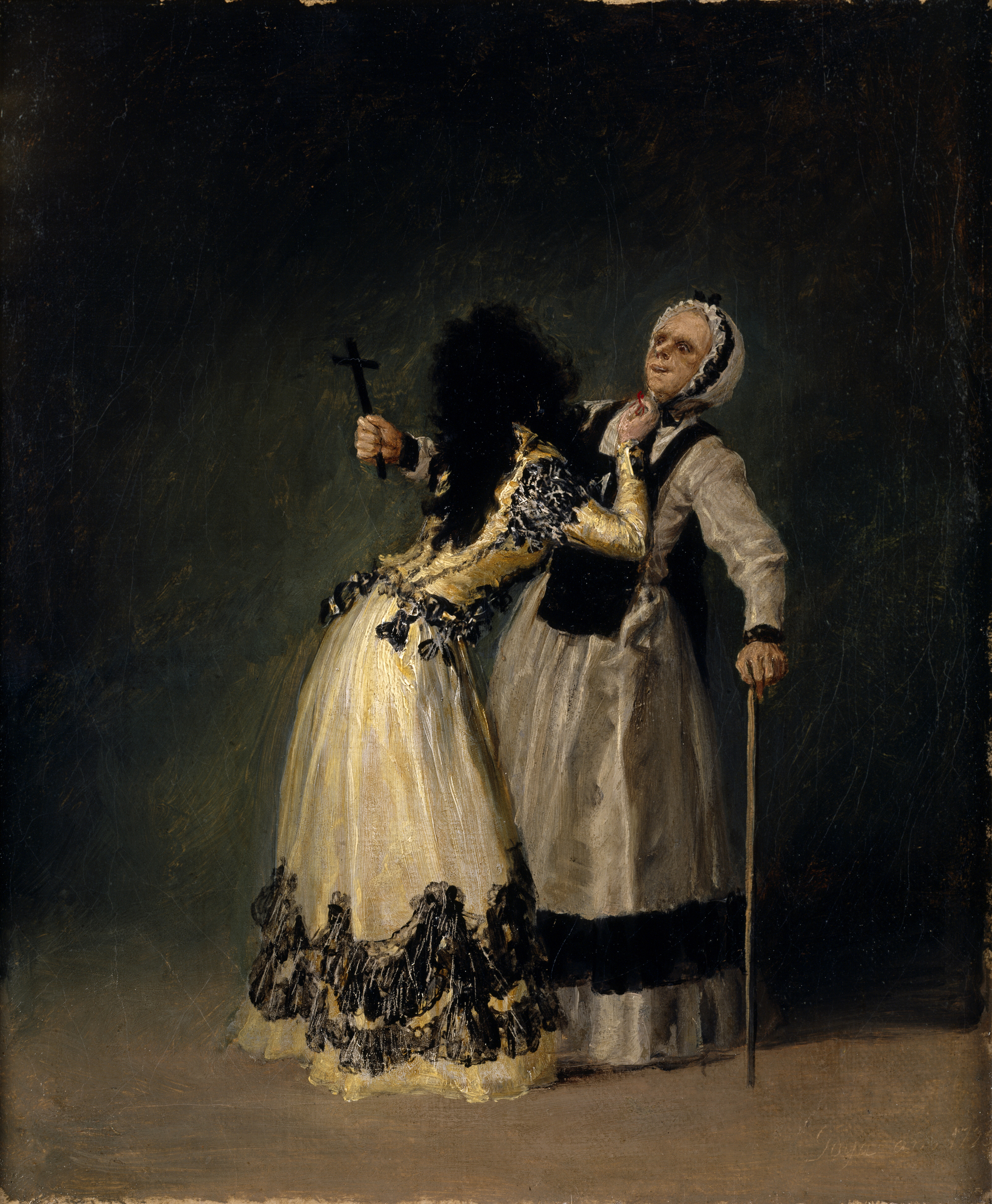
The Duchess of Alba and la Beata (1795)

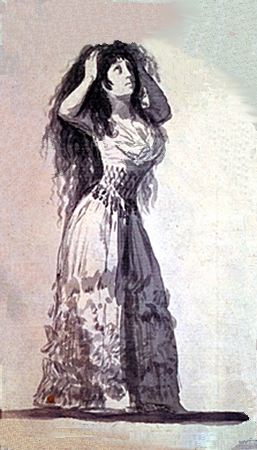
The Duchess of Alba Arranging her Hair (1796)

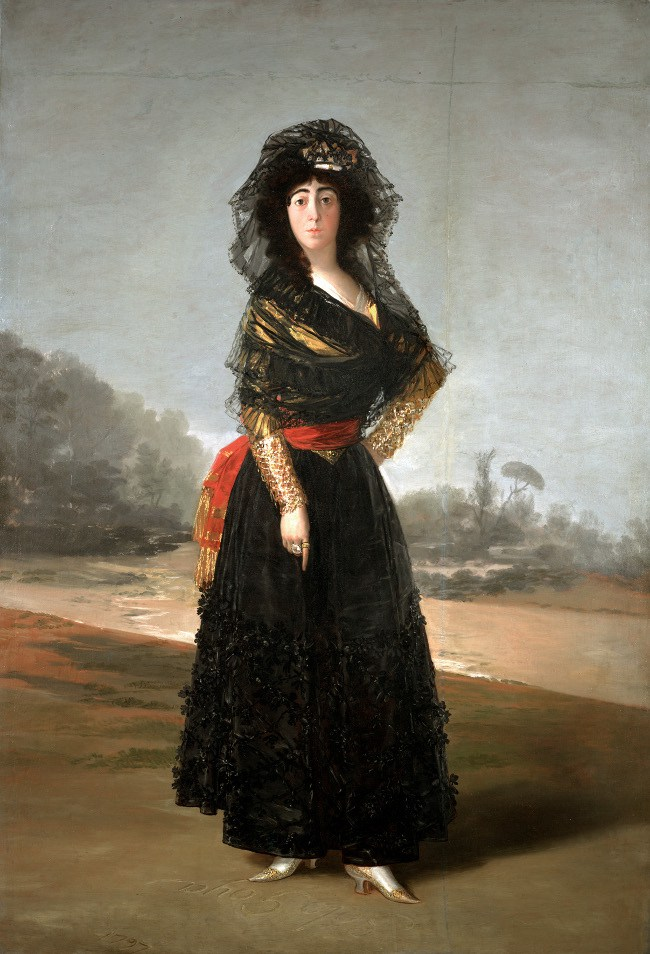
The Black Duchess (1797)

=== Doubted to represent the duchess ===
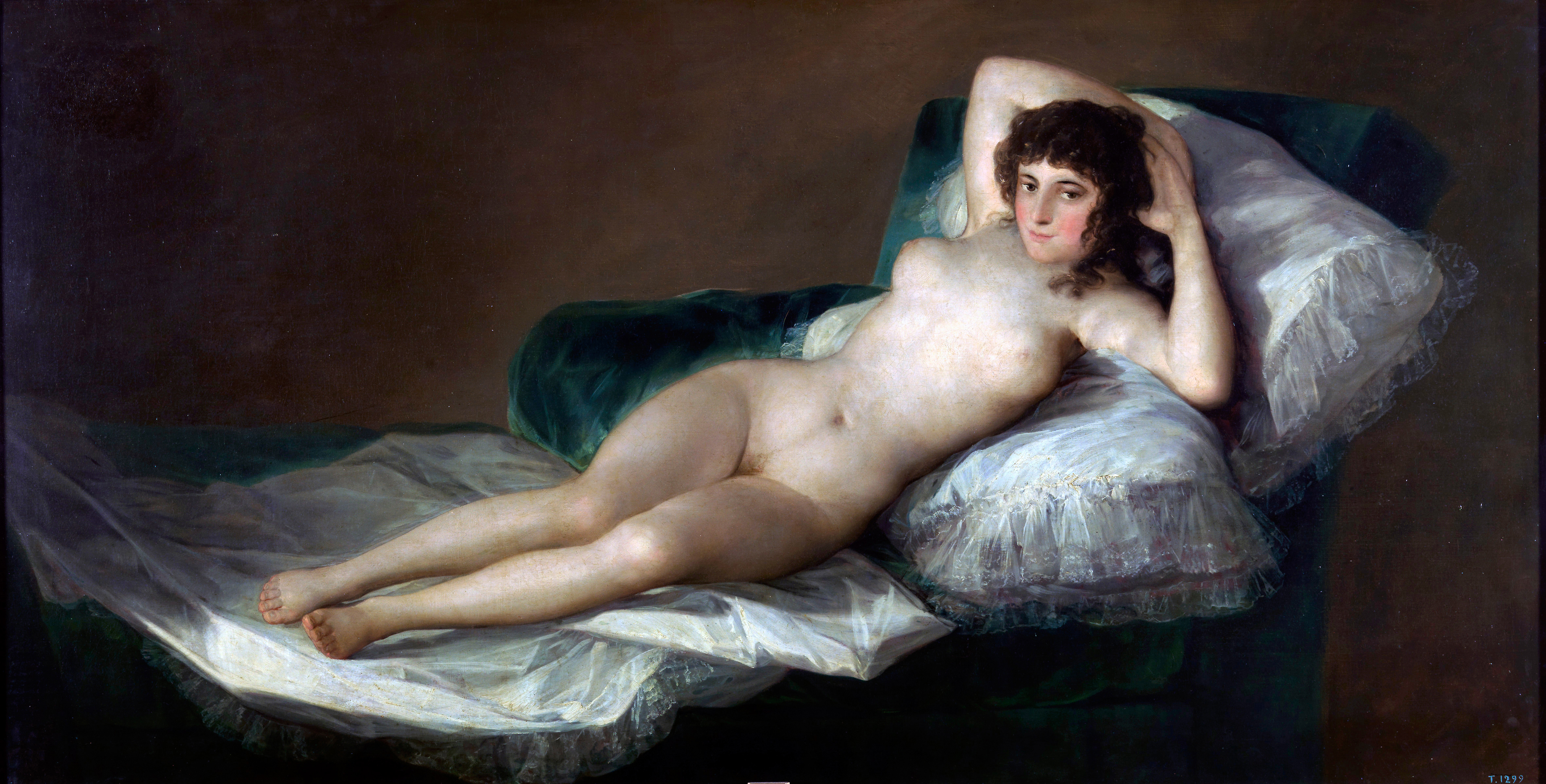
La maja desnuda

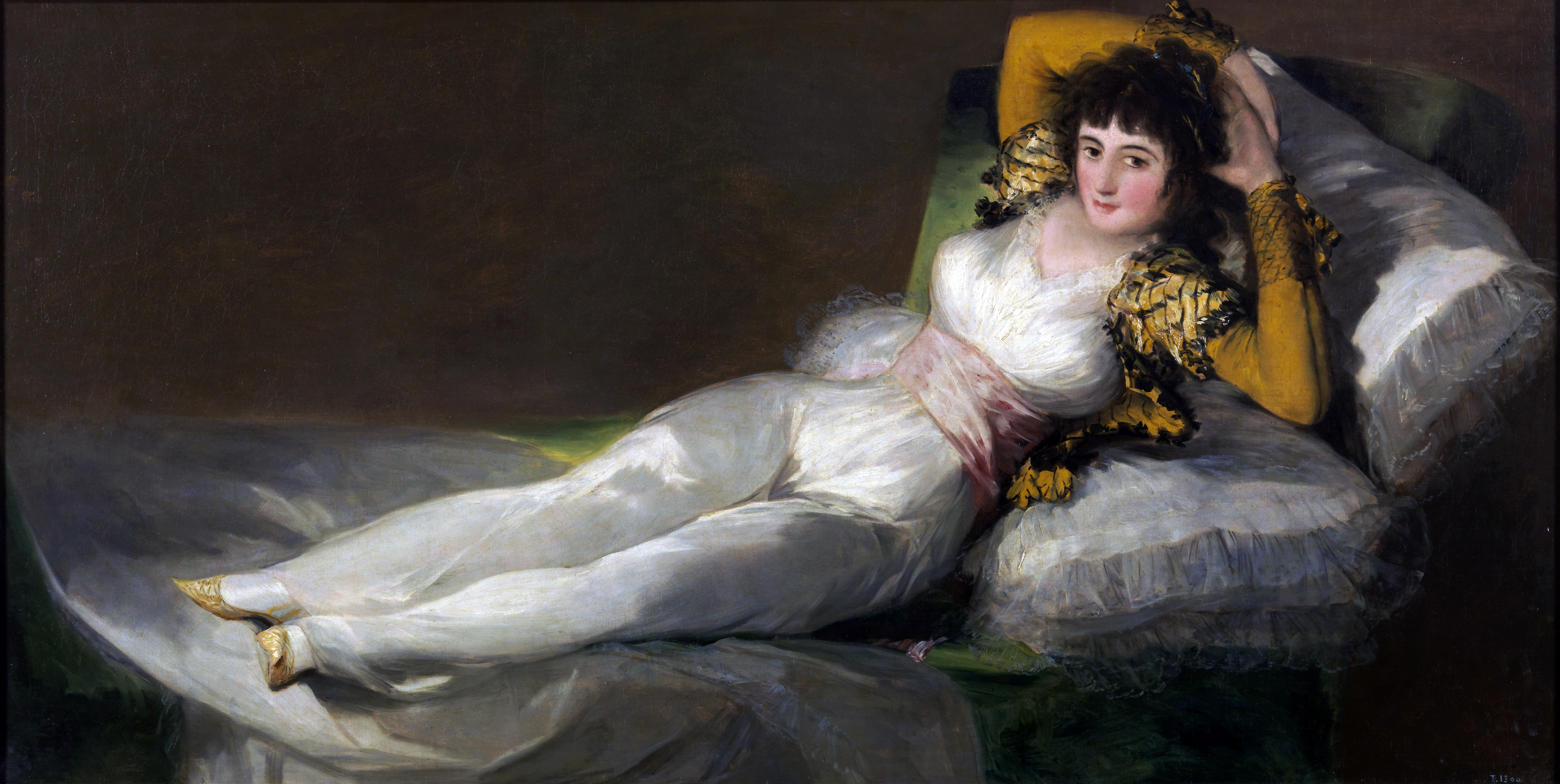
La maja vestida

== Sources ==
- Hobbs, Nicolas (2007). "Grandes de España" (in Spanish). Archived from the original on 2006-11-29.
- Instituto de Salazar y Castro. Elenco de Grandezas y Titulos Nobiliarios Españoles (in Spanish). periodic publication.

Spanish nobility
Preceded by Fernando de Silva	Duchess of Alba, et cetera 1776–1802	Succeeded by Carlos Fitz-James Stuart
Preceded by Fernando de Silva	Duchess of Huéscar; 1770–1776	Succeeded by Carlos Fitz-James Stuart
Italian nobility
Preceded by Fernando de Silva	Countess of Modica; 1776–1802	Succeeded by Carlos Fitz-James Stuart
