= The Black Duchess =

Painting by Francisco de Goya

Portrait of the Duchess of Alba
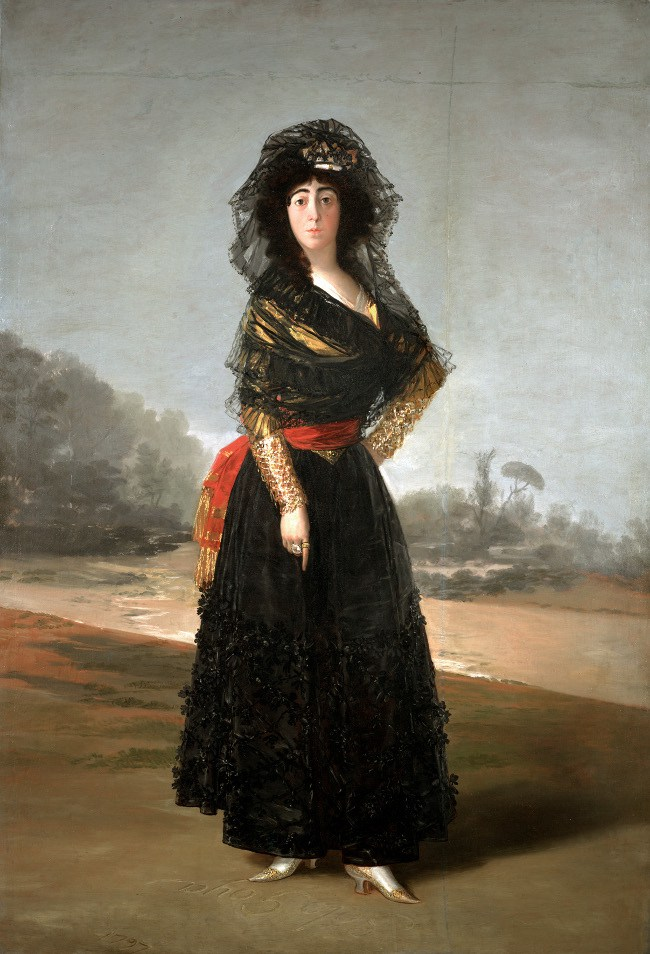
- Artist: Francisco Goya
- Year: 1797
- Type: oil-on-canvas
- Dimensions: 194 cm × 130 cm (76.5 in × 51.25 in)
- Location: Hispanic Society of America; New York

The Black Duchess (also Mourning Portrait of the Duchess of Alba or simply Portrait of the Duchess of Alba) is a 1797 oil-on-canvas painting by Spanish painter Francisco Goya. The subject of the painting is María Cayetana de Silva, 13th Duchess of Alba, then 35 years old. It is a companion piece to the more chaste The White Duchess, completed two years earlier.

The painting is part of the collection of the Hispanic Society of America in New York.

== About ==
The Portrait of the Duchess of Alba was painted in 1797 by Spanish painter Francisco José de Goya y Lucientes. It is among a number of works by Goya representing María Cayetana de Silva, 13th Duchess of Alba (Note: Full name: Spanish: Doña María del Pilar Teresa Cayetana de Silva Álvarez de Toledo y Silva Bazán, décimo tercera duquesa de Alba de Tormes, décima primera duquesa de Huéscar, sexta duquesa de Montoro, octava condesa-duquesa de Olivares, décimo primera marquesa del Carpio, décimo tercera marquesa de Coria, novena marquesa de Eliche, décimo segunda marquesa de Villanueva del Río, sexta marquesa de Tarazona, marquesa de Flechilla y Jarandilla, décimo primera condesa de Monterrey, décimo cuarta condesa de Lerín, décimo tercera condesa de Oropesa, décimo cuarta Condestablesa de Navarra, décimo segunda condesa de Galve, décimo cuarta condesa de Osorno, de jure duquesa de Galisteo, décimo primera condesa de Ayala, novena condesa de Fuentes de Valdepero, condesa de Alcaudete, condesa de Deleitosa, señora del estado de Valdecorneja, señora de las baronías de Dicastillo, San Martín, Curton y Guissens). At the time the work was created, she was thirty-five years old. She is pointing to the ground, where the words "solo Goya" are lightly engraved. She is wearing two rings, one engraved with the word "Alba", the other engraved with "Goya". The word "solo" was initially hidden, but after the painting was restored, it was revealed.

Her husband, José died in 1796. She retreated to an estate in Andalusia for a period of mourning. Goya followed and created numerous paintings and sketches of the duchess during her stay. There is an anecdote that one day, the duchess walked into Goya's studio and requested that he put on the duchess' makeup, then create a painting for her, which he did.

== Clothing ==
The Duchess' choice of black for her mantilla and skirt reflects the fact that she was in mourning for her husband. She is dressed in maja style associated with lower social classes. She may have agreed to this depiction in the expectation that it would show her as a "woman of the people". However, the background appears to show one of the Alba estates, reflecting her status as a landowner.

== Ownership and public display ==
While the Black Duchess may have been done at the subject's request, at the time of her death it remained in the possession of the artist. It was sold by Goya's son Javier, and had various owners before being acquired in 1906 by Archer Milton Huntington and moved to the USA. It was presented to the Hispanic Society by Huntington in 1907.

In the 21st century, highlights from the Hispanic Society's collection were lent to other institutions while the Society adapted part of the Audubon Terrace complex, which had been vacated by the Museum of the American Indian. In 2023 the painting, along with other items from the collection, was shown at the Royal Academy, London.

== Media Portrayals ==
The film Goya en Burdeos (1999) explores the painter's relationship with the Duchess. The film won Pierre-Louis Thévenet the Goya Award for Best Art Direction at the 14th Goya Awards. It references various works by Goya. There is a scene in which the Duchess, played by Maribel Verdú, is painted in a pose reminiscent of the Black Duchess, her costume featuring a black mantilla. In another scene, she appears nude in a pose reminiscent of La maja desnuda. While a number of people, including Carlos Saura, the film's director and writer, have made the assumption that the Goya and the Duchess were lovers, the opinion that she was the model for La maja desnuda is a minority one. An alternative candidate is Pepita Tudó, who was portrayed by Penélope Cruz in another 1999 film Volavérunt.

== See also ==
- List of works by Francisco Goya
