= Donald Mackintosh (shooter) =

Australian sport shooter (1866–1951)

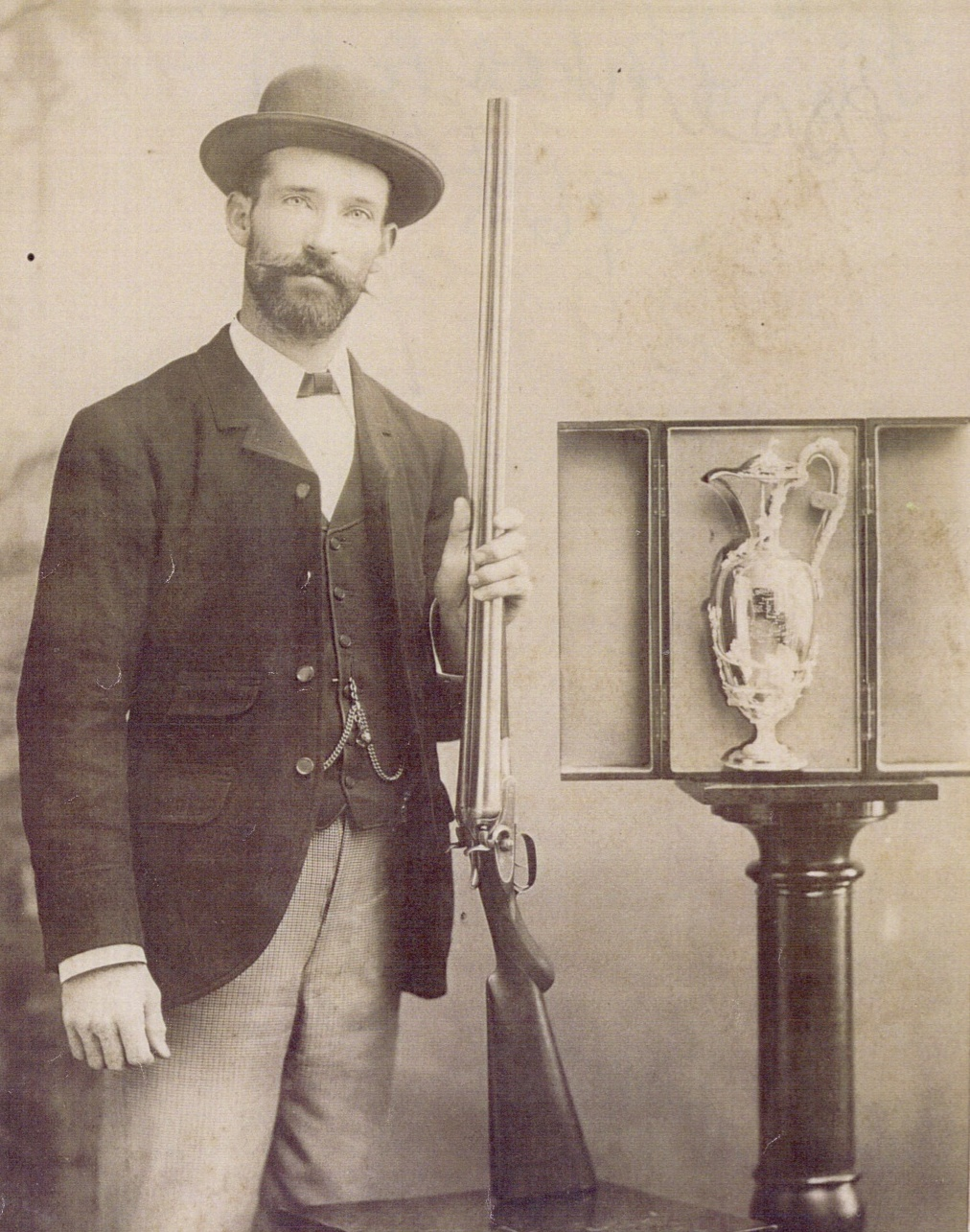

Personal information
- Full name: Donald Mackintosh
- Born: 22 September 1866 Rockbank, Victoria, Australia
- Died: 8 September 1951 (aged 84) Essendon, Victoria, Australia

Sport
- Sport: Shooting
- Events: Live pigeon shooting Trap shooting
Medal record
Representing Australia
Men's Shooting
Gold medal – first place	~~1900 Paris~~	~~Live pigeon shoot~~
Bronze medal – third place	~~1900 Paris~~	~~Live pigeon shoot~~

Donald Mackintosh (22 September 1866 – 8 September 1951) was an Australian professional sports shooter. He shot on the European live-bird pigeon shooting circuit between 1896 and 1908, winning numerous prizes and recognition as a world champion. In 1992, he was posthumously awarded Olympic gold and bronze medals for pigeon-shooting events deemed to form part of the 1900 Summer Olympics. However, the International Olympic Committee (IOC) later reversed its decision and reclassified the events as non-Olympic.

== Personal life ==
Mackintosh was born on 22 September 1866 in Rockbank, Victoria. He was the son of James and Isabella Mackintosh, who had immigrated to Australia from Scotland.

Mackintosh married Elizabeth Hartwell of Hobart on 6 October 1900. Their only son Donald James Roy Mackintosh was born in 1902, but died of measles in Menton, France, in December 1907.

Outside of shooting, Mackintosh enjoyed photography and poetry, writing verse under the pen name "The Rambler". Later in life he went blind in one eye, which was eventually removed and replaced with a glass eye. He died on 8 September 1951 in Essendon, Victoria, aged 84.

== Shooting career ==
=== Early career ===
As a young boy, Mackintosh learnt to shoot with an old muzzleloader, using it to hunt crows and rabbits with lead and black powder. At the age of 10 he joined the Bacchus Marsh Shooting Club, shooting his first competition in 1882. He joined the Melbourne Gun Club in 1889, and within six months had attained the maximum handicap of 30 yards (27 m), which he held for the rest of his career.

In 1890, Mackintosh won the Melbourne Gun Club £1000 Cup Handicap, killing 33 birds in a row. He also won the club's £50 Challenge Cup three years in a row. His success allowed him to earn a living as a professional shooter, and he travelled around Australia participating in competitions. Mackintosh participated in live bird shoots at least three days per week, and much of the rest of his time was spent hunting game, especially quail. He trained a pet fox as a retriever and developed an interest in taxidermy.

=== European circuit ===
Mackintosh left Australia in 1896 to travel on the more lucrative European shooting circuit, participating in tournaments in England, Belgium, France, Monaco, Spain and Italy. He won the London Gun Club Challenge Cup three times, the Grand Prix at Monte Carlo twice, the Belgian championships, and the grands prix of Italy, Aix-les-Bains, Milan, and Madrid. Mackintosh was widely regarded as a world champion, with the Paris sporting journal Jockey writing that "Mackintosh's performances at Monte Carlo, together with his records made in England and Australia, are such that, in a word, we declare him the champion of the world". He was said to have won 30 gold medals and over £20,000 in prize money, equivalent to approximately A$4 million in 2014.

==== 1900 Olympics ====
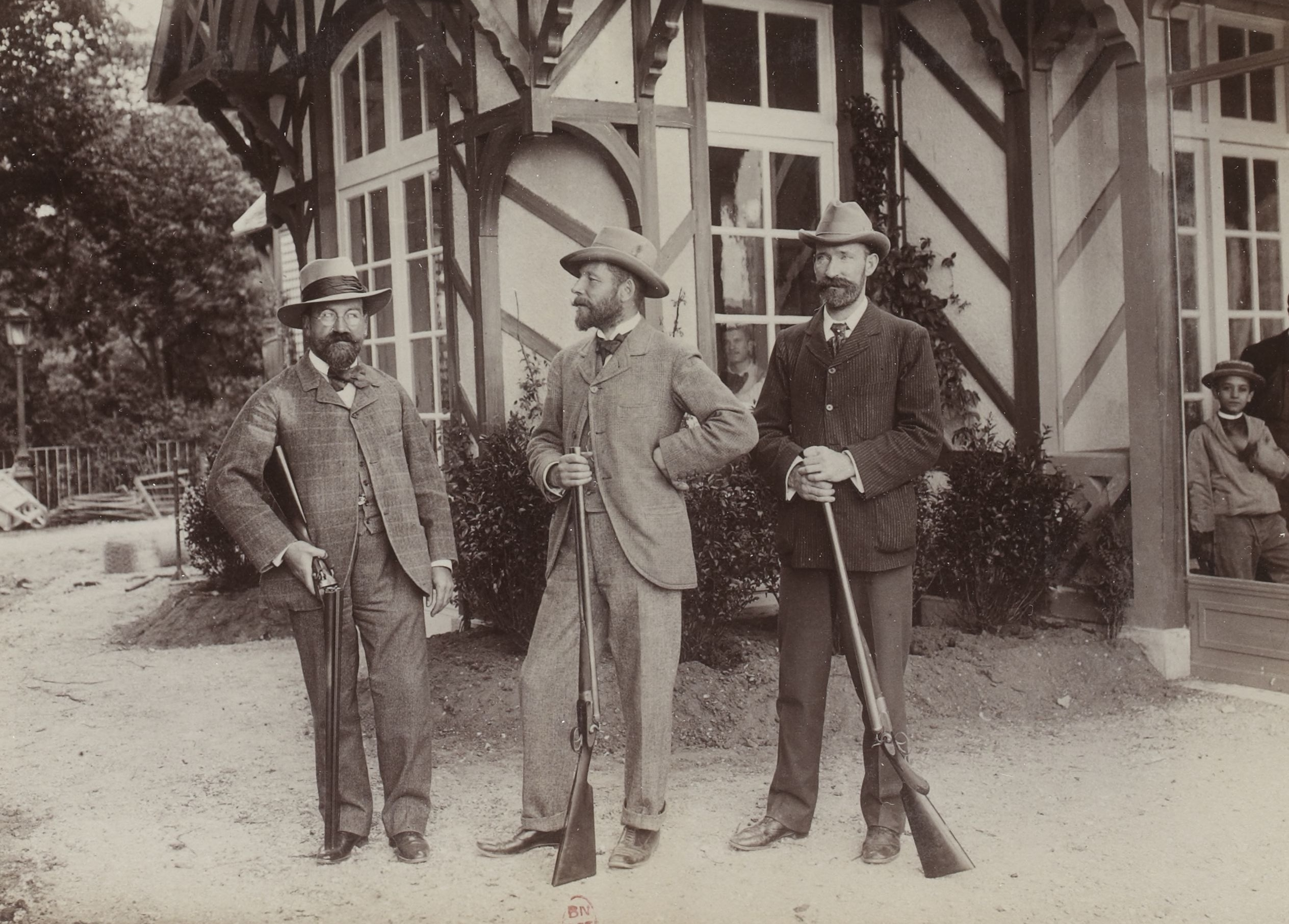
Contestants in the Grand Prix de l'Exposition of 1900, sometimes classed as part of the Olympics: Maurice Fauré (France, runner-up), Léon de Lunden (Belgium, champion), Mackintosh (Australia, tied for third)

Mackintosh has been cited by the Australian Olympic Committee (AOC) as one of three Australians who competed in the 1900 Summer Olympics in Paris, along with swimmer Frederick Lane and runner Stan Rowley. There was no official team or selection process, and each man raised their own funds to compete.

Mackintosh entered two live-pigeon shooting events at the 1900 Exposition Universelle in Paris, which was held simultaneously with the Olympics. These have been described by historian David Wallechinsky as "the only time in Olympic history when animals were killed on purpose". The first was the Grand Prix du Centenaire, which was held from 19 to 20 June and attracted 166 competitors. Mackintosh shot 22 birds in a row, one more than the Spanish runner-up; each shooter was eliminated after missing one bird. In the second event, the Grand Prix de l'Exposition held from 25 to 27 June, he tied for third place by shooting 18 consecutive pigeons, three behind the winner Léon de Lunden. When all but the last four shooters had been eliminated, the remaining competitors agreed to split the prize money equally between them. As a result, they each received 7,340 francs.

Mackintosh and the other pigeon-shooters did not regard themselves as Olympians, and he was initially omitted from Olympic reference works. In 1956, Hungarian historian Ferenc Mező was commissioned by the International Olympic Committee (IOC) to compile a comprehensive list of Olympic champions. Mező included Mackintosh as a gold medallist, but incorrectly listed the event as archery rather than shooting. This error was not brought to the attention of the IOC until 1987, when Australian historians Reet and Max Howell conducted further research. However, the IOC did not formally confirm Mackintosh as an Olympic gold medallist in shooting until 1992, following a visit from the AOC's official historian Harry Gordon to IOC headquarters.

In 2012, The Australian reported that the IOC had "quietly removed" Mackintosh from its list of Olympic medallists, without informing the AOC. This reclassification means that Patricia Dench is now officially regarded as Australia's first Olympic shooting medallist, for a bronze medal at the 1984 Summer Olympics.

=== Later years in Australia ===
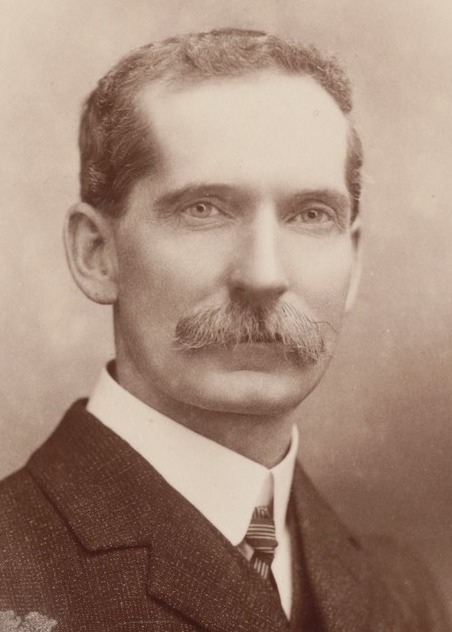
Mackintosh c. 1908

Mackintosh decided to retire from competitive shooting after his son's death in 1907. He and his wife left Italy in September 1908 and returned to Australia, where he opened his own gun shop. In 1922, Mackintosh participated in an exhibition of clay pigeon shooting in order to raise money for a library in Rockbank, his birthplace. He recorded a 100-break, the first Australian to do so with clay targets. He later became one of the founders of the Australian Clay Pigeon and Trap Shooting Association (ACPTSA), the predecessor of the current Australian Clay Target Association (ACTA). He served as the patron of ACPTSA from 1936 until his death.

In 1939, Mackintosh donated a trophy worth 100 guineas for an international trap tournament, to be contested between teams from Australia and the Home Nations. The Mackintosh Trophy is contested annually across four divisions and is now open to all Commonwealth countries. Mackintosh was posthumously inducted into the ACTA Hall of Fame in 2010, and into the Sport Australia Hall of Fame in 1987.
