= Safari jacket =

Hip-length, belted jacket with two sets of patch pockets and a notched collar

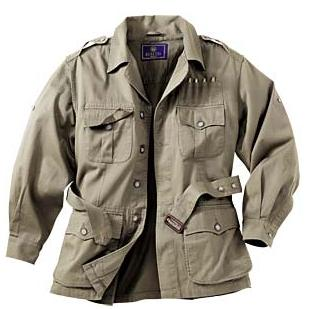
Safari jacket

A safari jacket or bush jacket is a garment traditionally made of khaki color lightweight cotton (drill or poplin) with a self-belt, epaulets, and four expandable bellows pockets. Also known as a sahariana, it was originally designed for going on safari in the African bush. When paired with matching trousers or shorts, it is a safari suit.

== History ==
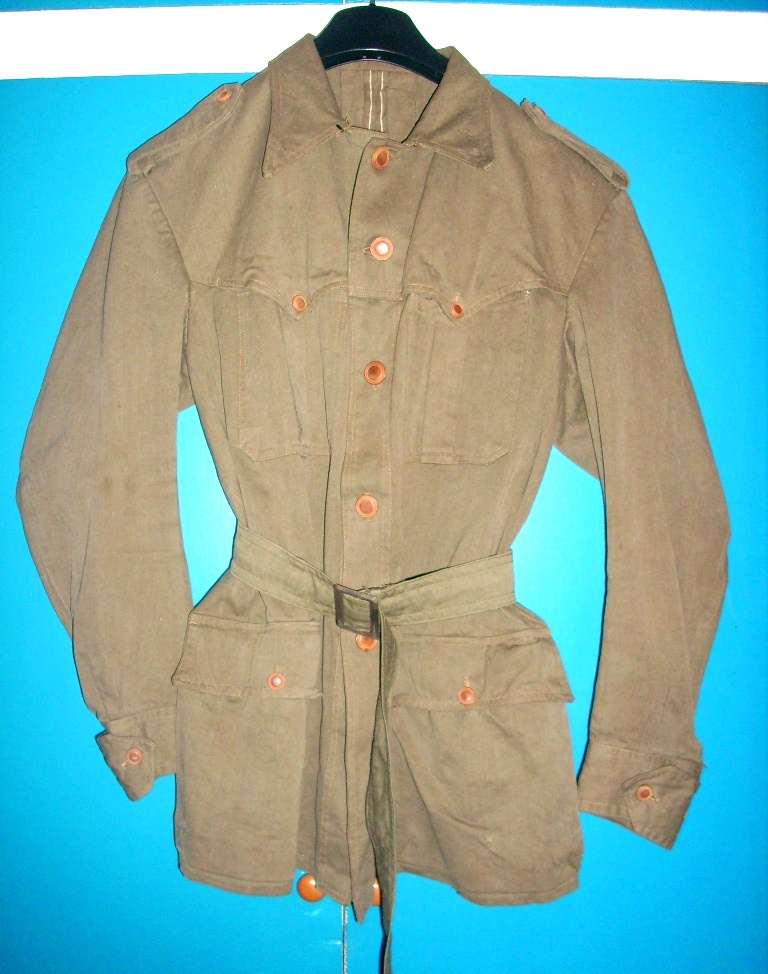
M. 1943 safari jacket (sahariana) of the Spanish Army in Spanish Sahara

Lightweight, light-coloured uniforms were worn by European soldiers serving in warm climates from the 19th century and, little altered, throughout World War II. They typically featured epaulettes, pleated pockets, belts and other features later found on safari jackets.

The earliest reference to a 'safari suit' listed in The Oxford English Dictionary is from an American newspaper in 1935. In 1936, author and adventurer Ernest Hemingway designed a 'bush jacket' which was made by Willis & Geiger Outfitters. In 1939, Abercrombie & Fitch advertised safari jackets, shorts and trousers, of 'coat shirt style' for sports and leisure wear.

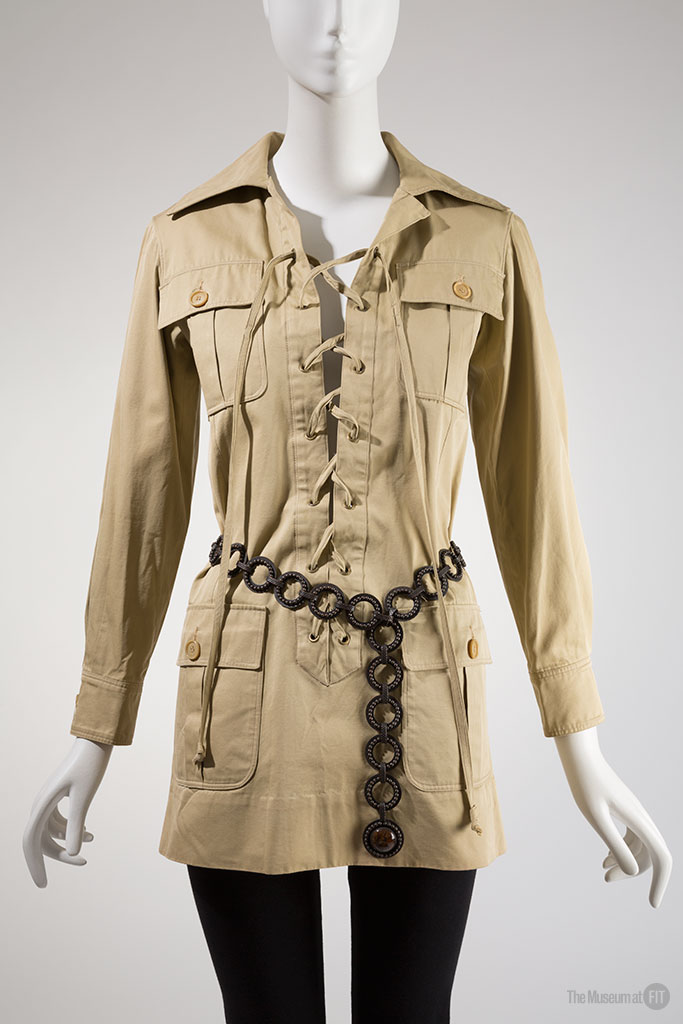
Yves Saint Laurent Rive Gauche "Safari" jacket (1968)

In the 1960s and 1970s, safari suits became fashionable thanks to designer versions for men and women by, for example, French designers Ted Lapidus and Yves Saint Laurent, both of whom are among those credited with inventing and popularising the look.

== Australia ==
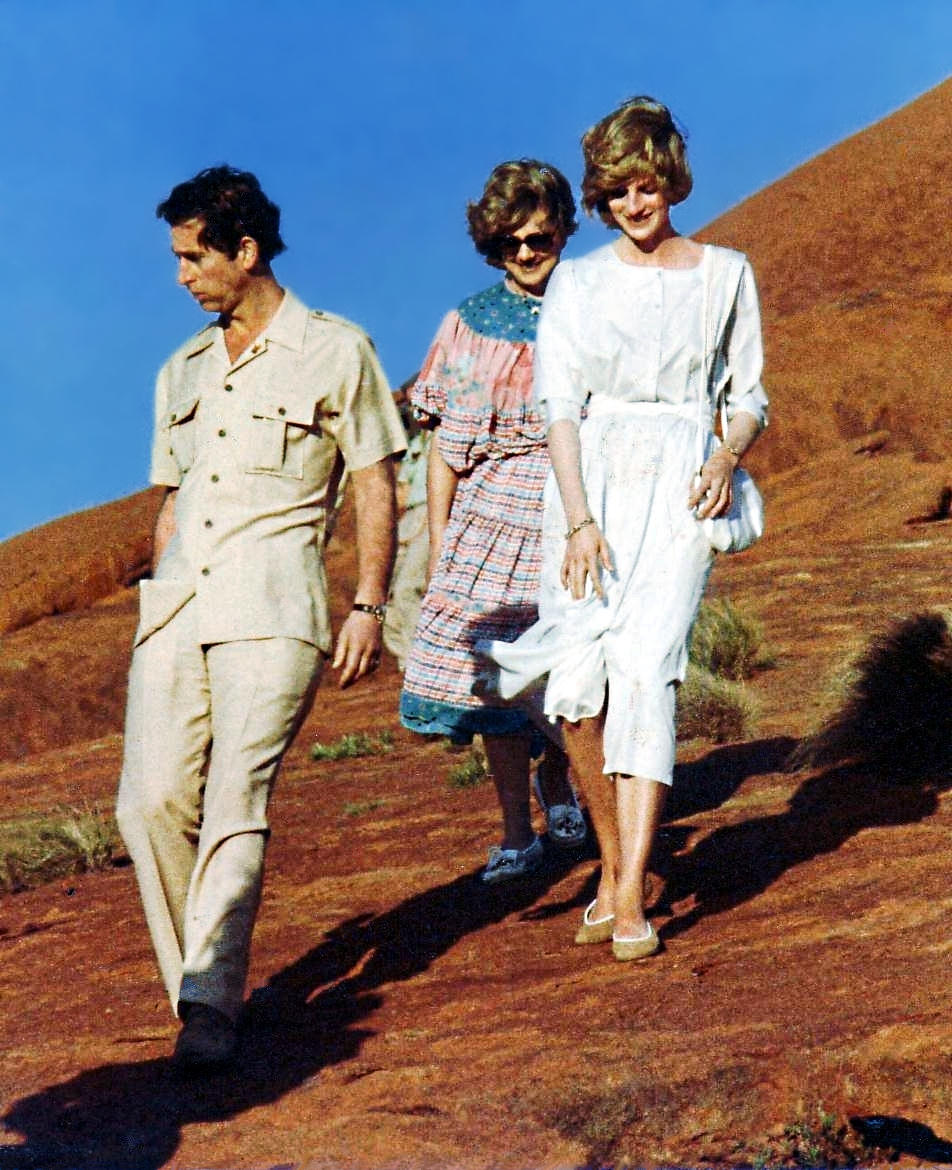
Charles and Diana visit Ayers Rock (Uluru), Australia, March 1983

The safari suit is popularly associated with Australian fashion in the 1970s. It was sometimes worn by the former South Australian Premier Don Dunstan.

On 7 March 1974, male politicians in the Northern Territory were given permission by the Speaker of the House Les MacFarlane to wear safari suits during sittings of the Northern Territory Legislative Assembly. It was granted at the request of the Leader of the Opposition, Mr Jon Isaacs. The Speaker of the House said:

Honourable members, I have received a further request that the standard of male dress be relaxed to include safari jackets. I have been in touch with the federal parliament and I find that the Speaker, Sir Billy Snedden, is allowing safari jackets with shirt and tie. He also allows one member to wear a safari jacket over an open-necked shirt. Therefore, I have decided to accept safari jackets as suitable dress in the Assembly. I must say that I do this very reluctantly because I feel that we have relaxed our standards too far. However, the precedent has been set. I might add that I will not allow T-shirts.

Charles, Prince of Wales famously wore a safari suit on his visit to Ayers Rock with Diana, Princess of Wales in 1983.

Decades after they had ceased being fashionable, then-father of the house Philip Ruddock wore a safari suit into the Australian House of Representatives during Question Time in 2015 as part of a charity drive.

== India ==
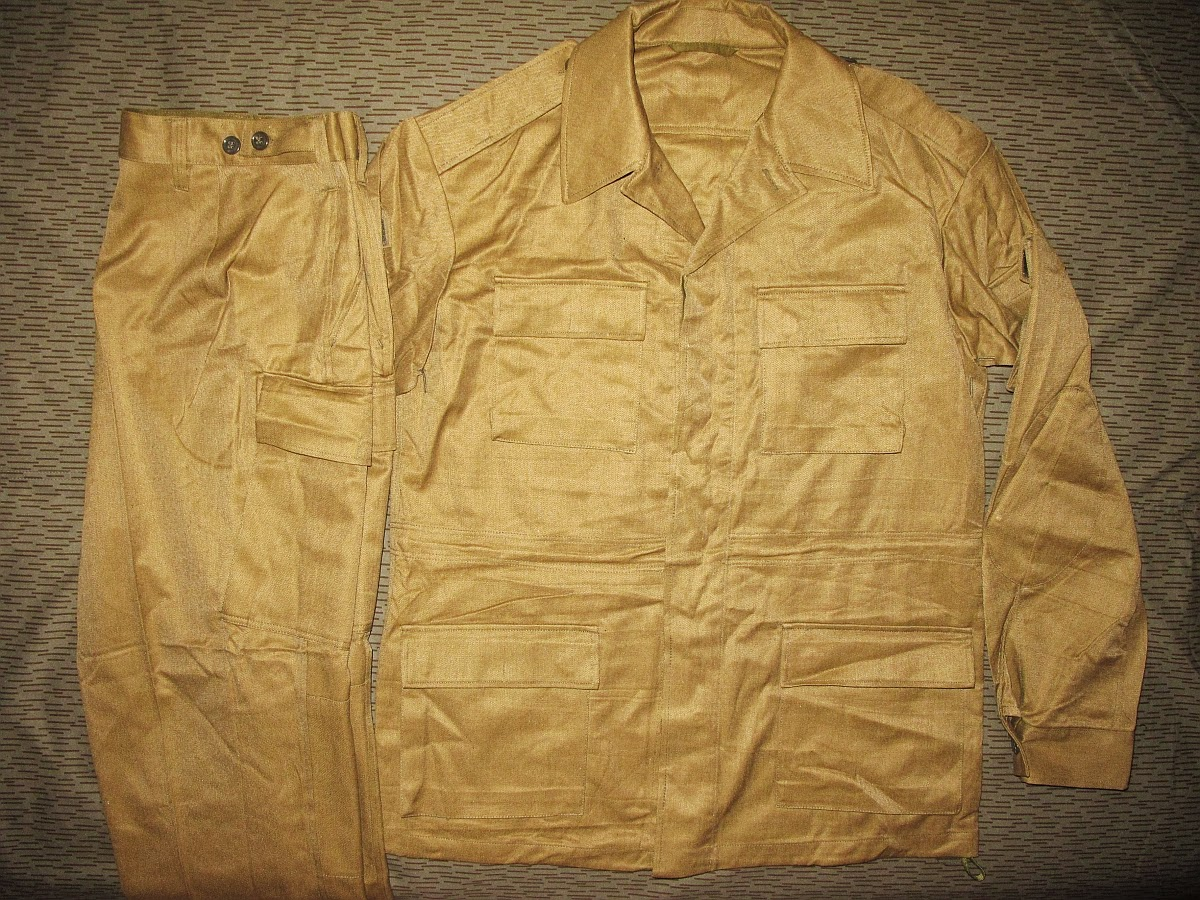
Soviet Summer M1988 Afghanka field uniform (safari suit).

In India, the safari suit gained popularity through the 1970s influenced to a large degree by films (James Bond/Roger Moore) and some fashion trends from the West for warmer climates. The safari suit in India gained prominence when local synthetic fibre manufacture and supply was significantly increased in the later half of the 1970s.

Reliance Industries and other textile manufacturers set up synthetic fibre plants in India significantly reducing the price of synthetic fibre and the Indian middle class jumped at the opportunity to be well dressed in a fabric which, though unsuited to India's climate was fairly cheap, easy to maintain and long-lasting. The safari suit continued to be the de facto business attire, particularly in government/public sectors and the SMB arena in India, through the late-1990s. With India's growth over the 1990s, liberalization and with the middle class suddenly having more disposable income, the younger generations began to gravitate towards more modern western fashions such as suits and other business attire. Although it is still visible in some parts of India, the Safari suit is now indelibly associated with the so-called License Raj—the slow, inefficient Indian bureaucracy of the 1970s and the 1980s.

== Revival ==
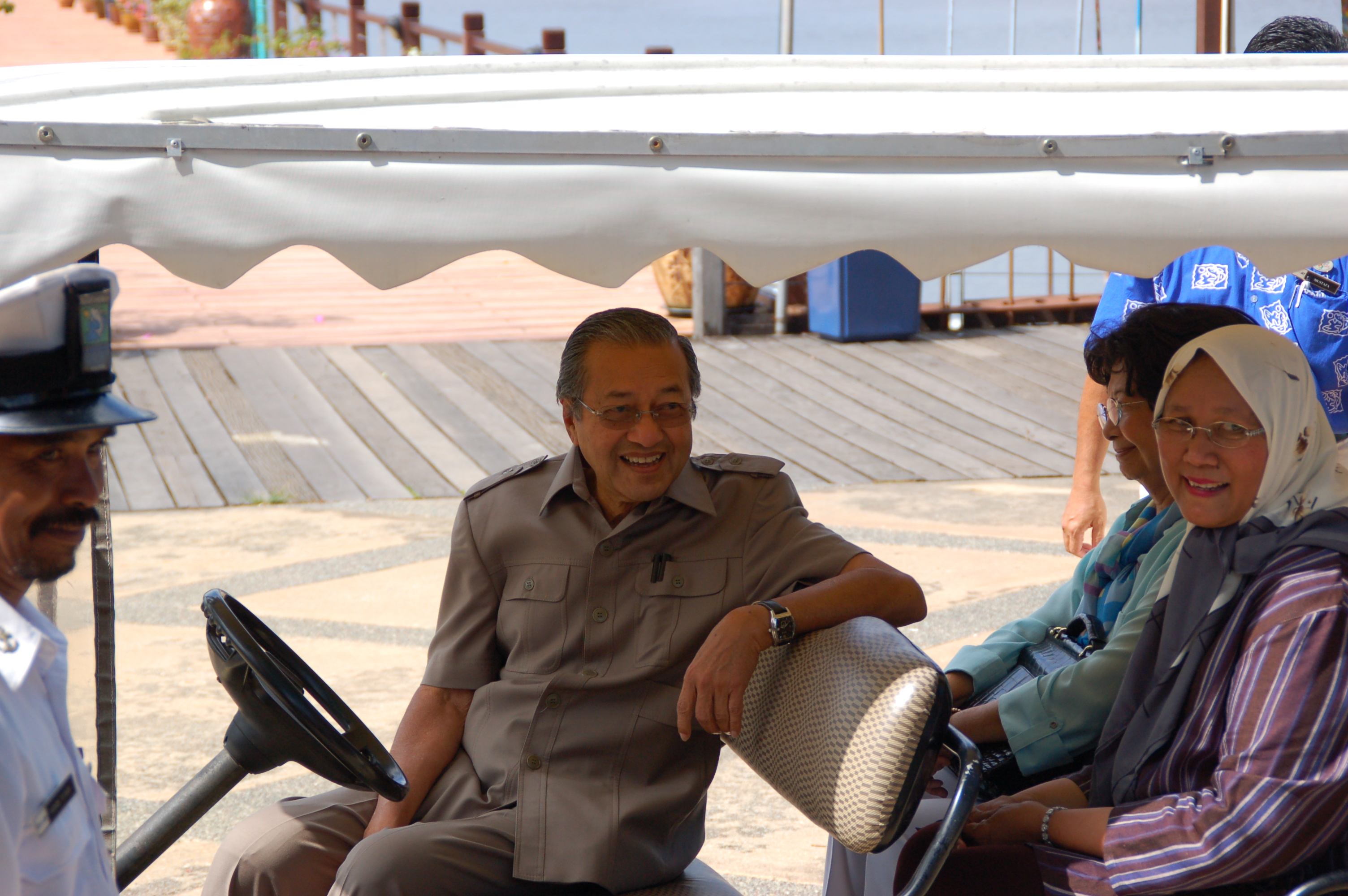
Former Malaysian Prime Minister Mahathir Mohamad is known for his safari suits

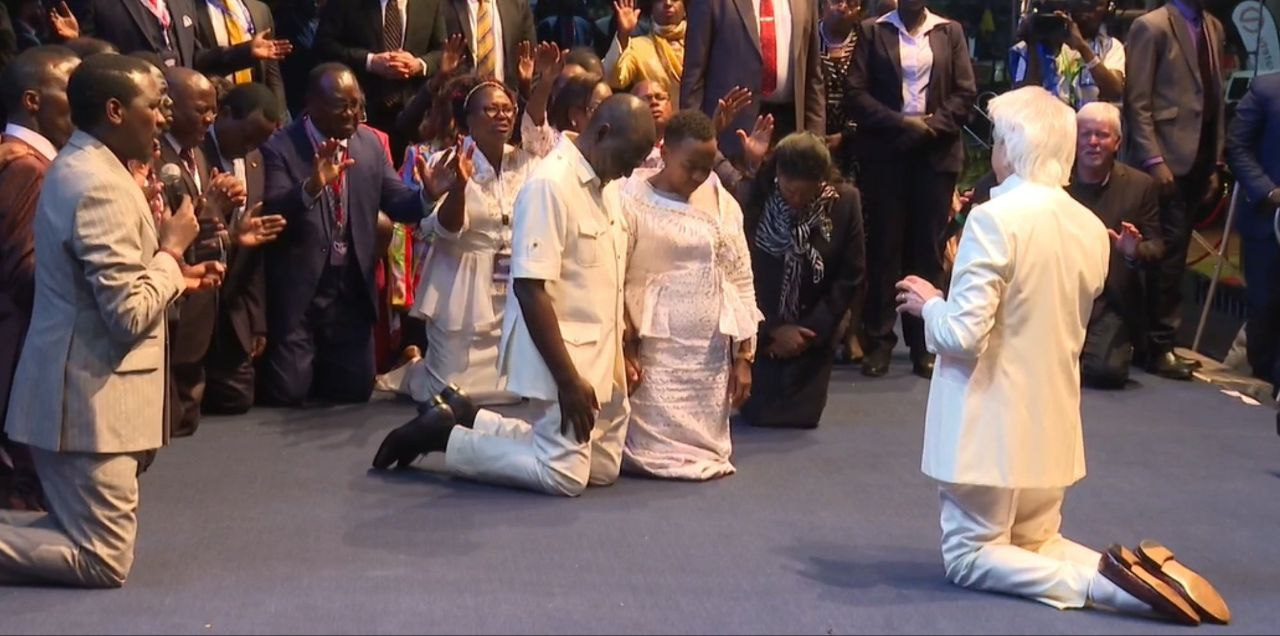
Kenyan President William Ruto is known for safari suits

Beginning in the mid 2010s, a variant of the bush jacket, known as a shirt jacket or shacket, underwent a revival in the UK and Europe due to the popularisation of vintage workwear by the hipster subculture. These were frequently made from blue denim, cambric, seersucker, heavy cotton in olive green or khaki, natural linen, or camouflage cloth, and featured patch pockets. Some had the epaulets, belt, and pocket flaps of the traditional safari jacket, while others did not.

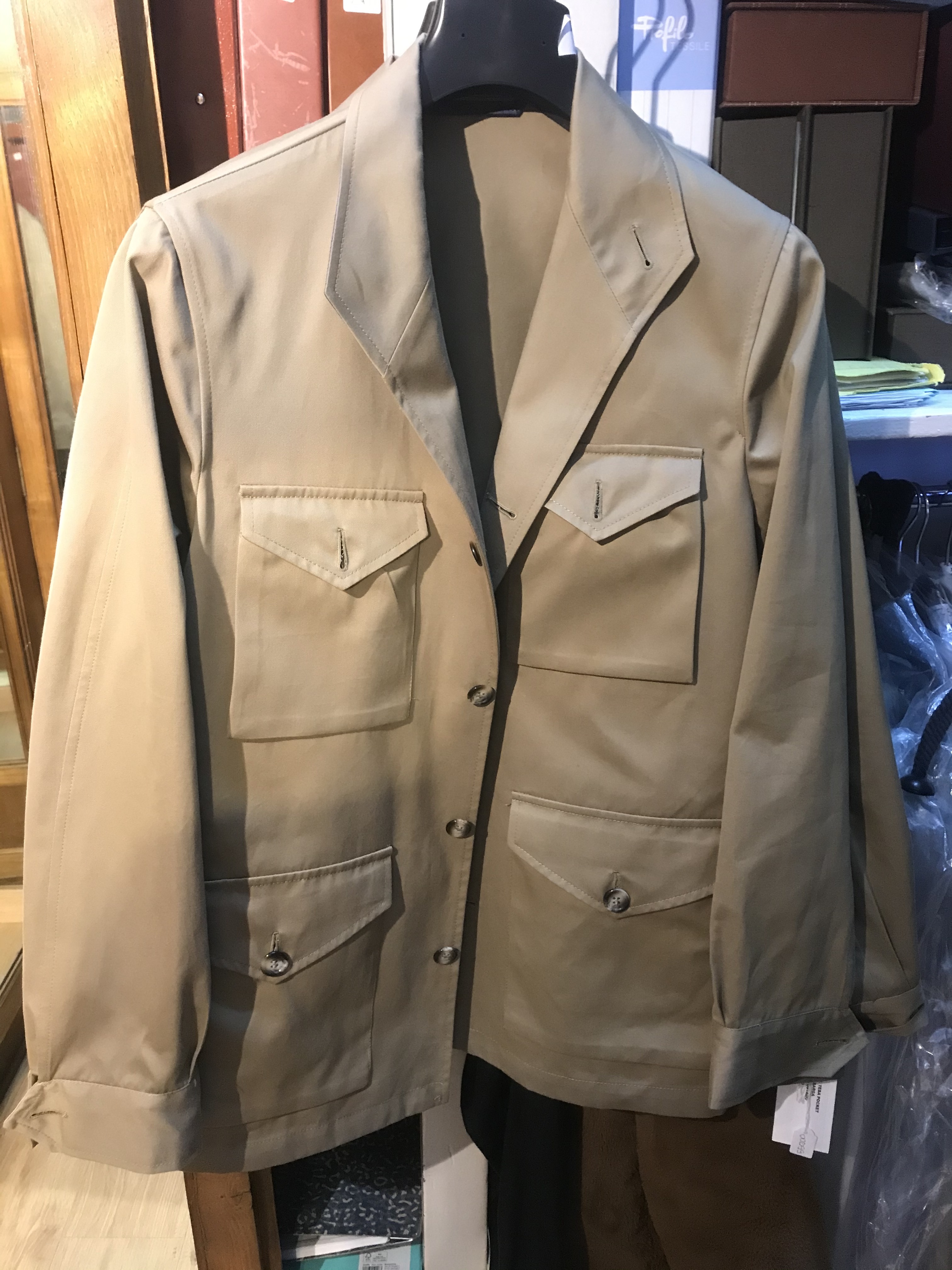
A modern Teba jacket-style sahariana by Camisería Burgos

== See also ==
- Guayabera
- Khaki drill
- Leisure suit
- Norfolk jacket
