= Jacob & Josef Kohn =

Austrian furniture maker and interior designer

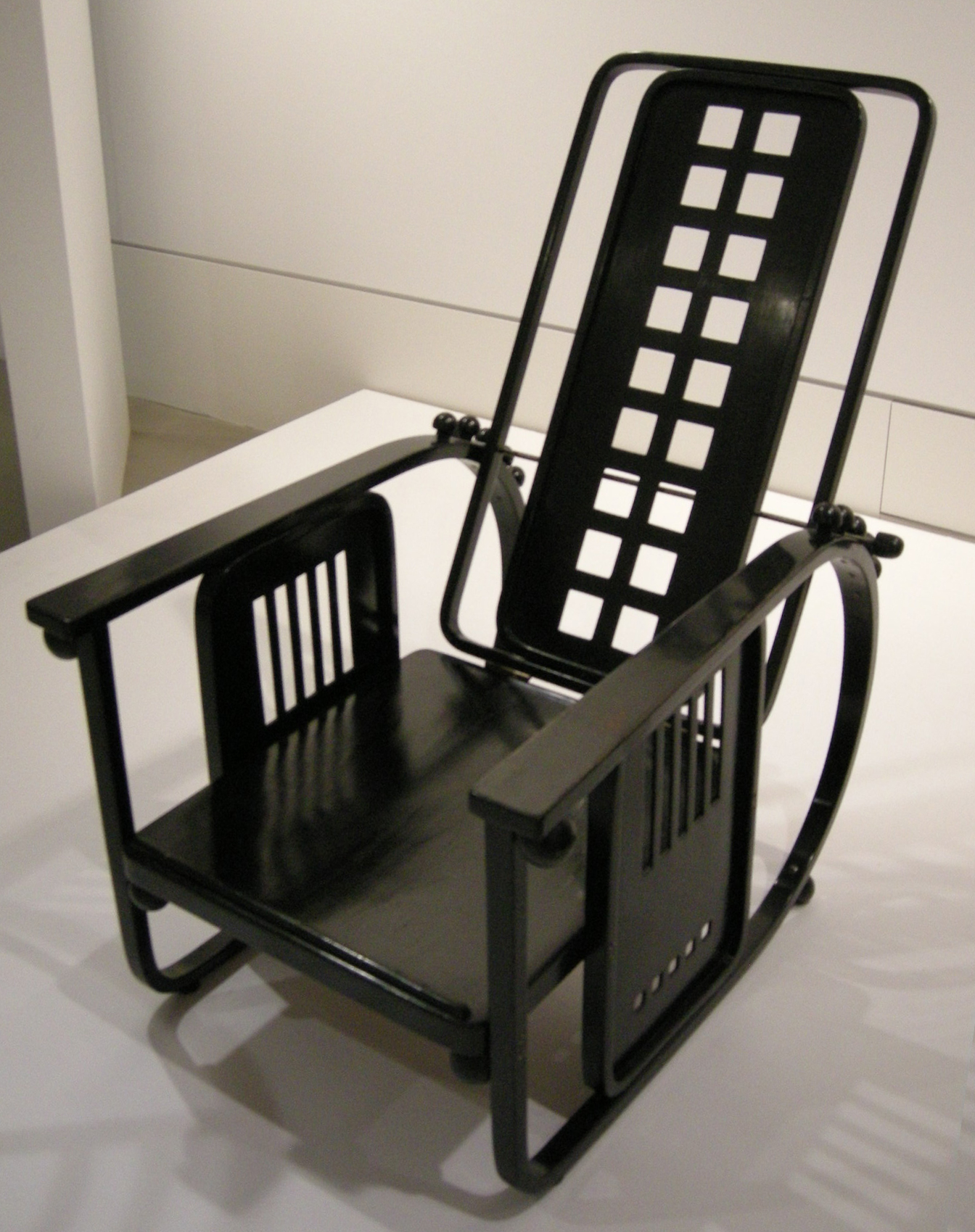
Adjustable-back chair (Sitzmachine) by Jacob & Josef Kohn, design by Josef Hoffmann, circa 1905

Jacob & Josef Kohn, also known as J. & J. Kohn, was an Austrian furniture maker and interior designer in Vienna.

Jacob Kohn (1791–1866) together with his son Josef Kohn (1814–1884) founded the enterprise in 1849. Kohn would later rise to become one of the leading furniture makers in Austria-Hungary, becoming one of the leading competitors of Gebrüder Thonet. Kohn worked together with artists of the Wiener Werkstätte and Josef Hoffmann in the design of many pieces.

Kohn merged with Mundus in 1914, which in turn merged with Gebrüder Thonet in 1921 to become the world’s largest furniture manufacturer.

The Kohns received many awards and prizes for their work. They received a Spanish Royal Warrant of Appointment as purveyors of the royal house (Proveedor de la Real Casa).

Kohn's works can be seen in a number of museum today, including the Museum of Modern Art in New York, the Museum of Applied Arts in Vienna and Disseny Hub Barcelona.

== Literature ==
- Üner, Stefan: Jacob & Josef Kohn, in: Wagner, Hoffmann, Loos und das Möbeldesign der Wiener Moderne. Künstler, Auftraggeber, Produzenten, ed. by Eva B. Ottillinger, Exhib. Cat. Hofmobiliendepot, Vienna, March 20 – October 7, 2018, p. 140–142, ISBN 978-3-205-20786-3.
- Jacob & Josef Kohn. Memorandum of the firm Jacob & Josef Kohn, Wsetin, (Austria, Moravia) for the centennial exhibition in Philadelphia 1876. Philadelphia Museum of Art. Museum Library.[NK2545 .K64m PDF].
- Gatsura, Genrih (Henry). Jacob & Josef Kohn furniture. "J. & J. Kohn" on the furniture market of imperial Russia. Illustrated history of Kohn furniture. Moscow, 2009. ISBN 5-7071-0372-4
- Giovanni Renzi. Il Mobile Moderno/The Modern Furniture - Gebruder Thonet Vienna Jacob & Josef Kohn, Silvana Editoriale, Milano, 2008 ISBN 978-88-366-1138-6
