= Teba (disambiguation) =

Teba is a municipality in Andalusia, Spain.

Teba may also refer to:

- Teba jacket, a soft, unpadded, single-breasted jacket.
- Teba, a supporting character from The Legend of Zelda video game series
- Teban Gardens, a place in Singapore
