= Patricia Dench =

Australian sport shooter (born 1932)

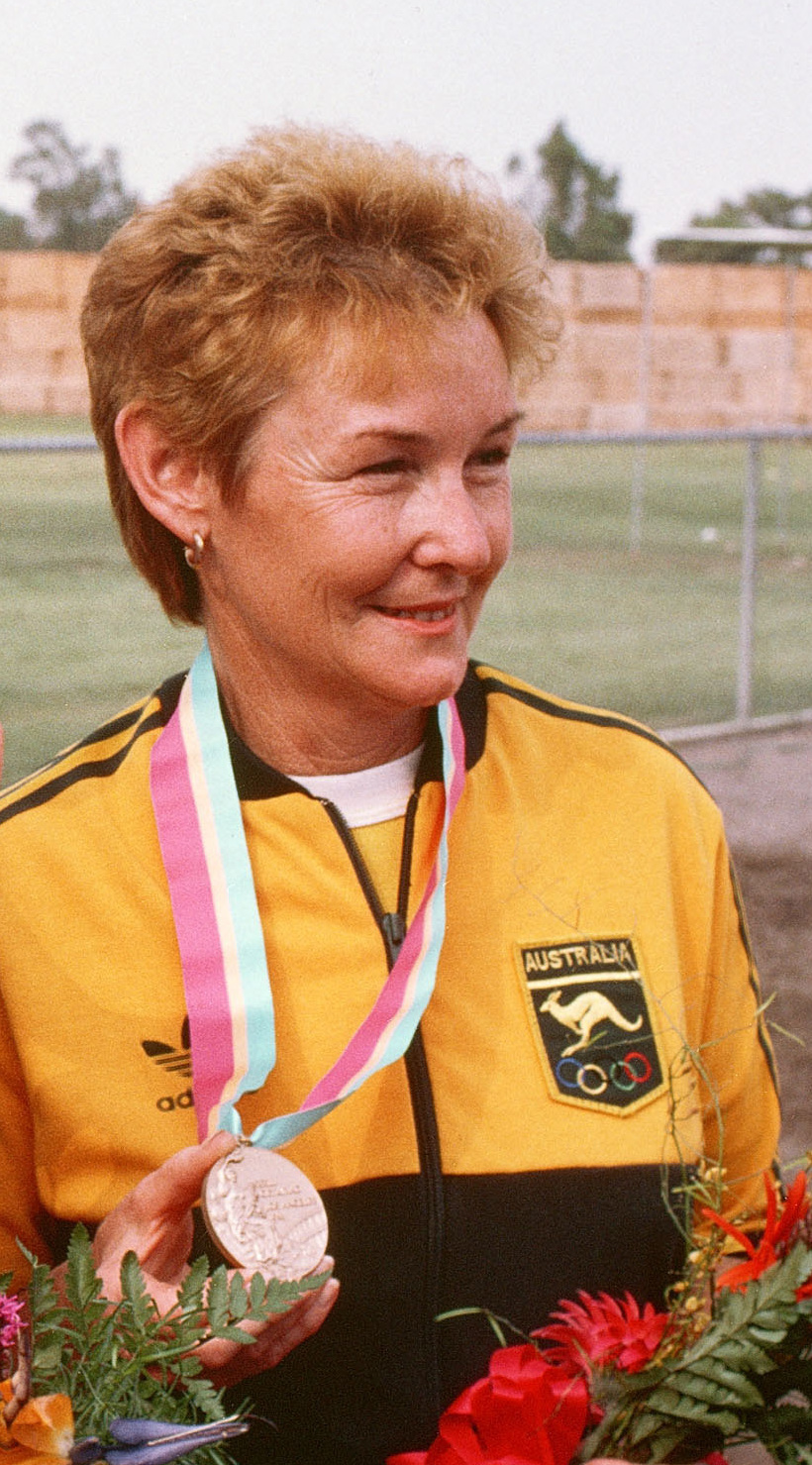

Personal information
- Nationality: Australian
- Born: 8 March 1932 (age 94)

Sport
- Sport: Sport shooting
Medal record
Women's shooting
Representing Australia
Olympic Games
Bronze medal – third place	1984 Los Angeles	25 m pistol

Patricia Dench (born 8 March 1932) is an Australian sport shooter. She won the bronze medal in the 25 m pistol in the 1984 Summer Olympics in Los Angeles.

Dench is regarded as Australia's first Olympic medallist in shooting. Previously Donald Mackintosh was considered the first, for his gold and bronze medals in pigeon shooting at the 1900 Paris Olympics. However, the International Olympic Committee (IOC) has since ruled that Mackintosh's events were non-Olympic.

She competed at the 1981 ISSF 10 meter air pistol, winning a silver medal.
