= Khaki drill =

Type of fabric and the military uniforms made of it

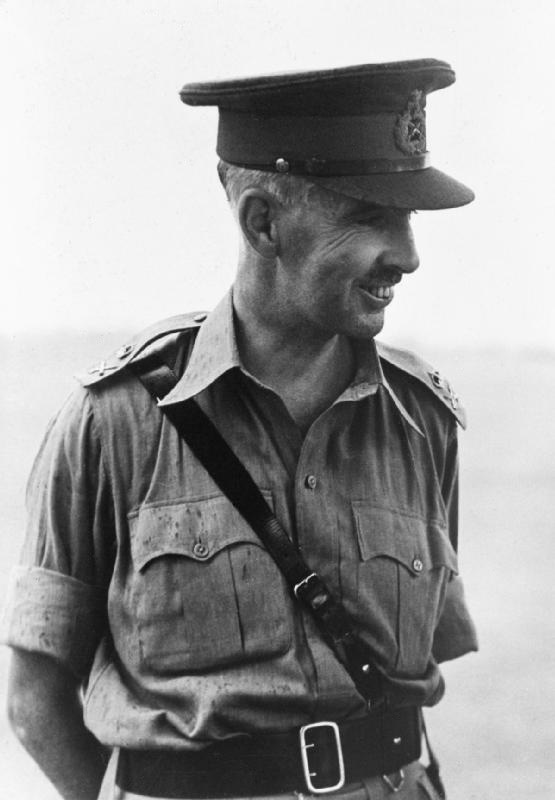
Lieutenant-General Arthur Percival, GOC of Malaya at the time of the Japanese invasion, wearing the officer's KD bush jacket

Khaki drill (KD) is the British military term for a type of cotton fabric and the military uniforms made from them.

== History ==
Khaki colour uniforms were first introduced in 1848 in the British Indian Army Corps of Guides. As well as the Corps of Guides, other regiments in India soon adopted the uniform and eventually it was used throughout the British military. A darker khaki serge Service Dress was adopted for wear in temperate areas. A lighter weight and lighter shaded ("sandy") khaki cotton uniform was worn in warmer areas (or in some garrisons, notably the Bermuda Garrison, over the warm and humid summers, while the serge uniform was worn during the rest of the year), and it is the light weight uniforms that came to be referred to as "khaki drills".

Khaki drill was worn as a combat uniform from 1900 to 1949 and was most often used in desert and tropical service. A variant, still referred to as khaki drill or KD, is worn by the British Armed Forces in non-combatant warm-weather countries where the British are actively serving (e.g. personnel stationed at RAF Akrotiri in Cyprus will wear any of four working variants of this uniform). Generally, KD was a series of different uniform patterns of light khaki cloth, generally cotton, first worn by British and British Empire soldiers in the Boer War. Canada developed its own pattern after the First World War, and the uniform was commonly worn in Canada, with officers again having the option of finer garments privately purchased. In the Second World War, Canadians serving in Jamaica and Hong Kong wore Canadian-pattern KD; the I Canadian Corps troops in Italy wore KD supplied in theatre by the British, generally of British, Indian, or US (War Aid) manufacture.

== North Africa and the Mediterranean ==
British troops training in Egypt with full KD dress, 1943

In the early part of the North African Campaign and the Mediterranean theatre, British troops were equipped with long-or-short sleeved Aertex-fabric shirts, with KD shorts or slacks on the bottom and long socks with puttee and desert boots. The paler tan shade of KD was more suited to desert or semi-desert regions than the "dark khaki" or brown serge used in British Battledress (which had begun replacing the serge Service Dress as the temperate field uniform in 1939). When the Allies moved up through Italy, however, two-piece khaki denim battledress overalls were increasingly preferred. By 1943, the KD shirt began to be replaced by a more durable cotton KD bush jacket.

== Far East ==
Newly arrived British soldiers in KD uniform on board a troopship, October 1941

In the Far East, the British found themselves at war with the Japanese while equipped with the impractically coloured KD uniform. Shirts and trousers were dyed green as a temporary expedient until more suitable jungle clothing became available. A new tropical uniform in Jungle Green (JG) was quickly developed – a JG Aertex battledress blouse, a JG Aertex bush jacket (as an alternative to the blouse) and battledress trousers in JG cotton drill. In the hot and humid conditions of Southeast Asia, JG darkened with sweat almost immediately.

== Post Second World War ==
A British soldier in KD uniform in Aden, 1960s

The khaki battledress was used until the late 1960s, and various uniform items in KD, JG and olive green (OG) remained on issue to soldiers serving in the Mediterranean, Middle East or tropics after the war. By the end of the 1940s, however, stocks were becoming depleted, and a new 1950-pattern tropical uniform was made available in both KD and JG. It was poorly designed, with an ill-fitting bush jacket in the much-maligned Aertex, and suspender buckles that dug into the hips when marching in full kit. Eventually the much more practical Gurkha regiments' JG shirt was copied, replacing the 1950-pattern bush jacket. All the same, troops still sought out the older, wartime, issues of the better KD, JG and OG kit.

== Gallery ==
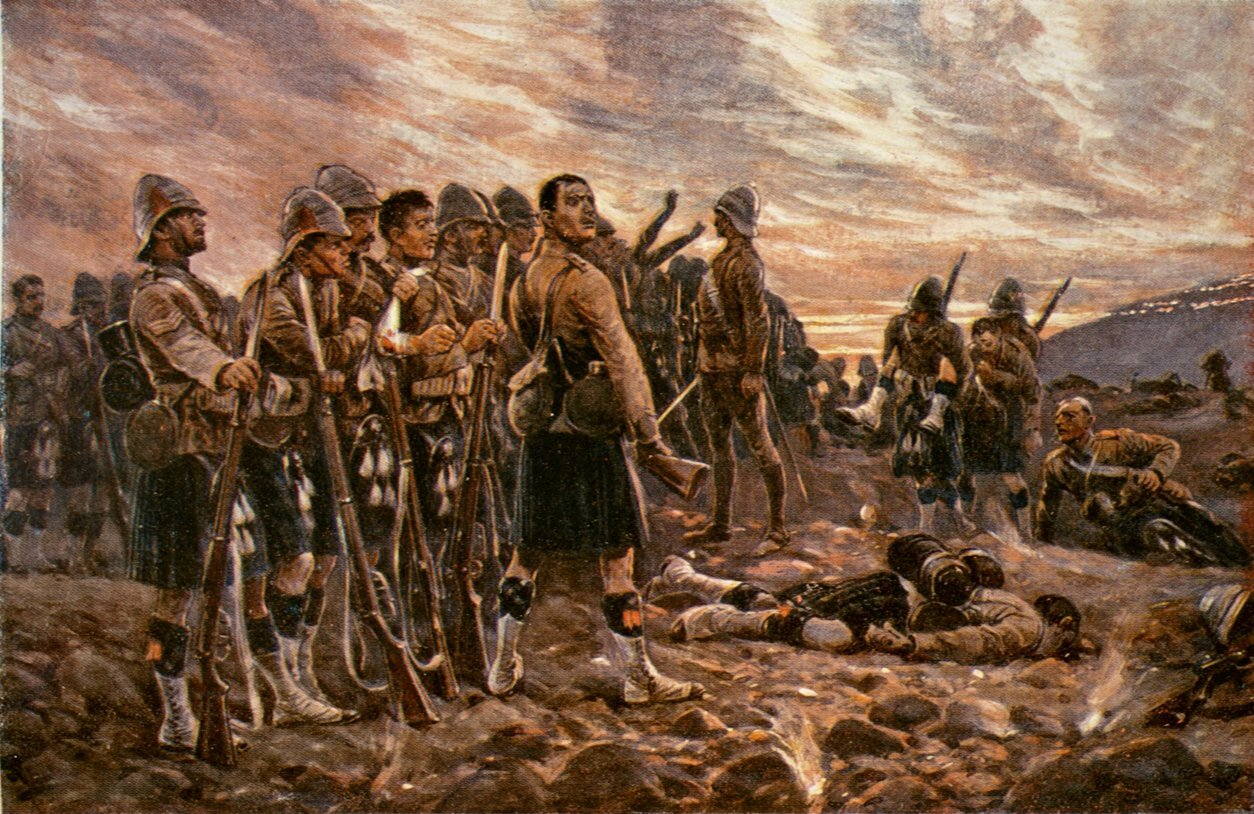
The Black Watch after the Battle of Magersfontein, showing an early version of the khaki drill jacket combined with kilts

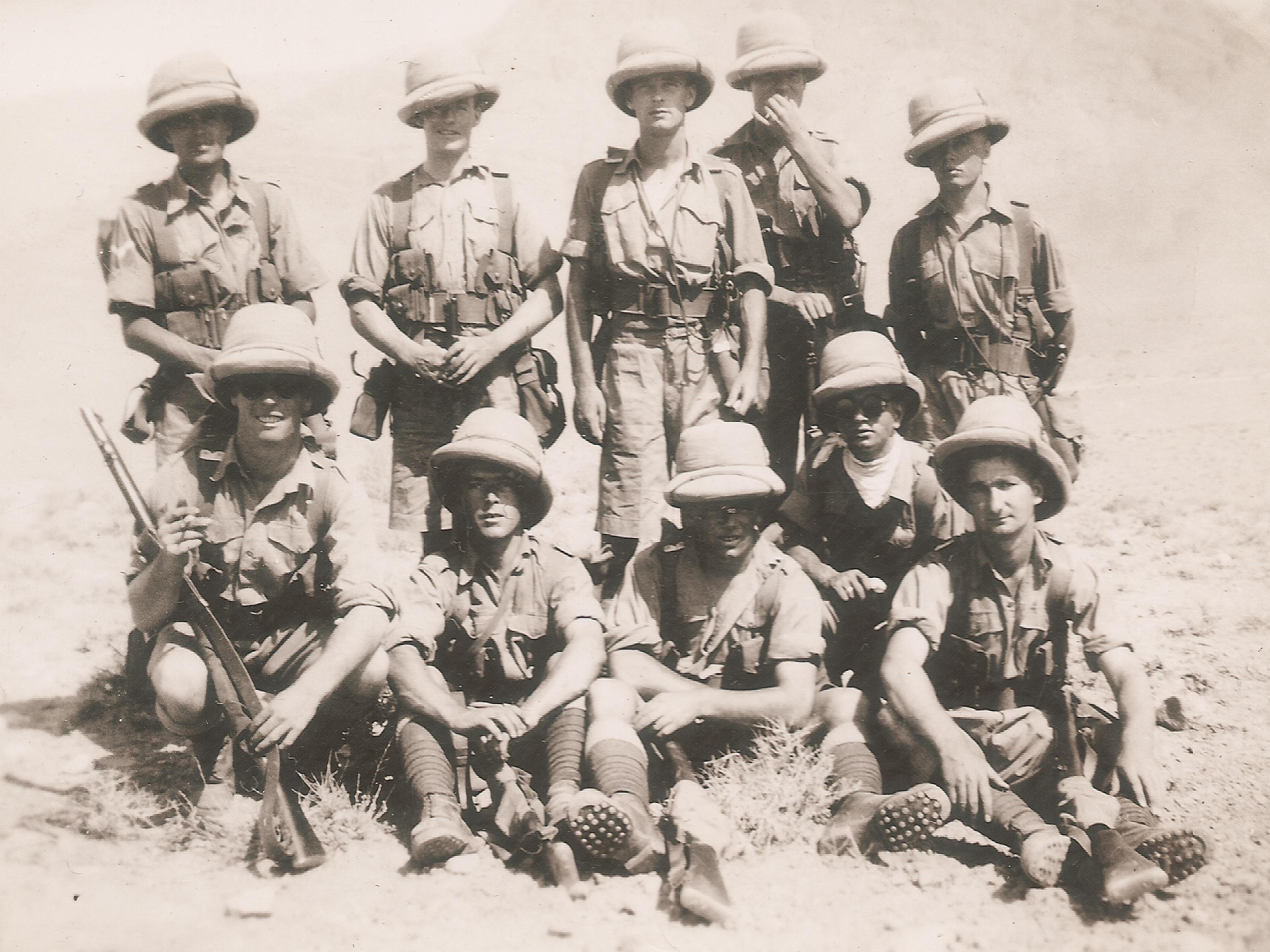
Soldiers of the 1st Battalion of the West Yorkshire Regiment (Prince of Wales's Own) in Egypt, 1931-1933

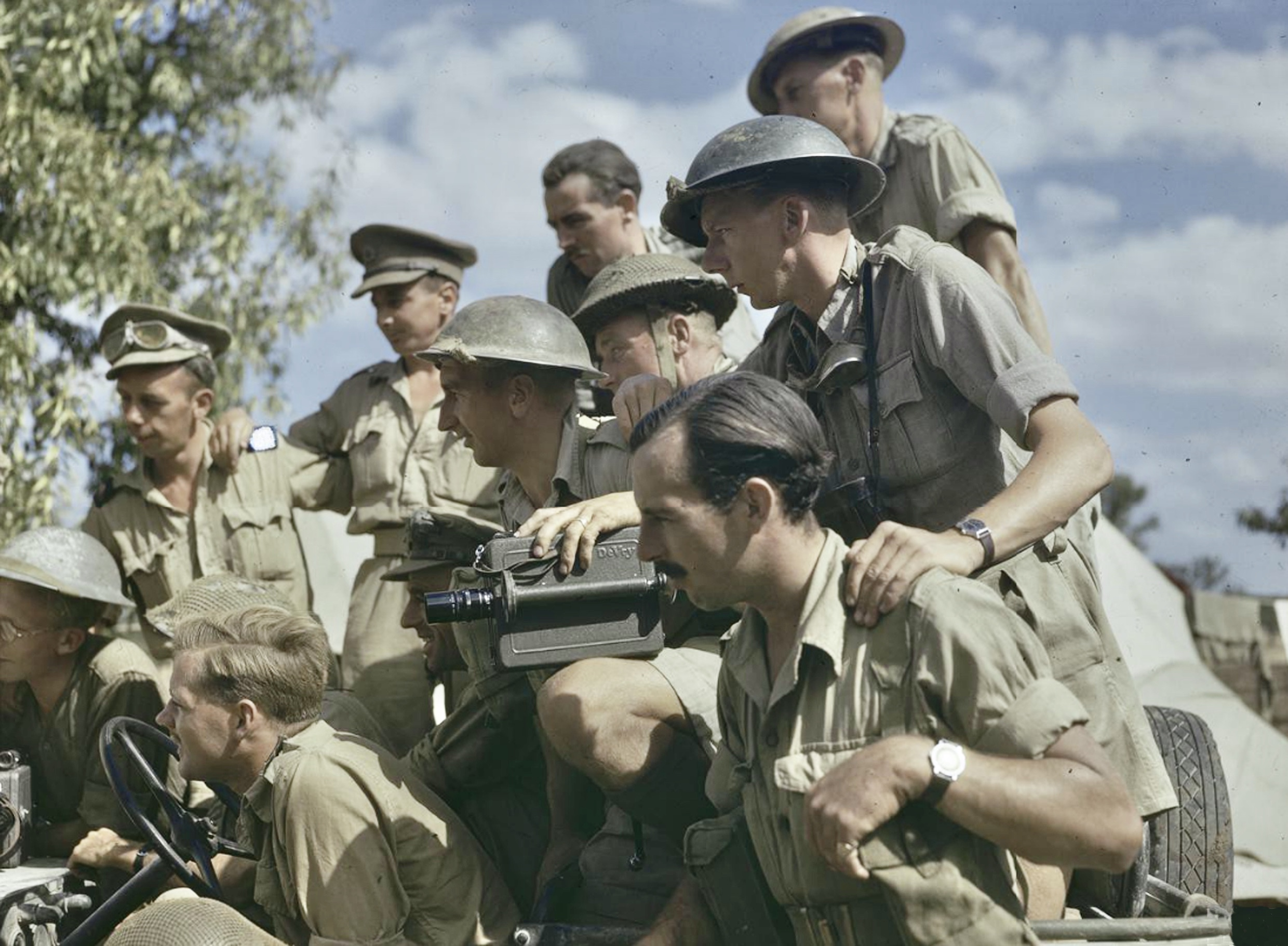
Soldiers in khaki drill receive a briefing at Eighth Army Headquarters in Italy, September 1943.

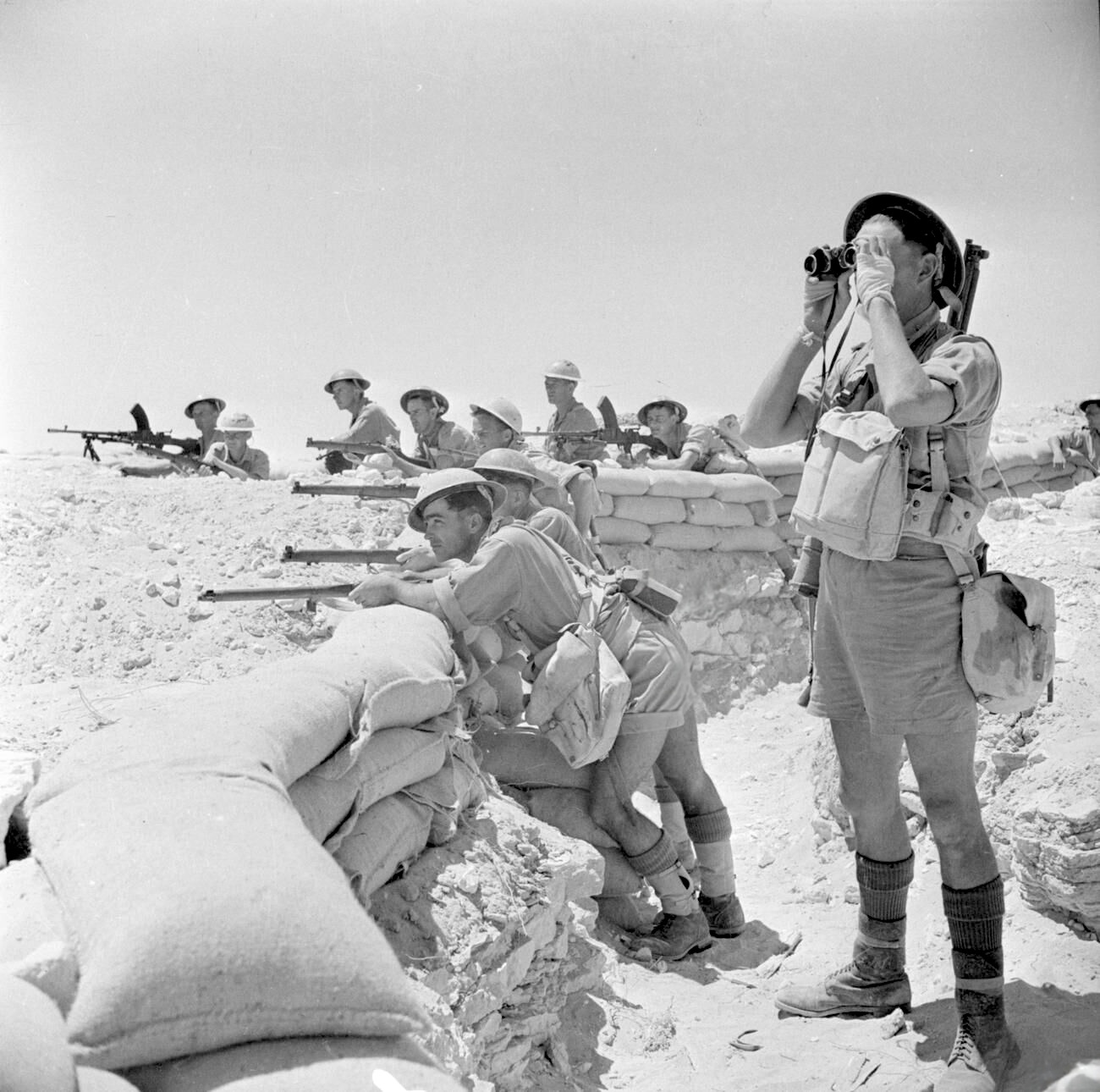
British Commonwealth infantry manning a sandbagged defensive position near El Alamein, 17 July 1942

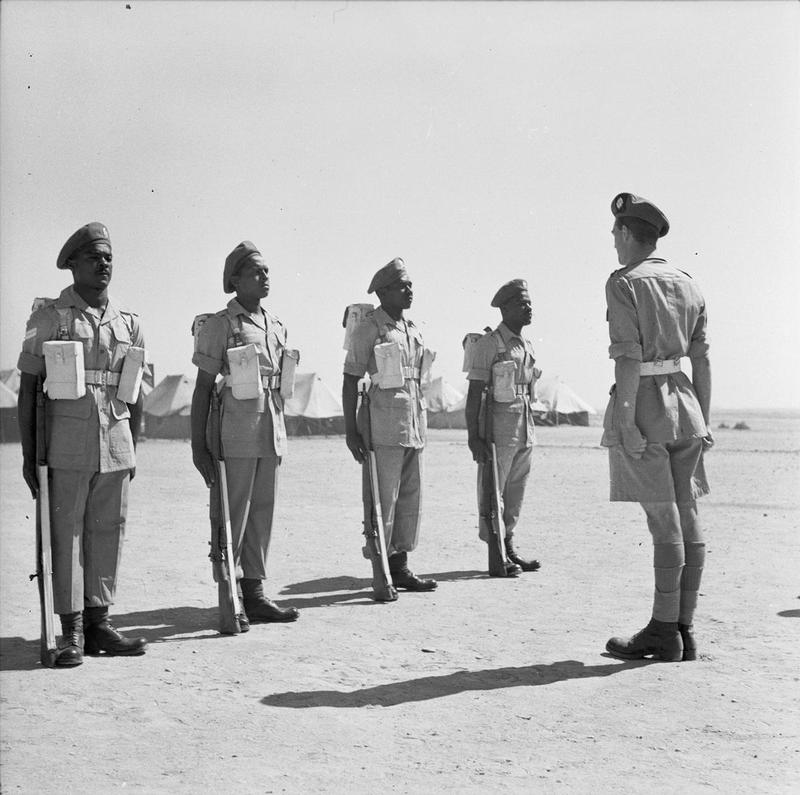
Caribbean Regiment soldiers in Egypt

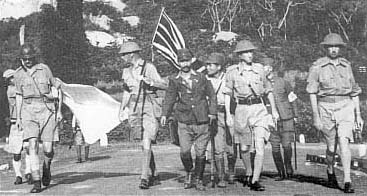
Lt Gen. Arthur Percival, led by a Japanese officer, walks under a flag of truce to negotiate the capitulation of Allied forces in Singapore, on 15 February 1942. All wear standard KD with shorts.

Two sappers of the Royal Engineers dressed in desert khaki drill uniform using detectors to sweep for mines, Egypt, 1942.

Dressed in tropical khaki drill uniform, British troops advancing along the coast of Tamatave, Madagascar's principal port, 18 September 1942

An Eighth Army soldier dressed in khaki drill uniform, with a local girl in Sicily, August 1943

The British Army on Leave in Italy, June 1944
