= Willis & Geiger Outfitters =

American business

Willis & Geiger Outfitters was an expeditionary outfitting company in the United States. The company outfitted Roald Amundsen, Charles Lindbergh, Amelia Earhart, Jacqueline Cochran, Sir Edmund Hillary, Jim Fowler, the Flying Tigers, and other legends of the 20th century.

In 1902, Ben Willis developed his own clothing for his Arctic explorations. He continued to design clothing, selling it through retailer Abercrombie & Fitch, which outfitted Teddy Roosevelt with clothing designed by Willis. In 1928, Willis brought in marketer Howard W. Geiger; they founded Willis & Geiger Outfitters.

The company picked up a US defense contract for air force pilot jackets in 1931. In 1936, Ernest Hemingway designed his own bush jacket made by Willis & Geiger Outfitters. A version of the G-1 military flight jacket was made under contract during World War II, designed by Eddie Bauer.

When Abercrombie & Fitch went bankrupt in 1977, Willis & Geiger was its largest unpaid creditor and went out of business, but was independently revived by former Abercrombie & Fitch employee Burt Avedon. The company was sold to VF Corporation in 1986, which shut down US manufacturing of the product line before selling the company to Laura Ashley in 1987, who then sold it to the Japanese company D'URBAN.

Finally, in 1994, Willis & Geiger was sold to Lands' End, and its offices were moved from New York City to Wisconsin. Sales grew, but conflicts between Avedon and Lands' End management led to the discontinuation of the brand by 1999.
