= Léon de Lunden =

Belgian sport shooter

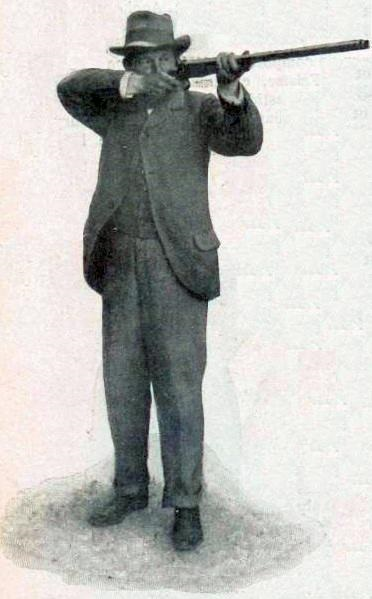

Personal information
- Born: 5 May 1856
- Died: 13 January 1947 (aged 90)

Sport
- Sport: Shooting
- Event(s): Live pigeon shooting Trap shooting
Medal record
Representing Belgium
Men's Shooting
Gold medal – first place	1900 Paris	Pigeon shoot

Léon de Lunden (5 May 1856 – 13 January 1947) was a Belgian sports shooter who competed at the 1900 Summer Olympics. He won a gold medal in the live pigeon shoot, an event that was unique to the 1900 Games and is no longer recognised by the International Olympic Committee. He totaled 21 kills during the tournament to take gold. He won 5,000 francs for his victory.
