= Victor Sarasqueta =

Fine gun making firm

Víctor Sarasqueta Shotgun

Victor Sarasqueta was a firm of fine gun makers based in Eibar (Basque Country), Spain. It mostly produced originally-designed quality side-by-side shotguns and double rifles based on British designs.

The business was founded in 1883 and in 1902 received a Royal Warrant as a purveyor of guns to the King of Spain.

After being reorganised as Victor Sarasqueta Rifles y Escopetas Especiales, S.A., the business became part of the DiArm Group in the mid-1980s, a company which did not survive that decade.

Other guns made by Felix Sarasqueta and J.J. Sarasqueta also exist, these manufacturers are related to Victor Sarasqueta.
