= Royal warrant of appointment (Spain) =

Purveyor of the Royal House
- Country: Spain
- Presented by: Monarch of Spain
- First award: 1614

Royal warrants of appointment (Spanish: Proveedores de la Real Casa) have been issued for centuries to those who supplied goods or services to the Monarch of Spain. The warrant enables the company to advertise the royal approval of distinction with the display of the royal coat of arms, thus lending prestige to the company.

The royal warrant of appointment is typically advertised on company hoardings, letter-heads and products by displaying the arms as appropriate. Underneath the emblem will usually appear the phrase "Proveedor de la Real Casa", which translates as "Purveyor of the Royal House".

== History ==
The commercial distinction of Purveyor of the Royal House dates back to 1614, when such grant was first authorised. During Isabella II's reign, 83 titles were granted; 142 under the reign of her son Alfonso XII, 96 were extended during the regency of Queen Maria Christina and 66 during the reign of Alfonso XIII.

The chosen establishments integrated a select list of purveyors throughout Spain that regularly sold its products to the royal house, considered always of high when not of splendid quality; perfumes, guns, rice or nougat, shoes, garments and even pianos. In return, merchants, including some foreigners, were allowed to use the Spanish Crown shield in correspondence, labeling and invoices, as well as in the exterior signs of their businesses.

Inside those shops, some of them still decorated with prominent mahogany counters and gleaming showcases, a coveted parchment 60cm long and 40cm wide, written always in exquisite calligraphy and hung from the main wall; in it, the Head of the Royal Household testified that the owner of the commercial premises, "by order of the King", could be considered a Supplier of the Royal House, "for his intelligence and satisfaction." Some establishments still keep it, such as "Seseña", a supplier of Spanish cloaks in Madrid.

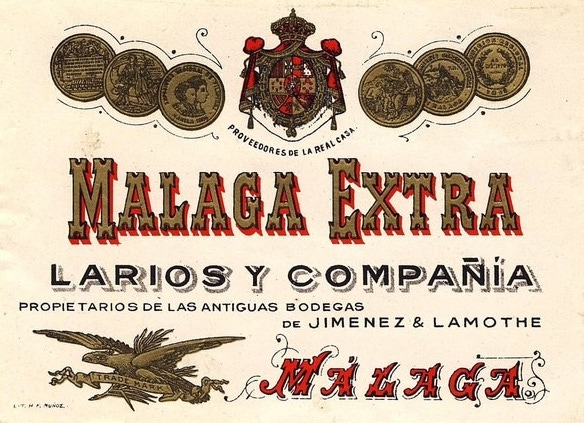
Royal Warrant of Larios, a Spanish distillery

== Royal warrant holders ==
Companies that have received the honour are Seseña, Loewe, Camisería Burgos, Sarasqueta, Vaquería del Republicano, Jimenez y Lamothe, Viena Capellanes, SOLÉNER (Soluciones Energéticas S.A.), Confiteria de Alfredo Reig, and many cigar companies such as H. Upmann. Foreign purveyors include Cartier SA, Charvet Place Vendôme, Jacob & Josef Kohn, and Steinway & Sons.

== See also ==
- Royal warrant of appointment
- Royal Household of Spain
