= Aertex =

British clothing company and fabric

- Industry: clothing
- Founded: 1888
- Founder: Lewis Haslam
- Headquarters: Manchester, UK
- Website: aertex.com

Aertex was a British clothing company based in Manchester, England, established in 1888, and also is the name of the fabric manufactured by that company. The Aertex company owned the trademark for Aertex fabric, a lightweight and loosely woven cotton material that is used to make shirts and underwear.

== History ==
In the late 19th century Lewis Haslam, a Lancashire mill owner and politician, began to link the partnering of holes and warmth and with two medical colleagues, began experimenting with aeration; trapping air within the warp and weft of fabric. The result was a fabric that provided a barrier between the warmth of the skin and the chill of the atmosphere and in 1888 they formed the Aertex Company. During World War II the British Women's Land Army wore Aertex as part of their uniform and all the British and Commonwealth land forces in the Far East and Middle East wore Aertex bush shirts and jackets. These uniforms were designated as Jungle Green for the Far East and Khaki Drill for the Middle East.

Soon after the end of the Second World War, Princess Elizabeth and Princess Margaret were reported to be wearing Aertex shirts.

In 1959 Aertex, together with Ovaltine, sponsored the 'All New Netball Associations' coaching film. By the 1960s Aertex became a sports and school wear manufacturer in the UK, across a range of sports including tennis, cricket, netball and football. The England football squad wore Aertex fabric jerseys manufactured by Umbro during the 1970 World Cup in Mexico.

== See also ==
- List of fabric names
