= Carlos Alfonso de Mitjans, 21st Count of Teba =

Spanish aristocrat (1907–1997)

The Most Excellent The Count of Teba GE
- Carlos Alfonso at the World Pigeon-shooting final in Vichy, 1953

Personal details
- Born: Carlos Alfonso de Mitjans y Fitz-James Stuart; 3 May 1907 Polán, Spain
- Died: 28 August 1997 (aged 90)
- Spouse: Elena Verea y Corcuera (m. 1935)
- Children: 3

Carlos Alfonso de Mitjans y Fitz-James Stuart, 21st Count of Teba, GE (3 May 1907 – 28 August 1997) also known as Bunting, was a Spanish nobleman and hunter, and one of the greatest Olympic shooters of his time. He was a son of Juan Manuel de Mitjans y Manzanedo, 2nd Duke of Santoña, and his spouse Eugenia María Fitz-James Stuart y Falcó, 21st Countess of Teba and sister of the 17th Duke of Alba. Through his mother he was a Stuart, a male line grandchild of James II, and was a relative and close friend of the British royal family.

A celebrated figure in the world of menswear, his sartorial legacy includes the Teba jacket, a popular country garment.

== Biography ==
=== Early years ===
Carlos was born 3 May 1907 in his family's finca (estate), "Ventosilla", in Polán, Toledo, Spain. His father was Juan Manuel de Mitjans y Manzanedo, 2nd Duke of Santoña, whose father bought the estate and refurbished it to receive frequent visits from Alfonso XIII to shoot red-legged partridge. His mother was Eugenia María Fitz-James Stuart y Falcó, 21st Countess of Teba, sister of the 17th Duke of Alba and of the 18th Duke of Peñaranda. Eugenia was a member of the House of Stuart, as a direct male line descendant of James FitzJames, son of James II and Arabella Churchill, herself a sister of the 1st Duke of Marlborough. This shared lineage with the British royal family motivated Carlos' good relationship with his distant relative, Queen Elizabeth and particularly with her husband the Duke of Edinburgh, with whom he shared many shooting outings.

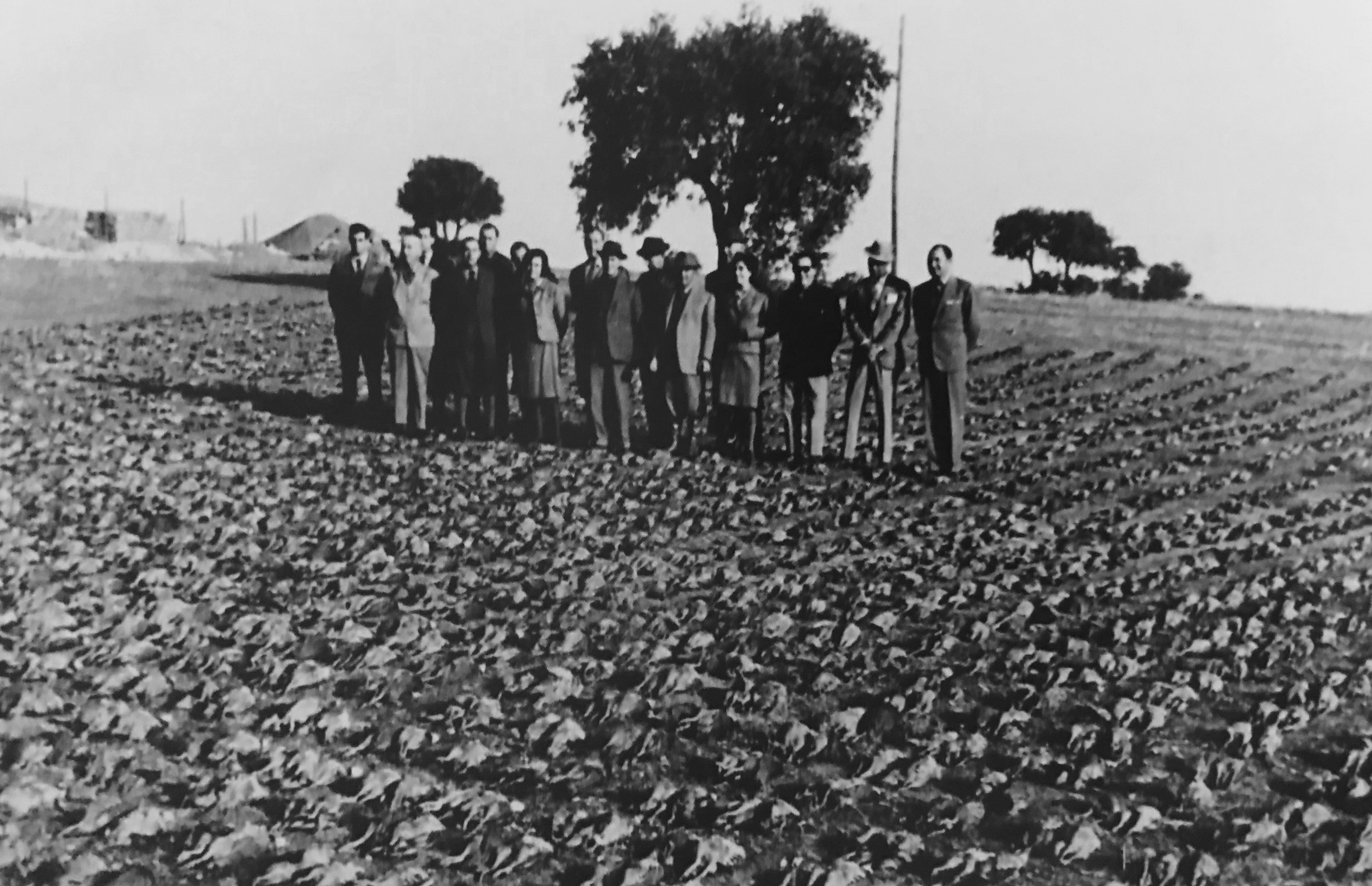
World record broken at Santa Cruz de Mudela, 1959. A total of 4,608 partridges were shot in a single morning. Franco can be seen in the centre, and Teba is the second from the right

In 1966, Teba was one of the hosts of Jacqueline Kennedy during her visit to Seville.

=== Marriage and issue ===
Teba married Elena Verea y Corcuera, a lady from a distinguished Mexican family. The wedding took place 1 March 1935 in the church of Saint-Philippe-du-Roule, Paris. They had three daughters:

- Macarena Mitjans y Verea, 23rd Countess of Teba
- Sofía Mitjans y Verea
- María de los Reyes Mitjans y Verea, 20th Marchioness of Ardales

== Titles ==
- 19th Marquess of Ardales
- 21st Count of Teba
- 15th Count of Baños (GE)

== Bibliography ==
- Castellano, Rafael (2017). Cazadores Españoles del Siglo XX. Madrid: Turner Libros. ISBN 978-84-16714-29-2.
