= Spanish cloak =

Type of garment

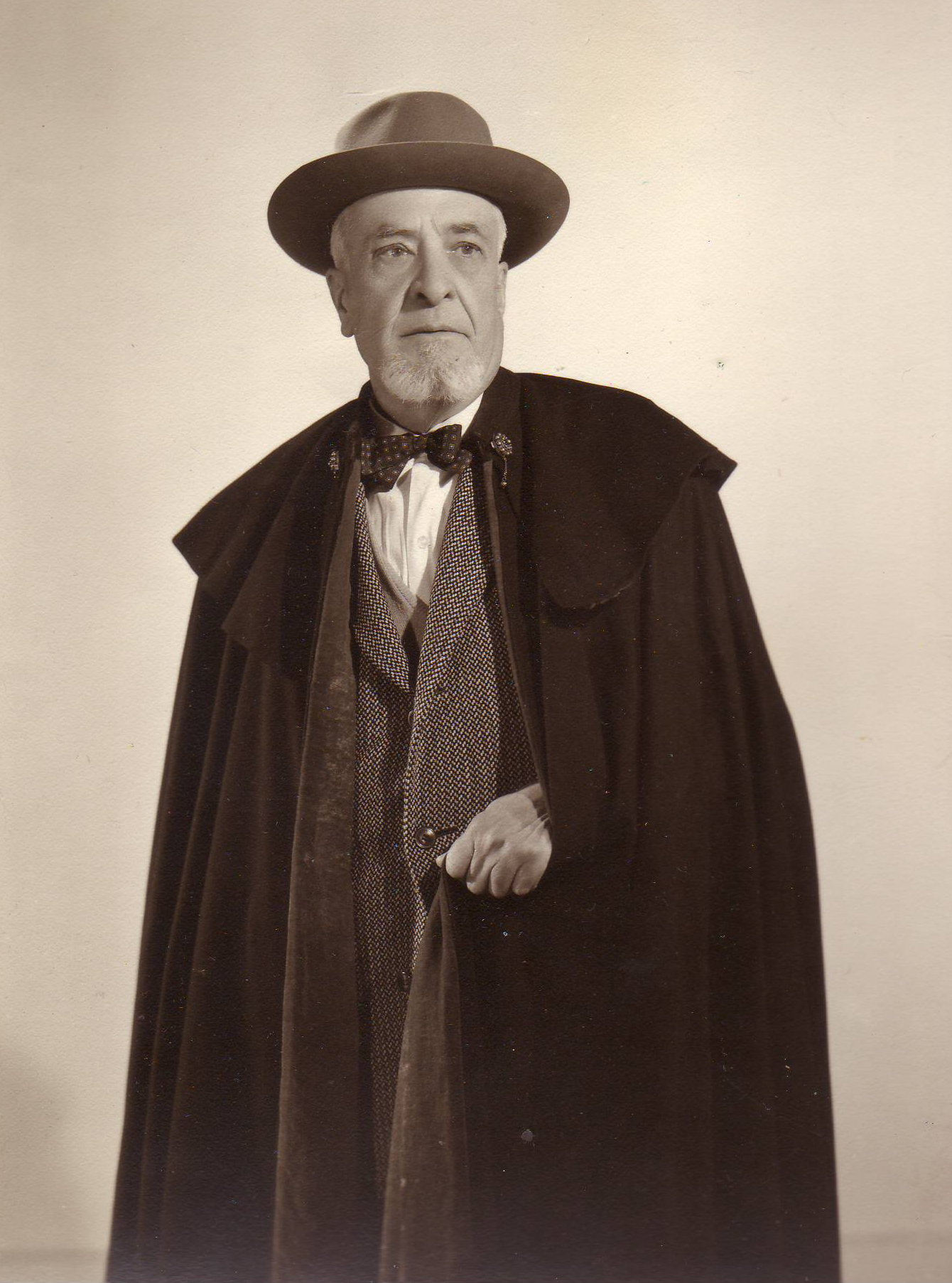
- A man wearing a Spanish cloak in the 1950s
- Type: Cloak
- Material: Cloth
- Place of origin: Spain
- Introduced: 19th century

A Spanish cloak is a garment typically worn in the Spanish-speaking world, and dates back to the late nineteenth century. It was the garment of priests and traditional Christians. It is called "Spanish" or even "Pañosa," being made of cloth, wide flight and with bands of velvet lining revealing color at the front edges.

== History ==
The cloak is thought to originate from the "Sagun", a garment worn by the Celtiberians.

Much later the cloak was banned by one of the ministers of Carlos III, triggering the start of the Esquilache riots in the eighteenth century. Richard Ford, in 1845, wrote that the cloak "favours habits of inactivity, prevents the over-zealous arms or elbows from doing anything, conceals a knife and rags, and, when muffled around, offers a disguise for intrigues and robbery", and that this is why it was banned.

The first cloaks of the nineteenth century came from some of the wool-producing areas such as Béjar in Salamanca. It is for this reason that one of its early precursors corresponds to the Duke of Béjar.

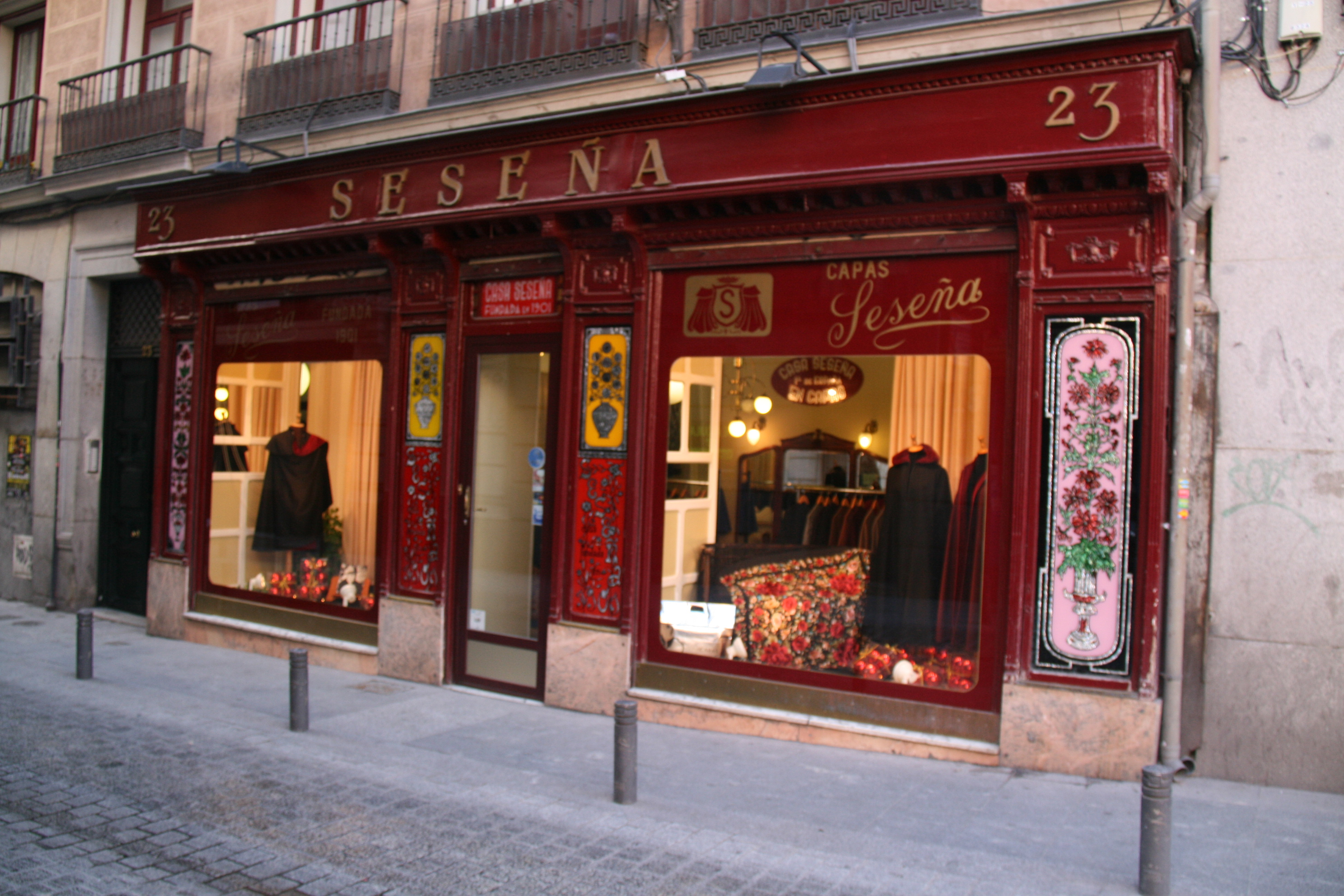
"Seseña", an ancient Royal Purveyor of Spanish cloaks in Madrid

In the nineteenth century the cloak became very popular and thought of as elegant and stylish. Its use decreased around 1900.

The journalist Antonio Velasco Zazo founded in Madrid the Association Cloak (called "La capa") in 1928, which was devoted entirely to encouraging the Spanish cloak as part of the popular apparel in Madrid. Zazo frequently wore the "castizo Spanish coat", whilst still wearing a hat, a custom among intellectuals. Although the association emerged in Madrid, it was something also typical in the history of Spain, and its prevalence existed in many cities.

== Features ==
The cloak is long, open at the front and sleeveless. It was originally worn by men; models for women began to exist at the end of the 20th century.

The most common colours for the cloak are black, navy blue and brown. It typically includes a fibula (generally similar to those of forms charro button)..

It is often made of 100% sheep's wool, or 90% wool and 10% cashmere. In the present day it typically includes some amount of polyamide fiber.

The emboli, the part that covers the face, is almost always 100% cotton velvet and is dyed in different colours: red, maroon, green.
