= Camisería Burgos =

Bespoke shirt-maker in Madrid

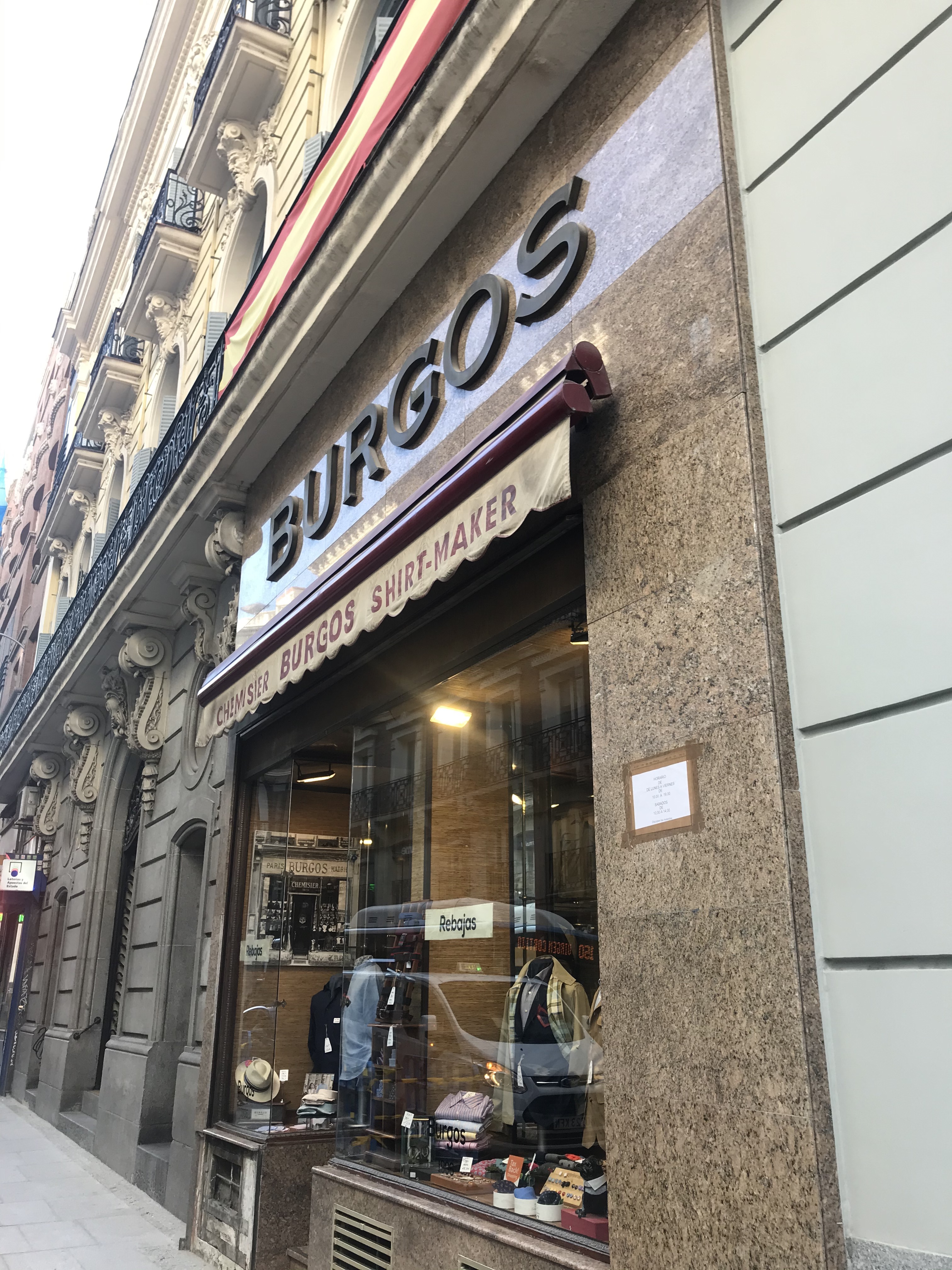
- External view of the store
- Company type: Private
- Industry: Clothing
- Founded: 1906; 120 years ago
- Founder: Julián Pérez Burgos
- Headquarters: Calle Cedaceros 2 Madrid 28014; Spain
- Products: Shirts, pyjamas, knitwear, blazers, accessories, hosiery
- Services: Bespoke, made-to-measure, ready-to-wear
- Website: camiseriaburgos.com/en/

Camisería Burgos, commonly known as Burgos (Spanish: [ˈbuɾɣos]), is a gentleman's bespoke shirtmaker founded in 1906 in Madrid. The store has been located at Calle Cedaceros 2 since its opening, and until 1949, had another shop at Boulevard des Capucines in Paris. Their most popular products are bespoke shirts, guayaberas, pyjamas and Teba jackets.

Burgos enjoys a Royal Warrant of Appointment since Alfonso XIII bestowed it in 1920, and has been the main shirt purveyor to the Royal House of Spain ever since, Felipe VI being a regular customer. Other notable customers include Cary Grant, Ernest Hemingway, Orson Welles, Pablo Picasso, Jeff Goldblum and Tsar Simeon of Bulgaria. It has also provided shirts for numerous films, including those of Woody Allen, Adrien Brody, Sharon Stone and Andy García. All clothing is made in Spain.

== History ==
Camisería Burgos was founded in 1906 by Julián Pérez Burgos in Calle Cedaceros 2, Madrid. In 1936, he moved to Paris fleeing from the Spanish Civil War, and opened a second Burgos shop in Boulevard des Capucines. Santiago Olave, one of his shirt-makers, took over the shop in Madrid, and as of today, it remains in that family. In 1920, Alfonso XIII became a customer and granted Burgos the Royal Warrant of Appointment.

== Regal purveyors ==
Felipe VI, the king of Spain, has owned bespoke shirts from Burgos since his first communion in 1975.

His father, grandfather and great-grandfather: Juan Carlos I, the Count of Barcelona and Alfonso XIII respectively, have all been customers of Burgos. Simeon Saxe-Coburg-Gotha, former Tsar of Bulgaria, is another customer.

== Today ==
The house continues to be a family-owned business, led by Carmen Álvarez Olave, granddaughter of Santiago Olave and 3rd generation in the family. In addition to retail sales at its flagship store in Madrid, Camisería Burgos travels to receive customers at trunk shows in New York and London.

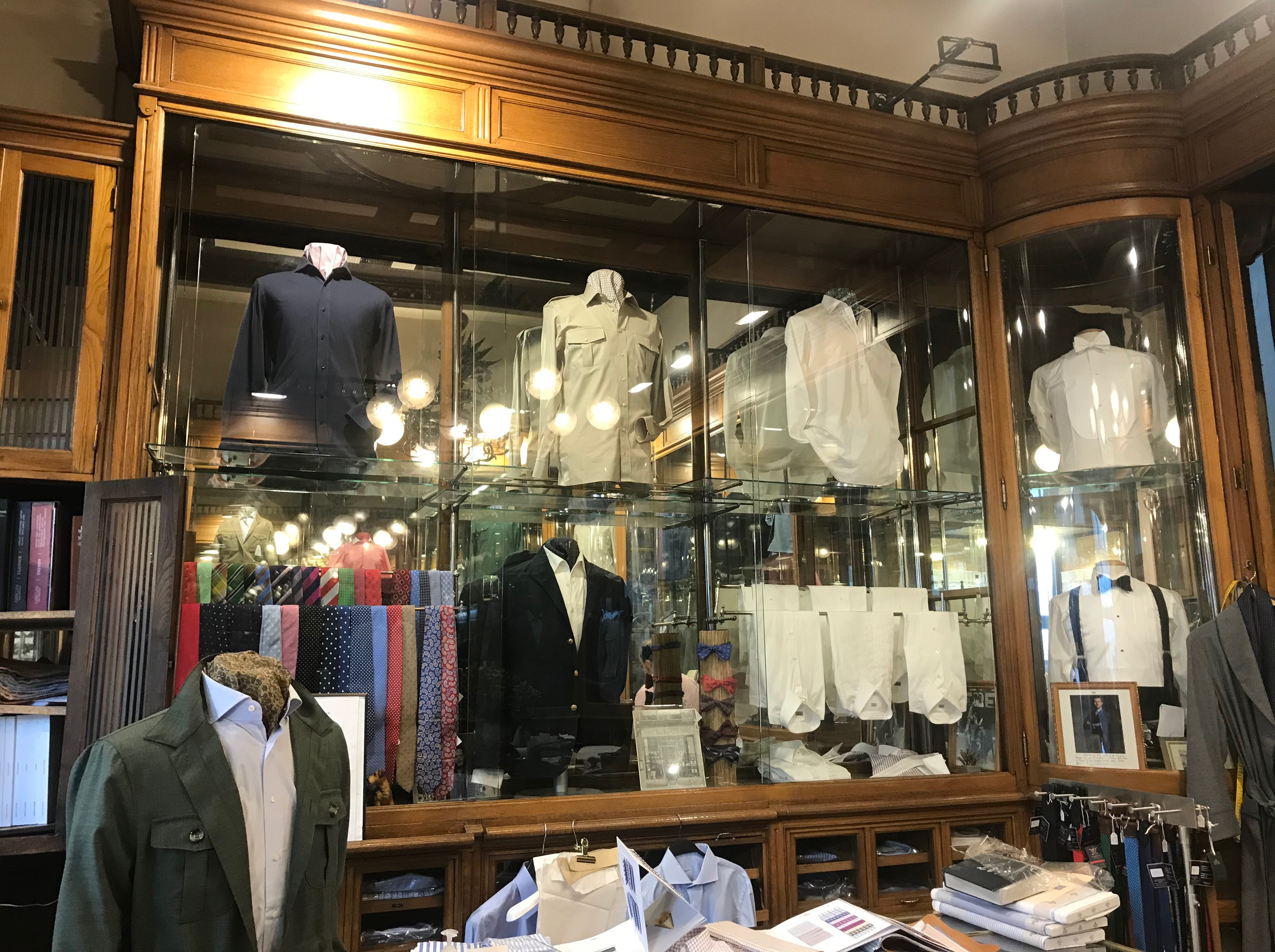
View of the interior of the store

== See also ==
- Tailoring
