= Teba jacket =

Type of single-breasted jacket

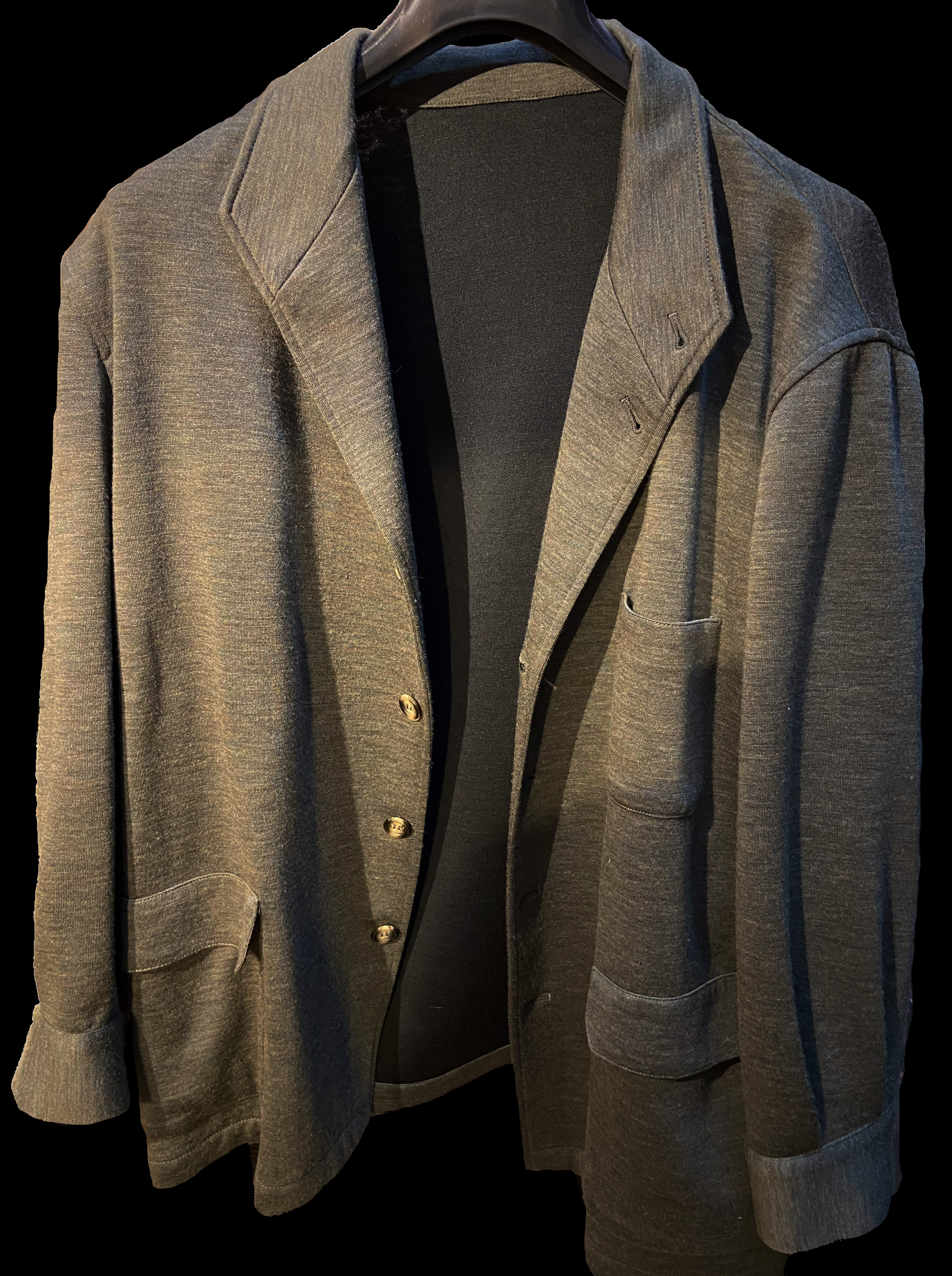
A dark green wool Teba jacket

A Teba jacket is a soft, single-breasted jacket, unpadded throughout the chest and shoulders, and featuring shirt-like sleeves, ventless backs, diamond-shaped notchless lapels and patch pockets with flaps. It generally has four front buttons, either in leather or nacre. Tebas are made in many fabrics, but the most common are wool, cashmere and linen.

There are several ways in which the jacket's buttons should be fastened when worn, but the bottom one should always remain undone. For example, it is possible to fasten the top three, the second and third, or only the second.

== Origins ==
It was originally designed as a shooting blazer that would not make it difficult to raise the elbow when firing. Contrary to common misconception that it was first tailored in Savile Row, the jacket was born out of a small tailor shop in Zarautz, Spain, and was named after the 21st Count of Teba, Carlos Alfonso Mitjans y Fitz-James Stuart, who later gifted Alfonso XIII with one during a partridge driven hunt in Spain. The tailor in question, María Sorreluz Múgica, was commissioned by Teba to design a soft and comfortable yet elegant jacket for him to use at the pigeon-shooting in Igeldo and Zarautz, where he spent his summers.

The Teba jacket has since been used not only as an iconic piece of Spanish countrywear, but also as a city outfit due to its popularity throughout the world. From the beginning, Teba jackets developed a strong association with the aristocratic land-owning upper classes.

A navy linen Teba was worn by Timothy Dalton as James Bond in the 1989 film Licence to Kill, in a scene where Bond resigns in Key West and becomes a rogue agent.

== Gallery ==
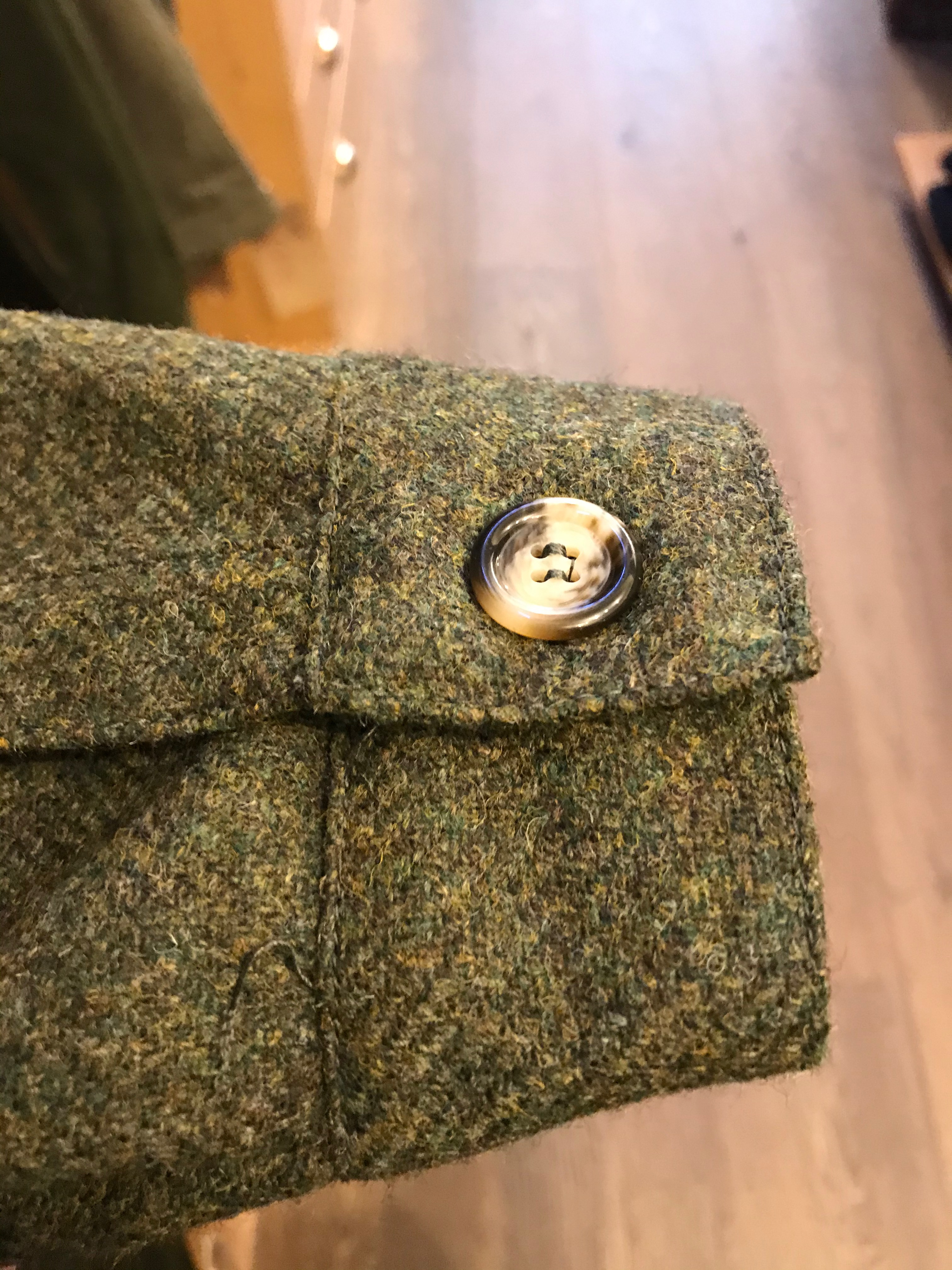
An example of the cuff of a tweed Teba, with the horn button variety.

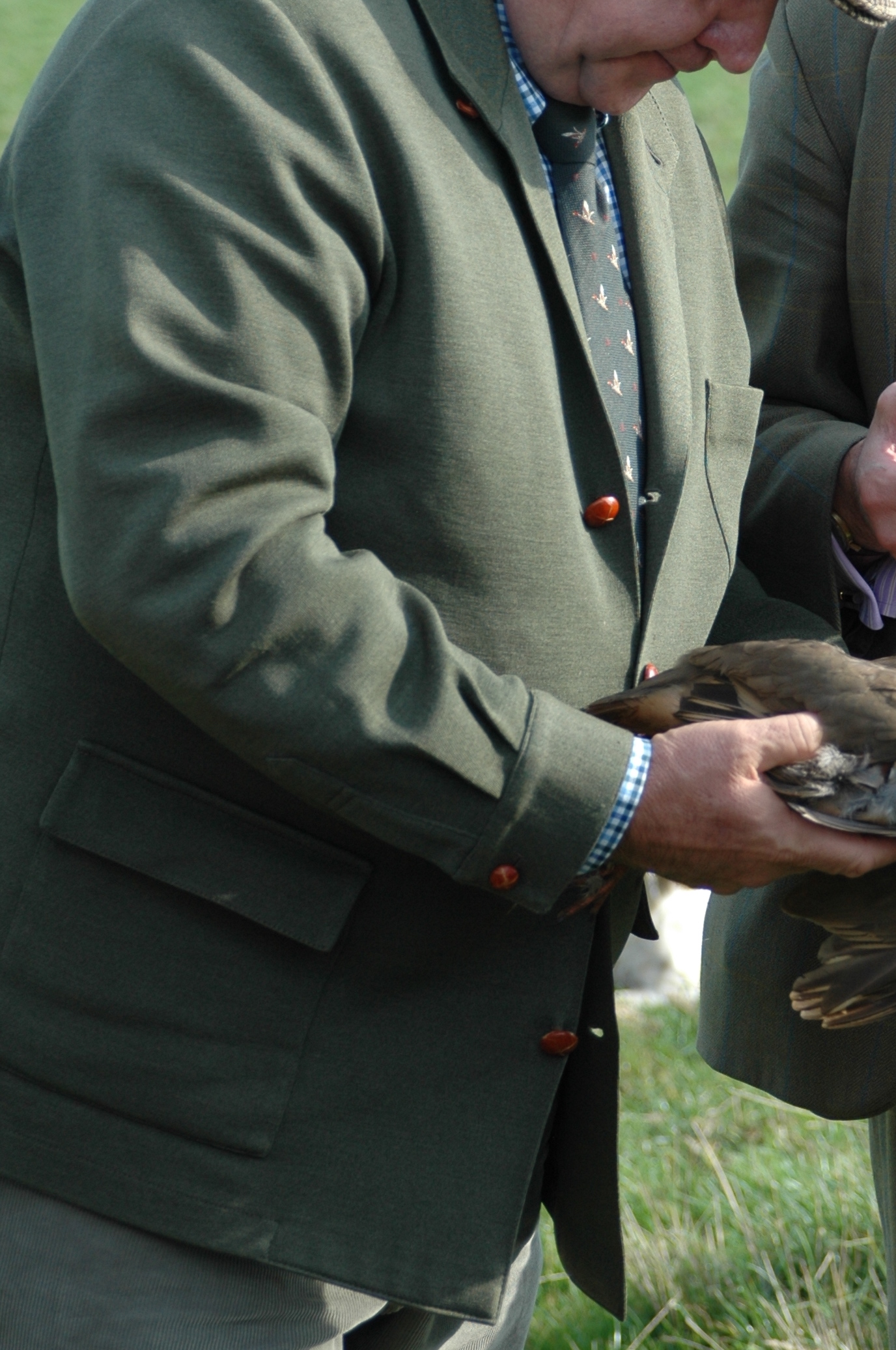
An olive wool Teba with leather buttons in a bird hunt in Suffolk, England.

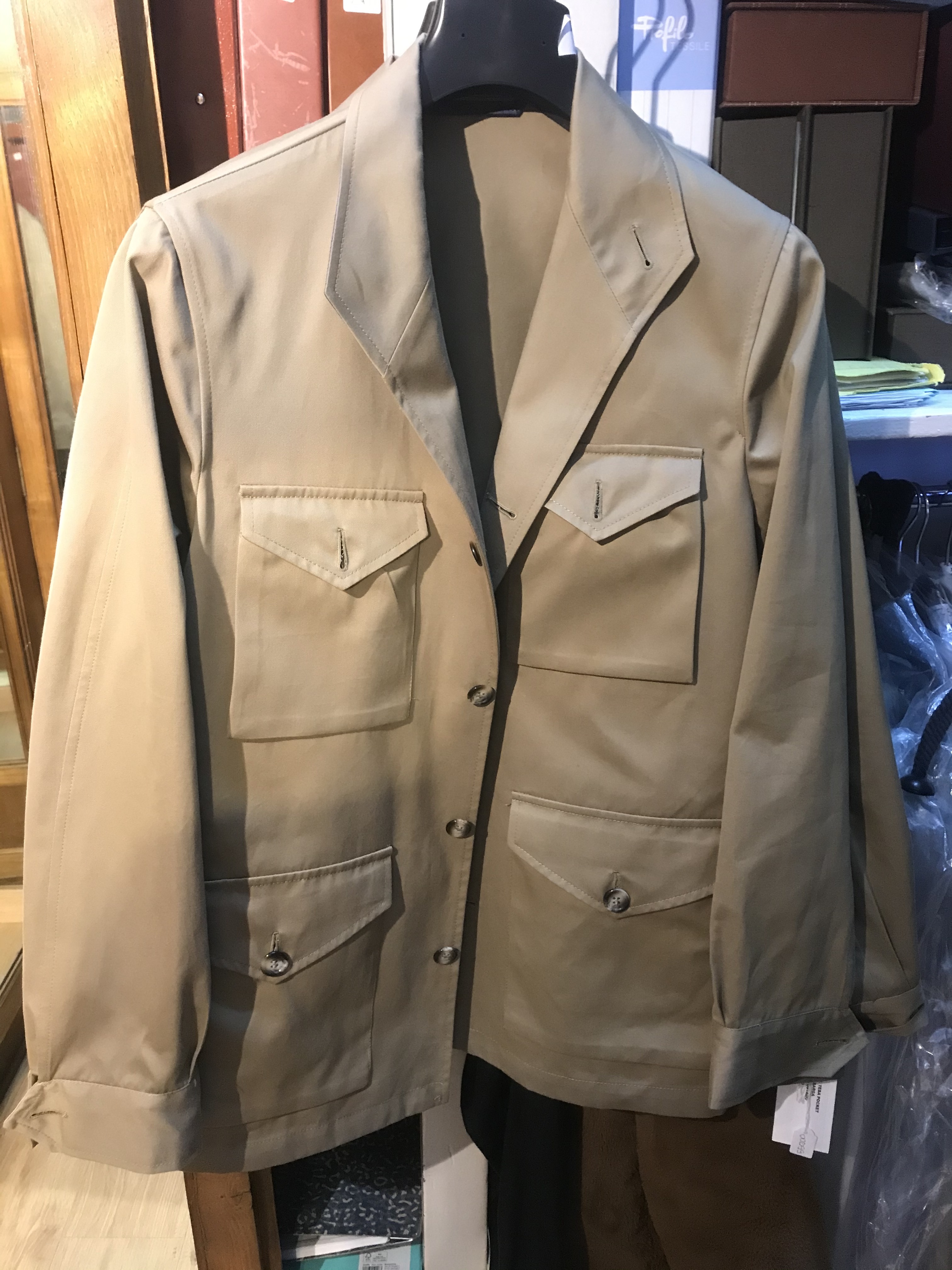
A variety known as Teba sahariana (Safari Teba), a hybrid with a safari jacket.

== See also ==
- British country clothing
- Camisería Burgos
- Hunting in Spain

== Bibliography ==
- Chenoune, Farid (1996). A History of Men's Fashion. Flammarion. ISBN 978-20-80135-36-0.
- Castellano, Rafael (2017). Cazadores Españoles del Siglo XX. Madrid: Turner Libros. p. 206. ISBN 978-84-16714-29-2.
