= Made in Spain =

Made in Spain is a merchandise mark indicating that a product is all planned, manufactured and packed in Spain.

== Agriculture ==
Spain is the biggest exporter of wine and olive oil in the world.

== Automobiles ==
In 2015 Spain produced 2.7 million cars, which made it the 8th largest automobile producer country in the world. The forecast as of 2016 was to produce a total of 2.8 million vehicles, from which about 80% is for export.
