= Mundus furniture =

Mundus was the name of a furniture-manufacturing company, active (at least) in several places in the Austro-Hungarian Empire, at the end of the 19th century and early 20th century.

Factories seem to have existed in multiple locations, as the products carry diverse labels, such as "Budapest", "Borlova", "Czechoslovakia", etc. Some of the furniture was co-signed with "Jacob and Josef Kohn".

In 1914 Mundus merged with J. & J. Kohn, and in 1922 with Gebrüder Thonet.
