= Pigeon shooting =

Shooting sport involving live pigeons

Pigeon shooting is a type of live bird wing shooting competition.

Traditionally, there are two types of competition: box birds and columbaire. In box birds, the pigeons are held in a mechanical device that releases them when the shooter calls out. In columbaire, the birds are hand thrown by a person when called upon. The pigeons are bred for speed. The most common species of pigeon used in regulated shooting contests is known as a zurito (Columba oenas). In the shooting competition, large sums of money are gambled and winners can have purses exceeding US$50,000. The equipment for the sport can be specialized and purpose-built.

In the past, the sport was popular worldwide. It was primarily a sport of the upper class and was held at resort locations such as Monaco and Havana. Popular magazines have covered the sport—for example, Field & Stream and Sports Illustrated But, over time, the sport has fallen out of widespread favor due to costs, alternative shooting sports such as trap shooting, skeet shooting, and sporting clays, and animal rights activism, along with hunting simulation video games which provided the same experience, but without the threat of any physical harm to animals. Proponents of the sport argue that live pigeons are more challenging to shoot than clay targets. Many claim that pigeon shoots are no more cruel than extermination efforts carried out in cities where feral pigeons are considered a nuisance and are often controlled using lethal methods. The United States Department of Agriculture euthanizes over 60,000 pigeons a year in response to complaints.

In the past, events were publicly posted. The sport still exists in pockets around the world, but generally, it is not well publicized and it is only hosted in select locations, such as private gun clubs typically by invitation only.

In the United States live pigeon shoots have been held on large privately owned ranches and plantations in the South. Usually, this is to avoid the attention of protesters inevitably attracted by the events. Animal rights activists have begun deploying drones in an attempt to disrupt live pigeon competitions. In the past, U.S. Senator Jim Inhofe held annual live pigeon shoots in Oklahoma as part of a political fundraiser. In 2015 a drone operated by an animal rights group was shot down while flying over Inhofe's fundraiser that was being held at a remote ranch. In 2017 due to protests from animal rights groups Inhofe replaced his annual live pigeon shoot with a wild dove hunt.

== Venues and championships ==
Tournaments and competition during the beginning to mid-twentieth century were worldwide. In the 1900 Paris Olympics, live pigeon shooting was one of the events. The prize for the winner was Fr20,000 (more than US$82,000 in 2017) split among the event's top four.

=== Early to mid-20th century ===
The following table shows the host cities and winners of the pigeon-shooting world championships:

Year	City	Country	Winner
1930	Rome	Italy	Ottavio Menicagli
1931	Monte Carlo	Monaco	Edward W. Renfro
1932	Paris	France	Alfred Elby
1933	San Sebastián	Spain	R. de Hemptiner
1934	Budapest	Hungary	Kalam Papp
1935	Brussels	Belgium	G. Carlier d'Oreigne
1936	Rome	Italy	Adriano Ciardi
1937	Vichy	France	Jules Merouze
1938	Namur	Belgium	Walter Warren
1939	Deauville	France	Guy Lamy
1940	Sanremo	Italy	Guilio Calestani
1948	Estoril	Portugal	Guilio Calestani
1949	Madrid	Spain	Clark Homer
1950	Sanremo	Italy	Umberto Sacchi
1951	Monte Carlo	Monaco	Clark Homer
1952	Estoril	Portugal	José Corado
1953	Vichy	France	The Count of Teba
1954	San Sebastián	Spain	Andrea Sessa
1955	Cairo	Egypt	Bill Isetts
1956	Rome	Italy	Enman Vafiadis
1957	Estoril	Portugal	Orlando Carvalho
1958	Vichy	France	Etienne Courbin
1959	Seville	Spain	Giovanni Bodini
1960	Milan	Italy	Carlo Giorgetti
1961	Barcelona	Spain	Francisco Bolinches
1962	Rome	Italy	Carlo Giorgetti
1963	Madrid	Spain	Don Mayfield
1964	Lisbon	Portugal	Pedro Rael Mena
1965	San Marino	San Marino	Guiseppe Aleo
1966	Mexico City	Mexico	León Bozzi
1967	Bologna	Italy	Maurizio Frosi
1968	Valencia	Spain	Juan Antonio Martín
1969	Lisbon	Portugal	Amilcare Bodini
1970	San Marino	San Marino	Rodolfo Cecconi
1971	Milan	Italy	Eduardo Jordao
1972	San Sebastián	Spain	Franco Bomaghi
1973	Buenos Aires	Argentina	José Passera
1974	Porto	Portugal	Bruno Pardini
1975	Bologna	Italy	John Tirelli
1976	Madrid	Spain	Charles Miller
1977	Buenos Aires	Argentina	Umberto Pelliciari
1978	Lisbon	Portugal	Bruno Pardini
1979	Milan	Italy	Andrea Ida
1980	Guadalajara	Mexico	Horacio Delfino
1981	Madrid	Spain	Francisco Montoro Cañete
1982	Madrid	Spain	Guiseppe Passalacqua
1983	Porto	Portugal	José Arques
1984	Montecatini Terme	Italy	Terzo Bertoni
1985	Guadalajara	Mexico	Giordano Tinti
1986	Buenos Aires	Mexico	Juan Pablo Toledo
1987	Elche	Spain	Filippo Ciccolo
1988	Lisbon	Portugal	Joaquim Guimares
1989	Guadalajara	Mexico	A. Pérez Fernández
1990	Cairo	Egypt	Pedro Díaz de la Peña
1991	Zaragoza	Spain	Osvaldo Cantori
1992	Málaga	Spain	Angiolino Bosio
1993	Vilamoura	Portugal	José M. Rodrigues
1994	Toluca	Mexico	Martín Orozco
1995	Málaga	Spain	Giovanni Rodenghi
1996	Pevidém	Portugal	José M. Rodríguez
1997	Madrid	Spain	Carlos Sainz
1998	Guadalajara	Mexico	Fuentes de María
1999	Elche	Spain	Gonzalo Salazar
2000	Andorra la Vella	Andorra	Francisco Rosich Martín

A brief list of some of the active venues in the 1950s:

- Estoril, Portugal - Match of Nations World Championship
- Monte Carlo, Monaco - Prix de Larvotto and Prix Gaston Rambaud
- Havana, Cuba - The Pan American Live Pigeon Championship, The Grand Prix
- Vichy, France - Grand Prix de Vichy
- Lebanon, Pennsylvania - Miller Memorial
- Hegins, Pennsylvania - Fred Coleman Memorial
- Deauville, France - Prix Roger Dubut
- Paris, France
- Rome, Italy
- Milan, Italy
- Madrid, Spain - Live Bird Championship
- San Remo, Italy
- Valencia, Spain
- Barcelona, Spain - Columbaire Championship
- Seville, Spain - Columbaire Championship
- Guadalajara, Mexico - Open Flyer Championship
- Mexico City, Mexico - World Live Pigeon Championship
- Cairo, Egypt - Match of Nations

=== In Monte Carlo: 1872 to 1960 ===
Pigeon shooting in Monaco dates back to 1872. The ring was located behind the casino and was in continuous use with live pigeons until 1960, when robotic devices went into use. Slowly, shooting faded out of fashion, and the shooting range was demolished in 1972. After the ring was demolished, a mosaic titled "From the Earth to the Sea" ("De la Terre a la Mer") was installed by Victor Vasarely.

The popularity of pigeon shooting at Monte Carlo included creation of new types of gun stocks; the "Monte Carlo" comb.

=== The Olympics ===
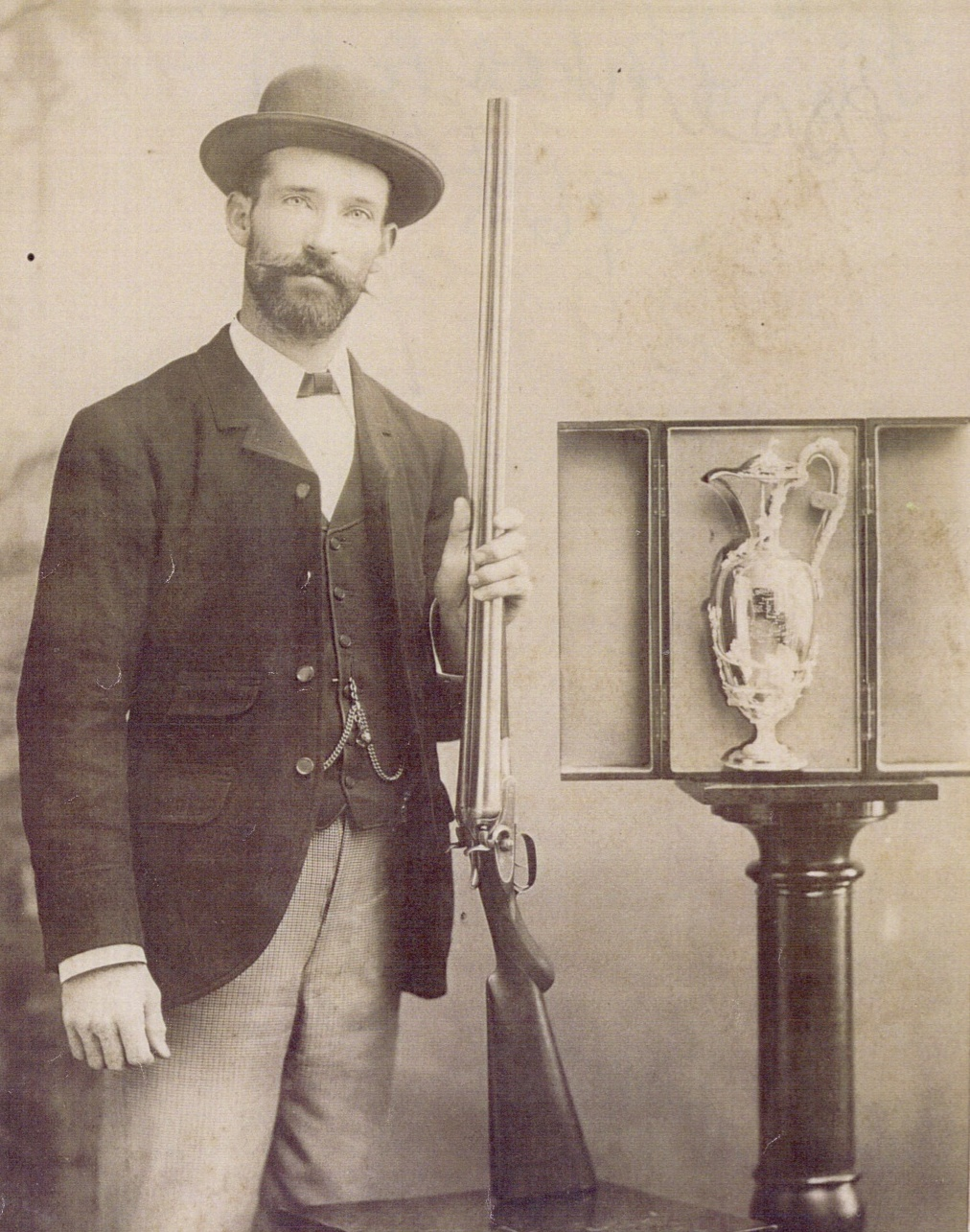
Donald Mackintosh, one of the gold medallists in pigeon shooting at the 1900 Olympics

Pigeon shooting was a part of the 1900 Olympic Games in Paris, but has not been included other times.

=== In Pennsylvania ===
Pigeon shooting in the U.S. state of Pennsylvania dates back to the mid-19th century. The Philadelphia Gun Club overlooking the Delaware River in Bensalem, Pennsylvania, is one of the oldest gun clubs in the United States. Founded in 1877 at the height of the Gilded Age the club opened to many socially prominent gentlemen and their ladies. In 1895 the club acquired the historic Bickley Mansion for use as a club house. The club currently has 61 members.

The club attracted many wealthy American sportsmen including several members of the Vanderbilt Family. William Kissam Vanderbilt II and Harry Payne Whitney who married Gertrude Vanderbilt in 1896 were both members. Edward Burd Grubb Jr. a former Union Army General, businessman and New Jersey politician who was appointed as United States Ambassador to Spain by Benjamin Harrison, and was a close associate of Woodrow Wilson was an early president of the club. In addition to the shooting range the club also had a boathouse on the river, and kennels for hunting dogs. Annie Oakley and her then employer, Buffalo Bill attended shoots at the Philadelphia Gun Club around the turn of the century.

In 1928, outdoor writer and conservationist Nash Buckingham, who contributed many articles to Field and Stream, shot his famous A.H. Fox waterfowl gun, "Bo Whoop", that had been custom built in Philadelphia by gunsmith Burt Becker at the club, as a guest of the magazine's publisher. In the 1930s and 1940s, club members and guests included notables such as writer Ernest Hemingway, who also participated in live pigeon shoots in Europe and Cuba, and Canadian jazz musician Charles Biddle.

The controversy surrounding live pigeon shoots at the Philadelphia Gun Club goes back more than a century. A club member was convicted for cruelty to animals for participating in a pigeon shoot in 1887. His conviction was eventually overturned by the Pennsylvania Supreme Court in 1891.

Pigeon shoots are also held at several other private gun clubs in Berks and Dauphin counties.

For more than half a century, a public pigeon shoot was held every Labor Day in Hegins, Pennsylvania. Held annually from 1934 to 1998, this live pigeon shoot, known as the Fred Coleman Memorial shoot, once drew around 10,000 people. It was finally called off in 1999 following years of protests by animal rights activists and a legal battle that ultimately went all the way to the Pennsylvania Supreme Court.

=== Current locations ===
- Casa de Campo, Dominican Republic
- Guadalajara, Mexico
- Spain
- Bensalem, Pennsylvania, US
- Dalmatia, Pennsylvania, US
- Hamburg, Pennsylvania, US
- Henderson, Maryland, US
- Lykens, Pennsylvania, US

== Firearms and ammunition ==
Traditionally, live pigeon shooting guns were heavier than a regular field gun (greater than 7 pounds). Characteristics of them were longer barrels (30-inch with ventilated ribs give better sight plane), tighter chokes (full/fuller), no safety, beavertail forend, single triggers, clipped fences, a third bite, chambered for 2 3/4 inch 12 gauge shells instead of the 2 1/2-inch 12-gauge shells that were commonly used for hunting in the 19th and early 20th centuries. These extra features were in place to handle the higher pressure loads used for live pigeon competitions where the bird had to be dropped inside the ring. Today, these pigeon guns command a higher premium at auction.

== Pigeons used ==
In Europe, a special breed of rock pigeon is used called a zurito (Columba oenas) (see stock dove). They are small, gray, and exceptionally fast. In the United States feral pigeons captured in urban areas such as New York City, where they are considered a nuisance, have been used as targets for live pigeon shoots.

== Animal rights criticism ==
Live pigeon shooting was once the sport of aristocrats in Britain, but was largely abandoned around the turn of the 20th century and the sport was banned in the United Kingdom in 1921. Opposition to the sport in the United States began in the late 19th century. In 1887 Women’s Humane Society and American Anti-Vivisection Society founder Caroline Earle White successfully prosecuted Philadelphia Gun Club live pigeon shooter A. Nelson Lewis. Convicted of cruelty in January 1890, Lewis appealed his case all the way to the Pennsylvania Supreme Court, which overturned his conviction, ruling in 1891 that live pigeon shoots are a form of hunting and that pigeons are game birds. As early as the first quarter of the 20th century, editorial pieces began decrying the sport. John Goodwin, director of animal cruelty policy with The Humane Society of the United States, has criticized pigeon shooting.

In the USA live pigeon shooting remains legal but the popularity of the sport has waned considerably since the mid-20th century. It is specifically prohibited by statute in 14 states and has been determined to violate the animal cruelty statutes of nine more. In Pennsylvania, where gun clubs have hosted pigeon shoots since before the Civil War, live pigeon shooting is specifically exempt from animal cruelty laws. A 2014 bill for banning pigeon shooting was opposed by the National Rifle Association of America. Legislators were apparently convinced and let the bill expire. In 2015, Pennsylvania Senator Patrick M. Browne re-introduced Senate Bill 715 to amend Title 18 (Crimes and Offenses) to further provide for the offense of animal cruelty.

== See also ==
- Clay pigeon shooting
- Trap shooting
- List of medalists at the European Shotgun Championships (European Championships of Pigeon Shooting from 1929 to 1954)
- Pigeon racing at the 1900 Summer Olympics
- Pigeon shooting at the Olympics
