= CD Loeches =

Loeches
- Full name: Club Deportivo Loeches
- Founded: 1968
- Dissolved: 2023
- Ground: Estadio Cruz de piedra, Loeches, Madrid, Spain
- Capacity: 1,500
- Chairman: (Spain) Antonio Perea
- Manager: (Spain) Francisco Pérez
- 2022–23: Tercera de Aficionados – Group 4, 10th of 18
| Home colours | Away colours |

Club Deportivo Loeches was a football club based in Loeches in the Community of Madrid. Founded in 1968, it last played in the Tercera de Aficionados – Group 4. Its stadium is Cruz de Piedra with a capacity of 1,500 seats, in Loeches.

In August 2023, CD Loeches merged with Atlético Loeches to create UD Loeches.

== Season to season ==
| Season | Tier | Division | Place | Copa del Rey |
|---|---|---|---|---|
| 1969–70 | 7 | 3ª Reg. | 11th | |
| 1970–71 | 7 | 3ª Reg. | 7th | |
| 1971–72 | 7 | 3ª Reg. | 7th | |
| 1972–73 | 7 | 3ª Reg. | 9th | |
| 1973–74 | 8 | 3ª Reg. | 6th | |
| 1974–75 | 8 | 3ª Reg. | 5th | |
| 1975–76 | 7 | 3ª Reg. P. | 10th | |
| 1976–77 | 7 | 3ª Reg. P. | 3rd | |
| 1977–78 | 7 | 2ª Reg. | 9th | |
| 1978–79 | 7 | 2ª Reg. | 8th | |
| 1979–80 | 7 | 2ª Reg. | 18th | |
| 1980–1987 | DNP | | | |
| 1987–88 | 8 | 3ª Reg. | 3rd | |
| 1988–89 | 8 | 3ª Reg. | 1st | |
| 1989–90 | 7 | 2ª Reg. | 3rd | |
| 1990–91 | 7 | 2ª Reg. | 1st | |
| 1991–92 | 6 | 1ª Reg. | 6th | |
| 1992–93 | 6 | 1ª Reg. | 1st | |
| 1993–94 | 5 | Reg. Pref. | 11th | |
| 1994–95 | 5 | Reg. Pref. | 6th | |

| Season | Tier | Division | Place | Copa del Rey |
|---|---|---|---|---|
| 1995–96 | 5 | Reg. Pref. | 10th | |
| 1996–97 | 5 | Reg. Pref. | 17th | |
| 1997–98 | 6 | 1ª Reg. | 7th | |
| 1998–99 | 6 | 1ª Reg. | 15th | |
| 1999–2000 | 7 | 2ª Reg. | 15th | |
| 2000–01 | 7 | 2ª Reg. | 17th | |
| 2001–02 | 7 | 2ª Reg. | 6th | |
| 2002–03 | 7 | 2ª Reg. | 2nd | |
| 2003–04 | 6 | 1ª Reg. | 17th | |
| 2004–05 | 7 | 2ª Reg. | 1st | |
| 2005–06 | 6 | 1ª Reg. | 2nd | |
| 2006–07 | 5 | Reg. Pref. | 6th | |
| 2007–08 | 5 | Reg. Pref. | 9th | |
| 2008–09 | 5 | Reg. Pref. | 13th | |
| 2009–10 | 5 | Pref. | 12th | |
| 2010–11 | 5 | Pref. | 6th | |
| 2011–12 | 5 | Pref. | 16th | |
| 2012–13 | 6 | 1ª Afic. | 9th | |
| 2013–14 | 6 | 1ª Afic. | 16th | |
| 2014–15 | 7 | 2ª Afic. | 1st | |

| Season | Tier | Division | Place | Copa del Rey |
|---|---|---|---|---|
| 2015–16 | 6 | 1ª Afic. | 12th | |
| 2016–17 | 6 | 1ª Afic. | 17th | |
| 2017–18 | 7 | 2ª Afic. | 14th | |
| 2018–19 | 7 | 2ª Afic. | 8th | |
| 2019–20 | 8 | 3ª Afic. | 11th | |
| 2020–21 | 8 | 3ª Afic. | 9th | |
| 2021–22 | 9 | 3ª Afic. | 8th | |
| 2022–23 | 9 | 3ª Afic. | 10th | |
