= Gentilhombres Grandes de España con ejercicio y servidumbre =

The Gentilhombres Grandes de España con ejercicio y servidumbre (Gentlemen of the Bedchamber Grandee of Spain) was a palatine class of honorary royal servants of the Royal Household and Heritage of the Crown of Spain, who were entrusted with certain functions at the service of the Monarch which they exercised by rigorous seniority.

During the reigns of the last two monarchs before the proclamation of the Second Spanish Republic, King Alfonso XII, and King Alfonso XIII, being symbolically considered as "relatives" to the King, they were always close to his chamber in all kinds of ceremonies and stayed with him inside and outside of the Palace, having lunch daily with him and being also with him at public spectacles such as the bullfights, the theatre, etc. They exercised their functions by strict daily shifts. Nevertheless, they were not employees of the Royal Household like the Mayordomos de semana and did not receive a regular salary for their service.

From the ceremonial point of view - in royal baptisms - seven of them were entrusted to deliver the sacred ornaments for the sacrament (saltcellar, water-jug, cottons, brush etc.). In the Public chapels, they always stayed at the procession that was celebrated right before the Mayordomos de semana. In official banquets and in the annual opening of the Cortes Generales (Spanish Parliament), the Gentilhombre Grande de España in service were always behind the King. With their status, they had free entrance to the Royal Palace of Madrid up to the Chamber after the Saleta and the Antechamber.

To be nominated for this class, it was necessary to not only to belong to the nobility but also to be a Grandee of Spain, and they had to be previously presented to the King in the so-called ceremony of the Cobertura (Coverage).

Their badge was a golden gilded key on a red velvet ribbon with golden bangs and the Royal Cypher of the King who nominated them embroidered also in gold. The key was placed horizontally in the waist to the right side in uniforms, dress-coat or frock coat.

They were styled Excelentísimos señores Gentilhombres Grandes de España con ejercicio y servidumbre.

The office was suppressed after the Second Spanish Republic was declared on April 14, 1931. It was not re-created after the restoration of Monarchy in November 1975.

At the office's suppression, there remained 213 Gentilhombres Grandes de España con ejercicio y servidumbre at service. Among them, the most important were the Duke of Baena, the Marquess of Velada, the Duke of Lerma, the Duke of Arión, the Count of Almodóvar, the Duke of Infantado, the Duke of la Victoria, the Duke of Alba, the Duke of Villahermosa, the Duke of Aliaga, the Duke of Medinaceli, the Count of Oropesa, the Duke of Zaragoza, the Marquess of Hoyos, the Marquess of la Cenia, the Duke of Tarancón, the Count of Plasencia, the Count of Montijo, the Duke of Pinohermoso, the Marquess of Narros, the Duke of Tamames, the Duke of Veragua, the Duke of San Pedro de Galatino, the Marquess of Atarfe, the Marquess of Quirós, the Marquess of Fontalba, the Marquess of Távara, the Count of Torre Arias, the Marquess of Lierta, the Duke of Alburquerque, the Marquess of Bondad Real, the Marquess of Viesca de la Sierra, the Duke of Lécera, the Count of Peñaranda de Bracamonte, the Count of Campo de Alange, the Duke of San Fernando de Quiroga, the Marquess of Canillejas, the Duke of Santo Mauro, the Duke of Fernán Núñez, the Marquess of Cubas, the Duke of Aveiro, the Marquess of Sentmenat, the Marquess of Urquijo, the Marquess of Vallecerrato, the Count of Peralada, the Marquess of Guadalcázar, the Duke of Medina Sidonia, the Count of Glimes, the Duke of Sevilla, the Marquess of Torneros, the Count of Mora, the Count of Güell, the Duke of Santa Elena, the Duke of Medina de las Torres, the Duke of Sanlúcar la Mayor, the Count of Floridablanca, the Count of Bilbao, the Count of Valmaseda, the Marquess of Gauna, the Marquess of las Nieves, the Count of Elda, the Marquess of Arienzo, the Marquess of Monreal, the Duke of Béjar, the Duke of Almenara Alta, the Duke of Abrantes, the Marquess of Aldama, the Marquess of Viana, the Marquess of el Vasto, the Marquess of Valdesevilla, the Count of Guadiana, the Marquess of Albudeyte, the Duke of Francavilla, the Duke of Maqueda, the Duke of Santa Cristina, the Viscount of Valoria, the Count of los Andes, the Marquess of Castel Rodrigo, the Marquess of Estella, the Baron of Segur, the Duke of Terranova, the Marquess of Povar, the Marquess of Foronda, the Duke of Rivas, the Count of Superunda, the Count of Velle, the Duke of Bournonville, the Duke of Grimaldi, the Marquess of las Torres de la Presa, the Count of Cheste, the Duke of Canalejas, the Duke of Soma, and the Count of Ruiseñada.

== See also ==
- Grandee
- List of current grandees of Spain
- Gentilhombres de cámara con ejercicio
- Mayordomo mayor
- Caballerizo mayor

== Bibliography ==
- Enciclopedia universal ilustrada europeo-americana. Volume 49. Hijos de J. Espasa, Editores.1923
- Guia Oficial de España. Sucesores de Ribadeneyra. Madrid. 1930
