= Permanent Deputation and Council of Grandees of Spain and Titles of the Kingdom =

Spanish nobility organization

- Diputación Permanente y Consejo de la Grandeza de España y Títulos del Reino
- Official coat of arms
- Formation: 15 May 1815; 211 years ago
- Founder: Ferdinand VII
- Legal status: private association of public interest
- Headquarters: 3 Ayala Street, Madrid
- Location: Spain
- Protector: Felipe VI
- Dean: The Count of Casa Galindo
- Secretary: The Baroness of Tamarit
- Treasurer: The Marquess of Vivola
- Main organ: Assembly
- Parent organization: The Crown
- Subsidiaries: Cultural Foundation of the Spanish Nobility
- Website: www.dget.es

The Permanent Deputation and Council of Grandees of Spain and Titles of the Kingdom (Spanish: Diputación Permanente y Consejo de la Grandeza de España y Títulos del Reino), before 2019 called Permanent Deputation and Council of Grandees of Spain, is a Spanish public interest association that represents the Spanish nobility. It has around 800 members, representing 40% of Spain's titled nobility.

Furthermore, in addition to representing the nobility, the Permanent Deputation and Council has the responsibility to advise the Monarch—and the Ministry of Justice—regarding the exercise of the royal prerogative of granting noble titles—or any other aristocratic honour—as well as in procedures regarding succession and reinstatement of these, and the acknowledgement of foreign and papal titles.

== Legal nature ==
Regarding its legal nature, the Council of State, on the occasion of the statutory reform proposed by the Grandees, issued an Opinion on 22 April 1999, which has proven controversial in the doctrine. Traditionally, the institution had been considered a public corporation, but the Council of State preferred to create the formula of a "mixed corporation".

The 1999 Opinion states that the Deputation and the Council enjoy a "unique nature". The Opinion specifies that the Deputation, "as it is composed of private individuals and lacks a corporate or associative structure, it is a representation of a "body"—a group of people—that has been publicly recognized and that carries out a certain activity of public interest (...) it has a unique and non-fungible character, which gives it public relevance even without converting it into a Public Law Corporation (...)". For these reasons—the Council of State continues—, the Deputation and Council must receive "in its very existence and in its internal regulation some type of external public recognition". This public recognition is made through the approval, by an Order of the Minister of Justice, of its internal rules (estatutos).

== History ==
The Permanent Deputation and Council was created in 1815 by Ferdinand VII. After the Peninsular War, on 15 May 1815, the King summoned all Grandees of Spain so they could agreed on the financial contributions that their circumstances allowed in order to alleviate the needs of the Royal Treasury. Two of them, José Miguel de Carvajal-Vargas, 2nd Duke of San Carlos and Pedro de Alcántara Álvarez de Toledo, 13th Duke of the Infantado, very close to the sovereign, were responsible for communicating the decision. The first meetings happened in June 1815. By 1817, the grandees had donated the Crown around 8,5 million reales.

At the meeting of 10 August 1815, the Duke of San Carlos was appointed its first dean. Days later, on August 14, they met again to start the works to form an exhaustive list of grandees—from Spain and the rest of the empire—, to elaborate the first internal rules (estatutos)—which received royal assent on 19 October 1815—, and to agree to meet every Friday.

During the dynastic crisis that led to three civil wars, the Deputation of Grandees remained loyal to the infant queen Isabella II and his mother, the Queen Governor Maria Christina of the Two Sicilies. During the reign of Isabella II and the Restoration, the grandees achieved great political influence, having the right to be senators (which they lost after the disestablishment of the Senate in 1923) and to have a diplomatic passport (which they lost in 1984), among other privileges.

The internal rules of the Deputation were replaced by a new ones in 1883. During the reign of Alfonso XIII, the Deputation of Grandees was included in the administrative processes of granting, succession and reinstatement of noble titles and other aristocratic dignities, being, together with the Council of State, one of the bodies to which the monarch asks for an opinion. In 1915, King Alfonso XIII granted the Deputation new internal rules and, in 1929, the Diputation was given the right to appoint a counselor in the Council of State.

During the dictatorship of Miguel Primo de Rivera, the organization proposed to integrate also the Titles of the Kingdom—those entitled nobles without the dignity of grandee—, but the fall of the monarchy in 1931 prevented this proposal from succeeding.

The Second Republic did not stop the activity of the Deputation, which continued giving—in the name of the exiled monarch—provisional succession to the noble titles. Also, they promoted the restoration of the monarchy, an activity that became complicated during the dictatorship and that divided the nobles into two: some attempted to do so from within the regime, while others, fearing reprisals, limited themselves to publish anonymous manifestos and proposals. Most of the provisional successions were ratified by the dictatorship of Francisco Franco when the monarchy—without a king—and the nobility laws were restored between 1947 and 1948. Francisco Franco also created noble titles, but most of them were suppressed in 2022.

Following the restoration of the monarchy in 1975, the Deputation promoted again the idea of integrating the Titles of the Kingdom, which was achieved in 1999, with the approval of new internal rules in an assembly chaired by King Juan Carlos I. In 2019, the Permanent Deputation and Council of Grandees of Spain was renamed as Permanent Deputation and Council of Grandees of Spain and Titles of the Kingdom.

List of deans
No.	Name	Term
1	The Duke of San Carlos	1815–1816
2	The Duke of Parque	1816–1817
3	The Count of Fuentes	1818–1819
4	The Duke of Frías	1820
5	The Duke of San Fernando de Quiroga	1823–1829
6	The Duke of Villahermosa	1829–1834
7	The Marquess of Monte Real	1834–1835
8	The Duke of Castro-Terreño	1836–1843
9	The Duke of Gor	1843–1850
10	The Duke of Frías	1850–1851
11	The Count of Altamira	1851–1859
12	The Marquess of Miraflores	1859–1862
13	The Marquess of San Felices	1862–1863
14	The Lord of Casa Rubianes	1863–1865
15	The Marquess of Vallehermoso	1865–1866
16	The Marquess of San Felices	1866–1867
17	The Marquess of Molins	1867–1877
18	The Count of Pinohermoso	1877–1883
19	The Count of Puñonrostro	1883–1890
20	The Duke of Sesto	1890–1909
21	The Duke of Veragua	1909–1910
22	The Duke of Gor	1910
23	The Duke of Tamames	1910–1917
24	The Duke of Fernán Núñez	1917–1925
25	The Duke of T'Serclaes	1926–1927
26	The Marquess of Santa Cruz	1928–1940
27	The Duke of Alba de Tormes	1941–1953
28	The Duke of the Infantado	1953–1991
29	The Duke of San Carlos	1992–1997
30	The Count of Elda	1998–2009
31	The Duke of Aliaga	2010–2018
32	The Duke of Fernández-Miranda	2018–2022
33	The Duchess of Arcos	2022–2026
34	The Count of Casa Galindo	2026–pres.

== Organization ==
The Permanent Deputation and Council of Grandees of Spain and Titles of the Kingdom is governed by two bodies: the Assembly and the Permanent Deputation and Council.

=== Assembly ===
The Assembly of Grandees and Titles of the Kingdom is integrated by those aristocrats that hold the dignity of Grandee or a noble title and are up to date with the payment of ordinary or extraordinary dues.

The assemblies are chaired by the Monarch or the member of the royal family that HM designates for this purpose. Failing this, the assembly is chaired by the Dean who, with the sovereign's authorization, calls the meetings and establishes the agenda.

=== Permanent Deputation and Council ===
The Permanent Deputation and Council of Grandees and Titles of the Kingdoms is the executive body of the Deputation. It represents the entity and it exercises the functions assigned to it by the Spanish nobility laws.

This body is composed by a Dean, who must be a Grandee, and sixteen deputy-counselors. Eight of them must be grandees and the other eight titles of the Kingdom. Also, from its members, the Permanent Deputation must appoint a Secretary and a Treasurer, and may also appoint a Deputy Dean (also a grandee).

==== Current executive council ====
As of April 2026:

1. Enrique María Lasso de la Vega y Valdenebro, 12th Count of Casa Galindo (GE). Dean.
2. María Isabel Pascual de Quinto Santos-Suárez, 9th Baroness of Tamarit. Secretary.
3. Francisco de Borja de Arteaga y Fierro, 12th Marquess of Vivola. Treasurer.
4. María Pérez de Herrasti y Urquijo, 16th Marchioness of Albayda (GE).
5. Jaime Alfonsín, 1st Marquess of Alfonsín (GE).
6. Fadrique Álvarez de Toledo y Argüelles, 14th Viscount of la Armería.
7. Francisco de Borja Montesino-Espartero y Velasco, 4th Viscount of Banderas.
8. Juan Pedro Domecq de Morenés, 5th Marquess of Grigny.
9. Fernando Fitz-James Stuart, 17th Duke of Huéscar (GE).
10. Leoncio Alonso González de Gregorio, 22nd Duke of Medina Sidonia (GE).
11. Rafael Benjumea y Benjumea, 19th Count of Peñón de la Vega.
12. Javier Benjumea Llorente, 2nd Marquess of Puebla de Cazalla.
13. José Sainz y Armada, 7th Duke of Rivas (GE).
14. José María Sanz-Magallón y Rezusta, 16th Marquess of San Adrián (GE).
15. Ana Luisa Zuleta Pérez de Guzmán, 15th Marchioness of Sardoal.
16. Hugo O'Donnell, 7th Duke of Tetuan (GE).
17. Catalina Luca de Tena y García-Conde, 2nd Marchioness of Valle de Tena (GE).

== See also ==
- List of current grandees of Spain
- List of dukes in the peerage of Spain

== Bibliography ==
- Moral Roncal, Antonio Manuel (2020). "Las Juntas y Diputación Permanente de la Grandeza de España (1815-1833): un intento de intervención política conjunta de la alta nobleza" [The Juntas and Permanent Deputation of the Grandees of Spain (1815–1833): an attempt of joint political intervention by the high nobility] (PDF). Historia y política (in Spanish). 43: 159–191. eISSN 1989-063X. ISSN 1575-0361.
