= Wedding of Alfonso XIII and Princess Victoria Eugenie =

1906 Spanish royal wedding

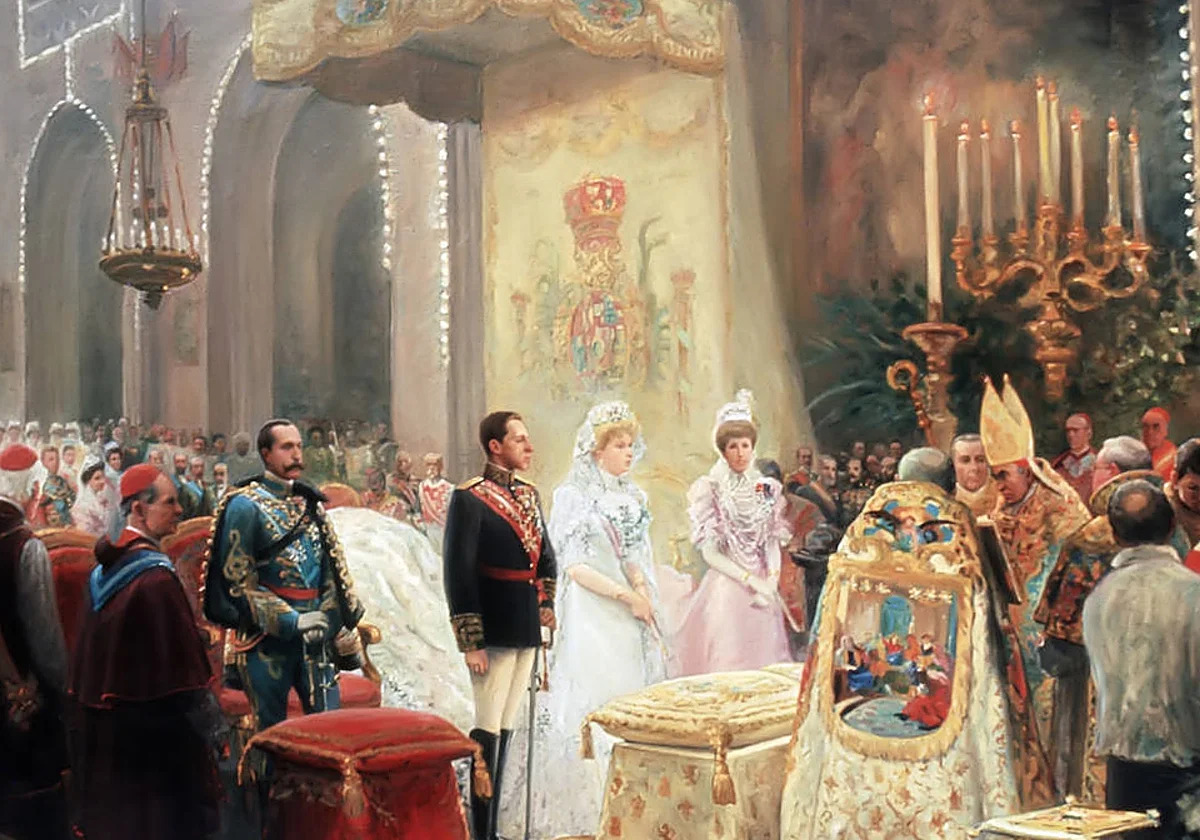
- Painting by Juan Comba
- Date: 31 May 1906; 120 years ago
- Venue: Church of Saint Jerome the Royal
- Location: Madrid, Spain
- Participants: Alfonso XIII; Princess Victoria Eugenie of Battenberg

The wedding of Alfonso XIII, King of Spain, and Princess Victoria Eugenie of Battenberg took place on Thursday, 31 May 1906, at the Church of Saint Jerome the Royal in Madrid, Spain. The groom was the reigning king of Spain since his birth and the bride was a princess from a cadet branch of the House of Hesse-Darmstadt and a granddaughter of Queen Victoria. Celebrations were overshadowed by an anarchist bomb attack during the newlyweds' return procession to the Royal Palace, which killed twenty-four people.

== Engagement ==
King Alfonso XIII and Princess Victoria Eugenie of Battenberg first met at the state banquet offered by King Edward VII –Victoria Eugenie's uncle– at Buckingham Palace to the Spanish King in his state visit to the United Kingdom in 1905. Alfonso was seated between Queen Alexandra and Princess Helena, King Edward's sister. He noticed Victoria Eugenie and asked who the dinner guest with almost white hair was. Everybody knew that King Alfonso was looking for a suitable bride and one of the strongest candidates was Princess Patricia, another niece of King Edward. As she seemed not to be impressed by the Spanish monarch, Alfonso indulged his interest in Victoria Eugenie, and so the courtship began. When Alfonso returned to Spain he frequently sent postcards to Victoria Eugenie and spoke of her approvingly. His mother, Queen María Cristina, initially did not like her son's selection, but finally agreed in January 1906.

On 22 January 1906, Victoria Eugenie and her mother Princess Beatrice arrived in Biarritz where some days later King Alfonso met them. Alfonso and his future bride conducted a chaperoned, three-day romance. Then, Alfonso took Victoria Eugenie and her mother to San Sebastián to meet Queen Maria Cristina. On 3 February, the King left San Sebastian to go to Madrid and Victoria Eugenie and her mother went to Versailles where the Princess would be instructed in the Catholic faith: as the future Queen of Spain, she agreed to convert from Anglican faith. The official reception of Victoria Eugenie into the Catholic faith took place on 5 March 1906 at Miramar Palace in San Sebastián.

The terms of the marriage were settled by two agreements, a public treaty and a private contractual arrangement. The treaty was executed between Spain and the United Kingdom in London on 7 May 1906 by their respective plenipotentiaries, the Spanish Ambassador to the Court of St James's, Don Luis Polo de Bernabé, and the British Foreign Secretary, Sir Edward Grey, Bt. Ratifications were exchanged on 23 May following.

== Wedding ==
=== Preparations ===
Alfonso gave his fiancée as a wedding gift a large fleurs-de-lis tiara, a necklace and a pair of earrings –all made of large diamonds and platinum– expressly designed by the Spanish jeweler Ansorena, as well as a necklace of large pearls who had belonged to Queen Isabel II. These jewels, in addition to others, formed the joyas de pasar collection later, which Victoria Eugenia ensured that were successively passed on to the following Queens of Spain. The wedding dress was also a gift from the groom to the bride, according to Spanish custom. It was a white dress, all lace, embroidered in silver and sprinkled with lilies, she accompanied it with a mantle that had belonged to Isabel II.

On the morning of 31 May 1906, the couple had breakfast together after hearing mass at 6:30 a.m. at the Royal Palace of El Pardo, where the Princess was staying since her arrival in Madrid on 26 May. Afterwards, the King went to the Royal Palace of Madrid and the Princess to the Ministry of the Navy to get dressed for the ceremony.

=== Procession ===
Footage at the entrance of the church by Segundo de Chomón.

At nine o'clock, a cannon shot announced the departure of the King's wedding procession from the Royal Palace, made up of forty gala carriages, in which the Royal Family, the invited foreign Royal Houses and twenty Grandees of Spain houses were riding. The latter had been invited with the only requirement of bringing a gala carriage, otherwise they would be excluded. Fifty-four houses of Grandees in Spain were consulted, of which twenty answered affirmatively. (Note: The houses of: Duke of Alba, Count of Almodóvar, Duke of Aliaga, Duke of Arión, Duke of Bailén, Duke of the Conquista, Duke of Fernán Núñez, Duke of Granada de Ega, Count of Guaqui, Count of Heredia Spínola, Duke of Lécera, Duke of Medinaceli, Duke of Montellano, Duke of Nájera, Duke of Santoña, Duke of Tamames, Marquess of Tovar, Duke of Valencia, Marquess of Valmediano and Marquess of Viana, answered affirmatively.) Although it is impossible to determine the number of spectators at the parade, ABC estimated some 400,000 attendees, while El Imparcial highlighted that 50,000 people had arrived by train to Madrid for the event. Because there was a threat of an attack, the press was prohibited from entering the church and the people of Madrid were prohibited from throwing flowers as the procession passed by.

Separately, the Princess left the Ministry of the Navy half an hour later than planned, because Prime Minister Segismundo Moret arrived late to pick her up, which worried the groom and delayed the ceremony.

=== Ceremony ===
The religious ceremony was held at the Church of Saint Jerome the Royal and was officiated by cardinal Ciriaco Sancha, Archbishop of Toledo. The most privileged seats were for the Grandees of Spain, those closest to the altar, and the members of the foreign Royal Houses, who were right behind them. The godparents were the Queen Mother María Cristina and the King's brother-in-law, Infante Carlos of Bourbon-Two Sicilies. Immediately afterwards, the ceremony moved to a facility adjacent to the church, where the act was registered in the Registry of the Civil Status of the Royal Family, by Manuel García Prieto – Minister of Grace and Justice as the Chief Notary of the Kingdom – indicating that the wedding had been communicated by the King to the Cortes and that Princess Victoria Eugenie had the permission of her uncle Edward VII. By marrying the King, Victoria Eugenie became the Queen of Spain.

=== Anarchist bomb attack ===
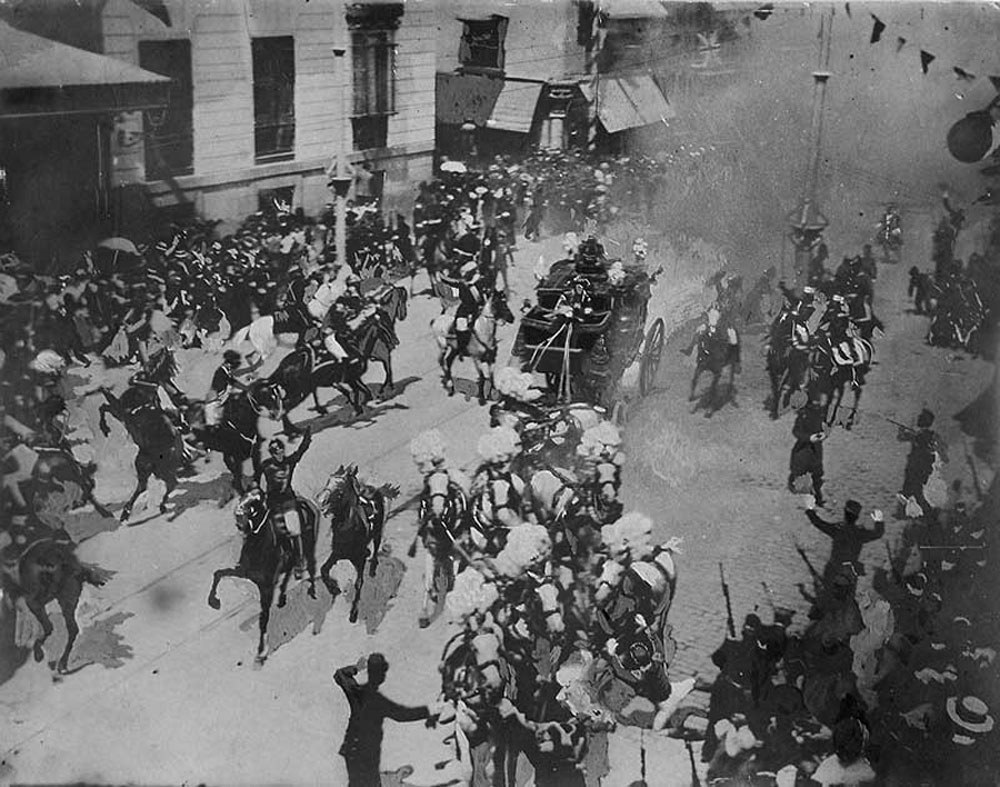
Image of the parade taken a few seconds after the bomb attack.

After the ceremony, the wedding procession returned to the Royal Palace slowly so that the crowd of people in the street could see the Royal couple. The procession passed through Paseo del Prado, Plaza de Cibeles, Calle de Alcalá, and Puerta del Sol without any incident. When passing by number 88 on Calle Mayor, (Note: Currently number 84) they suffered an attack with a bomb camouflaged in a bouquet of flowers thrown from a fourth floor balcony towards their carriage by anarchist Mateo Morral with the intention of killing them. The homemade artifact did not fully hit its target because it collided with the tram cables. Twenty-four people died among the members of the Royal Guard and bystanders, including the Marchioness of Tolosa and her daughter, who were watching the parade from a nearby balcony, and over a hundred others were wounded. The explosion did not injure either the King or the Queen or the guards who were in the carriage. The King's Golden Fleece necklace broke and his uniform tore at chest level, as a piece of the bomb entered the carriage, becoming embedded in the seat. This piece was given by Queen María Cristina to her sister-in-law Infanta Paz, who had a votive plaque created with it for Our Lady of Altötting.

After the delay caused by the confusion, the King and the Queen changed carriages and resumed their journey to the Royal Palace, where they made several appearances on the balcony under the cheers from the crowd. The Queen appeared with her dress still stained with blood from the attack.

=== Aftermath ===
The reception and banquet that was going to be held that same day at the Royal Palace was cancelled as a sign of mourning, (Note: Other historians maintain that everything went as planned and that the guests enjoyed a menu consisting of beef consommé with profiteroles stuffed with parmesan cheese, poached eggs with mushrooms, sole with hollandaise sauce, beef ribs in sherry, baked stuffed capon and for dessert, the first ever wedding cake known in Spain. The wedding cake, brought from London, weighed 300 kg (660 lb) and was made with sponge cake, icing cream and culinary perfumes, it had six sides separated by Corinthian columns and was decorated with Spanish vines made with sugar, with the royal shield, monogram and crown in its center.) and the gala ball that was scheduled for the following day was replaced by a ceremony for the memory of the victims. That same following day, the funerals of the Marchioness of Tolosa and her daughter were held, for which the King sent Mariano Fernández de Henestrosa, Duke of Santo Mauro, as his representative and the Queen sent Ventura García-Sancho, Marquess of Aguilar de Campoo, as her representative. They also sent a representation to the funerals of other victims. A monument was later erected in memory of the victims of the attack.

Despite the mourning, the rest of the celebrations continued and the King rode through the city in an open car. On 2 June following, a bullfight was held, and on 4 June, a grand ball was held at the Duchess of Fernán Núñez residence. The Royal couple had their honeymoon in the Royal Palace of La Granja de San Ildefonso.

== Bibliography ==
- Fernández de la Reguera, Ricardo; March, Susana (1969). La boda de Alfonso XIII (in Spanish). Editorial Planeta.
