= Duke of Victoria (disambiguation) =

The official translation Duke of Victoria, or literal translation Duke of the Victory, is a title created by the governments of several countries:

- Duque da Vitória, a Portuguese title of nobility, created in 1812 for the British general Arthur Wellesley
- Duke of Victoria de las Amezcoas, a Spanish title of nobility, created in 1836 for the Spanish Carlist general Tomás de Zumalacárregui
- Duke of la Victoria, a Spanish title of nobility, created in 1839 for the Spanish general Baldomero Espartero
- Duca della Vittoria, an Italian title of nobility, created in 1921 for the Italian general Armando Diaz
