= List of current grandees of Spain =

Grandees of Spain (Spanish: Grandes de España) are the highest-ranking members of the Spanish nobility. They comprise nobles who hold the most important historical landed titles in Spain or its former colonies. Many such hereditary titles are held by heads of families, having been acquired via strategic marriages between landed families.

All grandees, of which there were originally three ranks, are now deemed to be of equal status (i.e. "of the first class"); this designation is nowadays titular, conveying neither power nor legal privileges.

A grandeza (grandeeship) can be held regardless of possession of a title of nobility, however each grandeza was normally (although not always) granted in conjunction with a noble title. With the exception of Fernandina, grandezas have been granted with all Spanish ducal titles.

Grandees, their consorts and first-born heirs are entitled to the honorific prefix of "The Most Excellent" (Excelentísimo Señor (male), abbreviated Excmo. Sr., or Excelentísima Señora (female), abbreviated Excma. Sra.). In written form, their names are followed by the post-nominals GE.

The following is an incomplete list of extant Spanish noble titles that are held in conjunction with a grandeeship:

== Dukedoms ==
Title	Year of creation	Year of grandeeship conferral	Arms	Current holder	Held since
Duke of Abrantes	1642	1650		José Manuel de Zuleta y Alejandro	1997
Duke of Ahumada	1836	1836		Francisco Chico de Guzmán y Girón	1973
Duke of Alba de Tormes	1472	1520		Carlos Fitz-James Stuart y Martínez de Irujo	2015
Duke of Alburquerque	1464	1520		Juan Miguel Osorio y Bertrán de Lis	1994
Duke of Alcalá de los Gazules	1558	1558		Victoria Elisabeth de Hohenlohe-Langenburg y Schmidt-Polex	2018
Duke of la Alcudia	1792	1792		Carlos Ruspoli y Álvarez de las Asturias Bohorques	2019
Duke of Algeciras	1906	1906		Carlos López de Carrizosa y Mitjans	2015
Duke of Algete	1728	1734		Juan Miguel Osorio y Bertrán de Lis	1994
Duke of Aliaga	1487	1599		Luis Martínez de Irujo y Hohenlohe-Langenburg	2015
Duke of Almazán	1698	1830		Natalia Ruth Mariátegui y Muro	2016
Duke of Almazán de Saint Priest	1830	1830		Béatrice Marguerite Marie-Thérèse de Castellane	1998
Duke of Almenara Alta	1830	1830		María Soledad Martorell y Castillejo	1951
Duke of Almodóvar del Río	1780	1780		Alfonso de Hoyos y Fernández de Córdoba	2013
Duke of Almodóvar del Valle	1871	1871		Alfonso Martel y Fonseca	1980
Duke of Amalfi	1642	1902		Íñigo de Seoane y García	2004
Duke of Andría	1507	1904		Teresa Roca de Togores y Bustos	2010
Duke of Ánsola	1887	1887		María Cecilia Walford Hawkins y de Borbón	1989
Duke of Arco	1715	1715		Mercedes Falcó y de Anchorena	1958
Duke of Arcos	1493	1520		María Cristina de Ulloa y Solís-Beaumont	2016
Duke of Arévalo del Rey	1903	1903		Juan Pablo de Lojendio y Pardo-Manuel de Villena	2006
Duke of Arión	1725	1725		Joaquín Fernández de Córdoba y Hohenlohe-Langenburg	2014
Duke of Arjona	1902	1902		Cayetano Martínez de Irujo y FitzJames-Stuart	2013
Duke of Atrisco	1708	1708		Adelaida Barón y Carral	2004
Duke of Aveyro	1681	1681		Marta Carvajal y López-Chicheri	2024
Duke of Baena	1566	1520		María Cristina Ruiz de Arana y Marone-Cinzano	2005
Duke of Bailén	1833	1833		Francisco Javier Cavero de Carondelet y Christou	2014
Duke of Béjar	1485	1520		Pedro de Alcántara Roca de Togores y Salinas	1979
Duke of Benavente	1473	1520		Ángela María de Solís-Beaumont y Téllez-Girón	2016
Duke of Bivona	1865	1865		Manuel Falcó y Anchorena	1951
Duke of Bournonville	1717	1717		Álvaro de Silva y Mora	1977
Duke of Camiña	1619	1660		Victoria Elisabeth de Hohenlohe-Langenburg y Schmidt-Polex	2018
Duke of Canalejas	1913	1919		José Manuel Canalejas y Huertas	1997
Duke of Cánovas del Castillo	1901	1901		Fernándo Fernández de Córdoba y Hohenlohe-Langenburg	2016
Duke of Cardona	1482	1520		Casilda Ghisla Guerrero-Burgos y Fernández de Córdoba	1998
Duke of Castillejos	1871	1871		Blanca Muntadas-Prim y Desvalls	2011
Duke of Castro Enríquez	1858	1858		Sonia de Arróspide y López de Letona	1952
Duke of Castro-Terreño	1825	1847		Ana Sánchez-Navarro y Quintana	2010
Duke of Ciudad Real	1613	1888		Alexander Gonzalo de Hohenlohe-Langenburg y Schmidt-Polex	2018
Duke of Ciudad Rodrigo	1812	1812		Charles Wellesley	2010
Duke of la Conquista	1847	1847		Alfonso Miguel de Egaña y Huerta	2018
Duke of Dato	1921	1921		María del Pilar Espinosa de los Monteros y Sainz-Tovar	2014
Duke of Denia	1882	1882		Victoria Elisabeth de Hohenlohe-Langenburg y Schmidt-Polex	2018
Duke of Dúrcal	1885	1885		María Cristina Patiño y Borbón	2003
Duke of Elío	1875	1875		Inés de Elío y Gaztelu	2003
Duke of Escalona	1472	1520		Francisco de Borja de Soto y Moreno-Santamaría	1998
Duke of Estremera	1568	1913		María de la Asunción de Bustos y Marín	1973
Duke of Feria	1567	1567		Rafael de Medina y Abascal	2002
Duke of Fernán Núñez	1817	1817		Manuel Falcó y Anchorena	1951
Duke of Fernández-Miranda	1977	1977		Enrique Fernández-Miranda y Lozana	1981
Duke of Francavilla	1555	1555		Jaime de Arteaga y Martín	1966
Duke of Frías	1492	1520		Francisco de Borja Soto y Moreno-Santa María	1999
Duke of Galisteo	1871	1871		Juan José Mesía y Medina	2017
Duke of Gandía	1485	1520		Ángela María de Ulloa y Solís-Beaumont	2016
Duke of Gor	1803	1803		Mauricio Álvarez de las Asturias-Bohorques y Silva	1963
Duke of Granada de Ega	1729	1729		Juan Alfonso Martos y Azlor de Aragón	1990
Duke of Grimaldi	1777	1777		José Joaquín Márquez y Pries	2000
Duke of Hernani	1914	1914		Margarita de Borbón y Borbón	1981
Duke of Híjar	1483	1599		Alfonso Martínez de Irujo y Fitz-James Stuart	2013
Duke of Hornachuelos	1868	1868		José Ramón de Hoces y Elduayen	2004
Duke of Huéscar	1563	1909		Fernando Juan Fitz-James Stuart y Solís	2016
Duke of Huete	1474	1909		Alfonso de Bustos y Donate	1997
Duke of Infantado	1475	1520		Almudena Arteaga y del Álcazar	2018
Duke of las Torres	1907	1907		Mónica de Figueroa y Cernuda	2016
Duke of Lécera	1493	1599		Leticia de Silva y Allende	2007
Duke of Lerma	1599	1520		Fernando Larios y Fernández de Córdoba	2000
Duke of Linares	1667	1667		Álvaro Zuleta de Reales y Ansaldo	1999
Duke of Liria and Jérica	1707	1707		Carlos Fitz-James Stuart y Martínez de Irujo	2015
Duke of Lugo	1995	1995		Elena de Borbón y Grecia	1995
Duke of Luna	1495	1895		Javier Azlor de Aragón y Ramírez de Haro	2015
Duke of Mandas y Villanueva	1614	1884		Ricardo Ignacio Rafael de la Huerta y Ozores	2002
Duke of Maqueda	1529	1529		María del Pilar Paloma de Casanova-Cárdenas y Barón	2011
Duke of Marchena	1885	1885		Juan Jacobo Walford-Hawkins y Borbón	2000
Duke of Maura	1930	1930		Ramiro Pérez-Maura y de la Peña	2003
Duke of Medina de las Torres	1625	1625		José María Ruiz de Bucesta y Osorio de Moscoso	1980
Duke of Medina de Rioseco	1538	1520		María Asunción Latorre y Téllez-Girón	1981
Duke of Medina Sidonia	1380	1520		Leoncio Alonso González de Gregorio y Álvarez de Toledo	2008
Duke of Medinaceli	1479	1520		Victoria Elisabeth de Hohenlohe-Langenburg y Schmidt-Polex	2017
Duke of Miranda	1664	1765		Javier de Silva y Mendaro	2000
Duke of Moctezuma de Tultengo	1627	1766		Juan José Marcilla de Teruel-Moctezuma y Valcárcel	2014
Duke of Montalto	1507	1919		Ricardo de Bustos y Martorell	2004
Duke of Montealegre	1633	1927		Isidro Castillejo y Bermúdez de Castro	1995
Duke of Monteleón	1527	1613		José María Pignatelli de Aragón y Burgos	1996
Duke of Montellano	1705	1705		Carla Pía Falcó y Medina	1976
Duke of Montemar	1735	1735		Tatiana Osorio de Moscoso y Sánchiz	1987
Duke of Montoro	1660	1660		Eugenia Martínez de Irujo y FitzJames-Stuart	1994
Duke of Nájera	1482	1520		Juan Travesedo y Colón de Carvajal	2000
Duke of Nemi	1828	1786		Giovanni Angelo Theodoli-Braschi	1990
Duke of Noblejas	1829	1829		Antonio de Egaña y Barrenechea	2019
Duke of Nochera	1656	1922		Filippo Balbo Bertone di Sambuy	2005
Duke of Olivares	1625	1625		Carlos Fitz-James Stuart y Martínez de Irujo	2015
Duke of Osuna	1562	1562		Ángela María de Solís-Beaumont y Téllez-Girón	2016
Duke of Palata	1646	1986		Alfonso de Urzaiz y Azlor de Aragón	1989
Duke of Parcent	1914	1709		Juan Granzow de la Cerda y Roca de Togores	2014
Duke of Parque	1780	1780		María Rosa Osorio y Malcampo	2006
Duke of Pastrana	1572	1572		José María de la Blanca Finat y Bustos	2001
Duke of Peñaranda de Duero	1608	1608		Jacobo Hernando Fitz-James Stuart y Gómez	1971
Duke of Pinohermoso	1907	1907		Alfonso María de Barrera y Pérez de Seoane	2010
Duke of Plasencia	1476	1520		María de Gracia de Solís-Beaumont y Téllez-Girón	1974
Duke of Prim	1871	1871		María de los Ángeles Muntadas-Prim y Lafita	2019
Duke of Regla	1859	1859		Justo Fernández del Valle y Cervantes	1996
Duke of Riánsares	1844	1844		María de la Consolación Muñoz y Santa Marina	2009
Duke of Rivas	1793	1793		José Sainz y Armada	2005
Duke of la Roca	1793	1769		Jacobo Hernando Fitz-James Stuart y Gómez	1983
Duke of Rubí	1920	1920		Valeriano Weyler y González	1986
Duke of San Carlos	1780	1780		Álvaro Fernández de Villaverde y Silva	1988
Duke of San Fernando de Quiroga	1815	1815		Rafael Ignacio Melgarejo y de la Peña	2001
Duke of San Fernando Luis	1816	1816		Antoine de Lévis-Mirepoix	1985
Duke of San Lorenzo de Valhermoso	1794	1794		María Cristina Osorio y Malcampo	2006
Duke of San Miguel	1625	1721		Juan Bautista Castillejo y Oriol	1975
Duke of San Pedro de Galatino	1621	1679		Teresa de Medinilla y Bernales	1983
Duke of Sanlúcar la Mayor	1625	1625		María Cristina Ruiz de Arana y Marone	2000
Duke of Santa Cristina	1830	1830		Miguel Márquez y Osorio	1999
Duke of Santa Elena	1917	1917		Alfonso Gonzalo de Borbón y Sánchiz	1995
Duke of Santángelo	1497	1520		Luis María Gonzaga de Casanova-Cárdenas y Barón	1980
Duke of Santisteban del Puerto	1738	1696		Victoria Medina y Conradi	2011
Duke of Santo Buono	1958	1958		Juan Pedro del Alcázar y Gómez-Acebo	1999
Duke of Santo Mauro	1890	1890		Álvaro Fernández-Villaverde y Silva	2009
Duke of Santoña	1875	1875		Juan Manuel Mitjans y Domecq	1968
Duke of Segorbe	1469	1520		Ignacio Medina y Fernández de Córdoba	1969
Duke of Seo de Urgel	1891	1891		Arsenio Vilallonga y Martínez de Campos	1996
Duke of Sessa	1507	1520		Gonzalo Barón y Gavito	1975
Duke of Seville	1823	1823		Francisco de Paula de Borbón y Escasany	1968
Duke of Solferino	1717	1717		Carlos Luis Llanza y Domecq	1972
Duke of Soma	1502	1520		José María Ruiz de Bucesta y Osorio de Moscoso	1976
Duke of Soria	1370	1981		Margarita de Borbón y Borbón	1981
Duke of Sotomayor	1703	1703		Carlos Martínez de Irujo y Crespo	2012
Duke of Suárez	1981	1981		Alejandra Romero y Suárez	2014
Duke of Sueca	1804	1804		Luis Carlos Ruspoli y Sánchiz	2018
Duke of T'Serclaes	1856	1705		José María Pérez de Guzmán y Martínez de Campos	2001
Duke of Talavera de la Reina	1914	1914		Álvaro de Silva y Mazorra	1990
Duke of Tamames	1805	1805		José Luis Mesía y Figueroa	1971
Duke of Tarancón	1847	1847		Juan Parra y Villate	2012
Duke of Tarifa	1886	1886		Victoria Elisabeth de Hohenlohe-Langenburg y Schmidt-Polex	2018
Duke of Terranova	1502	1893		Gonzalo de la Cierva y Moreno	1984
Duke of Tetuán	1860	1860		Hugo O'Donnell y Duque de Estrada	2005
Duke of la Torre	1862	1862		Carlos Martínez de Campos y Carulla	2001
Duke of Tovar	1906	1906		Alfonso Figueroa y Melgar	1969
Duke of Uceda	1610	1610		Pilar Latorre y Téllez-Girón	1981
Duke of la Unión de Cuba	1847	1847		Rocío Bernaldo de Quirós y Coca	1983
Duke of Valencia	1847	1847		Abigaíl Narváez y Rodríguez-Arias	2016
Duke of la Vega	1557	1557		Ángel Colón de Carvajal y Mandalúniz	2011
Duke of Veragua	1537	1537		Cristóbal Colón de Carvajal y Gorosábel	1986
Duke of la Victoria	1839	1839		Pablo Montesino-Espartero y Velasco	2011
Duke of Victoria de las Amezcoas	1836	1836		Francisco Javier de Oraá y Moyua	1984
Duke of Villahermosa	1476	1520		Álvaro de Urzaiz y Azlor de Aragón	1997
Duke of Vista Alegre	1876	1876		Fernando María Sánchez de Toca y Martín	2007
Duke of Vistahermosa	1879	1879		Cristóbal García-Loygorri y Urzaiz	2010
Duke of Zaragoza	1834	1848		Manuel Álvarez de Toledo y Mencos	1991

== Marquessates ==
Title	Year of creation	Year of grandeeship conferral	Arms	Current holder	Held since
Marquess of Aguilar de Campoo	1482	1520		María del Pilar de las Morenas y Travesedo	2011
Marquess of Albayda	1605	1771		María Pérez de Herrasti y Urquijo	2020
Marquess of Albudeyte	1711	1910		José Ramón de la Lastra y Rubio	1976
Marquess of Alcañices	1533	1626		Juan Miguel Osorio y Bertrán de Lis	1994
Marquess of Alcedo	1891	1925		María Magdalena Christophersen y Vela	1985
Marquess of Aldama	1893	1922		José María Castillejo y Oriol	1978
Marquess of Alfonsín	2025	2025		Jaime Alfonsín, 1st Marquess of Alfonsín	2025
Marquess of Alhucemas	1911	1913		Manuel Sainz de Vicuña y Melgarejo	2015
Marquess of Apezteguía	1891	1893		María Parladé e Ibarra	2016
Marquess of Argüelles	1897	1925		Manuel Ignacio Ibáñez y Bernaldo de Quirós	1988
Marquess of Arienzo	1558	1734		Fernando de Soto y Falcó	2001
Marquess of Ariza	1611	1721		Iván de Arteaga y del Alcázar	2016
Marquess of Astorga	1465	1520		María del Pilar Paloma de Casanova-Cárdenas y Barón	2013
Marquess of Atarfe	1902	1902		Francisco Javier Méndez de Vigo y Mendes de Vasconcelos	2018
Marquess of Ayerbe	1750	1790		Joao Jaime Jordán de Urriés y Serras	2018
Marquess of Aytona	1581	1670		Victoria Elisabeth de Hohenlohe-Langenburg y Schmidt-Polex	2018
Marquess of Balbases	1621	1621		Miguel Osorio y Nicolás-Correa	1997
Marquess of Bárboles	1647	1786		Pilar Benítez y Guadarrama	1986
Marquess of Bedmar	1614	1706		Julio de Heredia y Halcón	1985
Marquess of Benalúa	1844	1883		Joaquín Fominaya y Escrivá de Romaní	2019
Marquess of Benamejí	1675	1815		Manuel de la Lastra y Marcos	1984
Marquess of Bendaña	1692	1843		Lorenzo Piñeiro y Escrivá de Romaní	2011
Marquess of Benemejís de Sistallo	1762	1816		Ana Iturralde y Roland	2007
Marquess of Bondad Real	1866	1866		Jaime Bertrán de Lis y Larrea	1998
Marquess of Bosch de Arés	1689	1897		María Anunciada José de Borbón y Rojas	1994
Marquess of Cáceres	1736	1875		Juan María Noguera y Merle	1980
Marquess of Camarasa	1543	1640		Victoria Elisabeth de Hohenlohe-Langenburg y Schmidt-Polex	2018
Marquess of Campo Real	1679	1795		Luis Guillermo Perinat y Elío	1965
Marquess of Canillejas	1696	1878		Ricardo Duque de Estrada y Herrero	1953
Marquess of Cañete	1530	1771		Ana Rosa de Queralt y Aragón	2009
Marquess of Carpio	1559	1640		Carlos Fitz-James Stuart y Martínez de Irujo	2015
Marquess of Casa Ferrandell	1790	1803		Natalia Maroto de Mesa	2016
Marquess of Casa Irujo	1803	1890		Carlos Martínez de Irujo y Crespo	1979
Marquess of Casa Pontejos	1728	1916		Manuel Álvarez de Toledo y Mencos	2018
Marquess of Castel-Moncayo	1682	1790		Manuel Falcó y Girod	2020
Marquess of Castel-Rodrigo	1598	1600		Filippo Balbo Bertone di Sambuy y Wagnière	2005
Marquess of Castelar	1693	1736		Alfonso Patiño y Muguiro	1987
Marquess of Castelldosríus	1696	1701		Ágatha Ruiz de la Prada y Sentmenat	2010
Marquess of Castellones	1868	1893		Alfonso Losada y Panalva	1983
Marquess of Castellbell	1702	1924		John Alfonso de Vilallonga y Scott-Ellis	2008
Marquess of Castromonte	1663	1698		Inés Ruiz de Arana y Marone Cinzano	2005
Marquess of Cenete	1491	1909		Mencía López-Becerra y Casanova-Cárdenas	1992
Marquess of Cenia	1871	1882		María Dolores Cotoner y Quirós	1991
Marquess of Cerralbo	1533	1780		Fernando de Aguilera y Narváez	1982
Marquess of Comillas	1878	1881		Juan Alfonso Güell y Martos	1958
Marquess of Corvera	1685	1875		José Finat y de Bustos	1957
Marquess of Coscojuela	1647	1727		Carlos de Llanza y Domecq	1966
Marquess of Duero	1849	1849		José Manuel Zuleta y Alejandro	1997
Marquess of Eslava	1927	1927		Isabel Londáiz y Mencos	2021
Marquess of Estella	1877	1923		Fernando María Primo de Rivera y Oriol	1972
Marquess of Estepa	1543	1729		Francisco de Borja de Arteaga y Martín	1966
Marquess of Esteva de las Delicias	1833	1866		José Antonio Autrán y Castel	2019
Marquess of Fontalba	1894	1910		Luis de Arcos y van Reck	2009
Marquess of Gramosa	1662	1741		Enrique de Queralt y Aragón	1998
Marquess of Guad-el-Jelú	1860	1860		Ignacio Sangro y Colón	1989
Marquess of Guadalcázar	1609	1781		María Asunción de Salamanca y Lafitte	2005
Marquess of La Habana	1857	1864		Roberto Luis Sánchez de Ocaña y Chamorro	2012
Marquess of Heredia	1833	1833		Alfonso González de Regueral y González	2021
Marquess of Hoyos	1866	1866		María Isabel de Hoyos y Martínez de Irujo	1996
Marquess of Irache	1448	1710		José María Villanova-Rattazzi y Guillén	2000
Marquess of Jabalquinto	1617	1835		Ángela María de Solís-Beaumont y Téllez-Girón	2016
Marquess of Laconi	1605	1705		María del Pilar de Castellví y Busquets	1995
Marquess of la Laguna	1864	1882		Jacobo Hernando Fitz-James Stuart y Gómez	1982
Marquess of la Lapilla	1643	1780		Juan Pedro de Soto y Martorell	1987
Marquess of Lede	1633	1721		Luis Alfonso Pérez de Guzmán y Careaga	1970
Marquess of Leganés	1627	1634		Gonzalo Barón y Gavito	1975
Marquess of Lozoya	1686	1976		María Dominica de Contreras y López de Ayala	1980
Marquess of Malferit	1690	1803		Marta Garrigues y Mercader	2014
Marquess of Mancera	1623	1692		Marina Fernández de Córdoba y Hohenlohe-Langenburg	2014
Marquess of Marañón	1987	1987		Gregorio Marañón y Bertrán de Lis	2002
Marquess of Martínez de Campos	1902	1902		Arsenio María Vilallonga y Casaus	2013
Marquess of la Mina	1681	1748		Manuel Falcó y Anchorena	1956
Marquess of Miraflores	1817	1819		Manuel Álvarez de Toledo y Mencos	1991
Marquess of Miravalles	1875	1881		Luis de Parrella y Ochoa	2011
Marquess of Molins	1848	1863		Luis Roca de Togores y Bruguera	1985
Marquess of Mondéjar	1512	1724		Iñigo Alfonso Cotoner y Martos	1997
Marquess of Monreal	1683	1795		Alejandro de Santisteban y del Alcázar	2012
Marquess of Montealegre	1626	1698		Cristóbal Pérez del Pulgar y Morenés	1982
Marquess of Mortara	1614	1767		Francisco de Asís Moreno y Landahl	2004
Marquess of Mos	1685	1776		Rafael Pérez-Blanco y Pernas	1979
Marquess of Narros	1685	1866		Álvaro Urzáiz y Azlor de Aragón	2006
Marquess of Nervión	1864	1864		Alberto Mencos y Valdés	1974
Marquess of Pacheco	1903	1903		Jaime de Figueroa y Cernuda	2006
Marquess of Peñaflor	1664	1773		María Teresa Mariátegui y Gómez-Elegido	2013
Marquess of Perales del Río	1727	1855		María de los Ángeles Fernández-Durán y Roca de Togores	1990
Marquess of Pescara	1442	1928		José Ángel Martínez y Sanchiz	2020
Marquess of Portago	1744	1909		Theodora Cabeza de Vaca y Spier	2013
Marquess of Pozo Rubio	1887	1910		Álvaro Fernández-Villaverde y Silva	1989
Marquess of Priego	1501	1520		Victoria Elisabeth de Hohenlohe-Langenburg y Schmidt-Polex	2018
Marquess of Puebla de los Infantes	1716	1771		María López de Carrizosa y Mitjans	2018
Marquess of la Puente	1891	1891		Verónica Fernández de Córdoba y Aznar	1995
Marquess of Quintanar	1714	1851		Antonio Gallego de Chaves y Escudero	1976
Marquess of Quirós	1906	1906		Iván Bernaldo de Quirós y Álvarez de las Asturias-Bohorques	1997
Marquess of Rafal	1636	1790		Fernando Pardo-Manuel de Villena y de L'Epine	2015
Marquess of la Rambla	1682	1819		Elena Meneses de Orozco y Gallego de Chaves	1990
Marquess of Ría de Ribadeo	2002	2002		Leopoldo Calvo-Sotelo e Ibáñez-Martín	2010
Marquess of Riscal	1708	1928		María Belén Hurtado de Amézaga y Armada	1961
Marquess of la Romana	1739	1817		Diego del Alcázar y Silvela	1996
Marquess of Roncali	1867	1868		Ignacio de Bertodano e Higuera	1952
Marquess of Salar	1693	1834		Juan Francisco Martínez de las Rivas y Maroto	2013
Marquess of San Adrián	1729	1802		José María Sanz-Magallón y Resusta	2002
Marquess of San Felices	1693	1780		María de la Concepción Azlor de Aragón y Guillamas	1962
Marquess of San Fernando	1806	1817		Pedro Tous de Monsalve y Ceballos-Zúñiga	2000
Marquess of San Juan de Piedras Albas	1690	1691		José María de Narváez y Muguiro	1997
Marquess of San Vicente	1694	1771		Matilde Antequera y Jordán de Urríes	2019
Marquess of San Vicente del Barco	1629	1771		Fernando José Martínez de Irujo y Fitz-James Stuart	1994
Marquess of Santa Cristina	1887	1891		Manuel Allendesalazar y de la Cierva	1984
Marquess of Santa Cruz	1569	1583		Álvaro Fernández-Villaverde y Silva	2009
Marquess of Santa María de Silvela	1893	1922		Irena Silvela de la Viesca y de Pfefferie	1973
Marquess of Santillana	1445	1921		Almudena de Arteaga y del Alcázar	2018
Marquess of Sentmenat	1699	1880		Joaquín Sagnier y de Sentmenat	1994
Marquess of Sierra Bullones	1860	1860		Carmen Travesedo y Colón de Carvajal	1979
Marquess of Silvela	1915	1915		Victoria Silvela y Faget	2017
Marquess of Soidos	1785	1787		Francisco José Cabello y Suárez-Guanes	2011
Marquess of Sollerich	1770	1783		Fausto Morell y Orlandis	2004
Marquess of Sotomayor	1774	1850		Alberto de Ribed y Zarauz	2001
Marquess of Squilache	1891	1910		María de Borbón y Rojas	2019
Marquess of Távara	1541	1729		Almudena de Arteaga y del Alcázar	2018
Marquess of la Torrecilla	1688	1875		Victoria Elisabeth de Hohenlohe-Langenburg y Schmidt-Polex	2018
Marquess of Torres de la Pressa	1680	1859		Miguel Lasso de la Vega y Porres	1997
Marquess of Urquijo	1871	1913		Victoria Urquijo y Caruncho	2023
Marquess of Valdecilla	1916	1927		Ignacio Cantarrana y Ugarte	2012
Marquess of Valdeolmos	1689	1908		Fernando Maldonado y Vidal	2011
Marquess of Valdeterrazo	1864	1893		Francisco Goicoerrotea y Sarri	1983
Marquess of Valenzuela de Tahuarda	1924	1983		Rafael de Valenzuela y Teresa	1997
Marquess of Valle de Tena	2003	2003		Catalina Luca de Tena y García-Conde	2018
Marquess of Vallecerrato	1612	1780		María Cristina Fernández de Villavicencio y Eleta	2020
Marquess of Vallehermoso	1679	1790		Enrique de Queralt y Chávarri	1993
Marquess of Valparaíso	1632	1721		Gonzalo Fernández de Córdoba y Delgado	2016
Marquess of Vasto	1521	1535		Hipólito Sanchiz y Álvarez de Toledo	1997
Marquess of Velada	1557	1614		María del Carmen Allendesalazar y Ruiz de Arana	2018
Marquess of los Vélez	1507	1535		Leoncio Alonso González de Gregorio y Álvarez de Toledo	2010
Marquess of Vellisca	1646	1771		María Consuelo Pardo-Manuel de Villena y Verástegui	1950
Marquess of Viana	1875	1893		Jacobo Hernando Fitz-James Stuart y Gómez	1982
Marquess of Villadarias	1690	1760		Carlos Fernández de Henestrosa y Argüelles	1980
Marquess of Villafranca del Bierzo	1486	1623		Leoncio Alonso González de Gregorio y Álvarez de Toledo	2010
Marquess of Villamagna	1624	1859		Magdalena Mélida y de la Cruz	1997
Marquess of Villanueva de Duero	1740	1790		Fernando Ramírez de Haro y Aguirre	2000
Marquess of Villapanés	1700	1817		Gabriel Squella y Duque de Estrada	2020
Marquess of Villasor	1594	1723		Álvaro Fernández-Villaverde y Silva	2009

== Countships ==
Title	Year of creation	Year of grandeeship conferral	Arms	Current holder	Held since
Count of Aguilar de Inestrillas	1475	1640		Agustín de Carvajal y Fernández de Córdoba	1967
Count of Alba de Liste	1459	1641		Rafael Luis Carrión y Martorell	2020
Count of Alcubierre	1909	1909		Alfonso Escrivá de Romaní y Vereterra	1983
Count of Alcudia	1663	1790		María de Fátima Bernaldo de Quirós y Álvarez de las Asturias Bohorques	2013
Count of Almodóvar	1791	1875		Camilo Javier Juliá y Díez de Rivera	2018
Count of Altamira	1455	1613		Gonzalo Barón y Gavito	1975
Count of Santa Gadea	1587	1599		Victoria Elisabeth de Hohenlohe-Langenburg y Schmidt-Polex	2018

== Viscountcies ==
Title	Date of creation	Year of grandeeship conferral	Arms	Current holder	Held since
Viscount of la Alborada	1849	1907		Florencio Fernando Gavito y González	2020
Viscount of Castillo de Almansa	1773	2002		José Fernando de Almansa y Moreno-Barreda	1970

== Baronies ==
Title	Date of creation	Year of grandeeship conferral	Arms	Current holder	Held since
Baron of Llaurí	1863	1950		Verónica Manglano y Puig	2012
Baron of Viver	1901	1925		Darío Joaquín Olaortúa y Rumeu	2013

== Lordships ==
Title	Date of creation	Year of grandeeship conferral	Arms	Current holder	Held since
Lord of Casa Lazcano	1780	1780		Almudena Arteaga y del Alcázar	2018
Lord of Casa Rubianes	1535	1761		Beatriz Ozores y Rey	2009

== Individual ==
There are 7 non-title attached grandeeships that are individual. These are still hereditary and transmissible just like regular titles.

Title	Year of grandeeship conferral	Arms	Current holder	Held since
Grandee of Spain	1640		Michel de Ligne	2009
Grandee of Spain	1707		Mariana de Fontcuberta y Juncadella	2002
Grandee of Spain	1817		Ramón de Sarriera y Fernández de Muniaín	1987
Grandee of Spain	1903		Jaime María Mariátegui y Valdés	2002
Grandee of Spain	1919		Juan María Güell y Martos	1981
Grandee of Spain	1920		Luis Morenés y Sánchiz	2000

== Royal grandees ==
There are also 25 non-title attached grandeeships that correspond to the offspring of Infantes of Spain. These are not hereditary or transmissible.

Title	Year of grandeeship conferral	Arms	Current holder	Held since
Grandee of Spain	1937		Princess Teresa, Duchess of Salerno	1937
Grandee of Spain	1940		Princess Inés, Duchess of Syracuse	1940
Grandee of Spain	1941		Victoria Eugenia Marone-Cinzano y Borbón	1941
Grandee of Spain	1943		Giovanna Paola Marone-Cinzano y Borbón	1943
Grandee of Spain	1943		Olimpia Torlonia y Borbón	1943
Grandee of Spain	1945		María Teresa Marone-Cinzano y Borbón	1945
Grandee of Spain	1948		Anna Alessandra Marone-Cinzano y Borbón	1948
Grandee of Spain	1966		Princess Cristina of Bourbon-Two Sicilies	1966
Grandee of Spain	1967		Princess María Paloma, Archduchess of Austria	1967
Grandee of Spain	1968		Prince Pedro, Duke of Calabria	1968
Grandee of Spain	1968		Simoneta Gómez-Acebo y Borbón	1968
Grandee of Spain	1969		Juan Filiberto Nicolás Gómez-Acebo y Borbón	1969
Grandee of Spain	1971		Princess Inés of Bourbon-Two Sicilies	1971
Grandee of Spain	1971		Bruno Alejandro Gómez-Acebo y Borbón	1971
Grandee of Spain	1973		Luis Beltrán Alfonso Gómez-Acebo y Borbón	1973
Grandee of Spain	1973		Alfonso Carlos Zurita y Borbón	1973
Grandee of Spain	1974		Fernando Humberto Gómez-Acebo y Borbón	1974
Grandee of Spain	1975		María Zurita y Borbón	1975
Grandee of Spain	1976		Princess Victoria of Bourbon-Two Sicilies	1976
Grandee of Spain	1998		Felipe Froilán de Marichalar y Borbón	1998
Grandee of Spain	1999		Juan Urdangarin y Borbón	1999
Grandee of Spain	2000		Victoria de Marichalar y Borbón	2000
Grandee of Spain	2000		Pablo Nicolás Urdangarin y Borbón	2000
Grandee of Spain	2002		Miguel Urdangarin y Borbón	2002
Grandee of Spain	2005		Irene Urdangarin y Borbón	2005

== See also ==
- Grandee
- Permanent Deputation and Council of Grandees of Spain and Titles of the Kingdom
- Spanish nobility
- Hidalgo (nobility)
- Boletín Oficial del Estado

== Bibliography ==
- Hidalgos de España, Real Asociación de (2018). Elenco de Grandezas y Títulos Nobiliarios Españoles. Ediciones Hidalguía. ISBN 978-84-94841-02-6.
