= Duke of Algeciras =

Dukedom of Spain

- Creation date: 31 December 1906
- Created by: Alfonso XIII
- Peerage: Peerage of Spain
- First holder: Isabel Gutiérrez de Castro y Cossío, 1st Duchess of Algeciras
- Present holder: Carlos López de Carrizosa y Mitjans, 4th Duke of Algeciras
- Subsidiary titles: Marquess of Puebla de los Infantes; Marquess of Zornoza

Duke of Algeciras (Spanish: Duque de Algeciras), is a hereditary title of Spanish nobility, accompanied by the dignity of Grandee. It was granted to Isabel Gutiérrez de Castro y Cossío in 1906 by Alfonso XIII. The title was created to honor the first duchess's late son, Juan Manuel Sánchez y Gutiérrez de Castro, Duke consort of Almodóvar del Río, minister of state and chairman of the Algeciras Conference.

The title makes reference to the municipality of Algeciras, near the Strait of Gibraltar.

== Dukes of Algeciras ==
1. Isabel Gutiérrez de Castro y Cossío, 1st Duchess of Algeciras (1906-1907)
2. María de las Mercedes de Hoyos y Sánchez, 2nd Duchess of Algeciras (1904-1981)
3. Ricardo López de Carrizosa y de Hoyos, 3rd Duke of Algeciras (1983-2013)
4. Carlos López de Carrizosa y Mitjans, 4th Duke of Algeciras (since 2015)

== Line of succession ==
- Isabel Gutiérrez de Castro y Cossío, 1st Duchess of Algeciras (1822–1907)
  - Juan Manuel Sánchez y Gutiérrez de Castro, Duke consort of Almodóvar del Río (1850-1906)
    - Isabel María de la Concepción Sánchez y de Hoces, 9th Marchioness of Puebla de los Infantes (1875-1943)
      - María de las Mercedes de Hoyos y Sánchez, 2nd Duchess of Algeciras (1904–1981)
        - Ricardo López de Carrizosa y de Hoyos, 3rd Duke of Algeciras, 11th Marquess of Puebla de los Infantes, 4th Marquess of Zornoza (1932–2013)
          - Carlos López de Carrizosa y Mitjans, 4th Duke of Algeciras, 12th Marquess of Puebla de los Infantes, 5th Marquess of Zornoza (b. 1959)

== See also ==
- List of dukes in the peerage of Spain
- List of current grandees of Spain
