= Duke of Rivas =

Dukedom of Spain

Dukedom of Rivas
- Creation date: 22 June 1793
- Created by: Charles IV
- Peerage: Peerage of Spain
- First holder: Juan Martín Pérez de Saavedra y Ramírez, 1st Duke of Rivas
- Present holder: José Sainz y Armada, 7th Duke of Rivas
- Heir apparent: José Sainz y Primo de Rivera

Duke of Rivas (Spanish: Duque de Rivas) is a hereditary title in the Peerage of Spain, accompanied by the dignity of Grandee and granted in 1793 by Charles IV to Juan Martín Pérez de Saavedra y Ramírez, with the denomination of "Duke of Rivas de Saavedra", later abbreviated to "Duke of Rivas" by Isabella II.

== Background ==
The grantee was Juan Martín Pérez de Saavedra y Ramírez, 6th Marquess of Rivas and 4th Marquess of Villar, Gentilhombre Grande de España con ejercicio y servidumbre of king Charles IV, as well as caballerizo mayor of the then Prince of Asturias. Pérez de Saavedra was decorated with the Grand Cross of the Order of Charles III.

The Dukedom of Rivas was created by elevating the Marquessate of Rivas de Saavedra into a dukedom. The original marquessate had been granted by Philip IV in favor of the field marshal José Ramírez de Saavedra y Ulloa, with the initial denomination of "Marquess of Rivas" by royal decree of May 4, 1637, and royal dispatch of July 25, 1641. The holders of the primitive grant appear indistinctly as Marquesses of "Rivas" or "Ribas", in accordance with the orthographic indeterminacy that was usual before the 19th century, and with or without the surname of "Saavedra" added to the original name.

The grantee of the marquessate was Lord of Rivas de Jarama, knight of the Order of Santiago and warden of the fortress of Bodonales in Alcántara, 7th field marshal of the Army of Flanders, where he obtained resounding victories, captain general of the Artillery of Aragon and Head of the House of Rivas. The Household of Rivas and estates had been founded in 1500 by Francisco Ramírez de Madrid, nicknamed "el artillero" (the gunner), first Lord of Bornos, captain general of the Artillery of Castile, secretary of Ferdinand the Catholic, warden of the Reales Alcázares de Sevilla and minister of the Royal Royal Council of State and War.

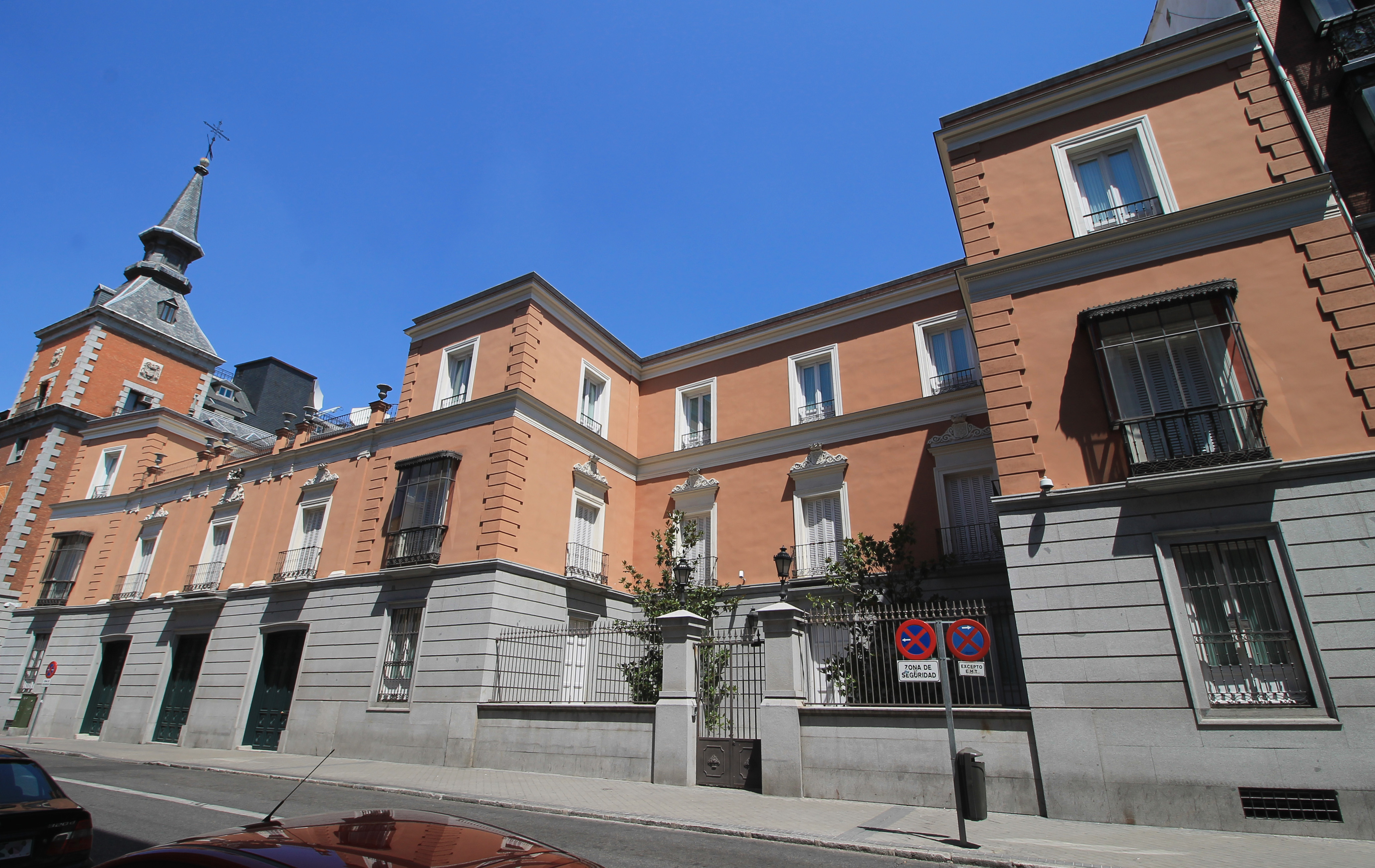
Palace of Viana in Madrid, residence of the Dukes of Rivas and later of the 2nd Marquess of Viana, who inherited it from his grandfather the Duke of Rivas

Charles IV had granted "honours and treatment of Grandee of Spain" to the 4th Marquess of Rivas, by royal decree of 12 November 1789 and royal dispatch of 21 November 1792, a year before elevating the title to a dukedom.

Isabella II promoted the title to the 1st class Grandeeship by royal decree most likely in 1844 and royal dispatch of 6 September 1850, to further honour the 3rd Duke: Ángel de Saavedra, a prominent poet and playwright who became Prime Minister of Spain. The 3rd Duke of Rivas was also the Director of the Royal Spanish Academy, a knight of the Order of the Golden Fleece, Santiago and Malta and knight grand cross of the Order of Charles III. He was still recorded at the time as "Duke of Rivas de Saavedra".

The title takes its name from the town of Rivas de Jarama, which had been the domain of the 1st Marquess since 1628. This ancient municipality, located to the southeast of the court of Madrid is today integrated into that of Rivas-Vaciamadrid.

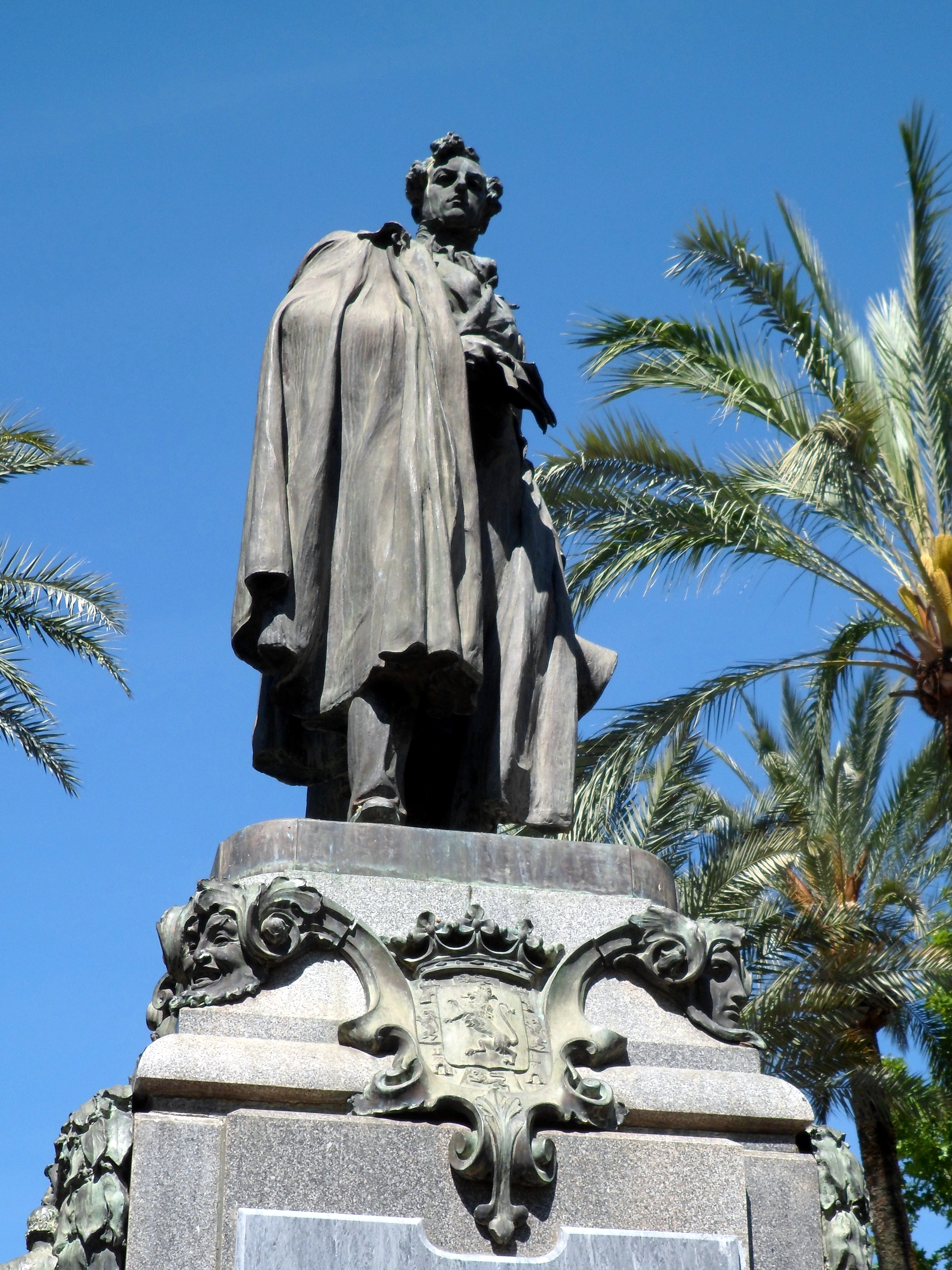
Monument to the 3rd Duke of Rivas in Córdoba, sculpted by Mariano Benlliure in 1929

== Marquesses of Rivas (1641) ==
- José Ramírez de Saavedra y Ulloa, 1st Marquess of Rivas
- Francisco Ramírez de Saavedra y Agramont, 2nd Marquess of Rivas
- Lorenzo Ramírez de Saavedra y Sarmiento, 3rd Marquess of Rivas
- Mariana Ramírez de Saavedra, 4th Marquess of Rivas
- Antonia Pérez de Saavedra y Ramírez, 5th Marquess of Rivas
- Juan Martín Pérez de Saavedra y Ramírez, 6th Marquess of Rivas

== Dukes of Rivas (1793) ==
- Juan Martín Pérez de Saavedra y Ramírez, 1st Duke of Rivas
- Juan Remigio Pérez de Saavedra y Remírez de Baquedano, 2nd Duke of Rivas
- Ángel Pérez de Saavedra y Remírez de Baquedano, 3rd Duke of Rivas
- Enrique Ramírez de Saavedra y Cueto, 4th Duke of rivas
- María del Consuelo Ramírez de Saavedra y Anduaga, 5th Duchess of Rivas
- José Victoriano Sainz y Ramírez de Saavedra, 6th Duke of Rivas
- José Sainz y Armada, 7th Duke of Rivas

== See also ==
- List of dukes in the peerage of Spain
- List of current grandees of Spain
