= Duke of Luna =

Dukedom of Spain

Ducal arms of Luna

The Duke of Luna is a Spanish ducal title first created in 1495 by King Alfonso II of Aragon and revived in 1895 by King Alfonso XIII.

== List of holders ==
	Title	Period
Created by Ferdinand II of Aragon
I	Juan José de Aragón y Sotomayor	1495-1528
Revived by Alfonso XIII of Spain
II	José Antonio Azlor de Aragón y Hurtado de Zaldívar	1895-1935
III	María del Pilar Azlor de Aragón y Guillamas	1935-1970
IV	Javier de Urzáiz y Azlor de Aragón	1970–2013
V	Javier Azlor de Aragón y Ramírez de Haro	2015–present

=== Succession ===
As with other Spanish noble titles, the dukedom of Luna descended according to cognatic primogeniture, meaning that females could inherit the title if they had no brothers (or if their brothers had no issue). That changed in 2006, since when the eldest child (regardless of gender) automatically succeeds to noble family titles.

== See also ==
- Alfonso de Aragón y de Escobar, Duke of Villahermosa
- Grandees of Spain
