= Duke of Victoria de las Amezcoas =

Hereditary title in the Peerage of Spain, accompanied by the dignity of Grandee

Dukedom of Victoria de las Amezcoas
- Creation date: 24 May 1836
- Created by: Charles V
- Peerage: Peerage of Spain
- First holder: Tomás de Zumalacárregui e Imaz, 1st Duke of Victoria de las Amezcoas
- Present holder: Francisco Javier de Oraá y Moyua, 4th Duke of Victoria de las Amezcoas

Duke of Victoria de las Amezcoas (Spanish: Duque de la Victoria de las Amezcoas) is a hereditary title in the Peerage of Spain, accompanied by the dignity of Grandee and granted posthumously in 1836 by Carlist pretender to the throne Infante Carlos as Charles V to Tomás de Zumalacárregui, captain general of the Carlist army, along with the Countship of Zumalacárregui.

The title makes reference to the military victories of Zumalacárregui, particularly in the Amezcoas region of Navarre. Although it was originally granted as "Duke of la Victoria" (duque de la Victoria), Francisco Franco added the suffix "de las Amezcoas" in 1955 to distinguish it from the existing Dukedom of la Victoria, which had been granted in 1839 by Isabella II to Zumalacárregui's enemy, Baldomero Espartero.

== Dukes of la Victoria de las Amezcoas ==
=== 1836 ===
- Tomás de Zumalacárregui e Imaz, 1st Duke of Victoria de las Amezcoas

=== 1955 ===
- José Manuel de Oraá y Mendía, 2nd Duke of Victoria de las Amezcoas
- José Manuel de Oraá y Sanz, 3rd Duke of Victoria de las Amezcoas
- Francisco Javier de Oraá y Moyua, 4th Duke of Victoria de las Amezcoas

== See also ==
- List of dukes in the peerage of Spain
- List of current grandees of Spain
