= Duke of San Miguel =

Dukedom of Spain

Dukedom of San Miguel
- Creation date: 5 July 1625
- Created by: Philip IV of Spain
- Peerage: Peerage of Spain
- First holder: Juan Gravina y Cruyllas, 1st Duke of San Miguel
- Present holder: Juan Bautista Castillejo y Oriol, 4th Duke of San Miguel

Duke of San Miguel (Spanish: Duque de San Miguel) is a hereditary title in the peerage of Spain, accompanied by the dignity of Grandee and granted in 1625 by Philip IV to Juan Gravina y Cruyllas, viceroy of Sicily.

The title became vacant for more than 200 years until Francisco Franco rehabilitated it in 1956 on behalf of Juan Castillejo y Ussía, 6th Count of Floridablanca and a descendant of the 2nd duke.

Federico Gravina, the Spanish admiral during the Battle of Trafalgar, was a son of the 1st Duke of San Miguel.

== Disambiguation ==
In 1855 Isabella II granted a dukedom with the same name to Evaristo Fernández de San Miguel, Captain general of the Army, with no relation to the present dukedom. Because the original Dukedom of San Miguel had been granted in the Kingdom of Sicily, it was not registered under Spain's peerage.

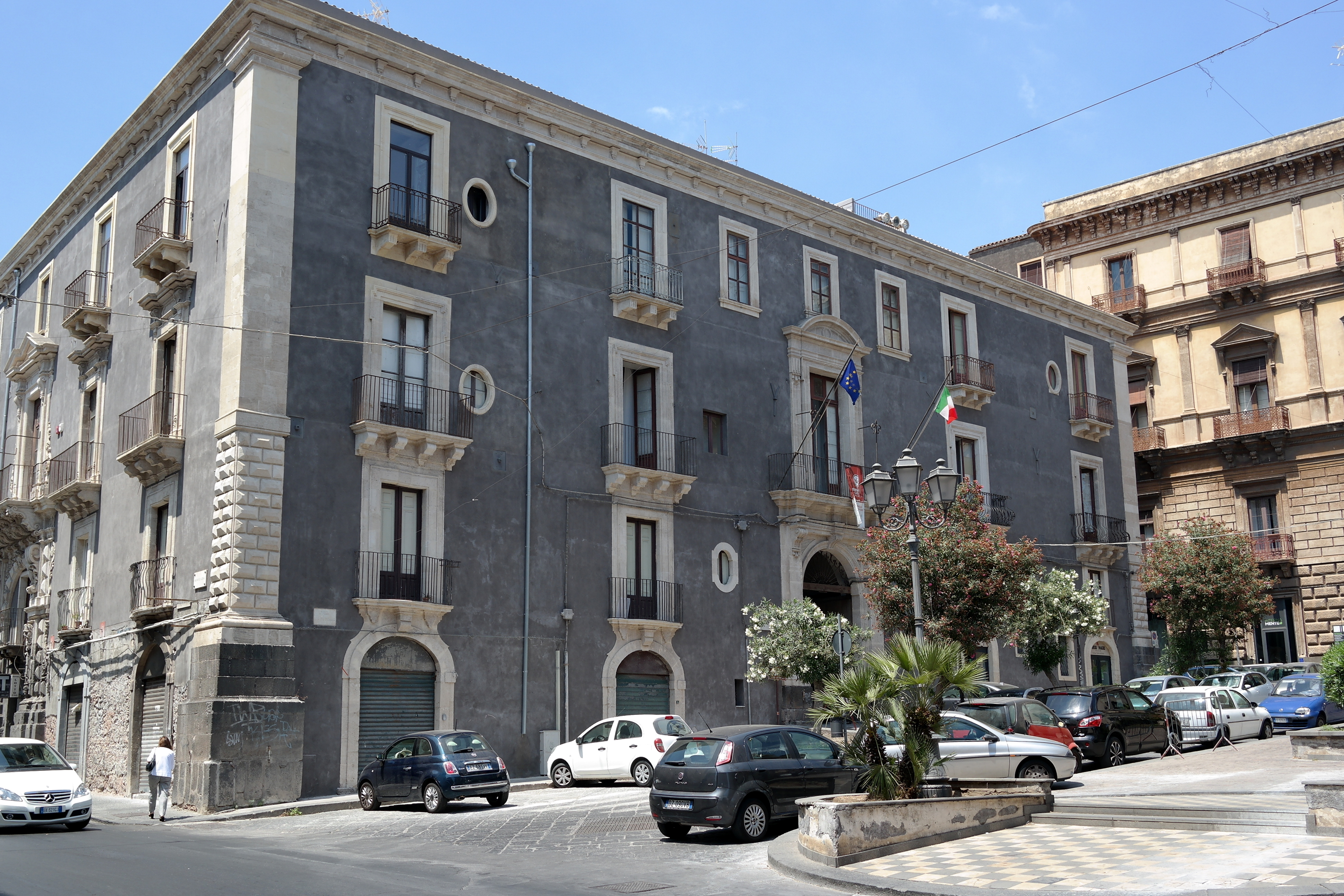
Palace of the Dukes of San Miguel, in Catania, Sicily

== Dukes of San Miguel ==
=== 1625 ===
- Juan Gravina y Cruilles, 1st Duke of San Miguel
- Juan Gravina y Requesens, 2nd Duke of San Miguel

=== 1956 ===
- Juan Castillejo y Ussía, 3rd Duke of San Miguel
- Juan Bautista Castillejo y Oriol, 4th Duke of San Miguel

== See also ==
- List of dukes in the peerage of Spain
- List of current grandees of Spain

== Bibliography ==
- Alonso de Cadenas, Amperio (1991). Suplemento al Elenco de Grandezas y Títulos Nobiliarios Españoles, Apéndice II: Títulos Vacantes y Títulos Extranjeros cuyo uso fue autorizado en España. Ediciones Hidalguía. ISBN 978-84-87204-29-6.
- Hidalgos de España, Real Asociación de (2018). Elenco de Grandezas y Títulos Nobiliarios Españoles. Ediciones Hidalguía. ISBN 978-84-94841-02-6.
