= House of Osorio =

Coat of arms of the House of Osorio

The House of Osorio is an old and influential Spanish noble family, which originated in the Kingdom of Castile and León.

== History ==
They descend from count Osorio Martínez, a prominent nobleman in the first half of the 12th century who was member of the Flagínez family and husband to a granddaughter of king Alfonso VI of León. It was from his grandson, Osorio González, that the family derived its patronymic surname. His son Rodrigo Osorio is relatively obscure, but had two sons who accompanying king Ferdinand III of Castile on his conquest of Seville, receiving lands there, and who used Osorio as a surname: Rodrigo Rodríguez Osorio and Álvar Rodríguez Osorio.

The son of Rodrigo Rodríguez, also named Álvar Rodríguez Osorio, rose to prominence in the service of king Sancho IV of Castile. He had three sons :

- Juan Álvarez Osorio, a court official and ancestor of the later noble family,
- Gonzalo Osorio, Bishop of Mondoñedo (d. 1326),
- Álvar Núñez Osorio, Count of Trastámara, Lemos and Sarria, and Mayordomo mayor before being executed by king Alfonso XI in 1329.

Later descendants would be Grandees of Spain and would hold numerous titles, including Marquess of Astorga and Duke of Alburquerque. The Osorio shield is gold with two wolves.

== Sources ==
- J. M. Canal Sánchez-Pagín. "El Conde Osorio Martinez y los Marqueses de Astorga". Astorica 7:11–31 (1988).
- J. de Salazar y Acha. "Los Osorio: Un linaje de más de mil años al servicio de la Corona". Anales de la Real Academia Matritense de Heráldica y Genealogía, 4:143–82 (1996–97).
