= Duke of Fernández-Miranda =

Dukedom of Spain

- Creation date: 31 May 1977
- Created by: Juan Carlos I
- Peerage: Spanish nobility
- First holder: Torcuato Fernández-Miranda, 1st Duke of Fernández-Miranda
- Present holder: Enrique Fernández-Miranda y Lozana, 2nd Duke of Fernández-Miranda

Duke of Fernández-Miranda (Spanish: Duque de Fernández-Miranda) is a hereditary title of Spanish nobility, accompanied by the dignity of Grandee. It was created on 31 May 1977 by King Juan Carlos I in favor of politician Torcuato Fernández-Miranda, who played an important role in the Spanish transition to democracy. His political education of then Prince Juan Carlos (starting in 1960) during the dictatorship of Francisco Franco, and his statesmanship creating transitional laws and a Constitution, and in facilitating the referendum and democratic elections after the death of Francisco Franco in 1975, were instrumental in Spain's return to democracy.

== History ==
Torcuato Fernández-Miranda y Hevia (1915–1980), 1st Duke of Fernández-Miranda, was the former president of the Cortes Españolas and of the Council of the Realm. Contrary to Franco's intent or the dictatorship to continue after his own death, Torcuato Fernández-Miranda served as a statesman in the Spanish transition to democracy, instrumental in helping King Juan Carlos I, and the people of Spain, to replace the bodies Torcuato Fernández-Miranda had been president of with a democratic Cortes Generales. He also served as first deputy prime minister, and as acting prime minister after the assassination of Luis Carrero Blanco.

- Married María del Carmen Lozana and Abeo.

Enrique Fernández-Miranda y Lozana (1949–), 2nd Duke of Fernández-Miranda.

- Married María de los Reyes de Marcos y Sánchez

== Dukes of Fernández-Miranda ==
	Title Holder	Period
Created by Juan Carlos I
i	Torcuato Fernández-Miranda y Hevia	1977–1980
ii	Enrique Fernández-Miranda y Lozana	1982–pres.

Coronet of a Spanish grandee

Coronet of a Spanish duke

== See also ==
- List of dukes in the peerage of Spain
- List of current grandees of Spain
