= Duke of Granada de Ega =

Dukedom of Spain

Dukedom of Granada de Ega
- Creation date: 29 March 1729
- Created by: Philip V
- Peerage: Peerage of Spain
- First holder: Juan de Idiázquez y Eguía, 1st Duke of Granada de Ega
- Present holder: Juan Alfonso Martos y Azlor de Aragón, 9th Duke of Granada de Ega

Duke of Granada de Ega (Spanish: Duque de Granada de Ega) commonly known as Duke of Granada, is a hereditary title in the peerage of Spain accompanied by the dignity of Grandee and granted in 1729 by Philip V to Juan de Idiázquez y Eguía, who was captain general of the Royal Spanish Armies.

The title makes reference to an area near the River Ega, in Navarre.

== Dukes of Granada de Ega (1729) ==
- Juan de Idiázquez y Eguía, 1st Duke of Granada de Ega (1665–1736)
- Antonio de Idiáquez y Garnica, 2nd Duke of Granada de Ega (1686–1754), eldest son of Pedro de Idiázquez y Eguía, brother of the 1st Duke
- Ignacio de Idiáquez y Aznárez Garro, 3rd Duke of Granada de Ega (1713–1769), eldest son of the 2nd Duke
- Francisco de Borja de Idiáquez y Palafox, 4th Duke of Granada de Ega (d. 1817), eldest son of the 3rd Duke
- Francisco Javier de Idiáquez y Carvajal, 5th Duke of Granada de Ega (1778–1848), eldest son of the 4th Duke
- Francisco Javier Azlor de Aragón e Idiáquez, 6th Duke of Granada de Ega (1842–1919), eldest son of María de la Concepción de Idiázquez y del Corral, eldest daughter of the 5th Duke
- José Antonio Azlor de Aragón y Hurtado de Zaldívar, 7th Duke of Granada de Ega (1873–1960), eldest son of the 6th Duke
- María del Carmen Azlor de Aragón y Guillamas, 8th Duchess of Granada de Ega (1912–1988), eldest daughter of the 7th Duke
- Juan Alfonso Martos y Azlor de Aragón, 9th Duke of Granada de Ega (b. 1942), eldest son of the 8th Duchess

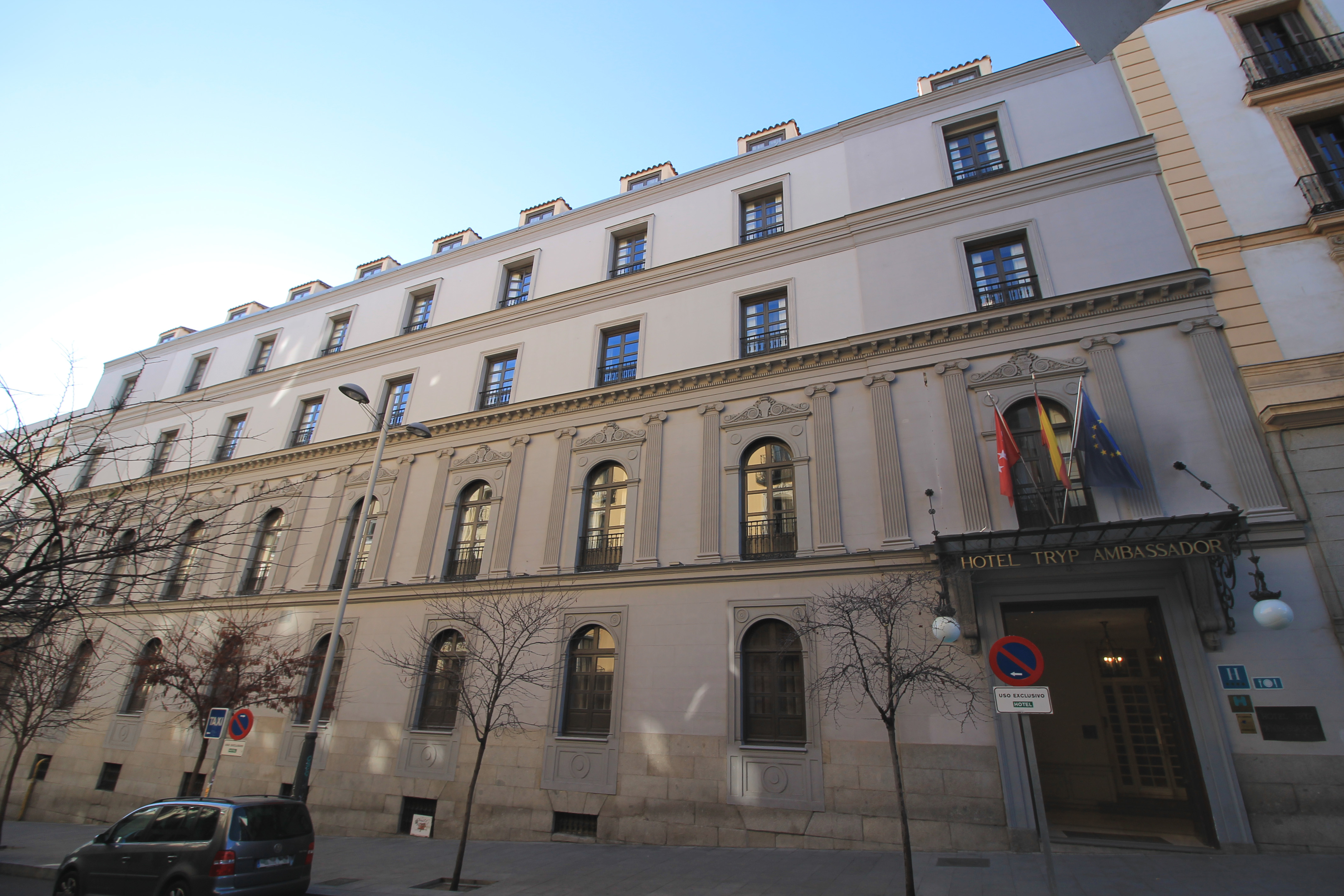
Palace of the Dukes of Granada in Madrid, now houses a hotel

== See also ==
- List of dukes in the peerage of Spain
- List of current grandees of Spain

== Bibliography ==
- Hidalgos de España, Real Asociación de (2018). Elenco de Grandezas y Títulos Nobiliarios Españoles. Ediciones Hidalguía. ISBN 978-84-94841-02-6.
