= Duke of Santa Elena =

- Creation date: 9 July 1917
- Created by: Alfonso XIII
- Peerage: Spanish nobility
- First holder: Alberto Enrique María de Borbón y Castellví, Marquess of Santa Elena
- Present holder: Alfonso de Borbón y Sanchiz
- Remainder to: heirs of the body of the grantee according to absolute primogeniture
- Status: Extant

Duke of Santa Elena (Spanish: Duque de Santa Elena) is a hereditary title of Spanish nobility, accompanied by the dignity of Grandee. It was created on 9 July 1917 by King Alfonso XIII in favor of Army lieutenant colonel Alberto Enrique de Borbón y Castellví, Marquess of Santa Elena and Knight of the Order of the Golden Fleece.

== Creation ==
Alberto Enrique de Borbón, a member of the royal family, was the son of Infante Enrique, Duke of Seville. After his father's death, he was adopted by his uncle, Francisco de Asís, The King Consort. Years later, his cousing, King Alfonso XII, created him Maquess of Santa Elena and, in 1917, King Alfonso XIII elevated the title to the rank of dukedom, granting him also the dignity of Grandee.

On 10 July 1917, the Gazeta de Madrid published the following decree:

Wishing to offer proof of my Royal esteem to Don Alberto de Borbón y de Castellví, Marquess of Santa Elena; bearing in mind the provisions of the Royal Decree of 27 May 1912; in accordance with the opinions of the Deputation of the Grandees of Spain and the Permanent Commission of the Council of State; at the proposal of My Minister of Grace and Justice, and after hearing my Council of Ministers,
I hereby elevate the title of Marquess of Santa Elena to the rank of Duke, with the dignity of Grandee and the same title of Santa Elena, which is hereby extinguished; it being understood that the aforementioned concession is made in favor of the aforementioned Don Alberto de Borbón y de Castellví, for himself, his children, and his legitimate successors.

— ALFONSO, Royal Decree of 9 July 1917.

== Marquesses of Santa Elena (1878) ==
- Alberto Enrique María de Borbón y Castellví (1854–1939), Marquess of Santa Elena (1878–1917)

== Dukes of Santa Elena (1917) ==
1. Alberto Enrique María de Borbón y Castellví (1854–1939), 1st Duke of Santa Elena (1917–1939)
2. Alberto María de Borbón y d'Ast (1883–1959), 2nd Duke of Santa Elena (1940–1959)
3. Alberto Enrique de Borbón y Pérez del Pulgar (1933–1995), 3rd Duke of Santa Elena (1960–1995)
4. Alfonso de Borbón y Sanchiz (born 1961), 4th Duke of Santa Elena (since 1995)

== Line of succession ==
- Alberto Enrique María de Borbón y Castellví, 1st Duke of Santa Elena, 1st Marquess of Santa Elena (1854–1917)
  - Alberto María de Borbón y d'Ast, 2nd Duke of Santa Elena (1883–1959)
    - Alfonso María de Borbón y Pintó (1909–1938)
      - Alberto Enrique de Borbón y Pérez del Pulgar, 3rd Duke of Santa Elena, 14th Marquess of Santa Fe de Guardiola (1933–1995)
        - Alfonso de Borbón y Sanchiz, 4th Duke of Santa Elena, 15th Marquess of Santa Fe de Guardiola (b. 1961)
          - (1) Maria de Borbón y Escrivá de Romaní, 4th Marchioness of Albaicín (b. 1994)
          - (2) Eugenia de Borbón y Escrivá de Romaní (b. 1994)
          - (3) Alfonso de Borbón y Escrivá de Romaní (b. 1995)
        - (4) Maria Luisa de Borbón y Sánchiz (b. 1962)
      - Alfonso María de Borbón y Pintó (1937–2007)
        - Alfonso de Borbón y Medina (1963–2005)
          - (5) Alfonso de Borbón y Pérez (b. 1999)
        - Fernando de Borbón y Medina (1966–2025)
          - (6) Fernando de Borbón y Vallejo (b. 2001)
          - (7) Sofía de Borbón y Vallejo (b. 2002)
          - (8) Ignacio de Borbón y Vallejo (b. 2005)
        - (9) Jaime de Borbón y Medina (b. 1971)
    - María Luisa de Borbón y Pintó (1918–2018)
      - (10) Nicolas Gereda y de Borbón (b. 1942)
        - (11) Ana Cristina Gereda y Cuadra (b. 1973)
        - (12) Mónica Luisa Gereda y Cuadra (b. 1974)
        - (13) Nicolás Alfonso Gereda y Cuadra (b. 1975)
        - (14) María de las Mercedes Gereda y Cuadra (b. 1979)
        - (15) Leticia Gereda y Cuadra (b. 1983)
      - (16) Alfonso Gereda y de Borbón (b. 1943)
