= List of dukes in the peerage of Spain =

Heraldic representation of the coronet of a Spanish duke

This is a list of the 149 present and extant royal and non-royal dukes in the peerage of the Kingdom of Spain.

The oldest six titles – created between 1380 and 1476 – were Duke of Medina Sidonia (1380), Duke of Alburquerque (1464), Duke of Segorbe (1469), Duke of Alba (1472), Duke of Escalona (1472), and Duke of Infantado (1475).

Spanish dukes have precedence over other ranks of Spanish nobility, nowadays all holding the court rank of Grande de España, i.e. Grandee of the Realm. The only exception to this is the Dukedom of Fernandina, which due to a series of complex rehabilitation processes was never recognised with such title.

== Dukes in the peerage of Spain ==
Title	Year of creation	Arms	Current holder	Houses
Duke of Abrantes	1642		José Manuel de Zuleta y Alejandro	Láncastre, Carvajal, Zuleta
Duke of Ahumada	1836		Francisco Chico de Guzmán y Girón	Girón, Guzmán
Duke of Alba de Tormes	1472		Carlos Fitz-James Stuart y Martínez de Irujo	Toledo, Silva, FitzJames-Stuart
Duke of Alburquerque	1464		Juan Miguel Osorio y Bertrán de Lis	la Cueva, Osorio
Duke of Alcalá de los Gazules	1558		Victoria Elisabeth de Hohenlohe-Langenburg y Schmidt-Polex	Ribera, Enríquez, la Cerda, Córdoba
Duke of la Alcudia	1792		Carlos Ruspoli y Álvarez de las Asturias Bohorques	Godoy, Ruspoli
Duke of Algeciras	1906		Carlos López de Carrizosa y Mitjans	Castro, Hoyos, Carrizosa
Duke of Algete	1728		Juan Miguel Osorio y Bertrán de Lis	Moscoso, Zayas, Osorio, Villavicencio, Osorio
Duke of Aliaga	1487		Luis Martínez de Irujo y Hohenlohe-Langenburg	Híjar, Silva, FitzJames-Stuart, Martínez de Irujo
Duke of Almazán	1698		Natalia Ruth Mariátegui y Muro	Abarca, Silva, Mariátegui, FitzJames-Stuart
Duke of Almazán de Saint Priest	1830		Béatrice Marguerite Marie-Thérèse de Castellane	Castellane
Duke of Almenara Alta	1830		María Soledad Martorell y Castillejo	Fivaller, Martorell
Duke of Almodóvar del Río	1780		Alfonso de Hoyos y Fernández de Córdoba	Luján, Centelles, Fernández de Córdoba, Hoces, Sánchez, Hoyos
Duke of Almodóvar del Valle	1871		Alfonso Martel y Fonseca	Martel, Rosales
Duke of Amalfi	1642		Íñigo de Seoane y García	Fuster, Zayas, Cotoner, Seoane
Duke of Andría	1904		Teresa Roca de Togores y Bustos	Bustos, Togores
Duke of Ansola	1887		María Cecilia Walford Hawkins y de Borbón	Borbón, Walford
Duke of Arco	1715		Mercedes Falcó y de Anchorena	Manrique de Lara, Lasso de la Vega, Solís, Osorio, Falcó
Duke of Arcos	1493		María Cristina de Ulloa y Solís-Beaumont	Ponce de León, Pimentel, Téllez-Girón, Brunetti, Solís-Beaumont
Duke of Arévalo del Rey	1903		Juan Pablo de Lojendio y Pardo-Manuel de Villena	Pardo-Manuel de Villena, Lojendio
Duke of Arión	1725		Joaquín Fernández de Córdoba y Hohenlohe-Langenburg	Zúñiga, Pimentel, Velasco, Pacheco, Córdoba
Duke of Arjona	1902		Cayetano Martínez de Irujo y FitzJames-Stuart	FitzJames-Stuart, Martínez de Irujo
Duke of Atrisco	1708		Adelaida Barón y Carral	Sarmiento de Valladares, Guzmán, Osorio de Moscoso, Bauffremont, Barón
Duke of Aveyro	1681		Rafael Oliveira Rodrigues	Castro y Bourbon
Duke of Baena	1566		María Cristina Ruiz de Arana y Marone-Cinzano	Fernández de Córdoba, Arana
Duke of Bailén	1833		Francisco Javier Cavero de Carondelet y Christou	Castaños, Carondelet, Fernández de Córdoba, Cavero
Duke of Béjar	1485		Pedro de Alcántara Roca de Togores y Salinas	Zúñiga, Pimentel, Téllez-Girón, Roca de Togores
Duke of Benavente	1473		Ángela María de Solís-Beaumont y Téllez-Girón	Pimentel, Téllez-Girón
Duke of Berwick	1707		Carlos Fitz-James Stuart y Martínez de Irujo	Fitz-James Stuart
Duke of Bivona	1865		Manuel Falcó y Anchorena	Álvarez de Toledo, Falcó
Duke of Bournonville	1717		Álvaro de Silva y Mora	Bournonville, Silva
Duke of Calvo Sotelo	1948-2022		José Calvo Sotelo	
Duke of Camiña	1619		Victoria Elisabeth de Hohenlohe-Langenburg y Schmidt-Polex	Meneses, Portocarrero, Moncada, Córdoba
Duke of Canalejas	1913		José Manuel Canalejas y Huertas	Fernández
Duke of Cánovas del Castillo	1901		Fernando Fernández de Córdova y Hohenlohe	Cánovas del Castillo, Arión
Duke of Cardona	1482		Casilda Ghisla Guerrero-Burgos y Fernández de Córdoba	Cardona, Aragón, la Cerda, Córdoba
Duke of Carrero Blanco	1973-2022		Luis Carrero Blanco	
Duke of Castillejos	1871		Blanca Muntadas-Prim y Desvalls	Prim
Duke of Castro-Enríquez	1858		Íñigo de Arróspide y Valera	Álvarez
Duke of Castro-Terreño	1825		Ana Sánchez-Navarro y Quintana	Nadal
Duke of Ciudad Real	1613		Alexander Gonzalo von Hohenlohe-Langenburg	Idiáquez, Pimentel, Orozco, Osorio, Salabert, Córdoba
Duke of Ciudad Rodrigo	1812		Charles Wellesley	Wellesley
Duke of la Conquista	1847		Alfonso Miguel de Egaña y Huerta	Castro, Villaroel, Quindós, Arenillas
Duke of Dato	1921		María del Pilar Espinosa de los Monteros y Sainz-Tovar	Dato, Espinosa de los Monteros
Duke of Denia	1882		Victoria Elisabeth de Hohenlohe-Langenburg y Schmidt-Polex	Córdoba
Duke of Dúrcal	1885		María Cristina Patiño y Borbón	Borbón
Duke of Elío	1875		Inés de Elío y Gaztelu	Elío
Duke of Escalona	1472		Francisco de Borja de Soto y Moreno-Santamaría	Pacheco, Velasco, Girón, Martorell, Soto
Duke of Estremera	1568		María de la Asunción de Bustos y Marín	Silva
Duke of Feria	1567		Rafael de Medina y Abascal	Figueroa, Córdoba, Feria
Duke of Fernán Núñez	1817		Manuel Falcó y Anchorena	Gutiérrez de los Ríos, Solís, Falcó
Duke of Fernández-Miranda	1977		Enrique Fernández-Miranda y Lozana	Fernández-Miranda
Duke of Fernandina	1559		Alonso Enrique González De Gregorio y Viñamata	Álvarez de Toledo
Duke of Francavilla	1555		Jaime de Arteaga y Martín	Mendoza, Silva, Toledo, Arteaga
Duke of Franco	1975-2022		Francisco Franco	
Duke of Frías	1492		Francisco de Borja de Soto y Moreno-Santamaría	Velasco, Soto
Duke of Galisteo	1871		Juan José Mesía y Medina	Fitz-James Stuart, Mesía del Barco
Duke of Gandía	1485		Ángela María de Ulloa y Solís-Beaumont	Borja, Alfonso-Pimentel, Téllez-Girón, Solís-Beaumont
Duke of Gor	1803		Mauricio Álvarez de las Asturias Bohorques y Silva	Álvarez de las Asturias Bohorques
Duke of Granada de Ega	1729		Juan Alfonso Martos y Azlor de Aragón	Idiáquez, Aragón-Azlor, Martos
Duke of Grimaldi	1777		José Joaquín Márquez y Pries	Grimaldi, Patiño, Márquez
Duke of Hernani	1914		Margarita de Borbón y Borbón	Borbón
Duke of Híjar	1483		Alfonso Martínez de Irujo y Fitz-James Stuart	
Duke of Hornachuelos	1868		José Ramón de Hoces y Elduayen	
Duke of Huéscar	1563		Fernando Juan Fitz-James Stuart y de Solís	
Duke of Huete	1474		Alfonso de Bustos y Donate	
Duke of Infantado	1475		Almudena Arteaga y del Álcazar	Mendoza
Duke of las Torres	1907		Mónica de Figueroa y Cernuda	
Duke of Lécera	1493		Leticia de Silva y Allende	
Duke of Lerma	1599		Fernando Larios y Fernández de Córdoba	
Duke of Linares	1667		Álvaro Zuleta de Reales y Ansaldo	
Duke of Liria and Jérica	1707		Carlos Fitz-James Stuart y Martínez de Irujo	
Duke of Lugo	1995		Elena de Borbón y Grecia	Borbón
Duke of Luna	1495		Javier Azlor de Aragón y Ramírez de Haro	
Duke of Mandas y Villanueva	1614		Ricardo Ignacio Rafael de la Huerta y Ozores	
Duke of Maqueda	1529		María del Pilar Paloma de Casanova-Cárdenas y Barón	
Duke of Marchena	1885		Juan Jacobo Walford-Hawkins y Borbón	Borbón
Duke of Maura	1930		Ramiro Pérez-Maura y de la Peña	
Duke of Medina de las Torres	1625		José María Ruiz de Bucesta y Osorio de Moscoso	
Duke of Medina de Rioseco	1538		María Asunción Latorre y Téllez-Girón	Enríquez
Duke of Medina Sidonia	1380		Leoncio Alonso González de Gregorio y Álvarez de Toledo	Guzmán, Toledo
Duke of Medinaceli	1479		Victoria Elisabeth de Hohenlohe-Langenburg y Schmidt-Polex	la Cerda
Duke of Miranda	1664		Javier de Silva y Mendaro	
Duke of Moctezuma de Tultengo	1627		Juan José Marcilla de Teruel-Moctezuma y Valcárcel	
Duke of Mola	1947-2022		Emilio Mola	
Duke of Montalto	1507		Ricardo de Bustos y Martorell	
Duke of Montealegre	1633		Isidro Castillejo y Bermúdez de Castro	
Duke of Monteleón	1527		José María Pignatelli de Aragón y Burgos	Pignatelli
Duke of Montellano	1705		Carla Pía Falcó y Medina	
Duke of Montemar	1735		Tatiana Osorio de Moscoso y Sánchiz	
Duke of Montoro	1660		Eugenia Martínez de Irujo y FitzJames-Stuart	
Duke of Nájera	1482		Juan Travesedo y Colón de Carvajal	
Duke of Nemi	1828		Giovanni Angelo Theodoli-Braschi	
Duke of Noblejas	1829		Antonio de Egaña y Barrenechea	
Duke of Nochera	1656		Filippo Balbo Bertone di Sambuy	
Duke of Olivares	1625		Carlos Fitz-James Stuart y Martínez de Irujo	
Duke of Osuna	1562		Ángela María de Solís-Beaumont y Téllez-Girón	
Duchess of Palma de Mallorca	1997-2015		Infanta Cristina of Spain	Borbón
Duke of Palata	1646		Alfonso de Urzáiz y Azlor de Aragón	
Duke of Parcent	1914		Juan Granzow de la Cerda y Roca de Togores	
Duke of Parque	1780		María Rosa Osorio y Malcampo	
Duke of Pastrana	1572		José María de la Blanca Finat y Bustos	Silva
Duke of Peñaranda de Duero	1608		Jacobo Hernando Fitz-James Stuart y Gómez	Zúñiga
Duke of Pinohermoso	1907		Alfonso María de Barrera y Pérez de Seoane	
Duke of Primo de Rivera	1948-2022		Primo de Riveira	
Duke of Plasencia	1476		María de Gracia de Solís-Beaumont y Téllez-Girón	Zúñiga
Duke of Prim	1871		María de los Ángeles Muntadas-Prim y Lafita	
Duke of Regla	1859		Justo Fernández del Valle y Cervantes	
Duke of Riánsares	1844		María de la Consolación Muñoz y Santa Marina	
Duke of Rivas	1641		José Sainz y Armada	
Duke of la Roca	1793		Jacobo Hernando Fitz-James Stuart y Gómez	
Duke of Rubí	1920		Valeriano Weyler y González	
Duke of San Carlos	1780		Álvaro Fernández de Villaverde y Silva	
Duke of San Fernando de Quiroga	1815		Rafael Ignacio Melgarejo y de la Peña	
Duke of San Fernando Luis	1816		Antoine de Lévis-Mirepoix	
Duke of San Lorenzo de Valhermoso	1794		María Cristina Osorio y Malcampo	
Duke of San Miguel	1625		Juan Bautista Castillejo y Oriol	
Duke of San Pedro de Galatino	1621		Teresa de Medinilla y Bernales	Spinola
Duke of Sanlúcar la Mayor	1625		María Cristina Ruiz de Arana y Marone-Cinzano	
Duke of Santa Cristina	1830		Miguel Márquez y Osorio	Ruffo di Calabria
Duke of Santa Elena	1917		Alfonso Gonzalo de Borbón y Sánchiz	Borbón
Duke of Santángelo	1497		Luis María Gonzaga de Casanova-Cárdenas y Barón	
Duke of Santisteban del Puerto	1738		Victoria Medina y Conradi	
Duke of Santo Buono	1958		Juan Pedro del Alcázar y Gómez-Acebo	
Duke of Santo Mauro	1890		Álvaro Fernández-Villaverde y Silva	
Duke of Santoña	1875		Juan Manuel Mitjans y Domecq	
Duke of Segorbe	1469		Ignacio Medina y Fernández de Córdoba	
Duke of Seo de Urgel	1891		Arsenio Vilallonga y Martínez de Campos	
Duke of Sessa	1507		Gonzalo Barón y Gavito	
Duke of Seville	1823		Francisco de Paula de Borbón y Escasany	Borbón
Duke of Solferino	1717		Carlos Luis Llanza y Domecq	Gonzaga
Duke of Soma	1502		José María Ruiz de Bucesta y Osorio de Moscoso	
Duke of Soria	1981		Margarita de Borbón y Borbón	Borbón
Duke of Sotomayor	1703		Carlos Martínez de Irujo y Crespo	
Duke of Suárez	1981		Alejandra Romero y Suárez	
Duke of Sueca	1804		Luis Carlos Ruspoli y Sánchiz	Godoy, Ruspoli
Duke of T'Serclaes	1856		José María Pérez de Guzmán y Martínez de Campos	
Duke of Talavera de la Reina	1914		Álvaro de Silva y Mazorra	Silva
Duke of Tamames	1805		Juan José Mesía y Medina	
Duke of Tarancón	1847		Juan Parra y Villate	
Duke of Tarifa	1886		Victoria Elisabeth de Hohenlohe-Langenburg y Schmidt-Polex	
Duke of Terranova	1502		Gonzalo de la Cierva y Moreno	
Duke of Tetuán	1860		Hugo O'Donnell y Duque de Estrada	O'Donnell
Duke of la Torre	1862		Carlos Martínez de Campos y Carulla	
Duke of Tovar	1906		Alfonso Figueroa y Melgar	
Duke of Uceda	1610		Pilar Latorre y Téllez-Girón	
Duke of la Unión de Cuba	1847		Rocío Bernaldo de Quirós y Coca	
Duke of Valencia	1847		Abigaíl Narváez y Rodríguez-Arias	
Duke of la Vega	1557		Ángel Colón de Carvajal y Mandalúniz	
Duke of Veragua	1537		Cristóbal Colón de Carvajal y Gorosábel	
Duke of la Victoria	1839		Pablo Montesino-Espartero y Velasco	
Duke of Victoria de las Amezcoas	1836		Francisco Javier de Oraá y Moyúa	
Duke of Villahermosa	1476		Álvaro de Urzáiz y Azlor de Aragón	
Duke of Vista Alegre	1876		Fernando María Sánchez de Toca y Martín	
Duke of Vistahermosa	1879		Cristóbal García-Loygorri y Urzáiz	
Duke of Zaragoza	1834		Manuel Álvarez de Toledo y Mencos	

== See also ==
- Spanish nobility
- Grandee of Spain
- List of viscounts in the peerage of Spain
- List of barons in the peerage of Spain
- List of lords in the peerage of Spain

== Bibliography ==
- Hidalgos de España, Real Asociación de (2018). Elenco de Grandezas y Títulos Nobiliarios Españoles. Ediciones Hidalguía. ISBN 978-84-94841-02-6.
