= Duke of Santoña =

Dukedom of Spain

Dukedom of Santoña
- Creation date: 10 May 1875
- Created by: Alfonso XII
- Peerage: Peerage of Spain
- First holder: Juan Manuel de Manzanedo y González de la Teja, 1st Duke of Santoña
- Present holder: Juan Manuel Mitjans y Domecq, 5th Duke of Santoña
- Former seat: Palace of Santoña

Duke of Santoña (Spanish: Duque de Santoña) is a hereditary title in the Peerage of Spain accompanied by the dignity of Grandee, granted in 1875 by Alfonso XII to Juan Manuel de Manzanedo, an important railway and banking tycoon who contributed greatly to the Bourbon Restoration in Spain.

The title makes reference to the port city of Santoña in Cantabria.

== Dukes of Santoña (1875) ==
- Juan Manuel de Manzanedo y González de la Teja, 1st Duke of Santoña (1803-1882)
- Juan Manuel Mitjans y Manzanedo, 2nd Duke of Santoña (1865-1929), eldest son of Josefa de Manzanedo e Intentas, eldest daughter of the 1st Duke
- Juan Manuel Mitjans y Murrieta, 3rd Duke of Santoña (1891-1965), eldest son of the 2nd Duke
- Juan Manuel Mitjans y López de Carrizosa, 4th Duke of Santoña (1917-1967), eldest son of the 3rd Duke
- Juan Manuel Mitjans y Domecq, 5th Duke of Santoña (b. 1951), eldest son of the 4th Duke

== See also ==
- List of dukes in the peerage of Spain
- List of current grandees of Spain

== Bibliography ==
- Hidalgos de España, Real Asociación de (2018). Elenco de Grandezas y Títulos Nobiliarios Españoles. Ediciones Hidalguía. ISBN 978-84-94841-02-6.
