= Marquessate of Barboles =

Spanish nobility title

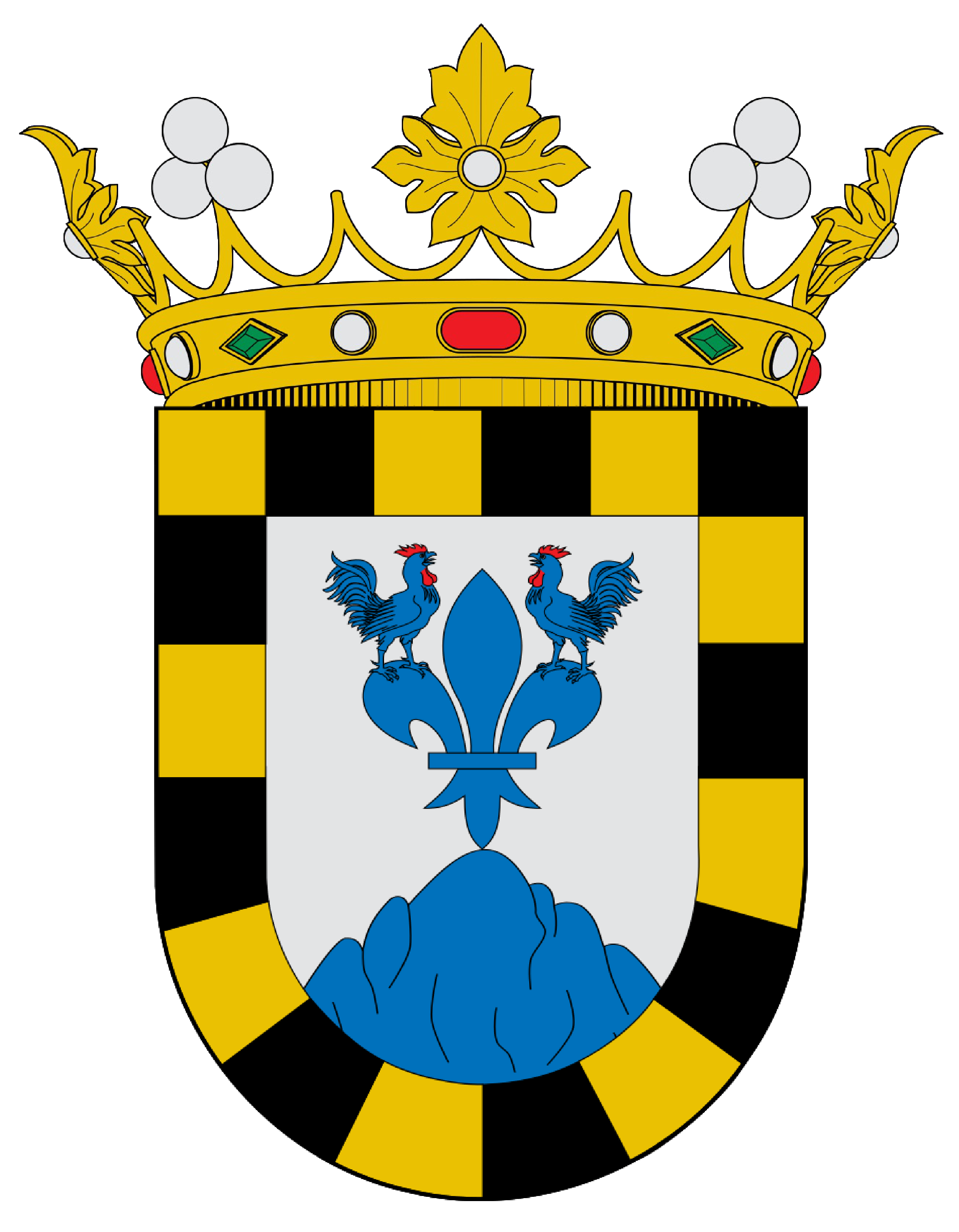
- Creation date: 20 May 1647
- Created by: Philip IV of Spain
- Peerage: Spain
- First holder: Juan Ximénez-Cerdán Fernández de Heredia y Embun
- Present holder: Pilar Benitez Guadarrama, 14th Marchioness of Bárboles
- Remainder to: Absolute primogeniture

The Marquessate of Barboles is a Spanish nobility title created by King Philip IV, on 20 March 1647, in favor of Juan Ximénez-Cerdán and Fernández de Heredia, that belonged to the house of Juan Ximénez de Cerdán (1355–1435). It is associated with the Zaragoza town of Bárboles. The XIV Marchioness María del Pilar Benítez y Guadarrama succeeded to the marquisate in 1986 with grandeship of Spain after 1987.
