= Duke of San Pedro de Galatino =

Dukedom of San Pedro de Galatino
- Creation date: 6 April 1621
- Created by: Philip IV
- Peerage: Peerage of Spain
- First holder: Juan Bautista Spínola y Lecari, 1st Duke of San Pedro de Galatino
- Present holder: Teresa de Medinilla y Bernales, 11th Duchess of San Pedro de Galatino

Duke of San Pedro de Galatino (Spanish: Duque de San Pedro de Galatino) is a hereditary title in the Peerage of Spain accompanied by the dignity of Grandee, granted in 1621 by Philip IV to Juan Bautista Spínola, a Genoese nobleman.

The name makes reference to the town of Galatina in Apulia, Italy, known before the Unification of italy as "San Pietro in Galatina".

== Dukes of San Pedro de Galatino ==
=== 1621 ===
- Juan Bautista Spínola y Lecari, 1st Duke of San Pedro de Galatino
- Juan Felipe Spínola y Spínola, 2nd Duke of San Pedro de Galatino
- Francisco María Spínola y Spínola, 3rd Duke of San Pedro de Galatino
- Juan Felipe Spínola y Spínola, 4th Duke of San Pedro de Galatino
- Francisco María Spínola y Contreras, 5th Duke of San Pedro de Galatino
- Isabel María Spínola y Spínola, 6th Duchess of San Pedro de Galatino
- Carlos Gallarati Scotti y Belloni, 7th Duke of San Pedro de Galatino

=== 1905 ===
- Julio Quesada-Cañaveral y Piédrola, 8th Duke of San Pedro de Galatino
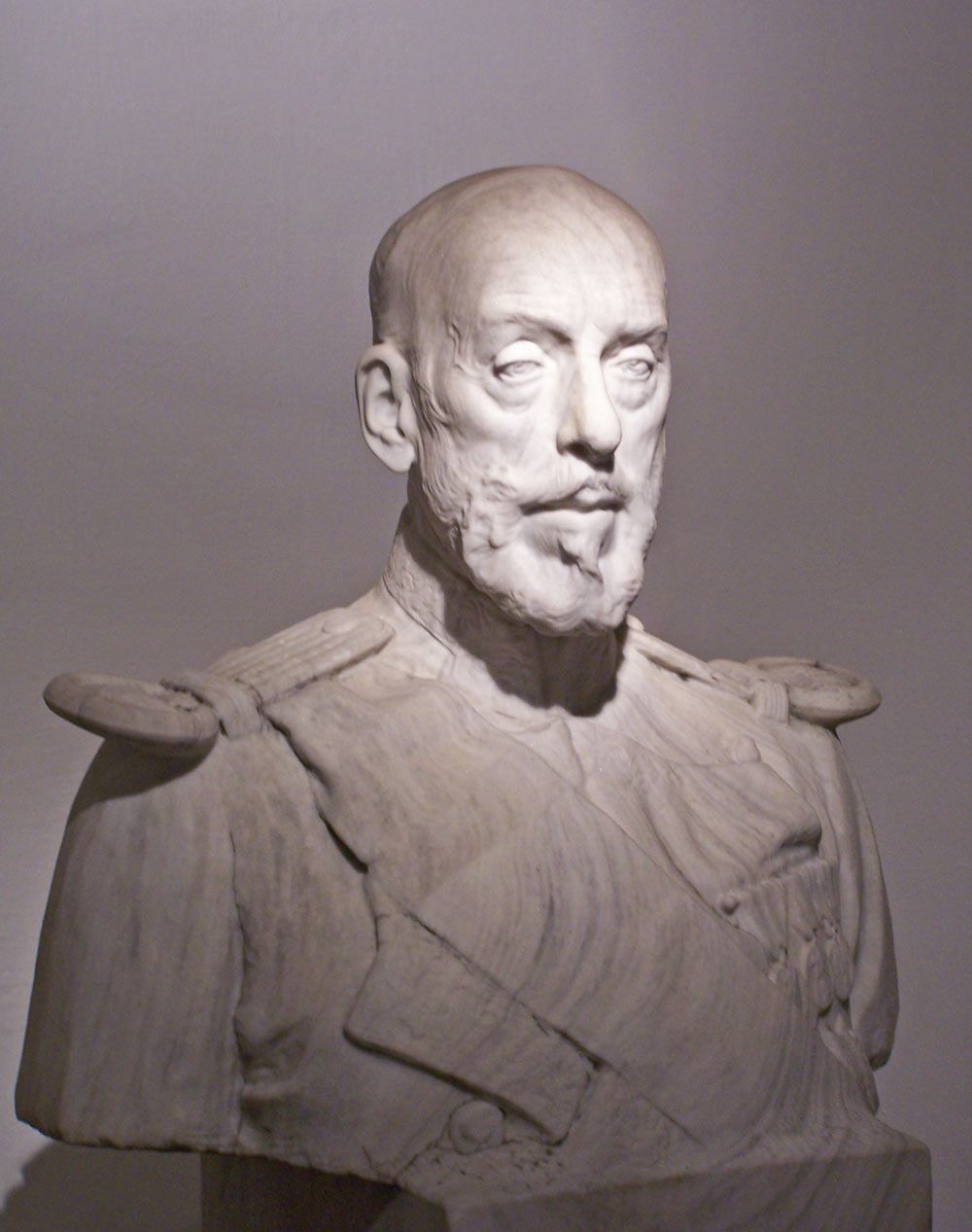
  Marble bust of the 8th Duke by Benlliure, 1931
- Rodrigo de Medinilla y Quesada-Cañaveral, 9th Duke of San Pedro de Galatino
- Gonzalo de Medinilla y Quesada-Cañaveral, 10th Duke of San Pedro de Galatino
- Teresa de Medinilla y Bernales, 11th Duchess of San Pedro de Galatino

== Contested claimants ==
In the 19th century, the 7th duke's descendants ceased to pay their title inheritance taxes in Spain, and as a consequence the title became vacant, but was still recognised in the Kingdom of Italy. In 1905, the Spanish king Alfonso XIII rehabilitated the dukedom on behalf of Julio Quesada-Cañaveral, a descendant of the 3rd duke. The title was still claimed by the Italian descendants of the 7th duke, and so there continues to be an unrecognised pretender to the title in the Republic of Italy, where peerage titles are not officially recognized since 1948.

== See also ==
- List of dukes in the peerage of Spain
- List of current grandees of Spain

== Bibliography ==
- Hidalgos de España, Real Asociación de (2018). Elenco de Grandezas y Títulos Nobiliarios Españoles. Ediciones Hidalguía. ISBN 978-84-94841-02-6.
