= Lord of Casa Rubianes =

Hereditary title

Lordship of Casa Rubianes
- Creation date: 4 February 1537
- Created by: Charles I
- Peerage: Spanish nobility
- First holder: Rodrigo Antonio de Mendoza y Caamaño, 1st Lord of Casa Rubianes
- Present holder: Beatriz Ozores y Rey, 19th Lady of Casa Rubianes
- Status: Extant

Lord of Casa Rubianes (Spanish: Señor de la Casa de Rubianes) is a hereditary title of Spanish nobility, accompanied by the dignity of Grandee. It was created, as a jurisdictional manor, on 4 February 1537 by King Charles I (V) in favor of García de Caamaño de Mendoza, Lord of Villagarcía, Rubianes, Vista Alegre, Arealonga and Barrantes. On 8 March 1761, King Charles III granted the dignity of Grandee to the holder of the title.

== Lords of Casa Rubianes (1537) ==
- García de Caamaño de Mendoza, 1st Lord of Casa Rubianes (1535–1540)
- García Rodríguez de Caamaño, 2nd Lord of Casa Rubianes (1540–1575)
- García de Caamaño y Mendoza, 3rd Lord of Casa Rubianes (1575–1583)
- José de Caamaño y Mendoza, 4th Lord of Casa Rubianes (1583–1630)
- Antonia de Caamaño y Mendoza, 5th Lady of Casa Rubianes (1630–1698)
- Antonio Domingo de Mendoza Caamaño y Sotomayor, 6th Lord of Casa Rubianes (1698–1714)
- José Antonio de Mendoza, 7th Lord of Casa Rubianes (1714–1746)
- Rodrigo Antonio de Mendoza y Caamaño, GE, 8th Lord of Casa Rubianes (1746–1781)
- Joaquín Ginés de Oca y Moctezuma, GE, 9th Lord of Casa Rubianes (1781–1795)
- Clara de Oca y Moctezuma, GE, 10th Lady of Casa Rubianes (1795–1799)
- Juan Gayoso de Mendoza y Caamaño, GE, 11th Lord of Casa Rubianes (1818–1826)
- Miguel Gayoso de Mendoza y Caamaño, GE, 12th Lord of Casa Rubianes (1826–1837)
- José Ramón Ozores y Calo, GE, 13th Lord of Casa Rubianes (1848–1849)
- Juan Ozores y Valderrama, GE, 14th Lord of Casa Rubianes (1851–1870)
- Jacobo Ozores y Mosquera, GE, 15th Lord of Casa Rubianes (1872–1901)
- Gonzalo Ozores y Saavedra, GE, 16th Lord of Casa Rubianes (1902–1958)
- Alfonso Ozores y Saavedra, GE, 17th Lord of Casa Rubianes (1960–1962)
- Gonzalo Ozores y Úrcola, GE, 18th Lord of Casa Rubianes (1964–2006)
- Beatriz Ozores y Rey, GE, 19th Lady of Casa Rubianes (since 2009)

== See also ==
- List of lords in the peerage of Spain
- List of current grandees of Spain

== Bibliography ==
- (de) Salazar y Acha, Jaime (2012). Los Grandes de España (siglos XV-XXI) [The Grandees of Spain (15th-21st century)] (in Spanish). Ediciones Hidalguía. pp. 305–306. ISBN 978-84 939313-9-1.
