= Duke of Grimaldi =

Dukedom of Spain

- Creation date: 8 February 1777
- Created by: Charles III
- Peerage: Peerage of Spain
- First holder: Pablo Jerónimo de Grimaldi y Pallavicini, 1st Duke of Grimaldi
- Present holder: José Joaquín Márquez y Pries, 6th Duke of Grimaldi

Duke of Grimaldi (Spanish: Duque de Grimaldi) is a hereditary title of Spanish nobility, accompanied by the dignity of Grandee. It was created in 1777 by Charles III to Pablo Jerónimo de Grimaldi, a member of the House of Grimaldi and marquess of Grimaldi in Geneva, that served as prime minister of Spain from 1763 to 1777.

When the second duke died, the title became vacant for almost a century, until Alfonso XIII reinstated it on behalf of María del Rosario Patiño y Losada, the most senior direct descendant of the last titleholder, thus becoming the 3rd Duchess of Grimaldi in 1927.

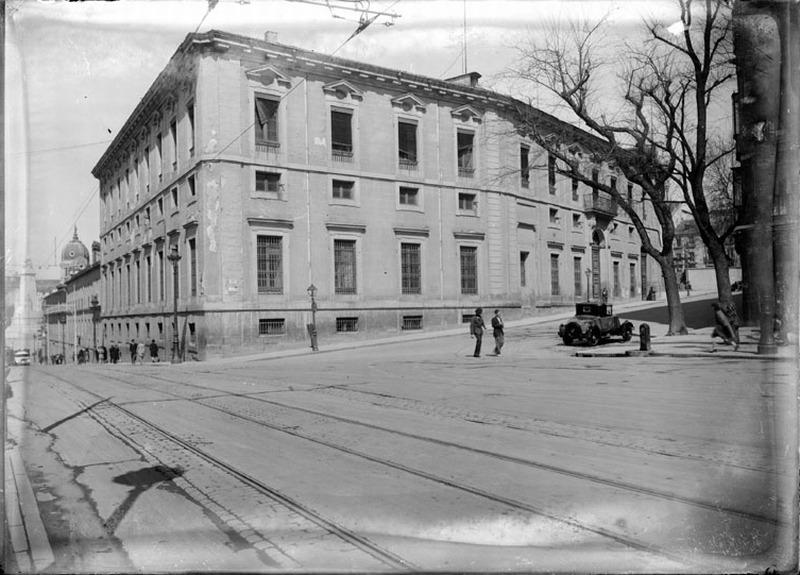
Palace of the Duke of Grimaldi in Madrid, 1930

== Dukes of Grimaldi ==
=== 1777 ===
- Pablo Jerónimo de Grimaldi y Pallavicini, 1st Duke of Grimaldi (1710-1789)
- Francisco María Grimaldi y Spínola, 2nd Duke of Grimaldi (1789-19th century), nephew of the 1st Duke

=== 1927 ===
- María del Rosario Patiño y Losada, 3rd Duchess of Grimaldi (1902-1942), direct descendant of the 2nd Duke
- José Joaquín Márquez y Patiño, 4th Duke of Grimaldi (1923-1973), son of the 3rd Duchess
- José Joaquín Márquez y Ulloa, 5th Duke of Grimaldi (1949-1999), son of the 4th Duke
- José Joaquín Márquez y Pries, 6th Duke of Grimaldi (b. 1978), son of the 5th Duke

== See also ==
- List of dukes in the peerage of Spain
- List of current grandees of Spain
