= Duke of Bailén =

Dukedom of Spain

Dukedom of Bailén
- Creation date: 12 June 1833
- Created by: Ferdinand VII
- Peerage: Peerage of Spain
- First holder: Francisco Javier Castaños y Aragorri, 1st Duke of Bailén
- Present holder: Francisco Javier Cavero de Carondelet y Christou, 7th Duke of Bailén

Duke of Bailén (Spanish: Duque de Bailén) is a hereditary title in the peerage of Spain accompanied by the dignity of Grandee and granted in 1833 by Ferdinand VII to Francisco Javier Castaños for his military achievements during the Peninsular War as Captain general of the Royal Spanish Armies, becoming the first man to defeat a Napoleonic army in an open field battle.

It is a victory title, and was bestowed on General Castaños following his successful command at the Battle of Bailén in July 1808.

== Dukes of Bailén (1833) ==
- Francisco Javier Castaños y Aragorri, 1st Duke of Bailén (1756–1852)
- Luis Carondelet y Castaños, 2nd Duke of Bailén (1787–1869)
- Eduardo Carondelet y Dorado, 3rd Duke of Bailén (1820–1882)
- María de la Encarnación Fernández de Córdoba y Carondelet, 4th Duchess of Bailén (1862–1923)
- José María Cavero y Goicoerrotea, 5th Duke of Bailén (1895–1970)
- Juan Manuel Cavero de Carondelet y Bally, 6th Duke of Bailén (1927–2013)
- Francisco Javier Cavero de Carondelet y Christou, 7th Duke of Bailén (born 1952)

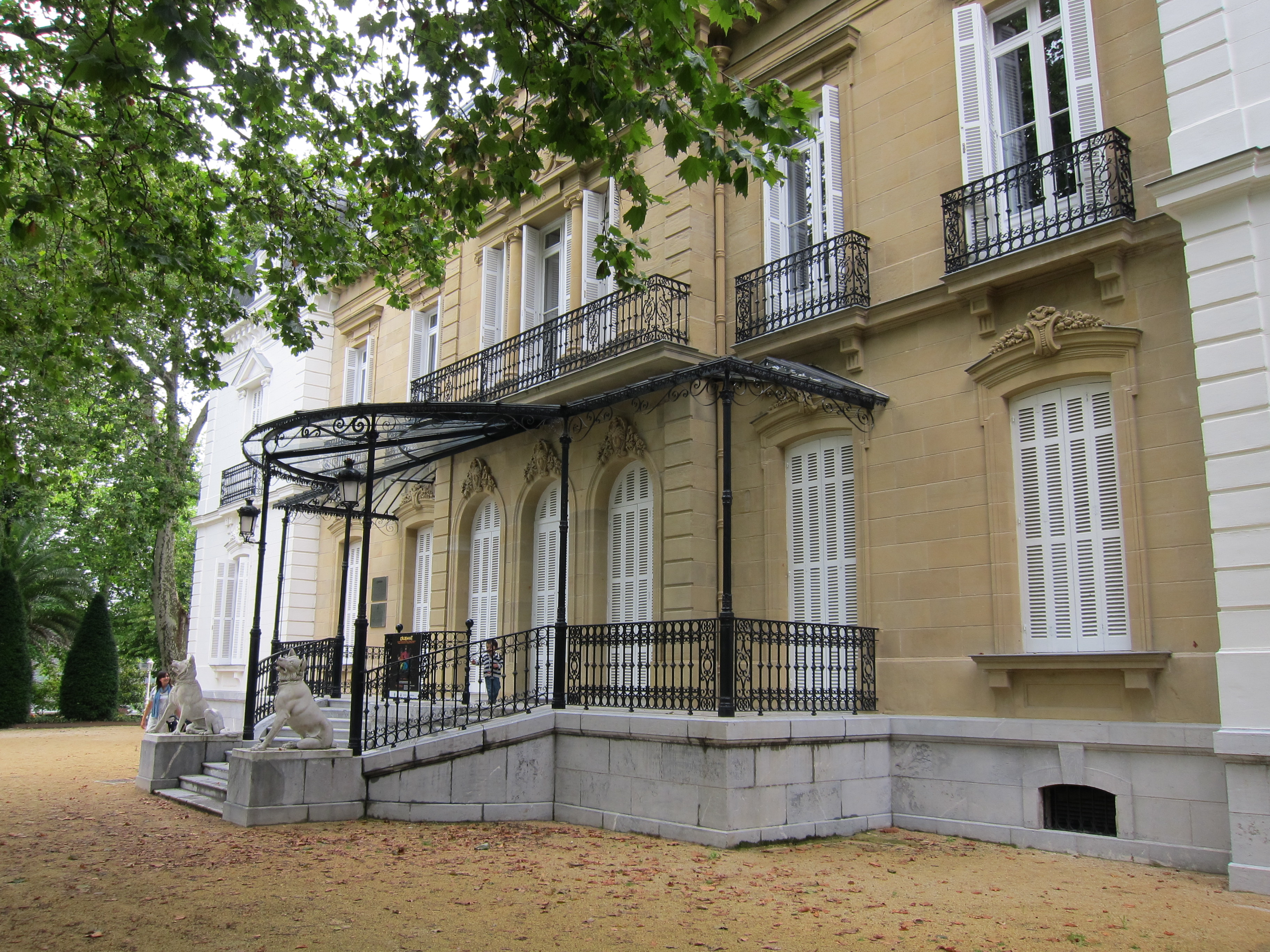
Palace of the Dukes of Bailén in San Sebastián

== Line of succession ==
- Juan Felipe Castaños y Urioste (1715–1778)
  - Francisco Javier Castaños y Aragorri, 1st Duke of Bailén (1756–1852)
  - María de la Concepción Castaños y Aragorri (1759–1831)
    - Luis Ángel de Carondelet y Castaños, 2nd Duke of Bailén, 6th Baron of Carondelet (1787–1869)
      - Eduardo Carondelet y Donado, 3rd Duke of Bailén, 1st Marquess of Portugalete, 7th Baron of Carondelet (1820–1882)
      - Matilda de Carandolet y Donado (1828–1864)
        - María de la Encarnación Fernández de Córdoba y Carondelet, 4th Duchess of Bailén, 12th Marchioness of Mirabel, 9th Countess of Berantevilla (1862–1923)
      - María Sofía Carondelet y Donado (1834–1873)
        - María de la Ascensión y de los Dolores Goicoerrotea y Carondelet, 2nd Marchioness of Portugalete (1870–1920)
          - José María Cavero y Goicoerrotea, 5th Duke of Bailén, 3rd Marquess of Portugalete (1895–1970)
            - Juan Manuel Cavero de Carondelet y Bally, 6th Duke of Bailén, 6th Marquess of Portugalete (1927–2013)
              - Francisco Javier Cavero de Carondelet y Christou, 7th Duke of Bailén, 7th Marquess of Portugalete (born 1952)
                - (1) Beltrán Cavero de Carondelet y Aguirre (b. 1979)
                  - (2) José Cavero de Carondelet y de Rojas (b. 2019)
                - (3) Borja Cavero de Carondelet y Aguirre (b. 1988)

== See also ==
- List of dukes in the peerage of Spain
- List of current grandees of Spain

== Bibliography ==
- Hidalgos de España, Real Asociación de (2018). Elenco de Grandezas y Títulos Nobiliarios Españoles. Ediciones Hidalguía. ISBN 978-84-94841-02-6.
