= Duke of Francavilla =

Hereditary title in the Peerage of Spain

Dukedom of Francavilla
- Creation date: 1 March 1555
- Created by: Charles I
- Peerage: Peerage of Spain
- First holder: Diego Hurtado de Mendoza y de la Cerda, 1st Duke of Francavilla
- Present holder: Jaime de Arteaga y Martín, 15th Duke of Francavilla

Duke of Francavilla (Spanish: Duque de Francavilla) is a hereditary title in the Peerage of Spain, accompanied by the dignity of Grandee and granted in 1555 by Charles I to Diego Hurtado de Mendoza, Viceroy of Aragon and Catalonia and son of Cardinal Mendoza.

The title makes reference to the town of Francavilla Fontana in the former Kingdom of Naples, at the time a part of the Spanish Empire.

== Dukes of Francavilla (1555) ==
- Diego Hurtado de Mendoza y de la Cerda, 1st Duke of Francavilla
- Ana Hurtado de Mendoza y de Silva, 2nd Duchess of Francavilla
- Diego Gómez de Silva y Hurtado de Mendoza, 3rd Duke of Francavilla
- Rui Gómez de Silva y Mendoza, 4th Duke of Francavilla
- Rodrigo Díaz de Vivar y De Silva, 5th Duke of Francavilla
- Gregorio María de Silva y Mendoza, 6th Duke of Francavilla
- Juan de Dios de Silva y Haro, 7th Duke of Francavilla
- María Teresa de Silva y Gutiérrez de los Ríos, 8th Duchess of Francavilla
- Pedro de Alcántara Álvarez de Toledo y Silva, 9th Duke of Francavilla
- Pedro de Alcántara Álvarez de Toledo y Salm-Salm, 10th Duke of Francavilla
- Pedro de Alcántara Téllez-Girón y Beaufort Spontin, 11th Duke of Francavilla
- Mariano Téllez-Girón y Beaufort Spontin, 12th Duke of Francavilla
- Manuel Álvarez de Toledo y Lasparre, 13th Duke of Francavilla
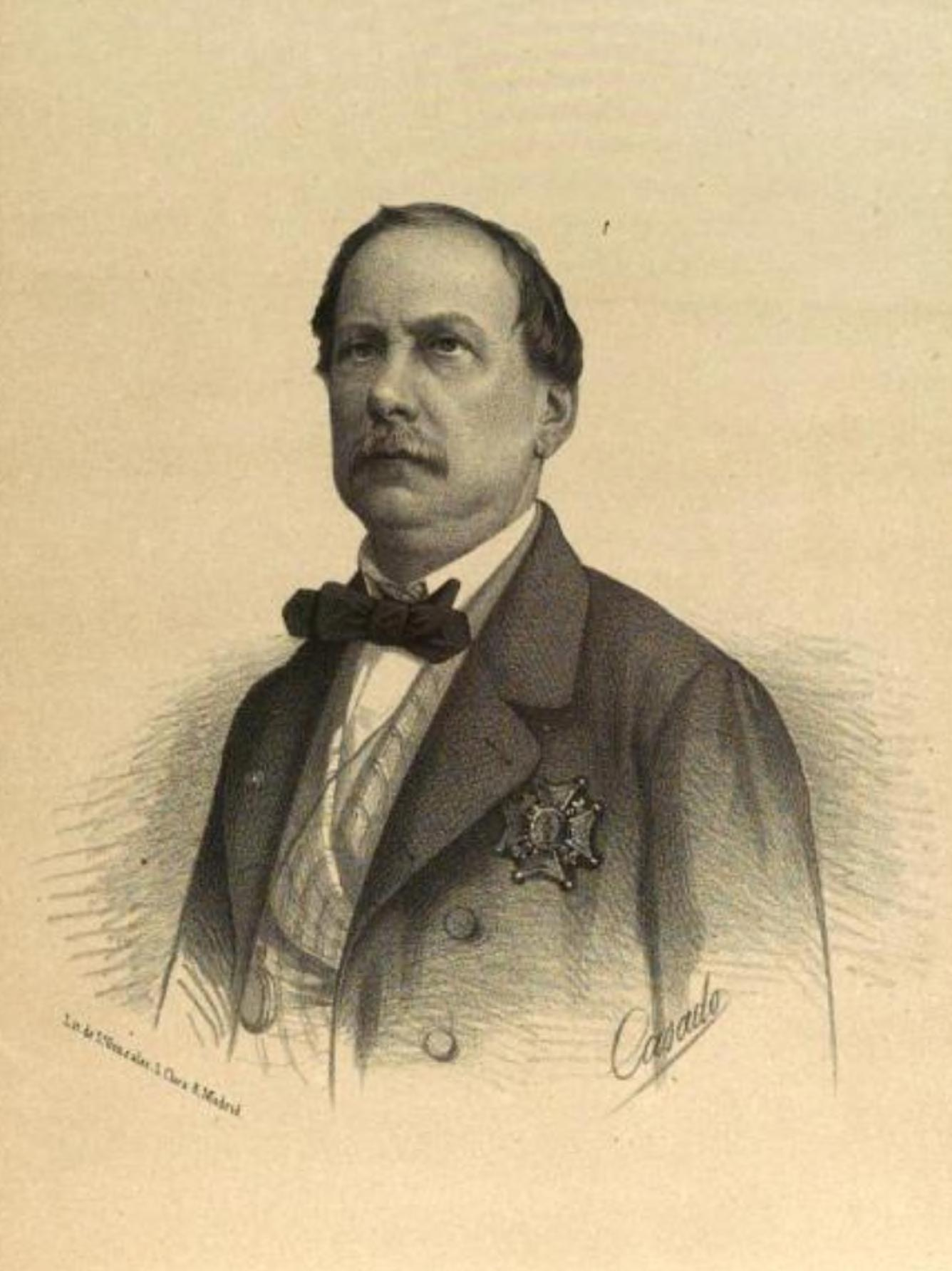
  Lithography of the 13th Duke of Francavilla, c. 1853
- Iñigo de Arteaga y Falguera, 14th Duke of Francavilla
- Jaime de Arteaga y Martín, 15th Duke of Francavilla

== See also ==
- List of dukes in the peerage of Spain
- List of current grandees of Spain
