= Duke of la Victoria (title) =

Hereditary title in the Peerage of Spain, accompanied by the dignity of Grandee

Dukedom of la Victoria
- Creation date: 14 December 1839
- Created by: Isabella II
- Peerage: Peerage of Spain
- First holder: Joaquín Baldomero Fernández-Espartero y Álvarez de Toro, 1st Duke of la Victoria
- Present holder: Pablo Montesino-Espartero y Velasco, 6th Duke of la Victoria

Duke of la Victoria (Spanish: Duque de la Victoria) is a hereditary title in the Peerage of Spain, accompanied by the dignity of Grandee and granted in 1839 by Isabella II to Baldomero Espartero, who was Prime Minister of Spain, in remembrance of his military victories that led to the embrace of Vergara. He was also made Prince of Vergara by Amadeo I to recognise this peace treaty.

The current duke is the Spanish General Consul in São Paulo.

== Dukes of la Victoria (1839) ==
- Joaquín Baldomero Fernández-Espartero y Álvarez de Toro, 1st Duke of la Victoria
- Eladia Fernández-Espartero y Blanco, 2nd Duchess of la Victoria
- Pablo Montesino y Fernández-Espartero, 3rd Duke of la Victoria
- José Luis Montesino-Espartero y Averly, 4th Duke of la Victoria
- Pablo Montesino-Espartero y Juliá, 5th Duke of la Victoria
- Pablo Montesino-Espartero y Velasco, 6th Duke of la Victoria

== See also ==
- List of dukes in the peerage of Spain
- List of current grandees of Spain
