= Duke of Tamames =

Dukedom of Spain

Dukedom of Tamames
- Creation date: 23 May 1805
- Created by: Charles IV
- Peerage: Peerage of Spain
- First holder: Antonio María Mesía del Barco y Castro, 1st Duke of Tamames
- Present holder: Vacant
- Heir apparent: Juan José Mesía y Medina, 6th Duke of Galisteo

Duke of Tamames (Spanish: Duque de Tamames) is a hereditary title in the Peerage of Spain, accompanied by the dignity of Grandee and granted in 1805 by Charles IV to Antonio María Mesía del Barco, 22nd Lord of Tamames and 7th Marquess of Campollano.

== Dukes of Tamames (1805) ==
- Antonio María Mesía del Barco y Castro, 1st Duke of Tamames
- José María Mesía del Barco y Garro, 2nd Duke of Tamames
- José Mesía del Barco y Pando, 3rd Duke of Tamames
- José Mesía del Barco y Gayoso de los Cobos, 4th Duke of Tamames
- José María Mesía del Barco y Fitz-James Stuart, 5th Duke of Tamames
- Juan María Mesía del Barco y Lesseps, 6th Duke of Tamames
- José Luis Mesía y Figueroa, 7th Duke of Tamames

== See also ==
- List of dukes in the peerage of Spain
- List of current grandees of Spain
