= Caballerizo mayor =

Officer of the Royal Household and Heritage of the Crown of Spain

Court dress of the Caballerizo mayor in 1900

The Caballerizo mayor (Great Equerry) was an officer of the Royal Household and Heritage of the Crown of Spain. The position was responsible for overseeing royal journeys, the mews, and the king's hunts.

== Regime during the 16th to 18th centuries ==
The office of Caballerizo mayor was one of the principal positions within the Royal Household, responsible for the royal stables and all matters related to the monarch's transportation. When the king departed from the royal palace, the Caballerizo mayor occupied the foremost position behind him and held higher rank than other court officials. The role also included oversight of the stables, carriages, and horses, with assistance from the Primeros Caballerizos (First Equerries), who were appointed by the Caballerizo mayor.

In addition, the Caballerizo mayor was in charge of the royal hunt in his capacity as Montero mayor (Great Hunter). In many cases, he also held the alcaldías (majorships) of the Spanish royal sites.

== Regime during the 19th and 20th centuries ==
During the reigns of Alfonso XII and Alfonso XIII, the Caballerizo mayor, who also assumed the functions of Montero mayor (Great Hunter)—an office created during the reign of Isabella II—was the second-ranking official after the Mayordomo mayor, holding sole authority once the monarch left the royal palace. Only a peer with the rank of Grandee of Spain could be appointed to this office. The annual salary was 15,000 pesetas, the same as that of the Mayordomo mayor, and the Caballerizo mayor was also entitled to a private office at the Royal Palace of Madrid.

Reporting to the Caballerizo mayor were the Primer Caballerizo (First Equerry) and the Primer Montero (First Hunter), each with an annual salary of 7,500 pesetas. Below them were the Caballerizos de campo (Equerries), who were typically army officers.

The Caballerizo mayor accompanied the king on all journeys, referred to as "days," and sat beside him in carriages, automobiles, trains, or ships both within Spain and abroad. Together with the Primer Caballerizo, he was head of the royal mews and also chief of the Armory of the Royal Palace of Madrid.

In his capacity as Montero mayor, and with the assistance of the Primer Montero, he managed the hunting lodges of the Crown's heritage and organised royal hunts in the hunting grounds of the Crown, such as the Royal forests of El Pardo, the Royal Hunting Lodge of La Encomienda de Mudela, and the royal forests of Valsaín. At hunts organised by others but attended by the king, the Montero mayor was also present in his official role. The uniform of the Montero mayor consisted of very dark green cloth decorated with oak-branch embroidery.

At public chapels and official ceremonies, the Caballerizo mayor normally stood directly behind the Mayordomo mayor. He was styled Excelentísimo señor Caballerizo y Montero mayor de Su Majestad.

The office was suppressed after the proclamation of the Second Spanish Republic in 1931 and was not reinstated following the restoration of the monarchy in 1975.

== List of Caballerizos mayores (Great Equerries) to the King of Spain, 1515–1931 ==
=== Caballerizos mayores under Emperor Charles V (1515–1556) ===
- 1515–1522: Charles de Lannoy, Grandee of Spain
- 1522–1526: Cesare Ferramosca
- 1526–1529: Adrien de Croy, Count of Roeulx
- 1529–1530: Guillermo de Monfort, Lord of Montfort
- 1530–1556: Jehan Lenin-Liéthard, Count of Bossu, Grandee of Spain
- 1556: Sieur de Dandelot

=== Caballerizos mayores under King Philip II (1556–1598) ===
- 1556–1579: Antonio de Toledo
- 1598: Diego Fernández de Córdoba, Lord of Armuña

=== Caballerizos mayores under King Philip III (1598–1621) ===
- 1598–1618: Francisco de Sandoval y Rojas, Duke of Lerma, Grandee of Spain
- 1618–1621: Cristóbal Gómez de Sandoval y de la Cerda, Duke of Uceda, Grandee of Spain

=== Caballerizos mayores under King Philip IV (1621–1665) ===
- 1621–1624: Juan Hurtado de Mendoza, Consort-Duke of the Infantado, Grandee of Spain
- 1624–1643: Gaspar de Guzmán, Count-Duke of Olivares, Grandee of Spain
- 1643–1648: Diego López de Haro Sotomayor y Guzmán, Marquess of Carpio, Grandee of Spain
- 1648–1661: Luis Méndez de Haro, Marquess of Carpio, Grandee of Spain
- 1661–1665: Fernando de Borja, Prince of Squillace and Count of Mayalde, Grandee of Spain

=== Caballerizos mayores under King Charles II (1665–1701) ===
- 1667–1669: Pedro Portocarrero de Córdoba y Aragón, Duke of Camiña, Grandee of Spain
- 1669–1675: Francisco de Moura Corte-Real y Melo, Marquess of Castel-Rodrigo, Grandee of Spain
- 1675–1683: Juan Gaspar Enríquez de Cabrera y Sandoval, Duke of Medina de Rioseco, Admiral of Castile, Grandee of Spain
- 1683–1687: Juan Francisco de la Cerda, Duke of Medinaceli, Grandee of Spain
- 1687–1688: Francisco Fernández de Córdoba, Duke of Sessa, Grandee of Spain
- 1693–1701: Juan Tomás Enriquez de Cabrera, Duke of Medina de Rioseco, Admiral of Castile, Grandee of Spain

=== Caballerizos mayores under King Philip V (1701–1724) ===
- 1701–1713: Juan Clarós Pérez de Guzmán y Fernández de Córdoba, Duke of Medina Sidonia, Grandee of Spain
- 1715–1721: Francesco Maria Pico, Duke of Mirandola, Grandee of Spain
- 1721–1724: Alonso Manrique de Lara, Duke of Arco, Grandee of Spain

=== Caballerizo mayor under King Louis I (1724) ===
- 1724: Alonso Manrique de Lara, Duke of Arco, Grandee of Spain

=== Caballerizos mayores under King Philip V (1724–1746) ===
- 1724–1737: Alonso Manrique de Lara, Duke of Arco, Grandee of Spain
- 1737–1746: Manuel de Benavides y Aragón, Duke of Santisteban del Puerto, Grandee of Spain

=== Caballerizos mayores under King Ferdinand VI (1746–1759) ===
- 1746–1749: Francisco VI Fernández de la Cueva y de la Cerda, Duke of Alburquerque, Grandee of Spain
- 1749–1759: Luis Fernández de Córdoba y Spínola, Duke of Medinaceli, Grandee of Spain

=== Caballerizos mayores under King Charles III (1759–1788) ===
- 1759–1768: Luis Fernández de Córdoba y Spínola, Duke of Medinaceli, Grandee of Spain
- 1768–1777: Pedro de Alcántara Pérez de Guzmán y Pacheco, Duke of Medina Sidonia, Grandee of Spain
- 1780–1788: Felipe López Pacheco de la Cueva, Marquess of Villena, Grandee of Spain

=== Caballerizos mayores under King Charles IV (1788–1808) ===
- 1788–1798: Felipe López Pacheco de la Cueva, Marquess of Villena, Grandee of Spain
- 1798–1801: Juan de la Cruz Belbis de Moncada y Pizarro, Marquess of Bélgida
- 1801–1808: Vicente Joaquín Osorio de Moscoso y Guzmán, Marquess of Astorga, Grandee of Spain

=== Caballerizos mayores under King Ferdinand VII (1808; 1814–1833) ===
- 1808: Vicente Joaquín Osorio de Moscoso y Guzmán, Marquess of Astorga, Grandee of Spain
- 1814–1822: Juan de la Cruz Belbis de Moncada y Pizarro, Marquess of Bélgida
- 1822–1823: Vicente Isabel Osorio de Moscoso y Álvarez de Toledo, Marquess of Astorga, Grandee of Spain
- 1823–1833: Juan de la Cruz Belbis de Moncada y Pizarro, Marquess of Bélgida

=== Caballerizos mayores under Queen Isabella II (1833–1868) ===
- 1833–1838: Fernando de Aguilera y Contreras, Marquess of Cerralbo, Grandee of Spain
- 1838–1839: Ángel María de Carvajal y Fernández de Córdoba y Gonzaga, Duke of Abrantes, Grandee of Spain
- 1839–1854: Joaquín Fernández de Córdoba Pacheco, Duke of Arión, Grandee of Spain
- 1854: Mariano Patricio de Guillamas y Galiano, Marquess of San Felices, Grandee of Spain
- 1854–1856: Vicente Pío Osorio de Moscoso y Ponce de León, Duke of Montemar, Grandee of Spain
- 1856–1859: Francisco Javier Arias Dávila y Matheu, Count of Puñonrostro, Grandee of Spain
- 1860–1868: Fernando Díaz de Mendoza y Valcárcel, Count of Lalaing, Grandee of Spain

=== Caballerizo mayor under King Amadeo I (1871–1873) ===
- 1871: Carlos O'Donnell, Duke of Tetuan, Grandee of Spain (1)

=== Caballerizo mayor under King Alfonso XII (1875–1885) ===
- 1875–1885: José Isidro Osorio y Silva-Bazán, Marquess of Alcañices, Grandee of Spain

=== Caballerizos mayores under King Alfonso XIII (1885–1931) ===
- 1885–1900: José Joaquín Álvarez de Toledo y Silva, Duke of Medina Sidonia, Grandee of Spain (1)
- 1903–1906: Manuel Felipe Falcó y Ossorio, Marquess of la Mina, Grandee of Spain
- 1906–1927: José de Saavedra y Salamanca, Marquess of Viana, Grandee of Spain
- 1927–1931: Baltasar de Losada y Torres, Count of Maceda, Grandee of Spain

(1) From 1871 to 1873 the office was suppressed. From 1900 to 1903 the office remained vacant.

== List of Primeros Caballerizos (First Equerries) to the King of Spain, 1875–1931 ==
=== Primeros Caballerizos under King Alfonso XII (1875–1885) ===
- 1875–1876: Ricardo Castellví e Ibarrola, Count of Carlet
- 1876–1885: Ignacio de Arteaga y Puente, Count of El Pilar

=== Primeros Caballerizos under King Alfonso XIII (1885–1931) ===
- 1885–1894: Ignacio de Arteaga y Puente, Count of El Pilar
- 1894–1903: Bernardo Ulibarri
- 1903–1912: Rodrigo Álvarez de Toledo
- 1912–1914: Fernando Moreno de Tejada y Díaz de Cabria, Count of Fuenteblanca
- 1914–1931: Miguel Tacón y Calderón, Duke of La Unión de Cuba, Grandee of Spain

== List of Primeros Monteros (First Hunters) to the King of Spain, 1875–1931 ==
=== Primer Montero under King Alfonso XII (1875–1885) ===
- 1875–1885: Honorio de Samaniego y Pando, Count of Villapaterna

=== Primeros Monteros under King Alfonso XIII (1885–1931) ===
- 1885–1893: Honorio de Samaniego y Pando, Count of Villapaterna
- 1903–1927: Baltasar de Losada y Torres, Count of Maceda
- 1927–1931: Alonso Álvarez de Toledo y Samaniego, Marquess of Valdueza

== See also ==
- Mayordomo mayor
- Gentilhombres de cámara con ejercicio
- Gentilhombres Grandes de España con ejercicio y servidumbre

== Bibliography ==
- Enciclopedia universal ilustrada europeo-americana. Volume 49. Hijos de J. Espasa, Editores.1923
- Martínez Millán José. Universidad Autónoma de Madrid. Departamento de Historia Moderna. La Corte de Carlos V. 2000
- Martinéz Millán (dir). José. La Corte de Felipe II. Madrid. Alianza 1994
- Martínez Millán, José y Visceglia, Maria Antonietta (Dirs.). La Monarquía de Felipe III. Madrid, Fundación Mapfre, 2008/2009
- Archivo General de Palacio (AGP) . Patrimonio Nacional. Sección Personal
