= Duke of Medina de las Torres =

Dukedom of Spain

Dukedom of Medina de las Torres
- Creation date: 5 January 1625
- Created by: Philip IV
- Peerage: Peerage of Spain
- First holder: Gaspar de Guzmán y Pimentel, 1st Duke of Medina de las Torres
- Present holder: José Gonzalo Ruiz de Bucesta y de Mora, 14th Duke of Medina de las Torres

Duke of Medina de las Torres (Spanish: Duque de Medina de las Torres) is a hereditary title in the Peerage of Spain, accompanied by the dignity of Grandee and granted in 1625 by Philip IV to Gaspar de Guzmán, 3rd Count of Olivares and royal favourite to the king. A few days later, the king granted him the Dukedom of Sanlúcar la Mayor.

The title was created in favor of the first holder to endow his only daughter and heir, María de Guzmán y Zúñiga, to marry Ramiro Núñez de Guzmán, 2nd Marquess of Toral. Upon the death of his daughter, he asked the king to accept his resignation from the dukedom and that it be granted to his son-in-law, who became the 2nd Duke of Medina de las Torres.

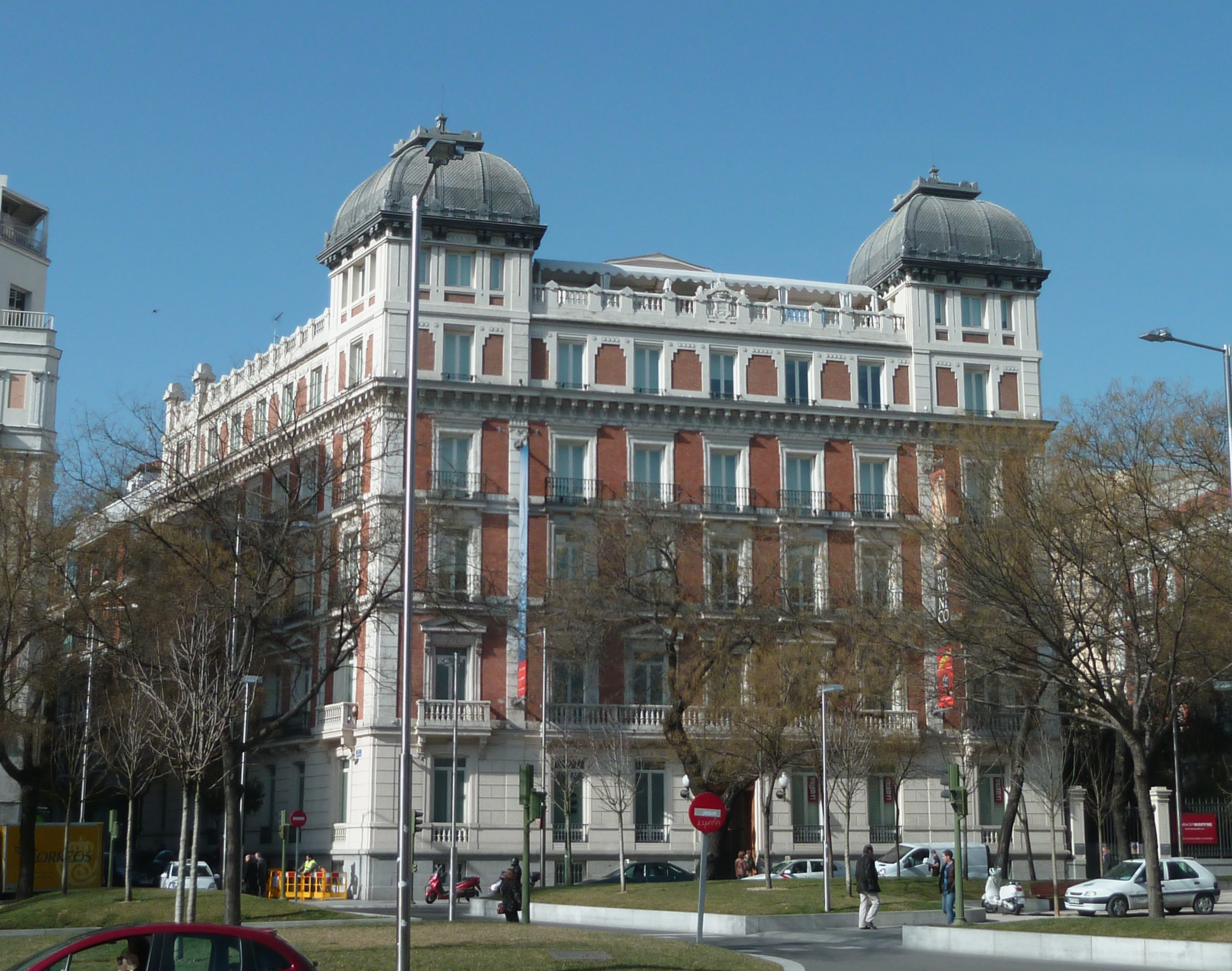
Palace of the Dukes of Medina de las Torres in Madrid

== Dukes of Sanlúcar la Mayor (1625) ==
- Gaspar de Guzmán y Pimentel, 1st Duke of Medina de las Torres
- Ramiro Núñez de Guzmán, 2nd Duke of Medina de las Torres
- Nicolás María de Guzmán y Caraffa, 3rd Duke of Medina de las Torres
- Mariana Sinforosa de Guzmán y Guevara, 4th Duchess of Medina de las Torres
- Antonio Gaspar de Moscoso Osorio y Aragón, 5th Duke of Medina de las Torres
- Ventura Antonio de Osorio de Moscoso y Guzmán, 6th Duke of Medina de las Torres
- Ventura Osorio de Moscoso y Fernández de Córdoba, 7th Duke of Medina de las Torres
- Vicente Joaquín Osorio de Moscoso y Guzmán, 8th Duke of Medina de las Torres
- Vicente Isabel Osorio de Moscoso y Álvarez de Toledo, 9th Duke of Medina de las Torres
- Vicente Pío Osorio de Moscoso y Ponce de León, 10th Duke of Medina de las Torres
- María Eulalia Osorio de Moscoso y Carvajal, 11th Duchess of Sanlúcar la Mayor
- Fernando Osorio de Moscoso y López de Ansó, 12th Duke of Sanlúcar la Mayor
- José María Ruiz de Bucesta y Osorio de Moscoso, 13th Duke of Sanlúcar la Mayor
- José Gonzalo Ruiz de Bucesta y de Mora, 14th Duke of Medina de las Torres

== See also ==
- List of dukes in the peerage of Spain
- List of current grandees of Spain
