= Diego de Benavides, 8th Count of Santisteban =

Spanish military officer, diplomat, writer and colonial administrator

Don Diego de Benavides de la Cueva Marquess of Solera Count of Santisteban del Puerto
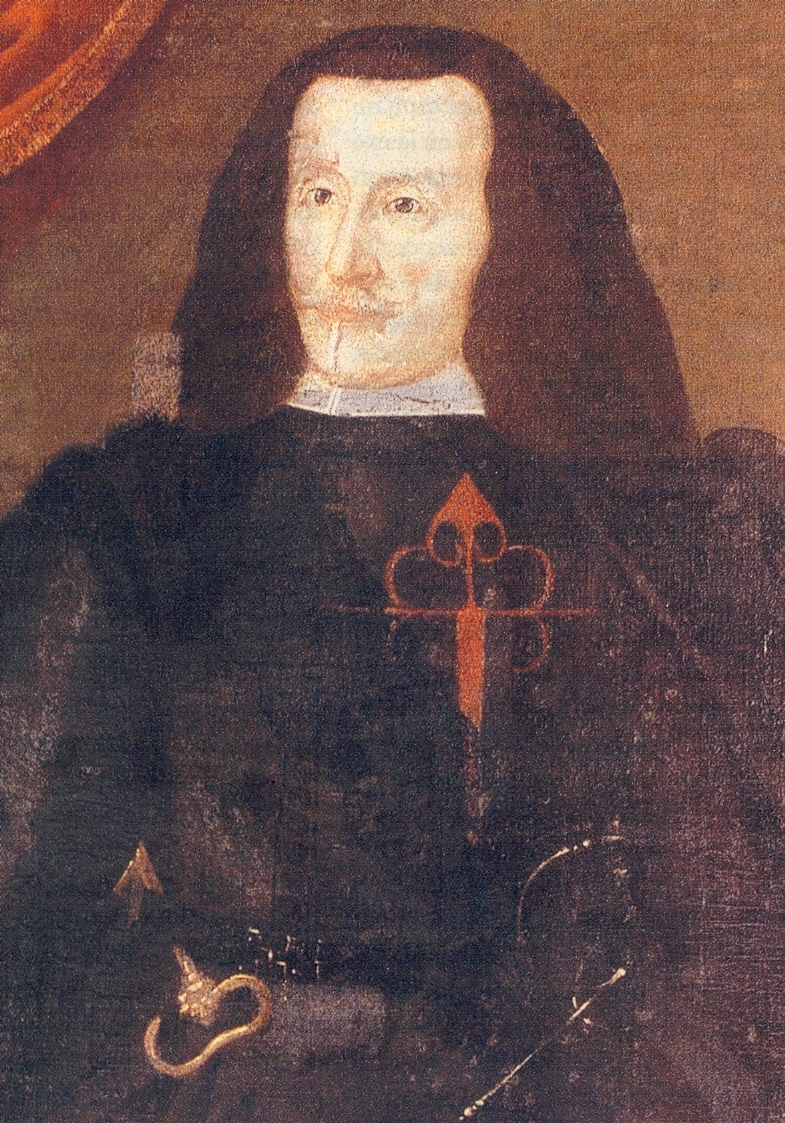

Viceroy of Peru
- In office December 31, 1661 – March 16, 1666
- Monarch: Philip IV
- Preceded by: Luis Enríquez de Guzmán
- Succeeded by: Bernardo de Iturriaza

Personal details
- Born: 1607 Santisteban del Puerto
- Died: c. March 19, 1666 Lima
- Resting place: Convent of Santo Domingo
- Children: Francisco de Benavides

Don Diego de Benavides de la Cueva y Bazán, 1st Marquess of Solera and 8th Count of Santisteban del Puerto (Note: Sometimes Don Diego Benavides y de la Cueva, conde de Santisteban del Puerto.) (1607, Santisteban del Puerto, Jaén, Spain – ca. March 19, 1666, Lima, Peru), was a Spanish military officer, diplomat, writer and colonial administrator. From December 31, 1661, to March 16, 1666, he was viceroy of Peru.

== Biography ==
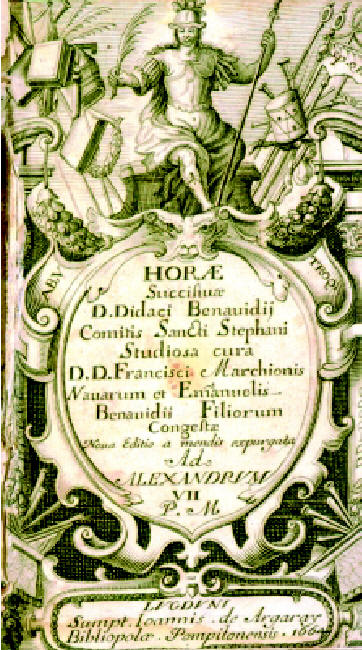
Diego de Benavides, Horae succisiuae siue Elucubrationes, title page of the 1664 edition

Benavides received a Humanistic education with the Jesuits of the Colegio Imperial de Madrid.

He was a Knight of the Order of Santiago and a gentleman of the king's bedchamber. He fought in Aragon and Portugal. After the 1643 war with Portugal, he was Captain General of the Borders. Later he was Governor of Galicia. In 1653 he was named Viceroy and Captain General of Navarre. For his valuable diplomatic services in the negotiation of the 1659 Peace of the Pyrenees and the subsequent marriage of Princess Maria Teresa of Austria with Louis XIV of France, King Philip IV made him Marquis de Solera.

His writings included Epigramas latinos del humanista giennense D. Diego de Benavides y de la Cueva (Latin epigrams) and Horae succisiuae siue Elucubrationes. The latter work was a poetic anthology compiled by his sons Francisco and Manuel de Benavides and published in 1660 (second edition, 1664).

In 1661 he was named Viceroy of Peru. During his administration, he was much concerned about the condition of the Indigenous, particularly their education and labor conditions. To address these concerns he issued the Ordenanza de Obrajes (Ordenance of Manufactures) in 1664.

He faced earthquakes to epidemics, and had to suppress fighting between Spanish miners. San Bartolomé hospital was built during his term of office. He built the first theater in Lima. He died in that city in 1666.

He married three times and had eight children, including :

- Francisco de Benavides (1640–1716), 9th Count of Santisteban del Puerto and Viceroy
- María Teresa de Benavídes, married Íñigo Melchor de Velasco, 7th Duke of Frías
- María Josefa de Benavides, married Juan Manuel Fernández Pacheco, 8th Duke of Escalona

== See also ==
- List of Viceroys of Peru

== Notes ==
Government offices
Preceded by Fernando Andrade Sotomayor	Governor of Galicia; 1647–1649	Succeeded by Fernando Andrade Sotomayor
Preceded by Diego López Pacheco	Viceroy of Navarre; 1653–1653	Succeeded by Antonio Álvarez de Toledo
Preceded by Luis Enríquez de Guzmán	Viceroy of Peru; 1661–1666	Succeeded by Bernardo de Iturriaza
Spanish nobility
Preceded by Francisco de Benavides	Count of Santisteban del Puerto; 1650–1666	Succeeded by Francisco de Benavides
New title	Marquess of Solera; 1659–1666	Succeeded by Francisco de Benavides
