= Vicente Osorio de Moscoso, 11th Count of Altamira =

Spanish peer, politician and diplomat

The Most Excellent The Count of Altamira GE
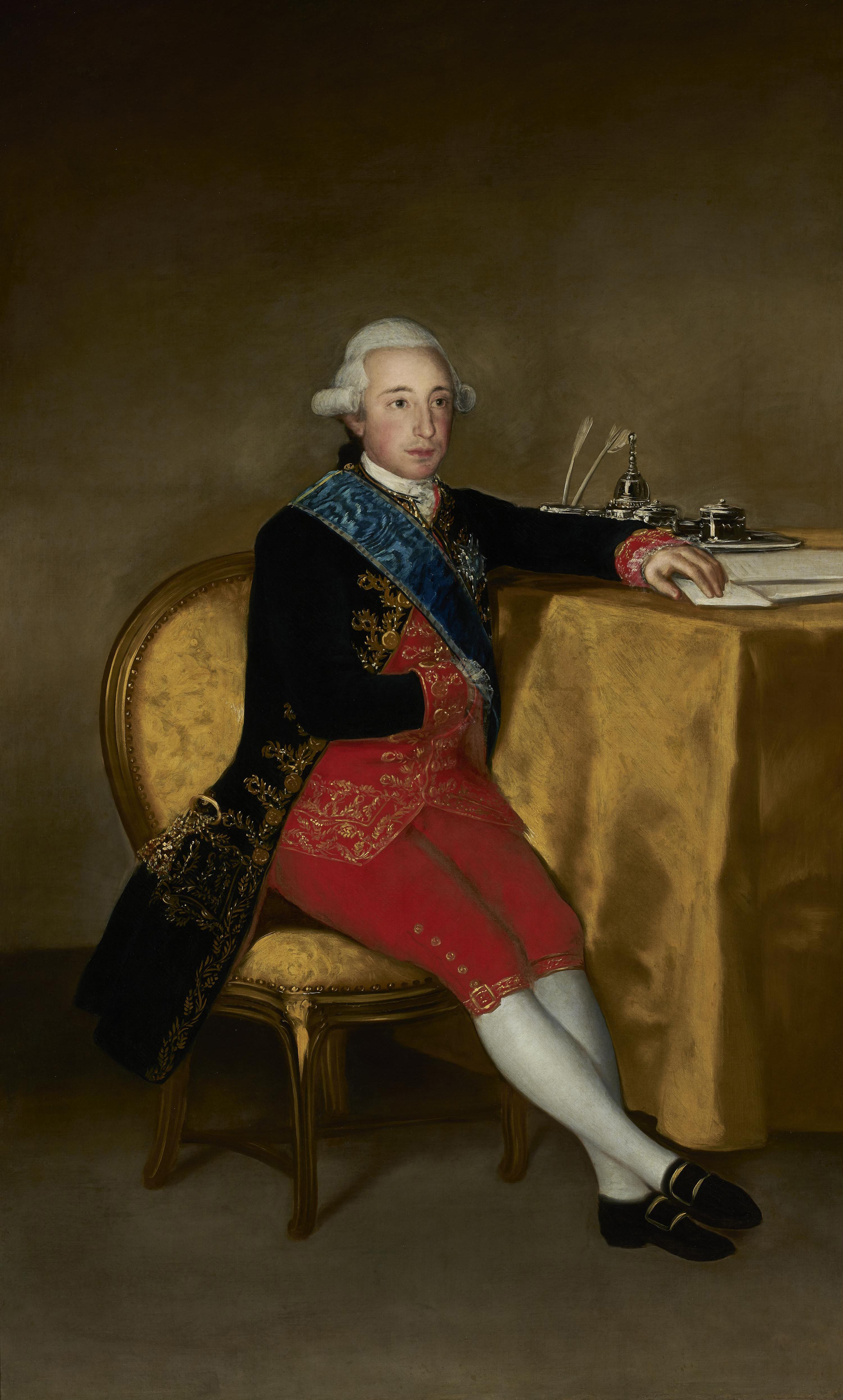
- Portrait by Goya, c. 1786

Personal details
- Born: Vicente Joaquín Osorio de Moscoso y Guzmán; 10 January 1756 Madrid, Spain
- Died: 26 August 1816 (aged 60) Madrid, Spain
- Spouse: María Ignacia Álvarez de Toledo y Gonzaga
- Children: Vicente Isabel Osorio de Moscoso y Álvarez de Toledo, 12th Count of Altamira
- Parents: Ventura Osorio de Moscoso y Fernández de Córdoba, 10th Count of Altamira (father); María de la Concepción de Guzmán y de la Cerda (mother)

Vicente Joaquín Osorio de Moscoso y Guzmán, 11th Count of Altamira, GE (10 January 1756 – 26 August 1816), was a Spanish peer, politician and diplomat who served as Consejero de Estado and president of the Junta Central during the reign of Charles IV. He was also ambassador in Vienna and Turin.

== Biography ==
Vicente Joaquín was born in Madrid the 10 January 1756, son of Ventura Osorio de Moscoso y Fernández de Córdoba, who was the 10th Count of Altamira. His mother was María de la Concepción de Guzmán y de la Cerda, daughter of the Marquesses of Montealegre and Aguilar de Campoo.

Familiarly linked to the court of the Kingdom of Spain, his family had held important positions; being his grandfather, his great-grandfather and his great-great-grandfather Sumiller de Corps of different kings.

He married on 3 April 1774, with María Ignacia Álvarez de Toledo y Gonzaga, daughter of Antonio Álvarez de Toledo y Osorio, 10th Marquess of Villafranca del Bierzo and two years later, his father died, thus inheriting his immense fortune. His mother also died in the same year as his father.

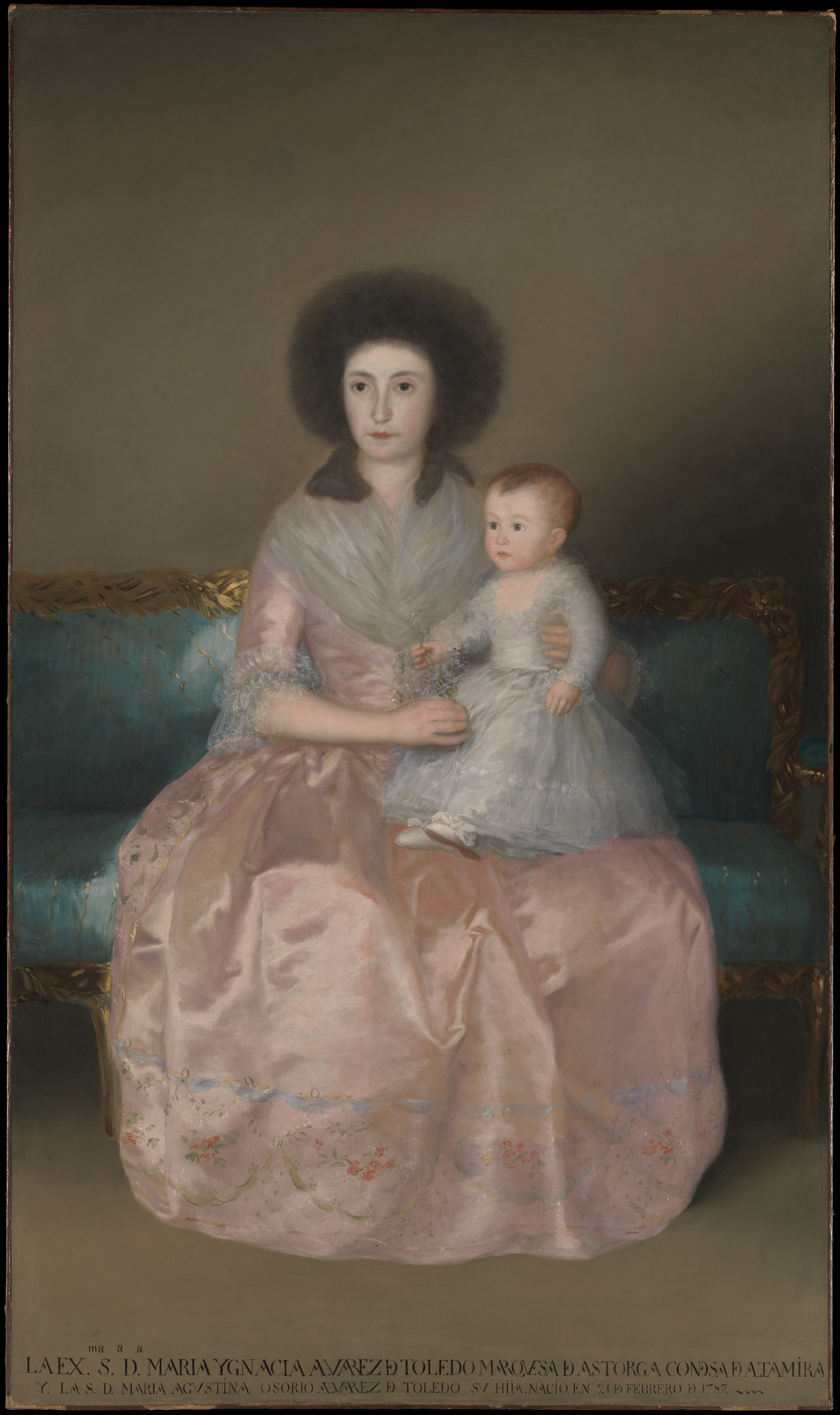
1787 portrait of Osorio's wife and daughter by Goya, Metropolitan Museum of Art

Charles III appointed him, shortly after, governor of the Banco de San Carlos, the main bank in the country at the time.

He also finished the works on his Palacio de Altamira in Madrid, begun by his father and designed by Ventura Rodríguez.

Widowed in 1798, Charles IV chose him in 1801 as his main caballerizo mayor.

On 11 December 1806 he married for a second time, with María Magdalena Fernández de Córdoba y Ponce de León. After the Motín de Aranjuez, the new king Ferdinand VII confirmed him in his post, although for a short time, since months later, he fled to Bayonne.

During the War of Independence he belonged to the Junta Suprema Central and became its president (1808-1809).

He died in Madrid the 26 August 1816.

== Titles held ==
=== Dukedoms ===
- 15th Duke of Maqueda (GE)
- 11th Duke of Baena (GE)
- 13th Duke of Sessa (GE)
- 12th Duke of Soma (GE)
- 9th Duke of Sanlúcar la Mayor (GE)
- 7th Duke of Medina de las Torres (GE)
- 6th Duke of Atrisco (GE)
- 12th Duke of Terranova (GE) - held unofficially due to extinction
- 12th Duke of Santángelo (GE) - held unofficially due to extinction
- 12th Duke of Andría (GE) - held unofficially due to extinction

=== Marquessates ===
- 16th Marquess of Astorga (GE)
- 7th Marquess of Castromonte (GE)
- 7th Marquess of Leganés (GE)
- 10th Marquess of Velada (GE)
- 10th Marquess of Almazán
- 11th Marquess of Poza
- 7th Marquess of Mairena
- 6th Marquess of Morata de la Vega
- 7th Marquess of Monasterio
- 13th Marquess of Ayamonte
- 8th Marquess of Villamanrique
- 8th Marquess of Villa de San Román
- 15th Marquess of Elche
- 10th Marquess of Montemayor
- 9th Marquess of Águila

=== Countships ===
- 11th Count of Altamira (GE)
- 12th Count of Cabra (GE)
- 17th Count of Palamós
- 13th Count of Trivento
- 13th Countof Avellino
- 12th Count of Oliveto
- 15th Count of Monteagudo de Mendoza
- 10th Count of Losada
- 8th Count of Arzacóllar
- 12th Count of Trastámara
- 15th Count of Santa María de Ortigueira
- 10th Count of Lodosa
- 9th Count of Saltés
- 18th Count of Nieva
- 4th Count of Garcíez
- 3rd Count of Valhermoso
- ? Count of Cantillana

=== Viscountcies ===
- 12th Viscount of Iznájar

=== Baronies ===
- 22nd Baron of Bellpuig
- 13th Baron of Calonge
- 14th Baron Liñola

== See also ==
- List of dukes in the peerage of Spain
- List of current grandees of Spain
