= Duke of Atrisco =

Dukedom of Spain

Dukedom of Atrisco
- Creation date: 17 April 1708
- Created by: Philip V
- Peerage: Peerage of Spain
- First holder: José Sarmiento de Valladares y Arines, 1st Duke of Atrisco
- Present holder: Adelaida Barón y Carral, 13th Duchess of Atrisco

Duke of Atrisco (Spanish: Duque de Atrisco) is a hereditary title in the Peerage of Spain, accompanied by the dignity of Grandee and granted in 1708 by Philip V to José Sarmiento de Valladares, for his services as viceroy of New Spain.

The 1st Duke married the 3rd Countess of Moctezuma, granddaughter of Pedro Tesifón de Moctezuma, who in turn was a great-grandson of Moctezuma II, so, in this way, the Dukes of Atrisco were relatives of the Aztec emperor.

The name makes reference to the city of Atlixco, one of the three existing lordships in New Spain in 1708.

== Dukes of Atrisco (1708) ==
- José Sarmiento de Valladares y Arines, 1st Duke of Atrisco
- Melchora Juana Sarmiento de Valladares y Moctezuma, 2nd Duchess of Atrisco
- Bernarda Dominga Sarmiento de Valladares y Guzmán, 3rd Duchess of Atrisco
- Ana Nicolasa de Guzmán y Córdoba, 4th Duchess of Atrisco
- Ventura Osorio de Moscoso y Fernández de Córdoba, 5th Duke of Atrisco
- Vicente Joaquín Osorio de Moscoso y Guzmán, 6th Duke of Atrisco
- Vicente Isabel Osorio de Moscoso y Álvarez de Toledo, 7th Duke of Atrisco
- Vicente Pío Osorio de Moscoso y Ponce de León, 8th Duke of Atrisco
- María Cristina Osorio de Moscoso y Borbón, 9th Duchess of Atrisco
- Pedro de Alcántara de Bauffremont y Osorio de Moscoso, 10th Duke of Atrisco
- Leopoldo Barón y Osorio de Moscoso, 11th Duke of Atrisco
- Gonzalo Barón y Gavito, 12th Duke of Atrisco
- Adelaida Barón y Carral, 13th Duchess of Atrisco

== See also ==
- List of dukes in the peerage of Spain
- List of current grandees of Spain
