= Duke of Soma =

Dukedom of Spain

Dukedom of Soma
- Creation date: 12 December 1502
- Created by: Ferdinand II
- Peerage: Peerage of Spain
- First holder: Ramón Folch de Cardona y Requesens, 1st Duke of Soma
- Present holder: Jaime Ruiz de Buscesta y de Mora, 18th Duke of Soma

Duke of Soma (Spanish: Duque de Soma) is a hereditary title in the Peerage of Spain, accompanied by the dignity of Grandee and granted in 1502 by Ferdinand II to Ramón Folch de Cardona, 11th Baron of Bellpuig and 1st Count of Oliveto, for his services as viceroy of Sicily.

The name makes reference to the town of Somma Vesuviana, in Naples, Italy.

== Dukes of Soma (1502) ==
- Ramón Folch de Cardona y Requesens, 1st Duke of Soma
  Portrait of the 1st Duke of Soma's wife, Isabel de Requesens, by Raphael, c. 1518, Louvre
- Fernando Folch de Cardona y Requesens, 2nd Duke of Soma
- Luis Folch de Cardona y Fernández de Córdoba, 3rd Duke of Soma
- Antonio Folch de Cardona y Fernández de Córdoba, 4th Duke of Soma
- Luis Fernández de Córdoba y Aragón, 5th Duke of Soma
- Antonio Fernández de Córdoba y de Rojas, 6th Duke of Soma
- Francisco Fernández de Córdoba y de Rojas, 7th Duke of Soma
- Félix María Fernández de Córdoba y Fernández de Córdoba, 8th Duke of Soma
- Francisco Javier Fernández de Córdoba y Fernández de Córdoba, 9th Duke of Soma
- Buenaventura Francisca Fernández de Córdoba y Fernández de Córdoba, 10th Duchess of Soma
- Ventura Osorio de Moscoso y Fernández de Córdoba, 11th Duke of Soma
- Vicente Joaquín Osorio de Moscoso y Guzmán, 12th Duke of Soma
- Vicente Isabel Osorio de Moscoso y Álvarez de Toledo, 13th Duke of Soma
- Vicente Pío Osorio de Moscoso y Ponce de León, 14th Duke of Soma
- Alfonso Osorio de Moscoso y Osorio de Moscoso, 15th Duke of Soma
- María Eulalia Osorio de Moscoso y López de Ansó, 16th Duchess of Soma
- José María Ruiz de Bucesta y Osorio de Moscoso, 17th Duke of Soma
- Jaime Ruiz de Bucesta y de Mora, 18th Duke of Soma

== See also ==
- List of dukes in the peerage of Spain
- List of current grandees of Spain
