= Marquess of Astorga =

Hereditary title in the Peerage of Spain

Marquessate of Astorga
- Creation date: 6 July 1465
- Created by: Henry IV of Castile
- Peerage: Peerage of Spain
- First holder: Álvar Pérez Osorio, 1st Marquess of Astorga
- Present holder: María del Pilar Paloma de Casanova-Cárdenas y Barón, 22nd Marchioness of Astorga

Marquess of Astorga (Spanish: Marqués de Astorga) is a hereditary title in the Peerage of Spain, accompanied by the dignity of Grandee and granted in 1465 by Henry IV to Álvar Pérez Osorio, 2nd Count of Trastámara and captain general of Galicia and Asturias.

The title makes reference to the town of Astorga in León.

== Marquesses of Astorga (1465) ==
- Álvar Pérez Osorio, 1st Marquess of Astorga
- Pedro Álvarez Osorio y Enríquez, 2nd Marquess of Astorga
- Álvar Pérez Osorio y Quiñones, 3rd Marquess of Astorga
- Pedro Álvarez Osorio y Sarmiento, 4th Marquess of Astorga
- Álvar Pérez Osorio y Pimentel, 5th Marquess of Astorga
- Antonio Pedro Álvarez Osorio y Álvarez de Toledo, 6th Marquess of Astorga
- Alonso Álvarez Osorio y Quiñones, 7th Marquess of Astorga
- Pedro Álvarez Osorio y Osorio, 8th Marquess of Astorga
- Álvar Pérez Osorio y Manrique, 9th Marquess of Astorga
- Antonio Pedro Dávila y Osorio, 10th Marquess of Astorga
- Ana Dávila y Osorio, 11th Marchioness of Astorga
- Melchor Francisco de Guzmán y Dávila, 12th Marquess of Astorga
- Ana Nicolasa de Guzmán y Fernández de Córdoba, 13th Marchioness of Astorga
- Ventura Antonio Osorio de Moscoso y Fernández de Córdoba, 14th Marquess of Astorga
- Vicente Joaquín Osorio de Moscoso y Guzmán, 15th Marquess of Astorga
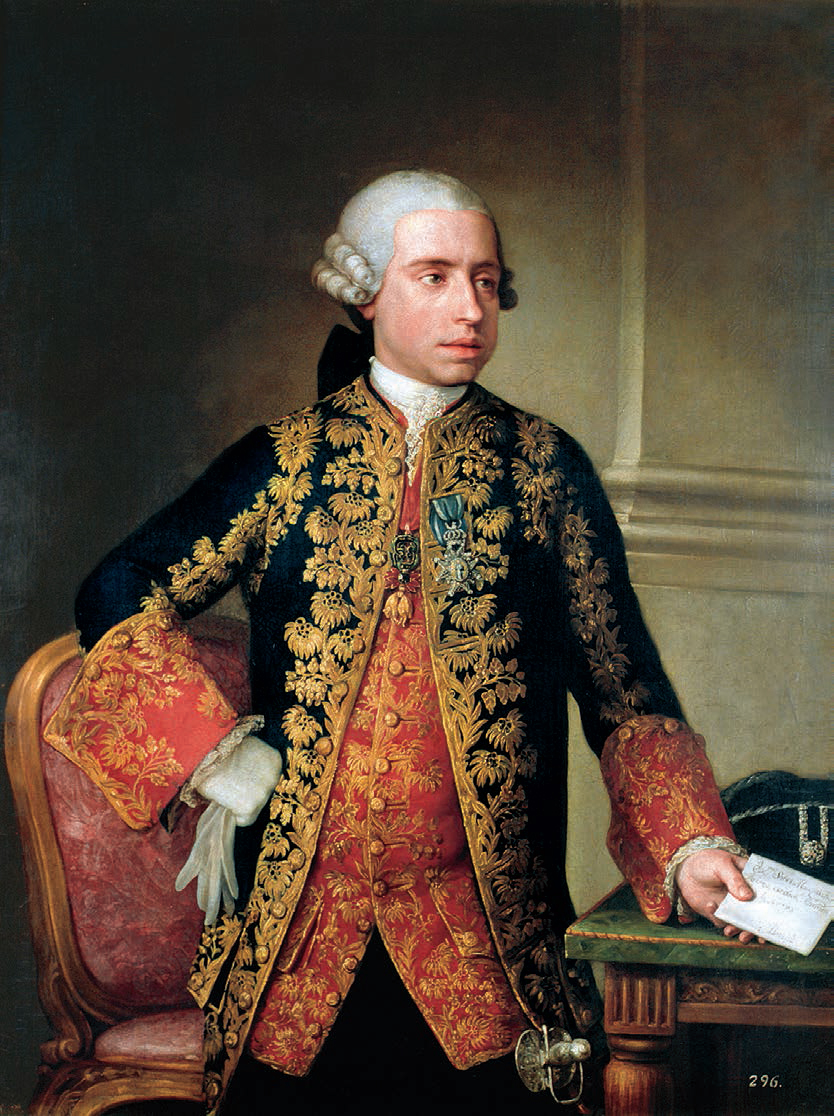
  The 15th Marquess of Astorga by Anton Raphael Mengs, 1775
- Vicente Isabel Osorio de Moscoso y Álvarez de Toledo, 16th Marquess of Astorga
- Vicente Pío Osorio de Moscoso y Ponce de León, 17th Marquess of Astorga
- José María Osorio de Moscoso y Carvajal, 18th Marquess of Astorga
- Francisco de Asís Osorio de Moscoso y de Borbón, 19th Marquess of Astorga
- Francisco de Asís Osorio de Moscoso y Jordán de Urríes, 20th Marquess of Astorga
- María del Perpetuo Socorro Osorio de Moscoso y Reynoso, 21st Marchioness of Astorga
- Gonzalo Barón y Gavito, 22nd Marques of Astorga
- María del Pilar Paloma de Casanova-Cárdenas y Barón, 23rd Marchioness of Astorga

== See also ==
- List of current grandees of Spain
