= Duke of Maqueda =

Dukedom of Spain

Dukedom of Maqueda
- Creation date: 1529
- Created by: Charles I
- Peerage: Peerage of Spain
- First holder: Diego de Cárdenas y Enríquez, 1st Duke of Maqueda
- Present holder: María del Pilar Paloma Casanova-Cárdenas y Barón, 24th Duchess of Maqueda

Duke of Maqueda (Spanish: Duque de Maqueda) is a hereditary title in the Peerage of Spain, accompanied by the dignity of Grandee and granted in 1529 by Charles I to Diego de Cárdenas, 2nd Lord of Maqueda and adelantado of the Kingdom of Granada.

The title makes reference to the town of Maqueda in Toledo.

== Dukes of Maqueda (1529) ==
- Diego de Cárdenas y Enríquez, 1st Duke of Maqueda
- Bernardino de Cárdenas y Pacheco, 2nd Duke of Maqueda
- Bernardino de Cárdenas y Portugal, 3rd Duke of Maqueda
- Jorge de Cárdenas y Manrique de Lara, 4th Duke of Maqueda
- Jaime Manuel de Cárdenas y Manrique de Lara, 5th Duke of Maqueda
- Francisco María de Monserrat Manrique de Cárdenas, 6th Duke of Maqueda
- Teresa Antonia Manrique de Mendoza, 7th Duchess of Maqueda
- Raimundo de Láncaster y Manrique, 8th Duke of Maqueda
- María Guadalupe de Láncaster y Manrique, 9th Duchess of Maqueda
- Manuel Ponce de León y Láncaster, 10th Duke of Maqueda
- Joaquín Cayetano Ponce de León y Spínola, 11th Duke of Maqueda
- Manuel Ponce de León y Spínola, 12th Duke of Maqueda
- Francisco Ponce de León y Spínola, 13th Duke of Maqueda
- Antonio Ponce de León y Spínola, 14th Duke of Maqueda
- Vicente Joaquín Osorio de Moscoso y Guzmán, 15th Duke of Maqueda
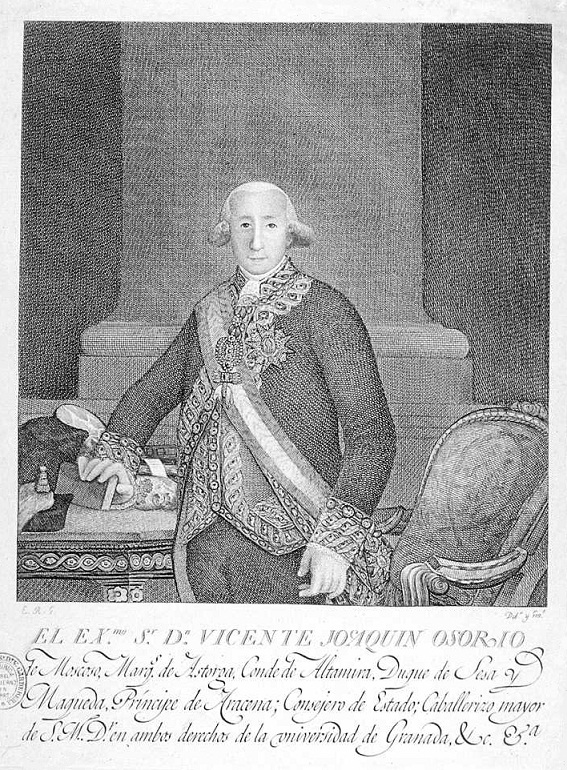
  19th century lithography of the 15th Duke of Maqueda
- Vicente Isabel Osorio de Moscoso y Álvarez de Toledo, 16th Duke of Maqueda
- Vicente Pío Osorio de Moscoso y Ponce de León, 17th Duke of Maqueda
- José María Osorio de Moscoso y Carvajal, 18th Duke of Maqueda
- Francisco de Asís Osorio de Moscoso y de Borbón, 19th Duke of Maqueda
- Francisco de Asís Osorio de Moscoso y Jordán de Urríes, 20th Duke of Maqueda
- María del Perpetuo Socorro Osorio de Moscoso y Reynoso, 21st Duchess of Maqueda
- María Dolores Barón y Osorio de Moscoso, 22nd Duchess of Maqueda
- Luis María Gonzaga de Casanova-Cárdenas y Barón, 23rd Duke of Maqueda
- María del Pilar Paloma de Casanova-Cárdenas y Barón, 24th Duchess of Maqueda

== See also ==
- List of dukes in the peerage of Spain
- List of current grandees of Spain
