= Manuel de Benavides y Aragón =

Spanish aristocrat

Manuel Domingo de Benavides y Aragón (Palermo, January 6, 1683 – Madrid, October 11, 1748), 10th Count and later 1st Duke of Santisteban del Puerto, was an aristocrat who served the Spanish Royal Household.

== Biography ==
He was the fourteenth of eighteen children born to Francisca Josefa de Aragón y Sandoval and Francisco de Benavides, 9th Count of Santisteban del Puerto. He was born in Palermo during his father's tenure as Viceroy of Sicily (1679–1688), a post he held with such success that King Charles II rewarded him with the title of Grandee of Spain.

At a very young age, he was placed in the service of Philip V of Spain, beginning his close relationship with this monarch.

On December 21, 1707, he married Ana Catalina de la Cueva y Arias de Saavedra, 9th Countess of Castellar, daughter of Baltasar de la Cueva, Count of Castellar, of the powerful House of Alburquerque, further consolidating his position at the Spanish Court. From this union were born three children:

- Antonio de Benavides (1714-1782), his successor,
- Francisca de Benavides (1715-1735), married Francisco Alonso Pimentel y Borja, XI Duke of Benavente,
- Joaquina de Benavides (1720-1793), married Ramón Fernández de Velasco, IV marqués del Fresno.

In 1716, his father died and Manuel succeeded to the family's noble titles, as his older brothers had predeceased him without issue, making him the only living male at the time of his father's death. Thus, he became the 10th Count of Benavides, 11th Count of Risco, 12th Count of Concentaina, 10th Marquis of Las Navas, and 5th Marquis of Solera.

In 1721, he was appointed Spain's plenipotentiary minister to the Cambrai Conferences in the aftermath of the War of the Quadruple Alliance (1718–1720).
Also in 1721, he was appointed Master of the Horse to the Prince of Asturias, Louis I of Spain. In practice, he acted as principal Master of the Horse due to the prolonged absences of the incumbent, Alfonso Manrique de Lara, 1st Duke of Arco. He was also President of the Council of Orders between 1725 and 1737.

When the King's son, Infante Charles III of Spain, ascended the thrones of Naples and Sicily in 1734, Santisteban, on the advice of Queen Isabel Farnese, became the young monarch's tutor and his Prime Minister, until he fell from grace in 1738, the year he returned to Madrid.

That year, he was appointed Master of the Horse to Philip V until the monarch's death, who recognized him with the noble title of Duke of Santisteban del Puerto, with the rank of Grandee, which was granted on July 28, 1738. He held the position of Master of the Horse until the new monarch, Ferdinand VI of Spain, accepted his resignation in 1746. He died two years later.
