= Sabiote =

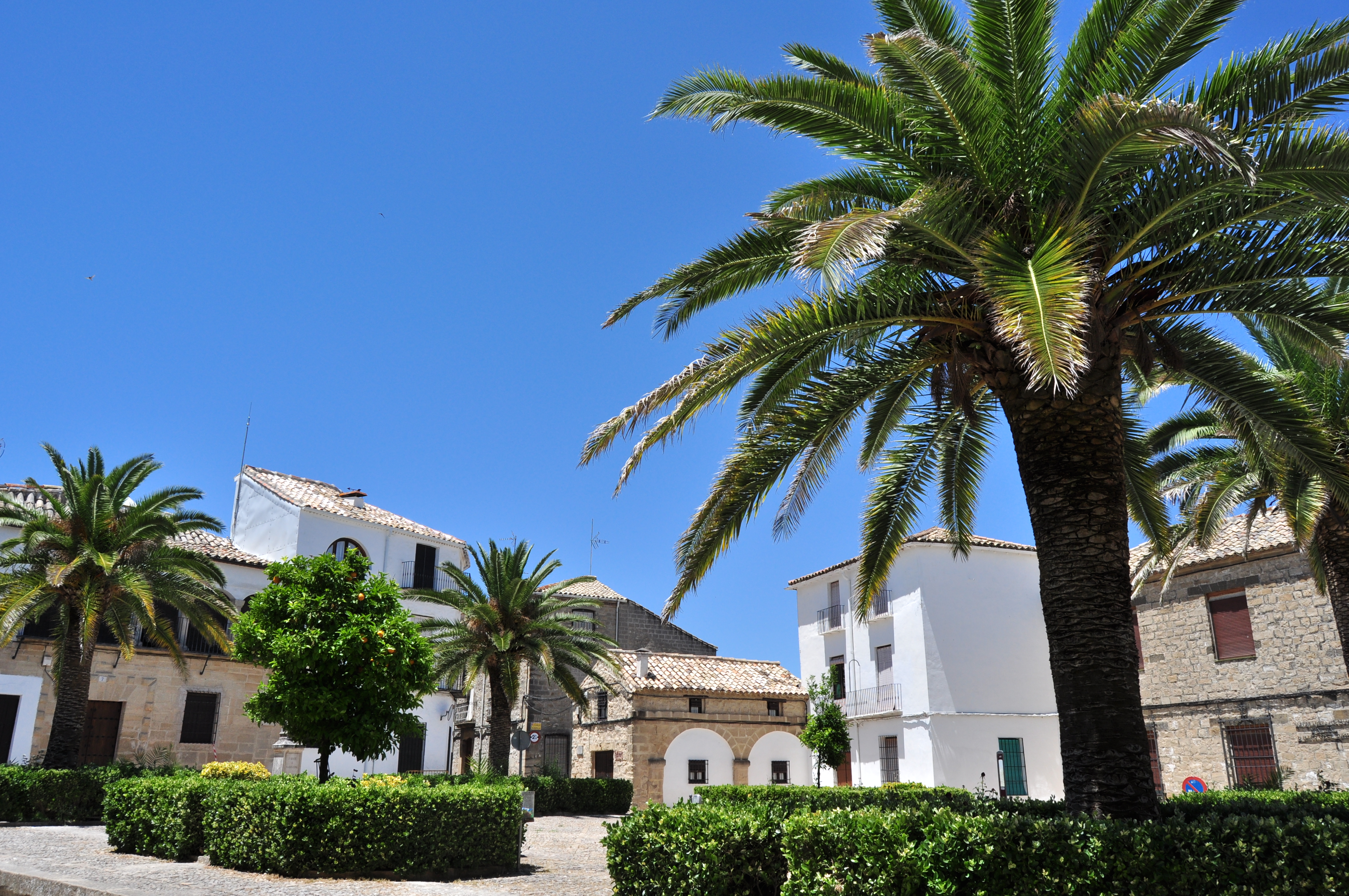
- Plaza de Alonso de Vandelvira

- Coat of arms

- Location in the Province of Jaén Sabiote (Andalusia) Sabiote (Spain)
- Coordinates: 38°04′N 3°18′W
- Country: Spain
- Autonomous community: Andalusia
- Province: Jaén

Area
  - Total: 112.19 km^{2} (43.32 sq mi)
- Elevation: 833 m (2,733 ft)

Population (2025-01-01)
  - Total: 3,742
  - Density: 33.35/km^{2} (86.39/sq mi)
- Time zone: UTC+1 (CET)
  - Summer (DST): UTC+2 (CEST)
- Website: www.sabiote.com

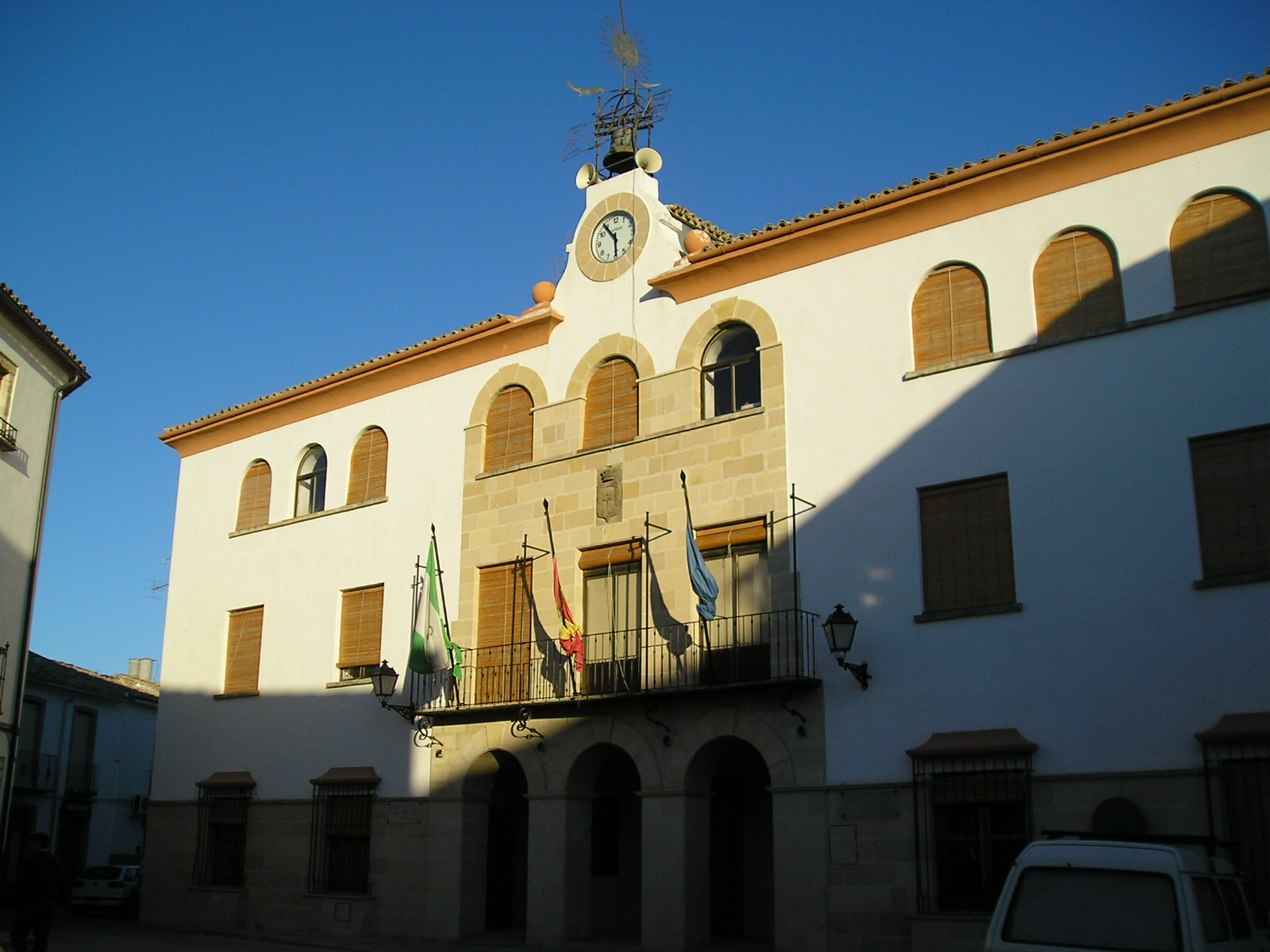
Town Hall of Sabiote

Sabiote is a Spanish town and municipality situated in the northeastern part of La Loma, in the province of Jaén, autonomous community of Andalusia. It borders the municipalities of Úbeda, Torreperogil, Santisteban del Puerto and Navas de San Juan. The river Guadalimar flows through the municipal district, including the reservoir of Giribaile and Olvera. The municipality has a population of 3,886 (INE 2020).

== History ==
Ferdinand III takes the town from the Maurs in 1231. This happened the same year as Cazorla, during the most massive advance in the reconquista, from 1228 to 1248 - and after Idris al-Ma'mun, a new Almohad pretender, decided in 1228 to abandon Spain.

In 1537 Emperor Charles V sold Sabiote to his secretary Francisco de los Cobos for 18,509,751 maravedís. (Note: Cobos also acquired Úbeda, Baeza, El Mármol (11 km N-W of Úbeda) and Santistevan. See Keniston 1960, p. 242.) Cobos was among those who received permission to rebuild the castle - or build another one if he so chose. He built a castle palace symbolising his power and wealth; notable military engineers, architects (Vandelvira) and artists contributed to it. Cobos' castle at Sabiote is the first castle in Spain to be built with a bastion, dated 1543.

== See also ==
- List of municipalities in Jaén

== Bibliography ==
- Muñoz-Cobo, Juan (1978). "Sabiote en el siglo XIV (Hornos, tiendas y molinos)" (PDF). Boletín del Instituto de Estudios Giennenses (in Spanish): 91–100.
- Peláez, José A.; García-Tortosa, Francisco J.; Sánchez-Gómez, Mario; Sanz de Galdeano, Carlos; Pérez-Valera, Fernando; Henares-Romero, Jesús (2013). "La serie sísmica de Torreperogil-Sabiote (Jaén) Más de 2000 terremotos localizados en menos de un año". Enseñanza de las Ciencias de la Tierra (in Spanish). 21 (3).
- Ruiz Calvente, Miguel (1994). "La iglesia parroquial de San Pedro Apóstol de Sabiote (Jaén). Proceso productivo, arquitectos y maestros canteros" (PDF). Boletín del Instituto de Estudios Giennenses (in Spanish) (151): 7–73.
- Torres Navarrete, Ginés (1970). "El Comendador de Sabiote, embajador en la Alhambra" (PDF). Boletín del Instituto de Estudios Giennenses (in Spanish) (65): 68–70.
