= Duke of Santisteban del Puerto =

Spanish dukedom

Dukedom of Santisteban del Puerto
- Creation date: 1738
- Created by: Philip V
- Peerage: Peerage of Spain
- First holder: Manuel de Benavides y Aragón, 1st Duke of Santisteban del Puerto
- Present holder: Victoria de Medina y Conradi, 10th Duchess of Santisteban del Puerto

Duke of Santisteban del Puerto (Spanish: Duque de Santisteban del Puerto) is a hereditary title in the Peerage of Spain accompanied by the dignity of Grandee, granted in 1738 by Philip V to Manuel de Benavides, 10th Count of Santisteban del Puerto and Brigadier of the Spanish Army.

The title makes reference to the town of Santisteban del Puerto in Jaén.

The title of Count of Santisteban del Puerto was awarded by King Henry IV of Castile on 21 September 1473 to Diego Sánchez de Benavides while the Grandee of Spain, was awarded to this Francisco IV de Benavides y Dánila, 9th Count by King Charles II of Spain on 8 July 1696.

Moreover, on 20 August 1738 the 10th Count, Francisco IV's son, Manuel de Benavides y Aragon, (1683–1748) would be promoted to 1st Duke of Santisteban del Puerto, by King Philip V of Spain, for his services as a Spanish Army Brigadier in several battles in Italy.

== Counts of Santisteban del Puerto ==
1. Diego Sánchez de Benavides (1473-1478)
2. Men Rodríguez de Benavides y Carrillo (1478-1491)
3. Francisco de Benavides y Pacheco (1491-1519)
4. Diego Sánchez de Benavides (1519-1562)
5. Francisco de Benavides y Mesía Carrillo (1562-1580)
6. Diego de Benavides y de la Cueva (1580-1589)
7. Francisco de Benavides y Dávila (1589-1640)
8. Diego de Benavides y de la Cueva (1640-1666)
9. Francisco de Benavides Dávila y Corella (1666-1716), also Grandee of Spain
10. Manuel de Benavides y Aragon (1716-1748)

== Dukes of Santisteban del Puerto ==
1. Manuel de Benavides y Aragón, 1st Duke of Santisteban del Puerto (1739-1748)
2. Antonio de Benavides y de la Cueva, 2nd Duke of Santisteban del Puerto (1748-1782)
3. Joaquina de Benavides y Pacheco, 3rd Duchess of Santisteban del Puerto (1782-1805)
4. Luis Joaquín Fernández de Córdoba y Benavides, 4th Duke of Santisteban del Puerto (1805-1840)
5. Luis Tomás Fernández de Córdoba y Ponce de León, 5th Duke of Santisteban del Puerto (1840-1873)
6. Luis María Fernández de Córdoba y Pérez de Barradas, 6th Duke of Santisteban del Puerto (1873-1879)
7. Luis Jesús Fernández de Córdoba y Salabert, 7th Duke of Santisteban del Puerto (1880-1956)
8. Victoria Eugenia Fernández de Córdoba, 8th Duchess of Santisteban del Puerto (1956-1969)
9. Luis de Medina y Fernández de Córdoba, 9th Duke of Santisteban del Puerto (1969-2011)
10. Victoria de Medina y Conradi, 10th Duchess of Santisteban del Puerto (2011-)

== See also ==
- List of dukes in the peerage of Spain
- List of current grandees of Spain

== Bibliography ==
- Hidalgos de España, Real Asociación de (2018). Elenco de Grandezas y Títulos Nobiliarios Españoles. Ediciones Hidalguía. ISBN 978-84-94841-02-6.
