= José de Saavedra, 2nd Marquess of Viana =

The Most Excellent The Marquess of Viana GE
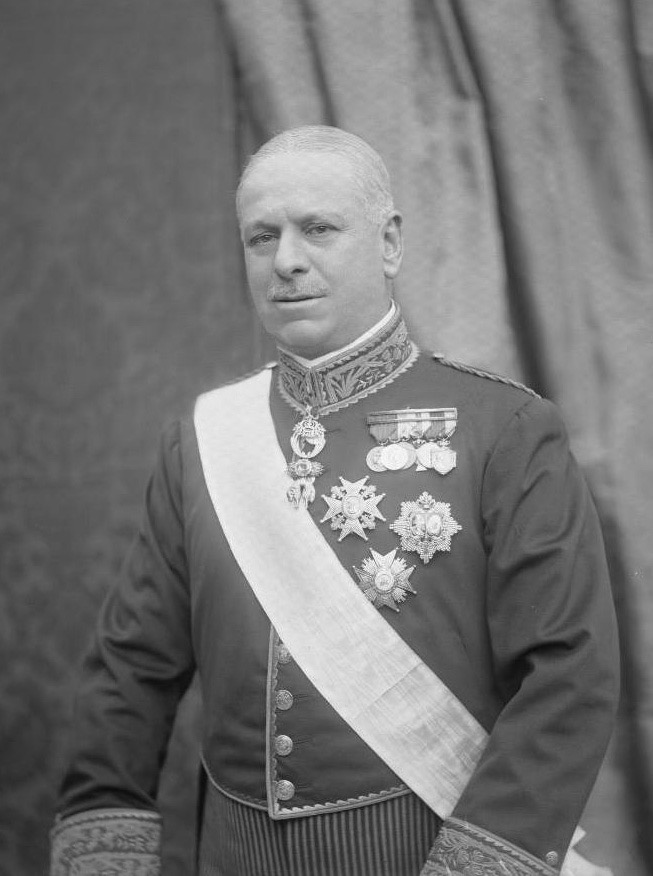
- Portrait of Viana, c. 1926
- Born: 4 April 1870; Madrid, Spain
- Died: 5 April 1927 (aged 57); Madrid, Spain
- Spouse(s): Mencía Collado y del Alcázar, 10th Marchioness of Valle de la Paloma (m. 1896)
- Children: 3
- Parents: Fausto de Saavedra y Cueto, 1st Count of Urbasa (father); Fernanda Salamanca y García (mother)

José de Saavedra y Salamanca, 2nd Marquess of Viana, GE (4 April 1870 – 5 April 1927) was a Spanish peer, courtier and hunter.

A prominent figure in the court of Alfonso XIII, he held important posts such as gentilhombre Grande de España from 1902, caballerizo mayor from 1906 and was a senator in his own right from 1905 to 1923. He was famed for his hunting expertise, being the organiser and utmost authority of the royal hunts. His extraordinarily close relationship with the king, who regarded him in great favour, would be heavily controversial; the Queen and a sector of society accused him of providing and fostering the king's infidelities.

== Early life ==
Viana was born in Madrid into an aristocratic family, whose parents were Fausto de Saavedra y Cueto, 1st Count of Urbasa, and Fernanda de Salamanca y García, as well as being the grandson of the illustrious writer the 3rd Duke of Rivas, who held high public offices. He was also a grandnephew of the immensely wealthy magnate and politician, the 1st Marquess of Salamanca.

His mother died when he was seven years old, and his father only lived three more years. Being orphaned in 1880, he was left in the care of his grandmother, the widowed Duchess of Rivas, and when she died in 1885, his uncle Teobaldo de Saavedra y Cueto, 1st Marquess of Viana, took care of his education. His uncle and guardian was married to Carmen Pérez de Barradas, who had inherited a large fortune from her first husband. The Marquesses of Viana had no children, and they poured their love into young José, whom they would designate as heir to his estate and his successor in said title.

His school years were spent at the Colegio de San Luis Gonzaga, in El Puerto de Santa María, and in 1885 he entered the Artillery Academy of Segovia, where he obtained the office of lieutenant five years later. He would eventually attain the employment of lieutenant colonel.

== At the royal court ==
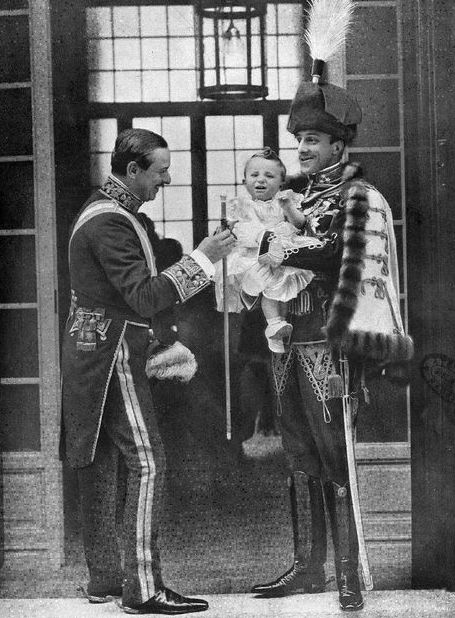
Viana (left) with Infante Jaime and Alfonso XIII, 1909

In 1901 he was a professor at the Carabanchel shooting school, and there he met the young king Alfonso XIII, beginning an intense friendship between the two that would last until the death of the Marquess. In 1902 he began to serve in the Palace as a gentilhombre Grande de España con ejercicio y servidumbre, just a few days before accompanying the monarch as he swore before the Cortes (on May 17 of that year, when he was proclaimed of legal age in advance). In addition, he was one of those chosen for the trip to bring his fiancée, Princess Victoria Eugenie of Battenberg, to Spain.

Viana was a senator in his own right since 1905. The following year, after the Royal House was reorganized due to the King's marriage and taking advantage of the royal wedding between Alfonso and Victoria Eugenia, the monarch appointed the Marquess of Viana caballerizo mayor (also montero mayor), replacing the 7th Marquess of la Mina,

In such a condition, he would organize the King's trips outside the palace and his hunting parties in the royal hunting grounds (Monte de El Pardo, Valsaín, Boca del Asno, the Mudela Encomienda, Doñana, Saja etc.). He would also accompany the monarch on hunts at private estates throughout Spain (Rincón Alto in Moratalla, owned by him, El Castañar, owned by the Count of Mayalde, Malpica, owned by the Duke of Arión or Ventosilla, owned by the Duke of Santoña) or abroad (for instance, Sutton Surrey in England). He would also be an enthusiastic polo player who would contribute to the spread of this sport in the country by organizing, as a groom, the tournaments at the Palacio de la Magdalena and, in particular, a famous annual championship at his estate in Moratalla.

The work of "Pepe Viana" was not only that of a faithful employee of the Royal House. His status as a friend and confidant made him the leader of the clique of friends of Alfonso XIII, which also included the Marquess of la Vega Inclán, Enrique Careaga, the Duke of Alba, José Quiñones de León or the Duke of Infantado. The monarch, his family and his court would visit Viana's Moratalla palace on twelve occasions between 1908 and 1927 to hunt or play polo. He organized a private trip for the King to the Deauville horse races in August 1922, which was strongly criticized as it took place shortly after the Disaster of Annual, at a time of great political instability.

In 1925, upon the death of the 8th Marquess of la Torrecilla, Alfonso XIII expressed his very close trust and friendship in him by naming him "Jefe Superior de Palacio" and sommelier de corps. In 1926, the monarch granted him the collars of the Order of the Golden Fleece and the Order of Charles III.

=== Death ===
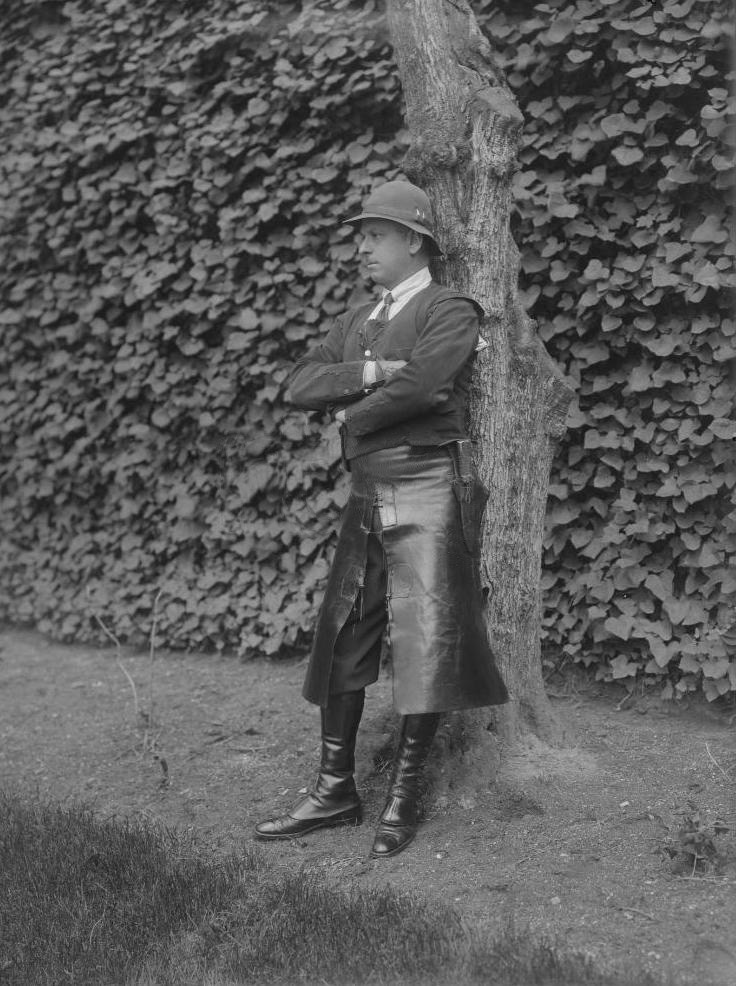
Photographed by Franzen in montería attire, c. 1920

Viana's relationship with queen Victoria Eugenie came to be described as enmity, because she considered the Marquess a provider of infidelities towards her husband the King, while the Marquess blamed her for bringing Haemophilia to the Spanish royal family, due to her ancestry stemming from Queen Victoria. In April 1927, there would be a fierce in-person discussion between the two, in which the queen accused Viana of seeking a royal divorce. This immediately caused an indisposition in him that killed him later the following day, on April 5, 1927. The newspapers of the time attributed the death of the aristocrat to a serious Uremia attack. His funeral enjoyed great resonance in the press and demonstrated the power and influence that the Marquess of Viana had, with Infante Alfonso, the Government in its entirety with Primo de Rivera, as well as the heads of the Palace attending the event. The King and the Prince of Asturias went out to the balcony of the Royal Palace when the procession passed in front of it towards the Cemetery of San Isidro.

== Issue ==
He married Mencía Collado y del Alcázar, 10th Marchioness of Valle de la Paloma, daughter of the 2nd Marquess of Laguna and the 9th Countess of Montalvo, in 1896 in Madrid. They had three children:

- María del Carmen de Saavedra y Collado, 13th Marchioness of Villaviciosa (1899-1967)
- Leonor de Saavedra y Collado, Countess of Torrehermosa (1901-1955)
- Fausto de Saavedra y Collado, 7th Duke of la Roca (1902-1980)

== Titles ==
- 2nd Marquess of Viana (GE)
- 2nd Count of Urbasa

== Heraldry ==
Heraldry of José de Saavedra

Coat of Arms as Marquess of Viana (1900-1927)

== Bibliography ==
- Priego, Count of (2017). Cazadores Españoles del Siglo XX. Turner Publicaciones. ISBN 978-84-16714-29-2.
