= Francisco de Benavides =

Spanish noble

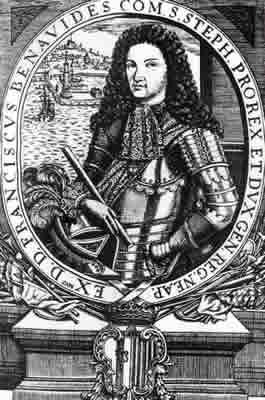
Francisco IV de Benavides y Dávila, viceroy of Naples

Francisco IV de Benavides y Dávila, (1 November 1640, Madrid – 22 August 1716), 9th Count of Santisteban del Puerto was a Spanish noble and Viceroy of Sardinia (1675-1677), Sicily (1678–1687) and Naples (1687–1696).

== Biography ==
He was the second son of Diego de Benavides, 8th Count of Santisteban (1607–1666) and Viceroy of Peru. His mother was Diego's first wife, Antonia Dávila y Corella, VII Marquise de las Navas, X Countess of Cocentaina

Having inherited the title of Count from his father in 1666, when the Guard's regiment was formed after the fall of Juan Everardo Nithard, he was one of the young nobles who obtained one of its captaincies. Later, he was captain general of the coast of Granada (1671), Viceroy of Sardinia (from the end of 1675 until January 1678), Sicily (from January 1679 to January 1688) and Naples (1688-1696). In total, he spent more than twenty years in a row in the three Viceroyalties of southern Italy.

He was appointed Viceroy of Sicily just after the failed Messina revolt, and was ordered to apply severe punishment to the rebellious city.

=== Marriage and Children ===
He married Francisca Josefa de Aragón y Sandoval, (1647–1697), daughter of the VI Duke of Segorbe and had 17 children, including :

- Diego, III Marqués de Solera (1663 - 1693), killed in the Battle of Marseille
- Luis Francisco, IV Marqués de Solera (1665 - 1706), Viceroy of Navarre
- Manuel (1683–1748), 1st Duke of Santisteban del Puerto

== Some references ==
- Real Academia de la Historia
- "Francisca Josefa de Aragón" in Fundacion Medinaceli
- "Francisco de Benavides Dávila y Corella" in Fundacion Medinaceli

Government offices
Preceded by Melchor Cisternes de Oblite	Viceroy of Sardinia; 1675–1677	Succeeded by Melchor Cisternes de Oblite
Preceded by Vicente de Gonzaga y Doria	Viceroy of Sicily; 1678–1687	Succeeded by Juan Francisco Pacheco y Téllez-Girón
Preceded by Gaspar Méndez de Haro, 7th Marquis of Carpio	Viceroy of Naples; 1687–1696	Succeeded by Luis Francisco de la Cerda
