= Marquess of Viana (1875) =

Spanish nobility title

Marquessate of Viana
- Creation date: 2 July 1875
- Created by: Alfonso XII
- Peerage: Peerage of Spain
- First holder: Teobaldo de Saavedra y Cueto, 1st Marquess of Viana
- Present holder: Jacobo Fitz-James Stuart y Gómez, 4th Marquess of Viana

Marquess of Viana (Spanish: Marqués de Viana) is a hereditary title in the Peerage of Spain accompanied by the dignity of Grandee, granted in 1875 by Alfonso XII to Teobaldo de Saavedra, son of the 3rd Duke of Rivas and strong proponent of the Bourbon Restoration. The name refers to the small town of Viana de Mondéjar, in Trillo, Guadalajara.

The 2nd Marquess held important positions in the Royal Household as he was Sommelier de Corps, Caballerizo mayor and Montero Mayor, as well as a close friend of Alfonso XIII. There was also a manifest enmity between him and the queen, since she accused him of promoting the infidelities of the king, while Viana despised her for having introduced Haemophilia in the royal family.

== Marquesses of Viana (1875) ==
- Teobaldo de Saavedra y Cueto, 1st Marquess of Viana (1839-1898)
- José de Saavedra y Salamanca, 2nd Marquess of Viana (1870-1927), son of Fausto de Saavedra y Cueto, brother of the 1st Marquess
- Fausto de Saavedra y Collado, 3rd Marquess of Viana (1902-1980), eldest son of the 2nd Marquess
- Jacobo Fitz-James Stuart y Gómez, 4th Marquess of Viana (b. 1947), eldest son of the 19th Duke of Peñaranda, grandchild of the 2nd Marquess

== See also ==
- List of current grandees of Spain

== Bibliography ==
- Hidalgos de España, Real Asociación de (2018). Elenco de Grandezas y Títulos Nobiliarios Españoles. Ediciones Hidalguía. ISBN 978-84-94841-02-6.
