= Count of Altamira =

Hereditary title in the Peerage of Spain

Countship of Altamira
- Creation date: 13 March 1455
- Created by: Henry IV
- Peerage: Peerage of Spain
- First holder: Lope Sánchez de Ulloa y Moscoso, 1st Count of Altamira
- Present holder: Gonzalo Barón y Gavito, 19th Count of Altamira
- Former seat: Palace of Altamira

Count of Altamira (Spanish: Conde de Altamira) is a hereditary title in the Peerage of Spain, accompanied by the dignity of Grandee and granted in 1455 by Henry IV to Lope Sánchez de Ulloa, Lord of the Fortress of Altamira.

The title makes reference to the Fortress of Altamira, near Brión, La Coruña.

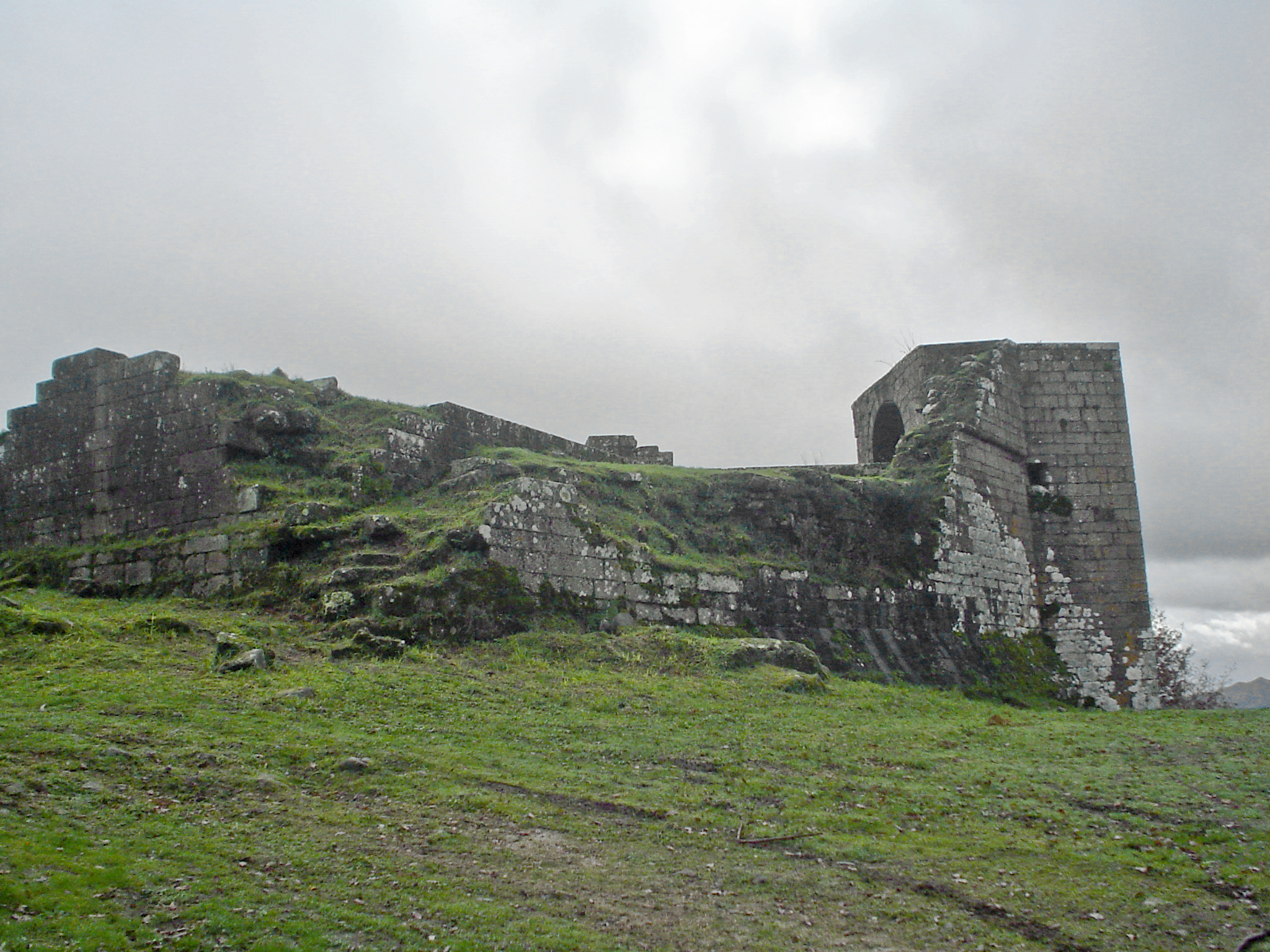
Remains of the Fortress of Altamira in Brión

== Counts of Altamira (1455) ==
- Lope Sánchez de Ulloa y Moscoso, 1st Count of Altamira
- Rodrigo de Moscoso y Osorio, 2nd Count of Altamira
- Lope de Moscoso Osorio y Andrade, 3rd Count of Altamira
- Rodrigo de Moscoso Osorio y Álvarez de Toledo, 4th Count of Altamira
- Lope de Moscoso Osorio y Castro, 5th Count of Altamira
- Gaspar de Moscoso Osorio y Sandoval, 6th Count of Altamira
- Luis Hurtado de Mendoza, 7th Count of Altamira
- Antonio Gaspar de Moscoso Osorio y Aragón, 8th Count of Altamira
- Ventura Osorio de Moscoso y Guzmán, 9th Count of Altamira
- Ventura Osorio de Moscoso y Fernández de Córdoba, 10th Count of Altamira
- Vicente Joaquín Osorio de Moscoso y Guzmán, 11th Count of Altamira
- Vicente Isabel Osorio de Moscoso y Álvarez de Toledo, 12th Count of Altamira
- Vicente Pío Osorio de Moscoso y Ponce de León, 13th Count of Altamira
- José María Osorio de Moscoso y Carvajal, 14th Count of Altamira
- Francisco de Asís Osorio de Moscoso y de Borbón, 15th Count of Altamira
- Francisco de Asís Osorio de Moscoso y Jordán de Urríes, 16th Count of Altamira
- Gerardo Osorio de Moscoso y Reynoso, 17th Count of Altamira
- Leopoldo Barón y Osorio de Moscoso, 18th Count of Altamira
- Gonzalo Barón y Gavito, 19th Count of Altamira

== See also ==
- List of current grandees of Spain
