= Infanta Luisa Teresa of Spain =

Infanta Luisa Teresa
- Duchess of Sessa
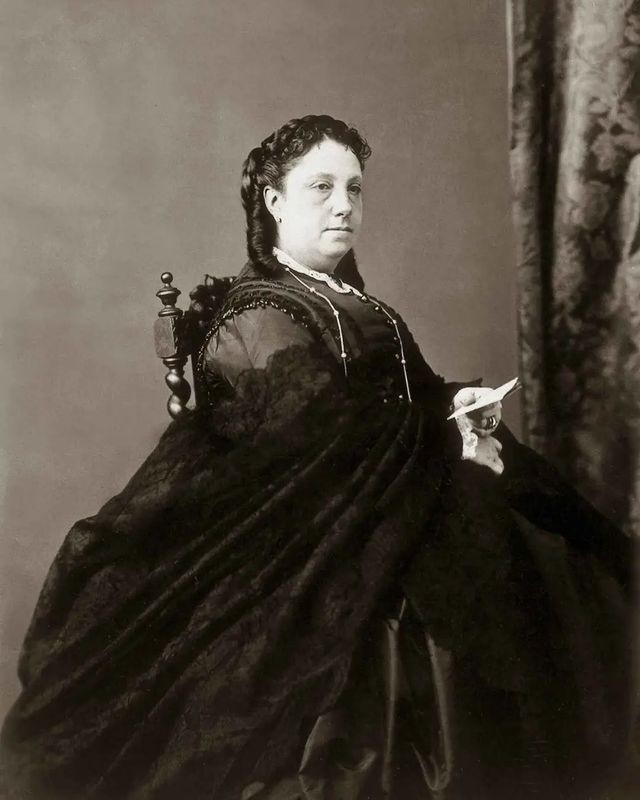
- Photograph of Infanta Luisa, c. 1870
- Born: 11 June 1824; Aranjuez, Madrid, Spain
- Died: 27 December 1900 (aged 76); Madrid, Spain
- Spouse: José María Osorio de Moscoso y Carvajal, 16th Duke of Sessa (m. 1847; died 1881)
- Issue: Francisco de Asís Osorio de Moscoso y Borbón, 17th Duke of Sessa; Luis María Osorio de Moscoso y Borbón, 16th Marquis of Ayamonte; María Cristina de Bauffremont y Osorio de Moscoso, 9th Duchess of Atrisco
- House: Bourbon
- Father: Infante Francisco de Paula of Spain
- Mother: Princess Luisa Carlotta of the Two Sicilies

Infanta Luisa Teresa of Spain (11 June 1824 – 27 December 1900) was a Spanish infanta.

== Biography ==
She was the daughter of Infante Francisco de Paula of Spain, the third surviving son of King Charles IV of Spain, and Princess Luisa Carlotta of the Two Sicilies, daughter of King Francis I of the Two Sicilies.

Instead of marrying a prince of a European royal house, she married the Spanish aristocrat Don José María Osorio de Moscoso y Carvajal, Duke of Sessa in 1847. She was an intimate friend and favorite of her cousin and sister-in-law Queen Isabella II, who allowed her marriage despite the unprecedented unequal rank.

The couple supported the monarchy after the Revolution of 1868, sending financial aid to the dethroned Crown, considerably reducing their income and even having to sell some properties, such as the Altamira Palace, as well as the Villamanrique Palace, in the town of the same name, in addition to others. This did not prevent the Infanta from leading a high standard of living, traveling regularly between Madrid, Paris and Biarritz.

The Infanta Luisa Teresa, who kept her title of Infanta of Spain even after getting married, belonged to the Order of Queen Maria Luisa. She was widowed in 1881 and died in Madrid on 27 December 1900, when she was 76 years old. She was buried in the Pantheon of Infants in the Monastery of El Escorial.

== Ancestry ==
Ancestors of Infanta Luisa Teresa of Spain

8. Charles III of Spain
4. Charles IV of Spain (= 14)
9. Maria Amalia of Saxony
2. Infante Francisco de Paula of Spain
10. Philip, Duke of Parma
5. Maria Luisa of Parma (= 15)
11. Louise Élisabeth of France
1. Infanta Luisa Teresa of Spain
12. Ferdinand I of the Two Sicilies
6. Francis I of the Two Sicilies
13. Maria Carolina of Austria
3. Princess Luisa Carlotta of the Two Sicilies
14. Charles IV of Spain (= 4)
7. Maria Isabella of Spain
15. Maria Luisa of Parma (= 5)
