= Duke of Arco =

Dukedom of Spain

Dukedom of Arco
- Creation date: 26 April 1715; 311 years ago
- Created by: Philip V
- Peerage: Peerage of Spain
- First holder: Alonso Manrique de Lara y Silva, 1st Duke of Arco
- Present holder: Mercedes Falcó y Anchorena

Duke of Arco (Spanish: Duque del Arco) is a hereditary title in the peerage of Spain, accompanied by the dignity of Grandee and granted in 1715 by Philip V to Alonso Manrique de Lara, 4th Count of Montehermoso, knight of the Order of the Golden Fleece and his caballerizo mayor for two periods, 1721–1724 and 1724–1737.

The title makes reference to the small village of Arco in Cañaveral, province of Cáceres, where the grantee held a lordship.

== Succession ==
As with other Spanish noble titles, the dukedom of Arco descended according to cognatic primogeniture, meaning that females could inherit the title if they had no brothers (or if their brothers had no issue), such as in the 7th Duchess's case. The rules were relaxed in 2006, since when the eldest child (regardless of gender) can automatically succeed to noble family titles.

The 7th Duchess married Fernando de Soto y Colón de Carvajal (1930-2001), V Count of Puerto Hermoso, X Marquess of Arienzo, and it is expected that their son, Manuel de Soto y Falcó, will succeed to his mother's dukedom.

== Notable figures ==
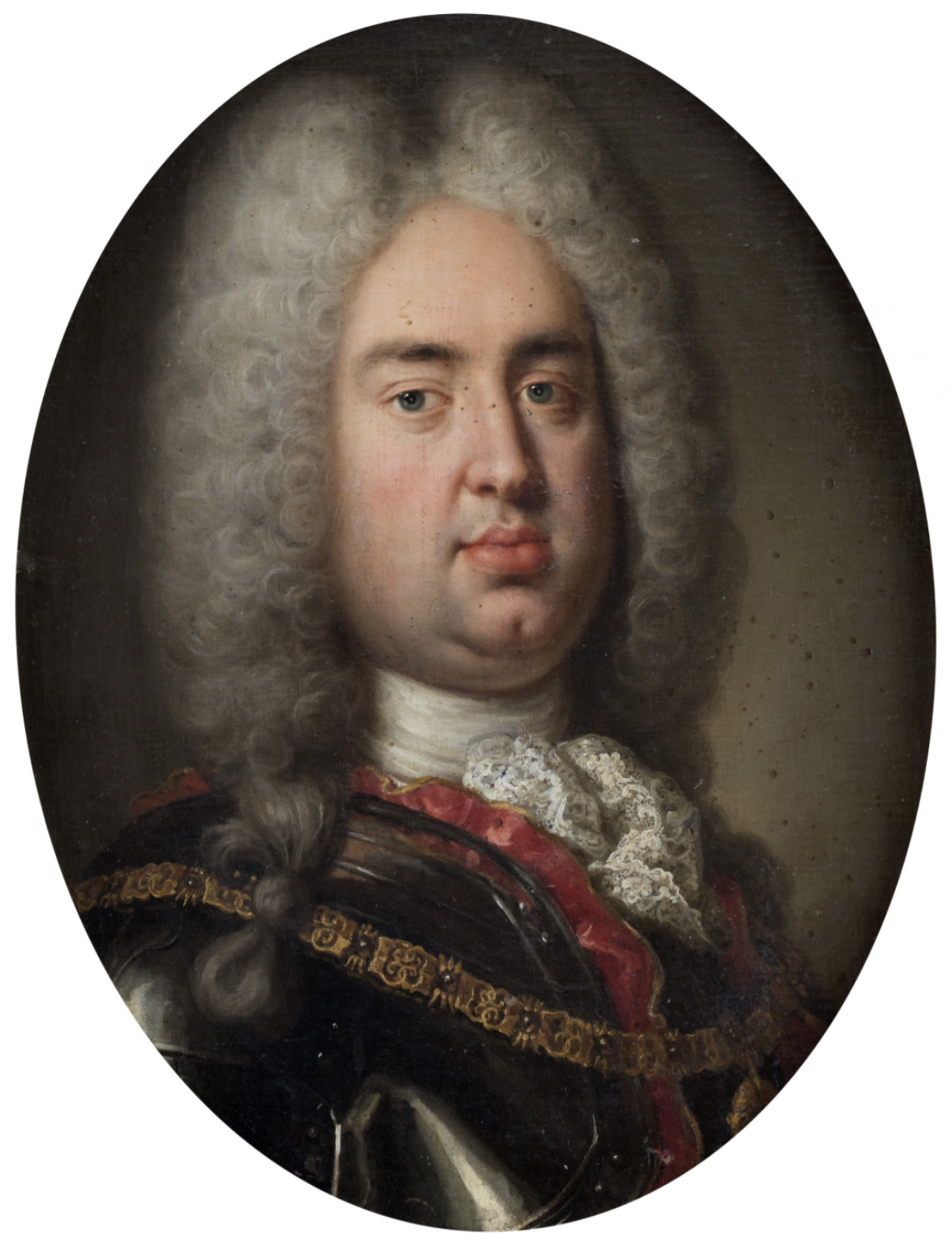
Portrait of the 1st Duke by Antonio David

Historical accounts mentioned some notable personages who held the title. For instance, there was the very first duke Don Alonso Manrique, who also held the positions caballerizo mayor and "montero mayor" (Master of the Royal Hunt). In 1839, the duke who held this position represented the hacendados (landowners) in a petition to the civil governor of Malaga asking for irrigation reforms.

== List of dukes of Arco ==
	Title holder	Period
Created by Philip V of Spain
I	Alonso Manrique de Lara y Silva	1715 – 1737
II	Francisco de Asís Lasso de la Vega y Manrique	1770 – 1805
III	María Vicenta de Solís y Lasso de la Vega	1805 – 1848
IV	María Pilar Osorio y Gutiérrez de los Ríos	1848 – 1917
V	Manuel Falcó y Álvarez de Toledo	1917 – 1951
VI	Manuel Falcó y Anchorena	1951 – 1958
VII	Mercedes Falcó y de Anchorena	1958 – present

== See also ==
- List of dukes in the peerage of Spain
- List of current grandees of Spain

== Bibliography ==
- Hidalgos de España, Real Asociación de (2018). Elenco de Grandezas y Títulos Nobiliarios Españoles. Ediciones Hidalguía. ISBN 978-84-94841-02-6.
