= Antonio Ponce de León, 11th Duke of Arcos =

Spanish peer and army officer (1726–1780)

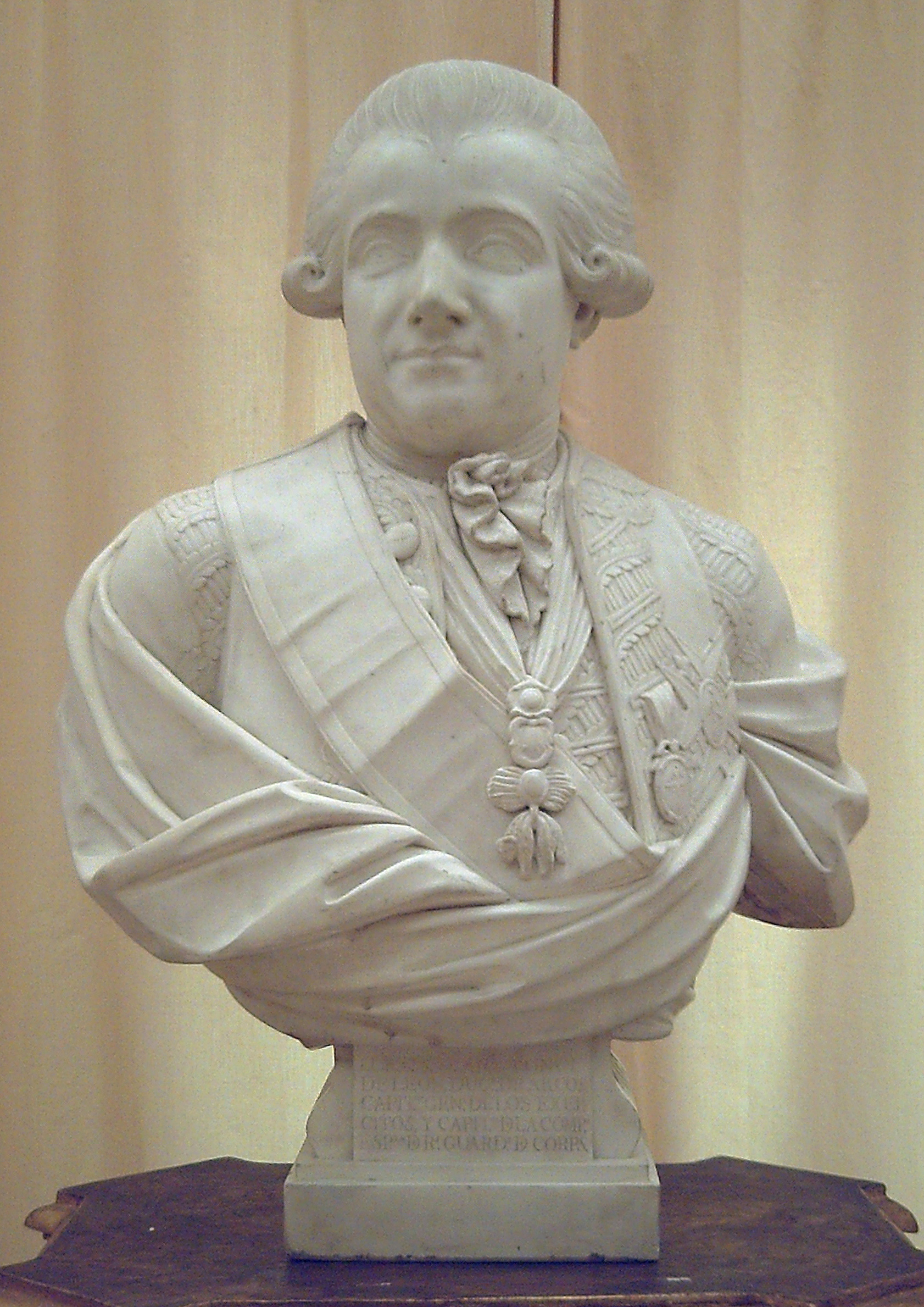
1783 marble bust of the 12th Duke of Arcos, Real Academia de Bellas Artes de San Fernando

Antonio Ponce de León y Spínola, 11th Duke of Arcos, GE (3 October 1726 – 13 December 1780) was a Spanish peer and army officer. The last male representative of the House of Ponce de León, he was known for his extensive wealth. For a period of time, he was the largest individual employer in Western Europe, having over 3,000 servants working for him at one point.

== Biography ==
Born 3 October 1726 in Madrid, he was the youngest son of Joaquín Ponce de León y Lancaster, 7th Duke of Arcos and 10th Duke of Maqueda (amongst other titles) and Ana María Spínola y de la Cerda. Ponce de León was a direct descendant of several junior branches of European royal dynasties: his paternal grandmother, María Guadalupe de Láncaster, 9th Duchess of Maqueda, was a Lancaster, while his mother was the daughter of Felipe Antonio Spínola y Colonna, 4th Marquess of Balbases, of the House of Spinola and Colonna, and Isabel María de la Cerda y Aragón, daughter of the 8th Duke of Medinaceli and of Catalina de Aragón, of the House of Aragon.

After serving as an army officer in Italy, he returned to Spain in 1752 and was appointed supernumerary captain of the Spanish Royal Company of Corps Guards. In December 1763, all three of his older brothers had died in battle with no succession, and so Antonio became the 11th Duke of Arcos, the 18th Duke of Nájera, 14th Duke of Maqueda, 15th Marquess of Elche, 15th Marquess of Zahara, 11th Count of Casares and 13th Count of Bailén amongst other titles. The following year, Charles III awarded him the Order of the Golden Fleece. In 1772 he was appointed Captain General of the Royal Spanish Armies, despite continuing to command the Corps Guards.

On 1 January 1778, he married Mariana de Silva-Bazán y Sarmiento, mother of the famous María Cayetana de Silva, 13th Duchess of Alba, with whom he had no descendants.

With his death on 13 December 1780, the first-born male line of the House of Ponce de León became extinct, and the House of Arcos was incorporated into the House of Benavente, and later to the House of Osuna.

== See also ==
- List of dukes in the peerage of Spain
- Mariano Téllez-Girón
- Vicente Pío Osorio de Moscoso

Spanish nobility
Preceded by Francisco Ponce de León	Duke of Arcos; 1763–1780	Succeeded by María Josefa Pimentel
