= Vicente Osorio de Moscoso, 13th Count of Altamira =

Spanish peer, head of the House of Osorio

The Most Excellent The Count of Altamira GE OM LH
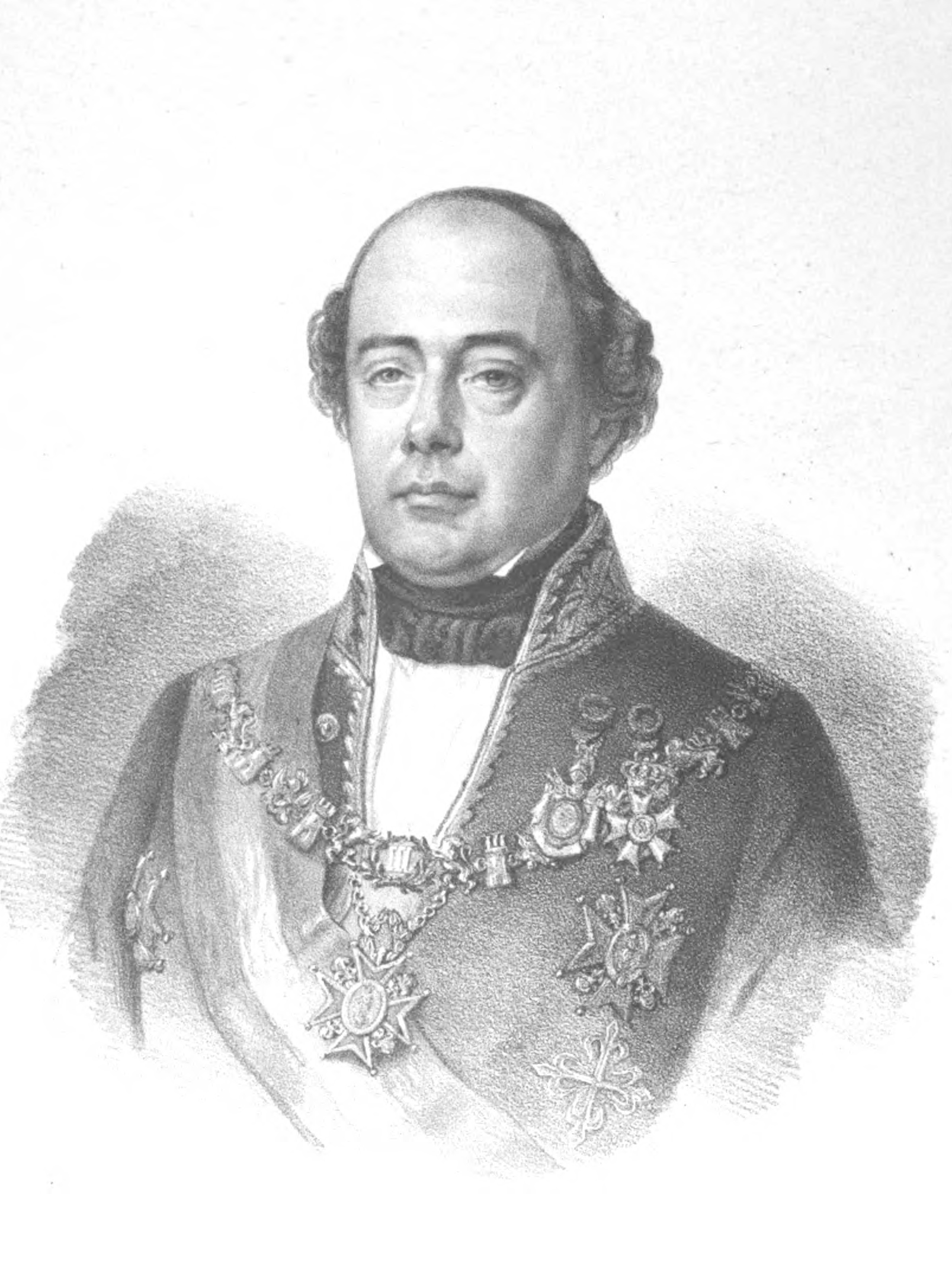
- Portrayed in a lithography, c. 1853

Personal details
- Born: Vicente Pío Osorio de Moscoso y Ponce de León; 22 July 1801 Madrid, Spain
- Died: February 22, 1864 (aged 62) Madrid, Spain
- Spouse: María Luisa Carvajal y Queralt
- Children: José María Osorio de Moscoso y Carvajal, 16th Duke of Sessa; María Cristina Osorio de Moscoso y Carvajal; María Eulalia Osorio de Moscoso y Carvajal; María Rosalía Osorio de Moscoso y Carvajal
- Parents: Vicente Isabel Osorio de Moscoso y Álvarez de Toledo, 12th Count of Altamira (father); María del Carmen Ponce de León y Carvajal, 5th Duchess of Montemar (mother)

Vicente Pío Osorio de Moscoso y Ponce de León, 13th Count of Altamira, GE, OM, LH (22 July 1801 – 22 February 1864), was a Spanish peer and head of the House of Osorio. He held 109 titles of nobility, mostly in the peerage of Spain, and was fourteen times a Grandee, making him the most titled person in the history of the world.

== Biography ==
=== Family origins ===
Vicente Pío was born 22 July 1801, son of Vicente Isabel Osorio de Moscoso y Álvarez de Toledo, who was the 12th Count of Altamira and many other titles. His mother was María del Carmen Ponce de León y Carvajal, 5th Duchess of Montemar. Through the deaths with no descendants of several of the main peers in Spain at the time, Osorio's family inherited many of the grandest titles in the country as the closest descendants.

=== Early years ===
From a young age, he entered the body of pages of the court, being orphaned of his mother at the age of 12. In 1821, when he was only twenty, he married María Luisa Carvajal y Queralt (1804-1843), daughter of José Miguel de Carvajal, 2nd Duke of San Carlos, in the Bordeaux Cathedral. They had 3 daughters and one son, his successor José María Osorio de Moscoso y Carvajal.

His father, a moderate liberal, had served in the Royal Household of Spain, as Ferdinand VII's senior groom during the Liberal Triennium, for which, in 1823, he had been retaliated, the king removing him from that position and withdrawing the key of Gentilhombre Grande de España con ejercicio y servidumbre. Despite the repeated efforts of his son, the king never rehabilitated him. In 1837 he died, and Vicente Pío inherited the numerous paternal titles from him.

=== Later years ===
In 1842, the Law of Confiscation of Mayorazgos that made him lose the territories of his large estates (Osorio, Moscoso, Cárdenas, Fernández de Córdoba, Guzmán, etc.), forced him to sell and mortgage a large part of his fincas. A widower in 1843, he immediately became close to Isabella II and his eldest son and heir, José María, married into the royal family in 1847 with Infanta Luisa Teresa.

In 1843, he became Senator for the Province of León along with the Marquess of San Isidro, and in 1845, Life Senator. From 1849 to 1850, he was vice-president of the Senate of Spain.

Isabella II appointed him, in 1854, her Caballerizo mayor and, just two years later, her Sumiller de Corps, who, as head of the Royal Chamber, implied enormous confidence from the queen. In fact, he would not hesitate to marry his daughter Rosalía, in 1859, to José María Ruiz de Arana, a well-known lover of the queen. He was sommelier until his death, which occurred in Madrid in February 1864.
After his death on 22 February 1864, a testamentary commission was established to guarantee the distribution of his substantial inheritance and titles, headed by José Genaro Villanova as executor.

== Titles held ==
=== Dukedoms ===
- 17th Duke of Maqueda (GE)
- 13th Duke of Baena (GE)
- 15th Duke of Sessa (GE)
- 14th Duke of Soma (GE)
- 11th Duke of Sanlúcar la Mayor (GE)
- 9th Duke of Medina de las Torres (GE)
- 8th Duke of Atrisco (GE)
- 6th Duke of Montemar (GE)
- 14th Duke of Terranova (GE) - held unofficially due to extinction
- 14th Duke of Santángelo (GE) - held unofficially due to extinction
- 14th Duke of Andría (GE) - held unofficially due to extinction

=== Marquessates ===
- 18th Marquess of Astorga (GE)
- 9th Marquess of Castromonte (GE)
- 9th Marquess of Leganés (GE)
- 12th Marquess of Velada (GE)
- 12th Marquess of Almazán
- 13th Marquess of Poza
- 9th Marquess of Mairena
- 8th Marquess of Morata de la Vega
- 9th Marquess of Monasterio
- 15th Marquess of Ayamonte
- 10th Marquess of Villamanrique
- 10th Marquess of Villa de San Román
- 17th Marquess of Elche
- 12th Marquess of Montemayor
- 11th Marquess of Águila

=== Countships ===
- 13th Count of Altamira (GE)
- 14th Count of Cabra (GE)
- 19th Count of Palamós
- 15th Count of Trivento
- 15th Countof Avellino
- 14th Count of Oliveto
- 17th Count of Monteagudo de Mendoza
- 12th Count of Losada
- 10th Count of Arzacóllar
- 14th Count of Trastámara
- 17th Count of Santa María de Ortigueira
- 12th Count of Lodosa
- 11th Count of Saltés
- 20th Count of Nieva
- 6th Count of Garcíez
- 5th Count of Valhermoso
- ? Count of Cantillana

=== Viscountcies ===
- 14th Viscount of Iznájar

=== Baronies ===
- 24th Baron of Bellpuig
- 15th Baron of Calonge
- 16th Baron Liñola

=== Other titles ===
He held 4 princely titles from the peerage of the Kingdom of the Two Sicilies, namely the principalities of Maratea, Venosa, Jaffa and Aracena. He was also Guarda Mayor de Castilla, Alférez mayor del pendón de la Divisa del rey, Grand Admiral of Naples, Grand Chancellor of Italy and of the Tax Council, Chancellor of the Real Audiencia of the Indies and adelantado mayor of the Kingdom of Granada.

== See also ==
- List of dukes in the peerage of Spain
- List of current grandees of Spain
- Mariano Téllez-Girón
- Antonio Ponce de León
