= Palace of Altamira (Madrid) =

- Palacio de Altamira (Spanish)
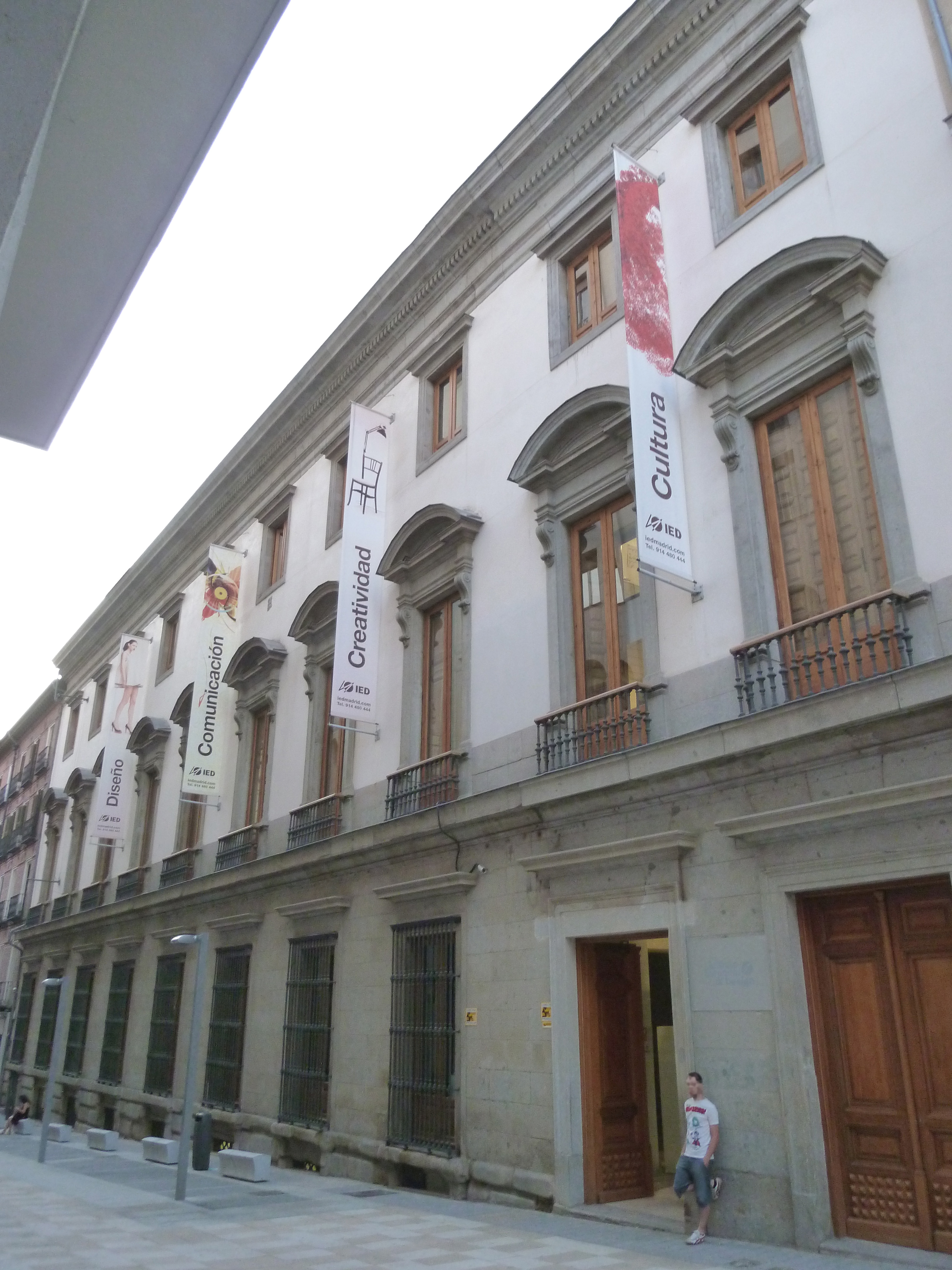

- Location within Spain
- 40.421675°N 3.707197°W
- Location: Madrid, Spain

Spanish Cultural Heritage
- Official name: Palacio de Altamira
- Type: Non-movable
- Criteria: Monument
- Designated: 1977
- Reference no.: RI-51-0004248

The Palace of Altamira (Spanish: Palacio de Altamira), abbreviated Altamira Palace, is a palace located at number 8 Calle de la Flor Alta, near the Gran Via in Madrid, Spain. It was declared Bien de Interés Cultural (a national monument) in 1977. It was designed by the architect, Ventura Rodríguez, in 1772, for the Counts of Altamira.

== Location ==
The Palace of Altamira was a building of great magnitude that occupied an entire block, up to the Calle de San Bernardo (or Calle Ancha de San Bernardo as it was then called to distinguish it from the Calle Angosta de San Bernardo, now called Calle de la Aduana). This area was the axis around which the aristocratic residences of that time were grouped, until the next century when it was replaced by the Castellana. In addition to the aforementioned San Bernardo and Flor Alta, the palace had façades facing the Libreros and Marques de Leganes streets.

== Construction ==
Construction did not begin until 1788, but at the celebrations of the coronation of Charles IV in September of the following year a representation of what the building would be like once work was completed was shown to him. On seeing the magnificence of what was presented he feared it could overshadow his own palace, also located at not too great a distance. This made him start to hinder its progress, with the result that, finally, from the original project only one of the bays was built, with a total area of 1344 square meters. Other versions say that these changes were simply of a financial nature.

The project included a monumental staircase, two courtyards, one with garden beds of French style, and a large oval floor chapel, all of which failed to materialize.

== Remodelling ==
In 1887 the architect Mariano Belmas directed works that were undertaken to aesthetically standardize the building, especially an important part of the façade which had been left unfinished. By the twentieth century, the interior had already been compartmentalized to accommodate office use. These offices were later closed, remaining that way for over a decade and becoming severely deteriorated. Finally, after a complex rehabilitation, directed by Gabriel Allende Gil de Viedma, it has been housing, since October 2005, the seat of the Istituto Europeo di Design.

== Proprietor ==
A famous owner of this palace was Vicente Osorio de Moscoso y Ponce de León (1801-1864). He was Grandee of Spain, Count of Altamira, Duke of Sessa and Montemar, Marquess of Astorga, Leganes, Ayamonte and San Román, Count of Cabra, Viscount of Iznajar, among others. He kept his large collection of paintings in the palace, one of the first in Spain.

Moscoso y Ponce de Leon's will, made on 7 August 1861, reflects the works of art that he owned. He left several paintings by Goya (now in the Royal Palace of Madrid), Federico Madrazo and several others to Queen Isabella II, cousin of the wife of his eldest son, José María Osorio de Moscoso y Carvajal, the Infanta Luisa Teresa de Borbón y Borbón Dos Sicilias (daughter of Infante Francisco de Paula de Borbón). In his will is found the large collections he had of Goya, Rubens, Velazquez, the Neapolitan Andrea Vaccaro and the portrait of Gonzalo Fernández de Córdoba, the Great Captain, owned by the Casa de Cabra.
