= Count of Maceda =

Countship of Maceda
- Creation date: 21 September 1654
- Created by: Philip IV
- Peerage: Peerage of Spain
- First holder: Alonso de Lanzós Novoa y Andrade, 1st Count of Maceda
- Present holder: Inés Pan de Soraluce y Casani, 18th Countess of Maceda

Count of Maceda (Spanish: Conde de Maceda) is a hereditary title in the Peerage of Spain, accompanied by the dignity of Grandee and granted in 1654 by Philip IV to Alonso de Lanzós, Lord of Maceda and knight of the Order of Santiago.

The name makes reference to the town of Maceda in Galicia, Spain, where the 1st count held a fiefdom.

== Counts of Maceda ==
1. Alonso de Lanzós Novoa y Andrade, 1st Count of Maceda
2. Bernardino de Lanzós Novoa y Andrade, 2nd Count of Maceda
3. Antonio de Lanzós Novoa y Andrade, 3rd Count of Maceda
4. José Benito de Lanzós Novoa y Sotomayor, 4th Count of Maceda
5. Antonio Pedro Nolasco de Lanzós y Taboada, 5th Count of Maceda
6. Baltasar de Lanzós y Taboada, 6th Count of Maceda
7. Francisco Javier de Lanzós y Taboada, 7th Count of Maceda
8. María de la Concepcion de Lanzós y Osorio, 8th Countess of Maceda
9. Gonzalo Manuel de Lanzós Deza y Lanzós, 9th Count of Maceda
10. Baltasar Pardo de Figueroa y Lanzós, 10th Count of Maceda
11. Ramona Pardo de Figueroa y Sarmiento, 11th Countess of Maceda
12. Francico Javier de Losada y Pardo de Figueroa, 12th Count of Maceda
13. José de Losada y Miranda, 13th Count of Maceda
14. Baltasar de Losada y Miranda, 14th Count of Maceda
15. Baltasar de Losada y Torres, 15th Count of Maceda
16. Beatriz Losada y Ozores, 16th Countess of Maceda
17. Lucía Casani y Losada, 17th Countess of Maceda
18. Inés Pan de Soraluce y Casani, 18th Countess of Maceda

== See also ==
- List of current grandees of Spain
