= Duke of Sanlúcar la Mayor =

Dukedom of Spain

Dukedom of Sanlúcar la Mayor
- Creation date: 25 January 1625
- Created by: Philip IV
- Peerage: Peerage of Spain
- First holder: Gaspar de Guzmán y Pimentel, 1st Duke of Sanlúcar la Mayor
- Present holder: María Cristina Ruiz de Arana y Marone-Cinzano, 18th Duchess of Sanlúcar la Mayor

Duke of Sanlúcar la Mayor (Spanish: Duque de Sanlúcar la Mayor) is a hereditary title in the Peerage of Spain, accompanied by the dignity of Grandee and granted in 1625 by Philip IV to Gaspar de Guzmán, 3rd Count of Olivares and royal favourite to the king.

Since the title was granted to the Count of Olivares, the first holder became popularly known as the "Count-Duke of Olivares", by conjunction of the two titles. However, and by Royal Decree in 1882, the Countship of Olivares became officially known as the Countship-Dukedom of Olivares (condado-ducado de Olivares). The Dukedom of Sanlúcar la Mayor remains with the original denomination, and makes reference to the town of Sanlúcar la Mayor in the Province of Seville.

The 17th Duke was son-in-law of Infanta Maria Cristina of Spain, daughter of King Alfonso XIII, descendant of Queen Victoria of the United Kingdom.

== Dukes of Sanlúcar la Mayor (1625) ==
- Gaspar de Guzmán y Pimentel, 1st Duke of Sanlúcar la Mayor
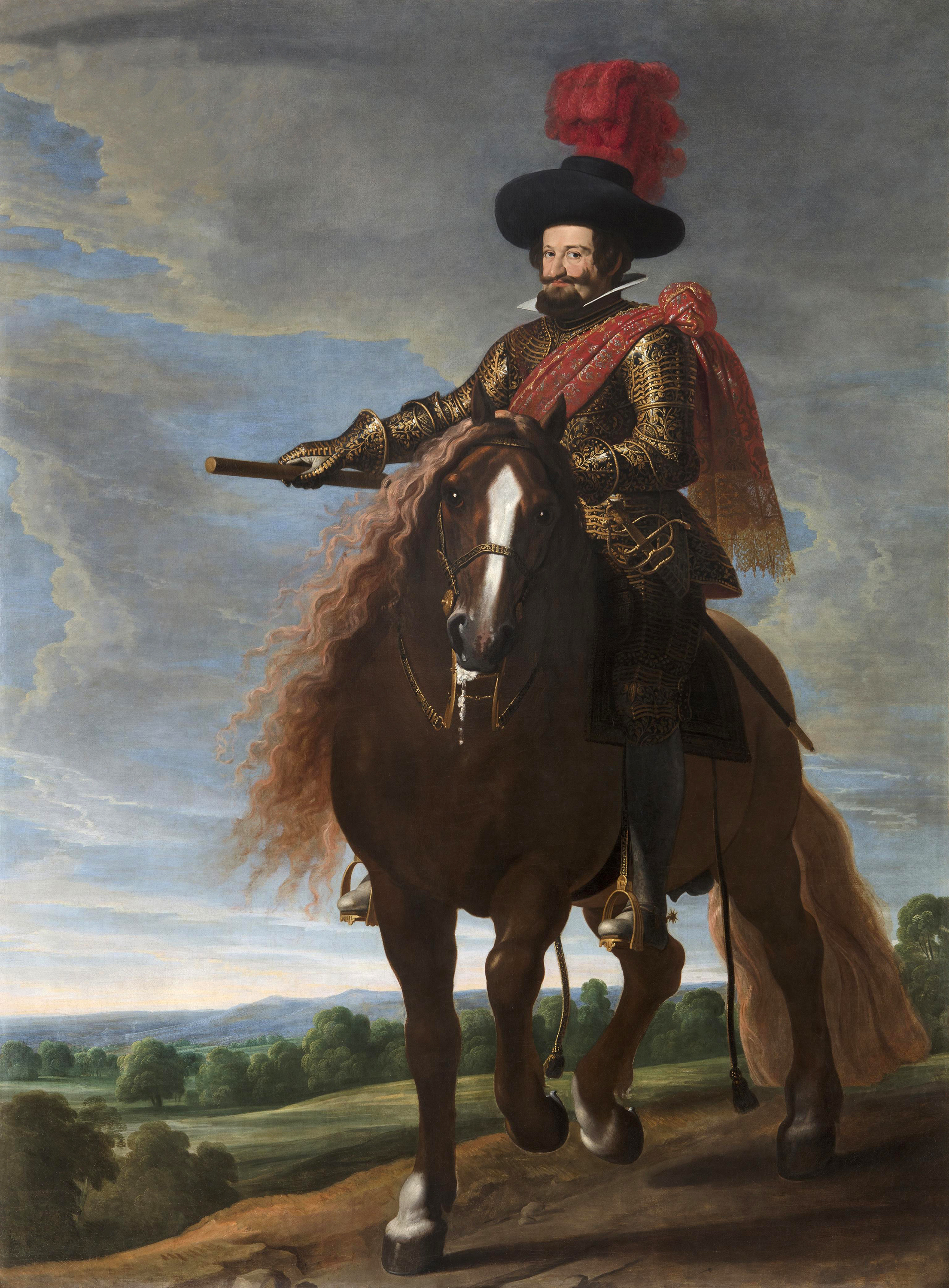
  Equestrian portrait of the 1st Duke by Gaspar de Crayer, c. 1627
  (1625-1645)
- Enrique Felipe de Guzmán y Avecedo, 2nd Duke of Sanlúcar la Mayor (1645-1646)
- Gaspar Felipe de Guzmán y Velasco 3rd Duke of Sanlúcar la Mayor (1646-1648)
- Diego Messía y Felípez de Guzmán, 4th Duke of Sanlúcar la Mayor (1648-1655)
- Gaspar Messía y Spínola, 5th Duke of Sanlúcar la Mayor (1655-1666)
- Diego Francisco Messía y Córdoba, 6th Duke of Sanlúcar la Mayor (1666-1711)
- Antonio Gaspar de Moscoso Osorio y Aragón, 7th Duke of Sanlúcar la Mayor (1711-1725)
- Ventura Antonio de Osorio de Moscoso y Guzmán, 8th Duke of Sanlúcar la Mayor (1725-1734)
- Ventura Osorio de Moscoso y Fernández de Córdoba, 9th Duke of Sanlúcar la Mayor (1734-1776)
- Vicente Joaquín Osorio de Moscoso y Guzmán, 10th Duke of Sanlúcar la Mayor (1776-1816)
- Vicente Isabel Osorio de Moscoso y Álvarez de Toledo, 11th Duke of Sanlúcar la Mayor (1816-1837)
- Vicente Pío Osorio de Moscoso y Ponce de León, 12th Duke of Sanlúcar la Mayor (1837-1848)
- María Cristina Osorio de Moscoso y Carvajal, 13th Duchess of Sanlúcar la Mayor (1849-1898)
- Luis María Ruiz de Arana y Osorio de Moscoso, 14th Duke of Sanlúcar la Mayor (1898-1903)
- Luis María Ruiz de Arana y Martín de Oliva, 15th Duke of Sanlúcar la Mayor (1903-1936)
- José María Ruiz de Arana y Baüer, 16th Duke of Sanlúcar la Mayor (1952-1985)
- José María Ruiz de Arana y Montalvo, 17th Duke of Sanlúcar la Mayor (1990-2000)
- María Cristina Ruiz de Arana y Marone-Cinzano, 18th Duchess of Sanlúcar la Mayor (2000-)

== See also ==
- List of dukes in the peerage of Spain
- List of current grandees of Spain

== Bibliography ==
- Hidalgos de España, Real Asociación de (2018). Elenco de Grandezas y Títulos Nobiliarios Españoles. Ediciones Hidalguía. ISBN 978-84-94841-02-6.
