= Alfonso Manrique de Lara, 1st Duke of Arco =

Spanish nobleman

The Most Excellent Alfonso Manrique de Lara 1st Duke of Arco GE
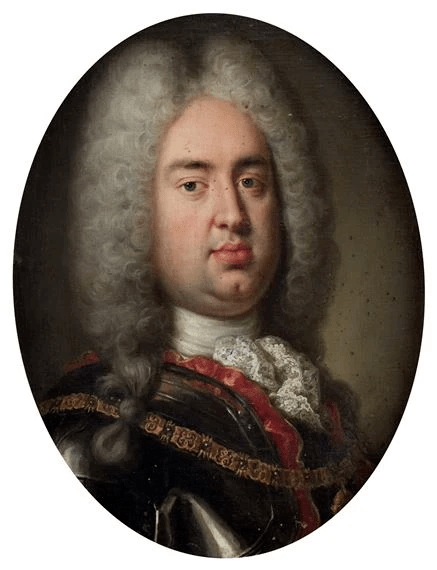
- Portrait of Alonso Manrique de Lara
- Born: Alonso Manrique de Lara y Silva; 11 January 1672; Galisteo, Spain
- Died: 27 March 1737 (aged 65); Madrid, Spain

Alonso Manrique de Lara y Silva (Galisteo, Cáceres, 11 January 1672 – Madrid, 27 March 1737), 1st Duke of Arco was an aristocrat who served the Spanish Royal House.

== Biography ==
He was the second son of Pedro Manrique de Lara, Lord of Arquillo, and of Antonia de Silva of a noble family from Toledo. He married on 31 July 1695 with Mariana Enríquez de Portugal, daughter of the Count of Montenuevo.

In 1700, he entered the service of the new King Philip V of Spain, fighting alongside him in the War of the Spanish Succession. In 1715, the King granted him the title of Duke of Arco, accompanied by the dignity of Grandee of Spain.

In 1717, he bought some land where he commissioned the construction of his Quinta del Duque del Arco. The Monarch made him his main favorite and private companion, naming Alfonso in 1721 his Caballerizo mayor. He will remain in this position when Philip V gave up to throne to his son Louis I of Spain, and also when Philip V became King again after Louis I had died.

In 1724, he was named a Knight of the Order of the Golden Fleece and in 1729 he would be named a Knight of the French Order of the Holy Spirit.

He died without an heir and was succeeded as Duke of Arco by his nephew Francisco de Asís Lasso de la Vega y Manrique.

== Sources ==
- Real Academia de la Historia
