= José María Osorio de Moscoso y Carvajal =

Spanish aristocrat and politician

The Most Excellent José María Osorio de Moscoso y Carvajal
- 16th Count of Altamira
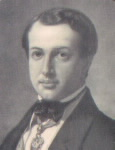
- Born: 6 October 1828; Madrid, Spain
- Died: 26 April 1881 (aged 52); Madrid, Spain
- Noble family: Osorio de Moscoso family
- Occupation: Politician

José María Osorio de Moscoso y Carvajal (Madrid, 12 April 1828 - Cabra, 4 November 1881) was a Spanish aristocrat and politician who had numerous noble titles such as Duke of Sessa and Count of Cabra. He was also the husband of the Infanta Luisa Teresa of Spain.

== Biography ==
He was born in the Palace of Altamira (Madrid), as son of Vicente Pío Osorio de Moscoso y Ponce de León, 1st Duke of Sessa, and Luisa de Carjaval y Queralt. Belonging to a noble and ancient family, he received a careful education. After the death of his father in 1864, he inherited most offices, titles and lands, as well as nine Grandees of Spain.

Among the various titles obtained were that of XVI Duke of Sessa, XX Count of Cabra, XIV Count of Altamira, XVIII Marquis of Astorga, XVIII Duke of Maqueda, V Duke of Montemar, XV Marquis of Ayamonte, XII Marquis of San Román, XX Count of Trastámara, Marquis of Villamanrique, and Lord of Villalobos.
He was also a Knight of the Order of the Golden Fleece, a Knight of the Order of Alcántara (1844), of that of San Juan, Master of Zaragoza, of the Grand Cross of the Order of Carlos III (1845), as well as a Gentleman of the chamber of the monarch Isabella II and Spanish Senator for life.

Because his parents had a close relationship with the Regent María Cristina, widow of King Ferdinand VII, he managed to marry the Infanta Luisa Teresa of Spain, sister of King Consort Francisco de Asís and cousin of Queen Isabella.
The marriage was considered a morganatic marriage, as the Infanta was of royal blood and the Duke wasn't, and for this reason they needed the permission of Isabel II to marry. This permission was granted by royal decree and two days later, the wedding was celebrated on 10 February 1847 in the Altamira palace, with her brother Francisco de Asís and her cousin Queen Isabella as witnesses. Queen Isabella also awarded José María that year the Order of the Golden Fleece.

After the Revolution of 1868, the couple supported the monarchy, sending financial aid to the dethroned Crown, considerably reducing their income and even having to sell some properties, such as the Altamira Palace, as well as the Villamanrique Palace, in the town of the same name, in addition to others.

The Duke retired to his castle of Cabra, where he died on 4 November 1881. His wife survived him by nineteen years, and she held the title of Infanta all her life. He left three children who shared his many titles and domains.

- Francisco de Asís Osorio de Moscoso y Borbón (1847-1924), had issue
- Luis María Osorio de Moscoso y Borbón (1849-1924), no issue
- María Cristina Isabel Osorio de Moscoso y Borbón (1850-1904), married Pierre Eugene, VI Prínce-Duke of Beauffremont-Courtenay,

== Sources ==
- Real Academia de la Historia
- Salazar y Acha, Jaime de (2012). Los Grandes de España (siglos XV-XVI). Ediciones Hidalguía. ISBN 978-84 939313-9-1
- Soler Salcedo, Juan Miguel (2020). Nobleza Española. Grandezas Inmemoriales (2nd edition). Madrid: Visión Libros. p. 122. ISBN 978-84-17755-62-1.
