= Santisteban del Puerto =

Santisteban del Puerto, Spain
- city
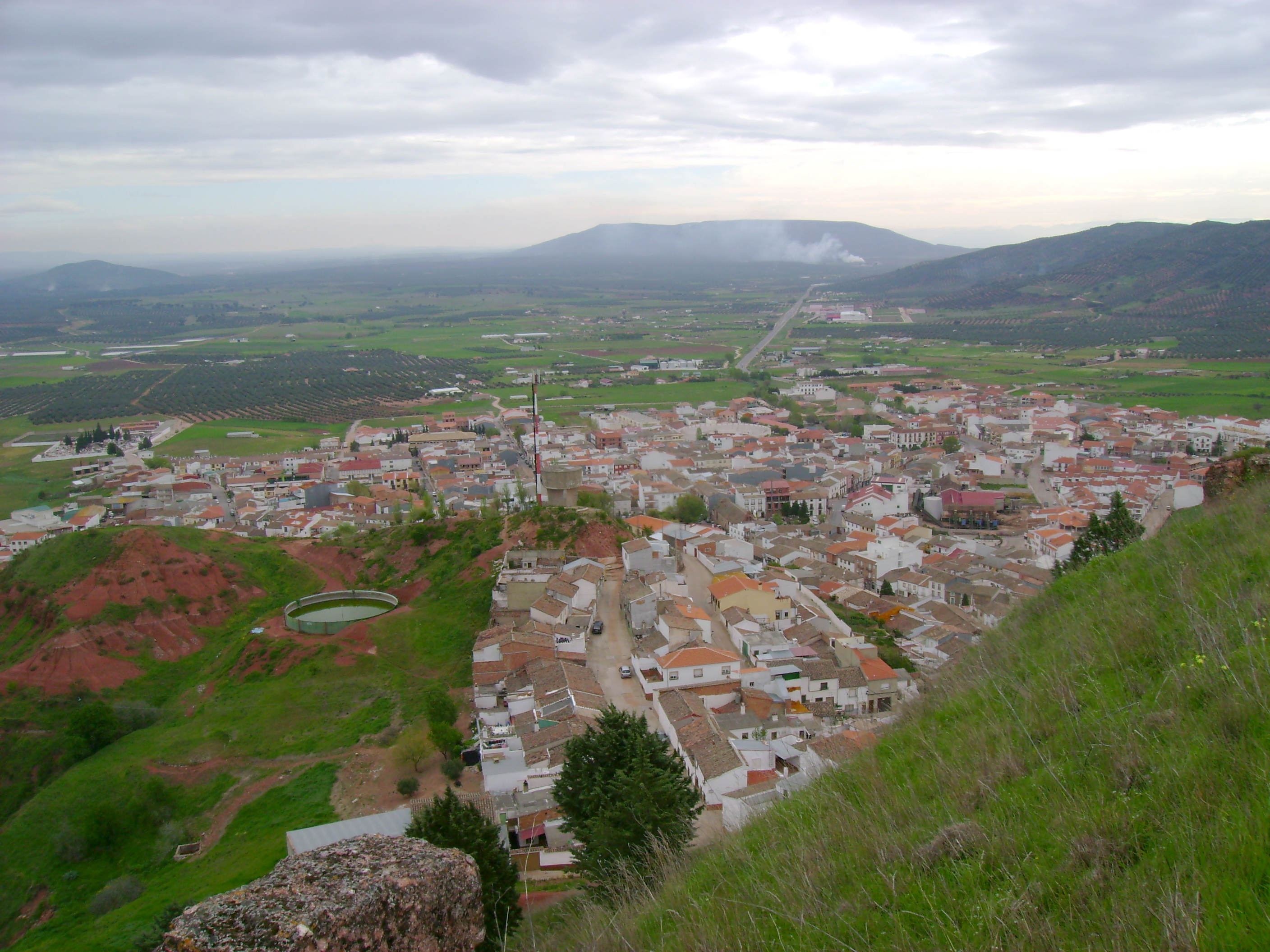
- View of Santisteban del Puerto

- Flag Coat of arms

- Location in the Province of Jaén Santisteban del Puerto (Andalusia) Santisteban del Puerto (Spain)
- Coordinates: 38°15′N 3°12′W
- Country: Spain
- Autonomous community: Andalusia
- Province: Jaén
- Municipality: Santisteban del Puerto

Area
  - Total: 373 km^{2} (144 sq mi)
- Elevation: 675 m (2,215 ft)

Population (2025-01-01)
  - Total: 4,451
  - Density: 11.9/km^{2} (30.9/sq mi)
- Time zone: UTC+1 (CET)
  - Summer (DST): UTC+2 (CEST)

Santisteban del Puerto is a city located in the province of Jaén, Spain. According to the 2005 census (INE), the city has a population of 4840 inhabitants.

== See also ==
- List of municipalities in Jaén
