= Vicente Osorio de Moscoso, 12th Count of Altamira =

Spanish peer

The Most Excellent The Count of Altamira GE
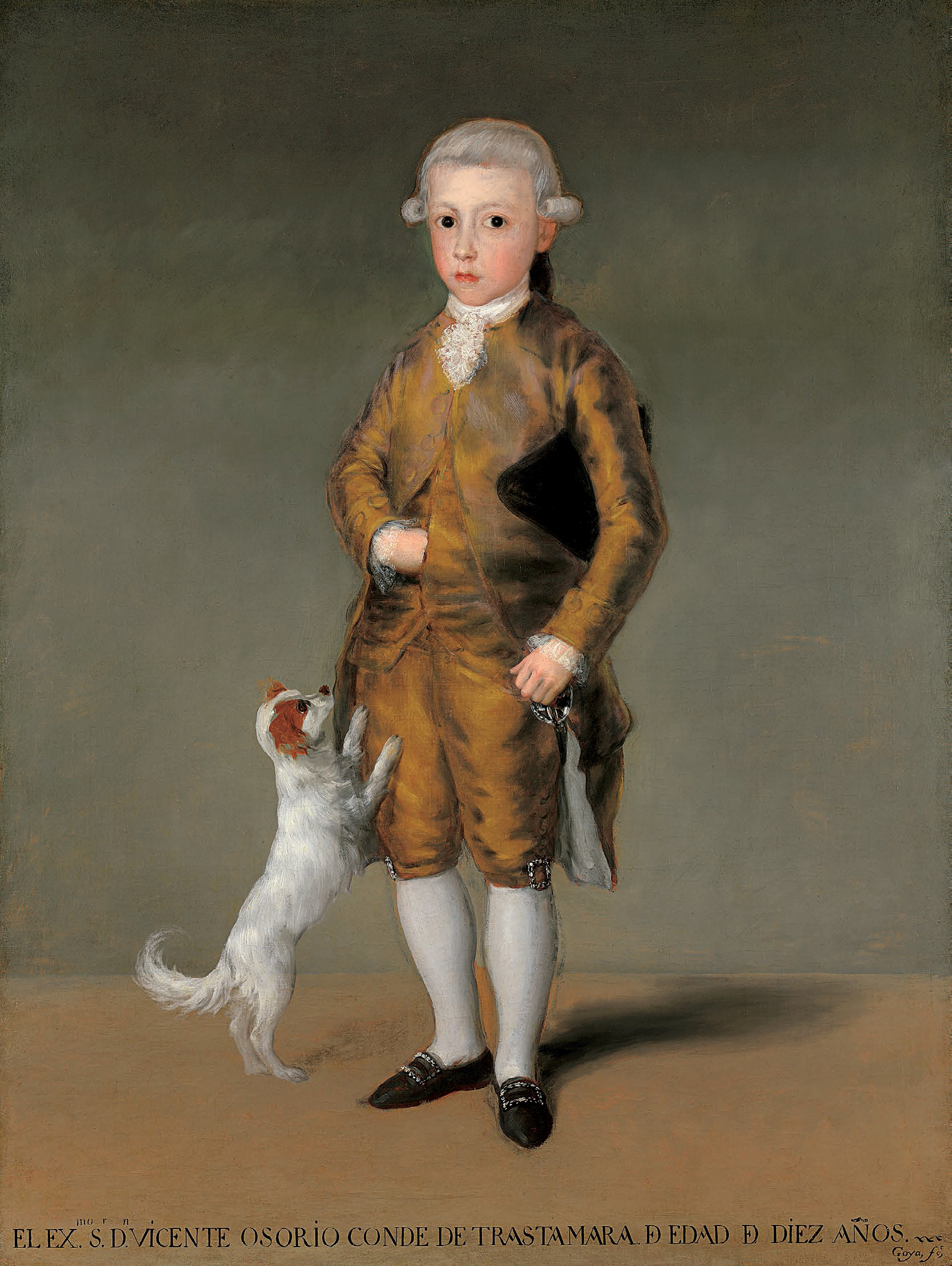
- 8-year-old Portrait by Goya, c. 1786

Personal details
- Born: Vicente Isabel Osorio de Moscoso y Álvarez de Toledo; 19 November 1777 Madrid, Spain
- Died: 31 August 1837 (aged 59) Madrid, Spain
- Spouse(s): María del Carmen Ponce de León y Carvajal, 5th Duchess of Montemar
- Children: Vicente Pío Osorio de Moscoso y Ponce de León, 13th Count of Altamira
- Parents: Vicente Joaquín Osorio de Moscoso y Guzmán, 11th Count of Altamira (father); María de la Concepción de Guzmán y de la Cerda (mother)

Vicente Isabel Osorio de Moscoso y Álvarez de Toledo, 12th Count of Altamira, GE (19 November 1777 – 31 August 1837), was a Spanish peer.

== Biography ==
Vicente Isabel was born in Madrid on 19 November 1777, son of Vicente Osorio de Moscoso y Guzmán, who was the 11th Count of Altamira. His mother was María Ignacia Álvarez de Toledo y Gonzaga, daughter of the Marquesses of Villafranca del Bierzo.

== See also ==
- List of dukes in the peerage of Spain
- List of current grandees of Spain
