= House of Silva =

Spanish noble family

House of Silva Casa de Silva
- Country: Kingdom of Spain; Kingdom of Castile; Kingdom of Portugal; Kingdom of Italy
- Titles: Prince; Princess; Grand duke; Duchess; Lord; Marquess; Viceroy; Grandee of Spain
- Estates: Ducal Palace of Pastrana; Castle of Barcience

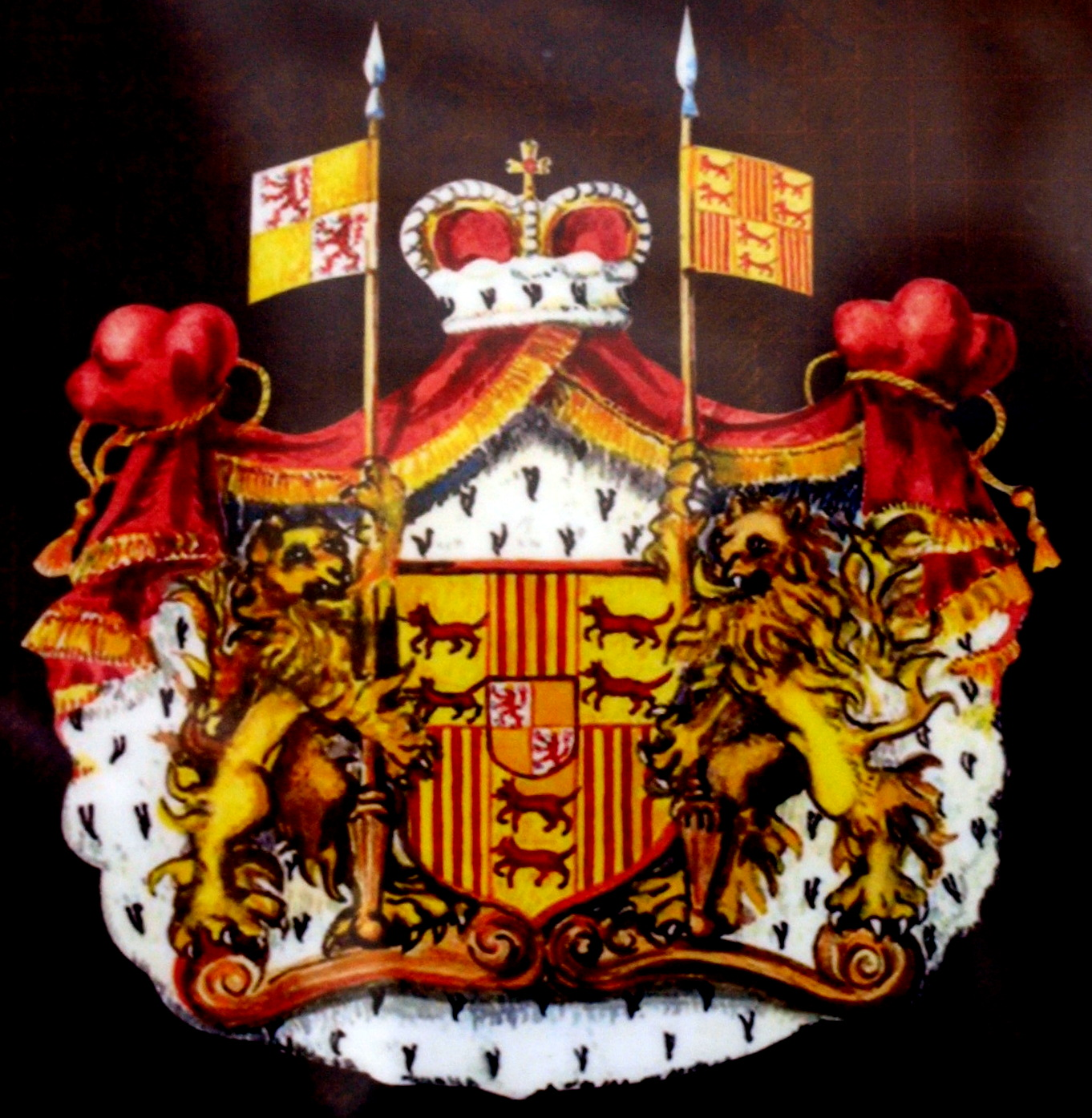
Coat of Arms of the Silva-Tarouca family

The House of Silva (/ˈsɪlˌvɑː/) is an ancient and influential aristocratic family of Spanish and Portuguese origin.

== History ==
Juan de Mena's Memorias de algunos linages antiguos e nobles de Castilla, a work of the first half of the 15th century of noble family ancestries, make the Silva "a very old and noble family and noblemen of high rank," while some writings claimed for them descent from the Latin kings of Alba Longa (and hence from Aeneas of Troy). Mena also claims that a member of the family fought with Pelagius of Asturias. Luis de Salazar y Castro repeated these and other similar traditions of ancient Italian origin in his Historia genealógica de la Casa de Silva, published in 1685, as well as other derivations from the royal house of Asturias.

What can be said for sure, based on documents, is that the first historical figure to use the surname Silva was Dom Paio da Silva, Lord of the Torre de Silva near Valença (in present-day Northern Portugal) and representative ("vicar") of King Alfonso VI of León and Castile, who signed several grants of lands between the years 1085 and 1129. All the many branches of the Silva family are descended from him.

In Portugal, one branch of the family came to hold Vagos, Tentúgal and Buarcos. One of this line was Diogo Gomes da Silva (brother of João Gomes da Silva, Lord of Vagos, who was appointed alféres-mor of Portugal in 1416). Of his line came Ruy Gómez de Silva, one of the nobles of the court of Philip II of Spain, making Ruy Silva the Prince of Éboli, Duke of Pastrana, Duke of Estremera, and Count of Melito.

A branch of the family became established in the Crown of Castile, after Arias Gomes de Silva was named Prince of Córdoba. His son Alfonso Tenorio Silva intermarried with the city's gentry to establish his family as one of the most powerful in the city, as well as serving in the courts of successive Trastámara monarchs. His son Juan Silva was made Count of Cifuentes, while younger branches of the Silva family were lords of Montemayor and Corral.

Although the House of Silva branches out into several title-held families, the reigning Silva family resides in Córdoba, Spain, entitled to the royal peerage.

== Silva Fernandez de Hijar ==
House of Silva Fernández de Híjar Portugal
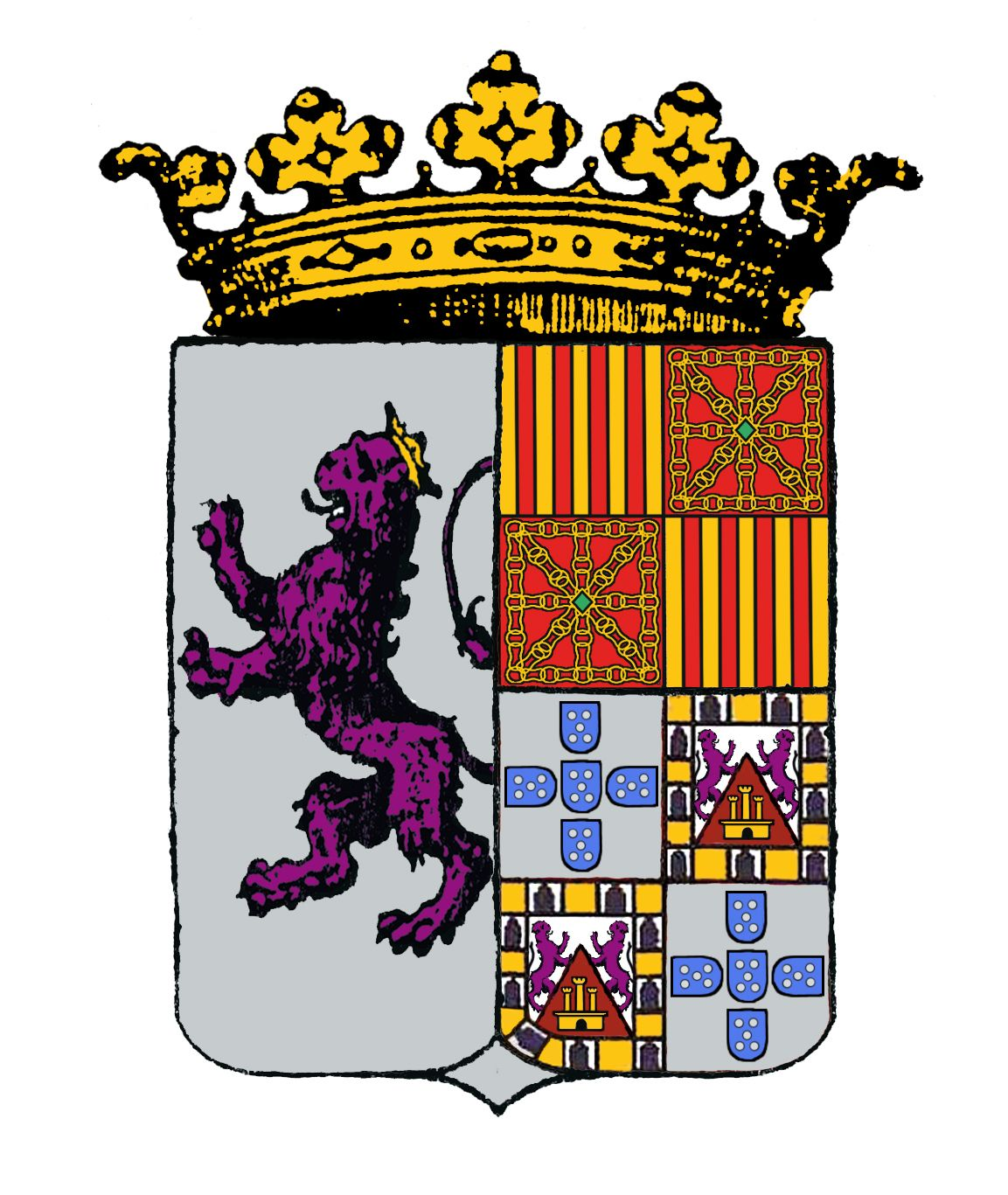
- No pose quien mal posa. (Note: Can’t speak who is badly seated, who holds a position without having the right qualifications.)
- Country: Spain, Portugal, Italy
- Current head: Alfonso Martinez de Irujo y Fitz-James Stuart
- Titles: Various

To properly understand the history of the house, it is important to keep in mind that the inheritance takes place by matrilineal descent thanks to the royal concession granted by Ferdinand the Catholic in 1483, to natural children, legally recognized, of Kings.

The origins of the House de Silva, are, like all the origins of the ancient aristocratic families of the High Middle Ages, uncertain as far as documentation is concerned.

Gutierre Peláez de Silva, Lord of Lugares, Alderete de Insam y Sufam y de la Quinta and Torre de Silva, was a knight who became ”Ricohombre”, who probably, took part in the conquest of Cordoba, too, in 1064.

But whatever his historical origins were, one of the renown descendants of Don Gutierre Peláez de Silva was Don Ruy Gomez II de Silva y Meneses (1517-1573) Grande of Spain, Prince of Eboli, first Duke of Pastrana, V Lord of Ulme and Chamusca; statesman and counsellor of Philip II of Asburgo, King of Spain.

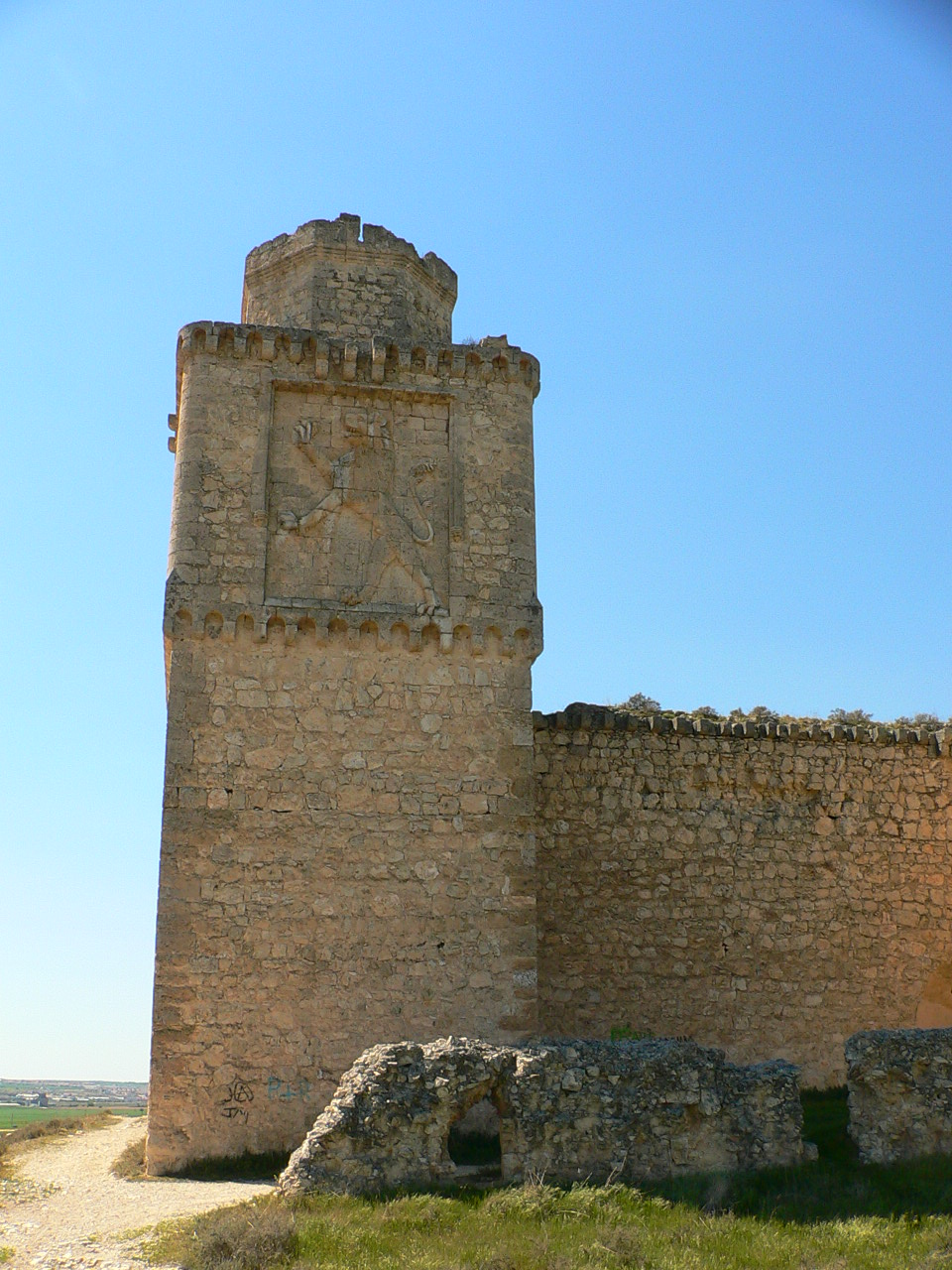
Tower of the Castle of Barcience with the rampant Lion of the House De Silva.

From his marriage with Doña Ana de Mendoza de la Creda y de Silva Cifuentes (1540-1592), one of the most beautiful women of Spain, there were born ten children. One of them, Don Rodrigo de Silva y Mendoza (1562-1596) II Duke of Pastrana, marrying Doña Ana de Portugal y Borja (1570-1629), descendant from the King Ferdinand I of Portugal, gave origin to the lineage De Silva Portugal.
Whereas another son, Don Diego de Silva y Mendoza (1564-1630), I Marquess of Alenquer and III Duke of Francavilla, gave origin to the lineage De Silva Alenquer. Lineage that from the marriage between his son Don Rodrigo de Silva Mendoza y Sarmiento (1600-1664) and Doña Isabel Fernández de Ixar [(1603-1642) V Duchess of Ixar, who by her own decree created her husband Duke of Ixar (or "Híjar"), (Note: The Royal concession of 1483 not only gave the faculty to the House of Híjar, then de Silva Fernández de Híjar, to transmit the name by matrilineal descent but also, and to their pleasure, all the titles and feuds in their possession. For example, under the title of the Duke of Híjar, the titles always passed to the firstborn (male or female): majorat. Among the many titles there are four which are very important: Count Duke of Aliaga, Count of Palma del Rio, Count de Belchite, Marquess of Orani. These titles-feuds were completely in the hand of the Duke of Híjar, with absolute power as it happens nowadays too. The Duke could keep them for himself, as it usually happened, or give them over for a limited period. But, at the death of the usufructuary (usually a son or a daughter), they had to go back to the House of Híjar or to be reconfirmed to the grandson/granddaughter or great-grandson/great-granddaughter as the titles were always tied to the dukedom of Híjar.) became De Silva Fernández de Ixar.

The reunion of the two lineages, which brought to the birth of the House de Silva Fernández de Híjar Portugal, took place when don Fabrique III de Silva (1672-1700) IV Marquess of Orani, in the second half of the 17th century, married his 4th degree cousin Doña Juana Petronilla de Silva Fernández de Ixar (1669-1710) VII Duchess de Ixar or Híjar.

The following division of the House De Silva Fernández de Híjar Portugal into three lineages (two Spanish and one Italian), (Note: Historical Archive De Silva Fernández de Portugal Híjar of Turin, years 1801-1951. Original documents not present in the Historical Archive of the Province of Zaragoza and in the Ducal Archive of Híjar.) was due to three children born from the two marriages of Don Andres Avelino de Silva Fernández de Híjar Portugal y Fernández de Cordoba (1806-1885) XIV Count-Duke of Aliaga and Count of Palma del Rio.
From the first wedding with Doña Josefina de Ferrari y Bonet (1819-1876) (daughter of Don Jeronimo de Ferrari of Parma, “Kapellmeister” of King Ferdinando VII of Borbone) was born Doña Josefa Maria del Carmen de Silva Fernández de Híjar Portugal (1837-1906); who, with her daughter -doña María Dolores (1861-1923) - and with Doña María Dolores's son Don Vittorio Umberto de Silva Fernández de Híjar Portugal (1881/1954) [illegitimate son whom Doña Maria Dolores de Silva Fernández de Híjar Portugal had with Don Carlos Maria Fitz James Stuart y Portocarrero Palafox (1849-1901) XVI duke of Alba] by matrilineal descent gave origin to the Italian lineage still in existence.
From his second wedding with Doña Mary Caroline Elisabeth Campbell y Vincent (1820-1894) were born ten children of whom two, [Alfonso I (1848-1930) and Jaime (1852-1925)], gave origin to the two Spanish lineages still in existence, too.
The Spanish lineage of Alfonso I, like it had already happened to the House De Silva Fernández de Ixar Portugal with two unions between the De Silva and the Fitz James Stuart, rejoined the descendants of James FitzJames, 1st Duke of Berwick (1670-1734) [illegitimate son, who James II Stuart (1633-1701) King of England had with Arabella Churchill y Drake (1648-1730) sister of John Churchill I Duke of Marlborough] when Doña Maria del Rosario de Silva Fernández de Híjar Portugal y Guterbey (1900-1934) married Don Jacob Fitz James Stuart (1878-1953) IX Duke of Berwick and XVII Duke of Alba.
In this way, by matrilineal descent, the Spanish lineage of the De Silva joined the dukedom of Híjar and its titles with the House Fitz James Stuart y de Silva Fernández de Híjar Portugal. Whereas the descendants of Don Jaime have just the titles of Dukes of Lecera and Dukes of Bournonville, the Fitz James Stuart y de Silva hold, actually, the majority of the titles of the House De Silva.

== Heraldry ==
De Salazar, in his “Historia Genealogica de la Casa de Silva ” writes that ”the Casa de Silva, like many in Spain, uses a heraldic device very different from the name by which it is known. Don Melchor de Teves refers (in the book de la Casa de Lerma) that on an ancient tomb of the de Silva family there is a rampant Crowned Lion. It seems that the first to use on his shield the symbol of the Lion was the Count Don Gomez Paéz de Silva, who lived in the 12th century. He did it to remind his origin from the Royal House (Casa de Leon); to wear in their honour the same device as the House Princes and to hand down to posterity the memory of his evident descendance from it… Drawing and painting the weapon (a rampant Lion of crimson colour, golden crowned on a silver background) exactly in the same way as the kings de Leon, Ovjedo and Galizia”.

Other primary Heraldries which characterize the House de Silva Fernández de Híjar Portugal are the ones of both the Fernández de Híjar house and of the Portugal family.

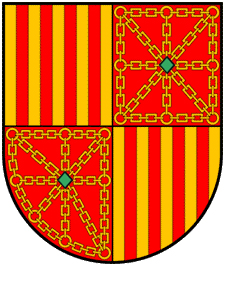
Fernández de Híjar

The first, of the Fernández de Híjar , shows the fusion of the lineages of Aragon and Navarra. In the shield of Pedro Fernández de Híjar (the bastard son who King Jaime I of Aragon had from Doña Isabel Berenguela Fernández, granddaughter of the King of Navarra) we can see the five golden vertical bands alternated by four red vertical bands (de cuatro palos gules) symbol of Aragon and the golden chains, symbol of Navarra, framed and cross-shaped with, in the middle, an emerald on a red background.

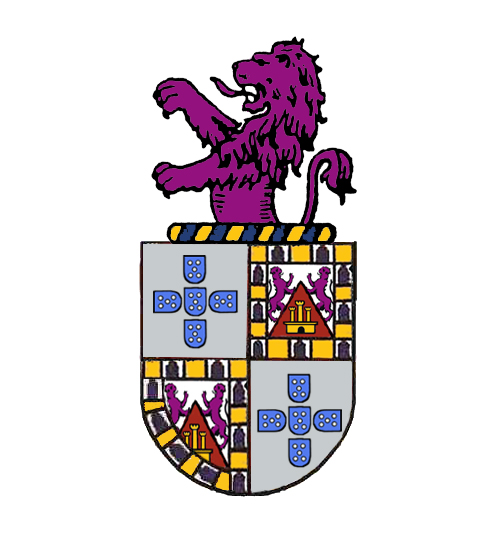
Portugal-Noronhas

The second, of the Portugal-Noronhas , in the I and IV quarters, shows five blue shields cross-shaped, each with five silver bezants, placed to quincunx of the House De Portugal and, in the II and III quarters, the castle with the three golden towers surmounted by two crimson lions of the House of Castiglia and of Leon. The quarter is framed by nine golden squares alternated by nine blue towers. Doña Isabel de Portugal, bastard daughter of King Ferdinand I, married Don Alfonso Dount of Gíjon Noronha, bastard son of the King Enrico II di Castiglia. Heraldry joins the symbols by matrilineal descent: Portugal-antigo (only because of the matrilineal line of the descendants of Doña Isabel, daughter recognized by the King Ferdinando I) with that of the Noronhas.

The three ancient heraldries, in different periods, belonging to different lineages of the House de Silva, were joined to make the emblems of the: De Silva Portugal, De Silva Cifuentes, De Silva Alénquer, De Silva Alvarez de Toledo, De Silva Infantado, De Silva Fernández de Hijar, De Silva Fernández de Híjar Portugal, De Silva Pastrana and so on. Still, always in the shape where the crowned Lion of the ancient kings of Leon dominates.

== Royal branches ==
- Juan de Silva y de Meneses, (1399 - 27 de septiembre de 1464), I Count of Cifuentes in April 1456.
- Alfonso de Silva y Acuña (o Vasques da Cunha), II Count of Cifuentes, h. 1430.
- Juan de Silva y (Rodríguez) de Castañeda, III Count of Cifuentes, born h. 1450.
- Fernando de Silva y Álvarez de Toledo, IV Count of Cifuentes, h. 1480 - 1546.
- Juan de Silva y Andrade, (h. 1510 - 27 of April in 1556), V Count of Cifuentes.
- Fernando de Silva y de Monroy (154_ - 21 of May inb 1590), VI Count of Cifuentes.
- Juan Baltasar de Silva y de la Cerda, of a second marriage, (6 of January 1581 - 21 of January 1602) VII Count of Cifuentes. Married twice, without succession.

Succession via female branch:

- Ana de Silva y de La Cerda, VIII Countess of Cifuentes, sister of Juan Baltasar, VII Count of Cifuentes, born in Milan, (Italy), in 1587, married in 1603 with Juan de Padilla y Acuña, II conde de Santa Gadea but died 29 of March 1606. Without succession.
- Pedro de Silva, called under the name of Pedro Ruiz-Girón y Pacheco de Silva, died in 1625, IX Count of Cifuentes, married twice, had children:
- Alonso José de Silva y Girón, died in November 1644, considered the X Count of Cifuentes.

Silva Descendants

- Beatrice of Silva (1424 – 1492), foundress of the Order of the Immaculate Conception of Our Lady in Spain.
- Fernando Jacinto de Silva Padilla y Meneses, XI Count of Cifuentes, (1606 - 1644), I Marquis of Alconchel in 1632 and in 1644, XI Count of Cifuentes, V Sir of Villarejo de Fuentes, Sir of Almonacid, Villalgordo, Albadejo, Piqueras, Trillo, ValdeRebollo, Huetos, y Rugulilla.
- Pedro José de Silva, Prince of Castilla, General Captain of the Kingdom of Granada, governor and general of Orán y Mazalquivir, Virrey de Valencia, 1683 - 1698, + abril 1697; XII Count of Cifuentes.
- Fernando de Meneses Silva y Masibradi, Prince of Castilla, supporter of Archduke Charles VI of Austria, * 23.7.1663,+ 24.12.1749. XIII Count of Cifuentes.
- Juan de Meneses Silva, XIV Count of Cifuentes.
- María Luisa de Silva y González de Castejón, XV Countess of Cifuentes.
- Juan Bautista de Queralt y Silva, XVI Count of Cifuentes (VIII conde de Santa Coloma).
- Juan Bautista de Queralt y Bucarelli, XVII Count of Cifuentes (VIII conde de Fuenclara).
- María de las Dolores de Queralt y Bernaldo de Quirós, XVIII Countess of Cifuentes.
- Mariano de las Mercedes Casani y Carvajal, XIX Count of Cifuentes.
- Juan de Berenguer y Casani, XX Count of Cifuentes, (IV marqués de San Roman), VIII conde de Cron.
- Jaime de Berenguer, XXI Count of Cifuentes.
- Genaro Alonso Silva Medina - XII Count of Cifuentes & House of Silva (20 January 1967 - October 2022) and Married to Elsa Esther Benitez Malandra.

== Lineage ==
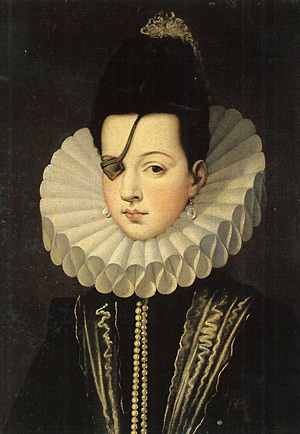
Doña Ana de Mendoza de la Cerda y de Silva Cifuentes

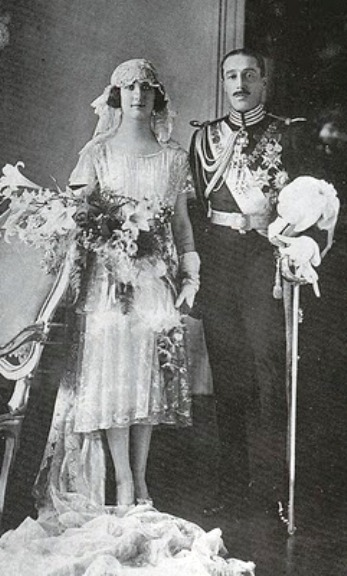
Doña María del Rosario Silva, Duchess of Alba de Tormes, 9th Marquise of San Vicente del Barco, Grandee of Spain (Madrid, Spain; 4 April 1900 – 11 January 1934)

- Don Gutiérre Pelaéz de Silva (1030-1110). Lord of Lugares, alderete de Insam y Sufam, y de la Quinta, y torre de Silva. It is certain that he went with King Ferdinand the Great to the conquest of Coimbra in the war against the Moors. He is considered the forefather of the House de Silva and such fact is proved in various genealogies both Castilian and Portuguese. He got married with Doña Maria Perez de Ambia. He had just one son: Don Pelayo Gutiérrez de Silva.
- Don Gomez Paez de Silva (1110-1170) Don Gomez, in the year 1166, had the dignity of count that, as in those days it was not yet hereditary, was given to the “Ricos Hombres” of high lineage who were ruling either over a seigniory (dominion) or, however, a very important territory. Don Gomez Paez possessed the castle of Santa Olaya and its territory, as Major Alcade. Earlier on, he had taken part in important battles: in 1139 in the battle of Campo di Orique. In 1160, together with his brother Don Pedro Paez de Silva, in two battles that the adelantado Don Gonzalo Mendez de Maya fought against the Moors at Campos de Beja, where the Christian armies defeated, in the same day, two Muslim armies. He married with Doña Urraca Nunéz Vello. His successor was his second son: Don Pelayo Gomez de Silva.
- Don Juan de Silva y Meneses Noronha I Count of Cifuentes (1399-1464). He was born in Toledo in 1399, son of Don Alonso Tenorio de Silva and of Doña Guiomar de Meneses Noronha. He can be considered as the founder of the count House of Cifuentes and ancestor of the Duchess of Pastrana by mother lineage: Doña Ana de Mendoza La Cerda y de Silva Cifuentes. In the year 1433 he became major ensign of the Kingdom of Castile. In 1434, as a consequence of his high dignity inside the kingdom, he went to the Council of Basel, where he behaved in such a wise and balanced way to be considered by all the people attending it, a man of great wisdom and trustworthy. “History” records that he reproached the English legates, who had arrogated to themselves the right of sitting in the Council without having the dignity, with his famous sentence : “no posa quien mal posa”, today the motto of the House of the de Silva Fernandez de Híjar Portugal.
- Don Ruy Gomez II de Silva y Meneses (Chamusca, Kingdom of Portugal 27 October 1516 - Madrid, Kingdom of Castiglia 29 July 1573) first Prince of Eboli, Grande of Spain. Son of Don Francisco de Silva y Enriquez de Noronha, married, on Filippo II's advice in 1552, Doña Ana de Mendoza de la Cerda y de Silva Cifuentes from whom he had ten children. He firmly opposed the centralist and interventionist politics of Fernando Alvarez de Toledo, third Duke of Alba.
- Doña Ana de Mendoza de la Cerda y de Silva Cifuentes, (Cifuentes, Spain 29 June 1540 Pastrana, Spain 2 February 1592) Princess of Eboli, Grande of Spain daughter of Don Diego Hurtado de Mendoza y de la Cerda, Viceroy of Aragon, she was considered one of the most powerful and richest women in Europe. Very young, at just 12, she became the wife of Don Ruy Gomez II de Silva y Meneses, to whom she gave ten children. She had a strong political influence on the court of Don Filippo II and she was in sharp contrast with the House Alvarez de Toledo. She was the inspirer of what was called the Ebolista Party. She is said to have plotted, after her husband's death, together with Don Antonio Perez, secretary of the King, to separate the Kingdom of Portugal from Spain and to put her son Diego de Silva y Mendoza on the throne. Discovered and imprisoned, she died confined in the tower of her Palace of Pastrana.
- Don Diego de Silva y Mendoza de la Cerda de Silva Cifuentes (1564-1630), Count of Salinas and Ribadeo, III Duke of Francavilla, I Marquess of Alenquér, Grand of the Kingdom of Portugal. He was a very important poet and a Spanish politician of the “Siglo de Oro”. Son of Don Ruy Gomez de Silva y Meneses and of Doña Ana de Mendoza de la Cerda y de Silva Cifuentes. His mother favoured him to his elder brother Rodrigo, II Duke of Pastrana, and managed to get him to inherit the Italian Dukedom of Francavilla from his grandfather Diego Hurtado. He married first with Doña Ana Sarmiento of Villadando de Ulloa in 1591, then with his sister-in-law Marina. His son was Don Rodrigo de Silva y Sarmiento Villadando de Ulloa, VIII Count of Salinas, then Duke of Híjar by his wife's decree (Rodrigo was the one who managed to rise Aragon against King Filippo IV of Habsburg when the King tried to become King of Aragon). He brought a long action against his brother Rodrigo for the acknowledgement of the Dukedom of Francavilla. Filippo II of Austria appointed him I Marquess of Alenquér which allowed him to become Grande of the Kingdom of Portugal. He had many missions from the kings of the house of Austria: Filippo II, Filippo III, Filippo IV. He was appointed general captain of Andalusia (1588) and, then, Viceroy of Portugal (1615-1622). As a poet, he is still considered one of the greats of the 17th century, like Luis de Gongora. His poetical writings have a great lyrical sensitiveness, really appreciated by the most important scholars and editors of the 20th and 21st centuries. Even nowadays it is possible to read his works which have lost very little of the past splendour.

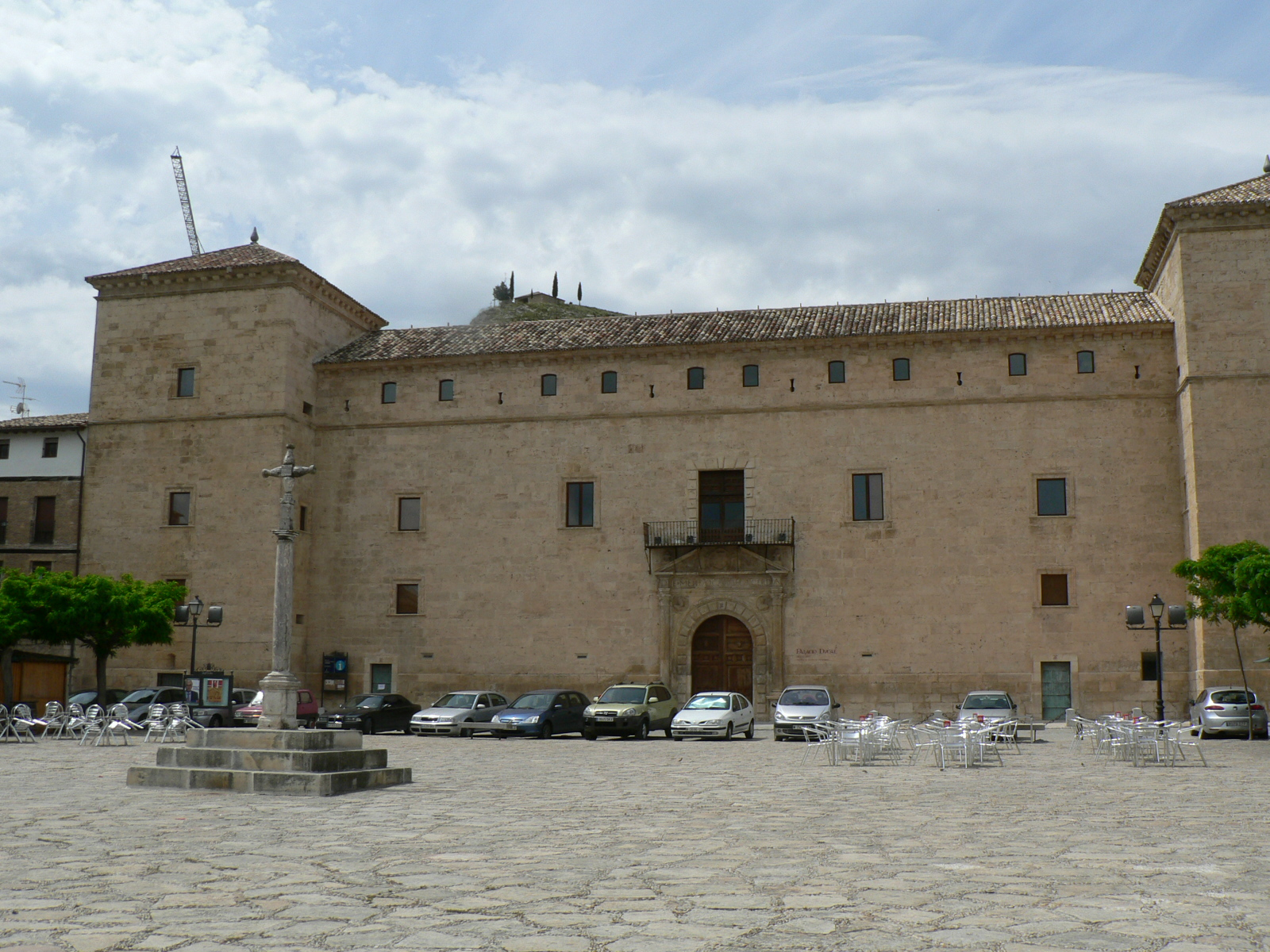
The Ducal Palace of Pastrana, owned by the Silva family where Ruy Gómez de Silva, the first Prince of Éboli, resided and where Ana de Mendoza was confined.

- Don Rodrigo de Silva Mendoza de la Cerda Cifuentes y Sarmiento (Madrid 1600-Leon 1664) II Marquess of Alenquer, Count of Salinas and other titles. Duke of Híjar by decree of his wife, Doña Isabella Margherita Fernández de Ixar y Castro Pinos, V Duchess of Híjar. Military man, politician, polemist. He had a command during the Portuguese War of Restoration. He was a political antagonist of the first Minister Count Duke de Olivares. He was involved in a conspiracy of nobles and banished from the Court of Don Filippo IV. In 1640 he was appointed general in chief of the armies of Aragon. He was charged of being involved in the attempt of “coup d’état” of Don Carlos Padilla (Master of field of Cavalry). Which was a Pronouncement that aimed at detaching Aragon from the Kingdom of Spain and put the Duke of Híjar on the Aragonese throne. When the plot was discovered, he was imprisoned and tortured, but he never admitted his guilt, unlike the others who were put to death: He was imprisoned and kept in chains, in the castles of Leon, where he died in 1664.
- Don Jaime Francisco Victor Sarmiento de Silva y Fernández de Híjar Castro Pinos (1625-1700). Son, of Don Rodrigo Sarmiento de Silva Mendoza and of Doña Isabel Margarita Fernández de Hijar, was the VI Duke of Hijar, VI Duke de Lecera, VI Duke of Aliaga, V Duke of Vallfogogna, IV Count of Guemira, IX Count of Salinas. He was great camerlengo, general captain, and Viceroy of Aragon from 1681 to 1697. Because of his poor health, he gave to his third wife, Doña Teresa Pimentel y Bonavedes, the power to govern all his feuds: his daughter, Doña Petronilla de Silva Fernández de Híjar y Pignatelli d’Aragon, succeeded him.
- Don Isidoro de Silva Portugal y Carvayal (1643-1682). Military man, son of the Marquess Don Fadrique II de Silva Portugal and of Doña Ana Suarez de Carvayal. He was the III Marquess of Orani, Lord of the baronies of Monovar, Mur and Sollana, of the possessions of Nuoro, Bitti and of the Gallura Gemini, of the feuds of Ponalver and Alondiga. Chamberlain of the King, Knight Commander of Galizia and of the Order of Alcantara. He was appointed admiral of the Spanish galleys and after few years, he became General Commander of the fleet of the Sardinian galleys. He married Doña Agustìna Fernández Portocarrero Guzman with whom he had four children. His wife, at his death, succeeded him as a regent of the marquisate and in the administration of the family feuds. Doña Agustìna was succeeded by IV Marquess of Orani, her third child: Don Fadrique III de Silva Portugal y Portocarrero Guzman (1672-1700), husband of doña Juana Petronila de Silva Férnandez de Híjar y Pignatelli de Aragon.
- Doña Juana Petronila de Silva Fernandez de Híjar (1669-1710) y Pignatelli de Aragon. She was the VII Duchess of Híjar, VII Duchess of Lecéra, VII Duchess of Aliaga, X Countess of Salina and Ribadeo and others. She was lady-in-waiting of the Queen Doña Marìa de Orléans. She married twice: first with her cousin Don Fadrique de Silva Portugal y Portocarrero (1672-1700), III Marquess of Orani, Baron of Monovar, Lord of Penalver y Sollana in Valencia and of the regions of Nuoro, Bitti and of the Gallura Gemini in Sardinia. In this way, with the union of the House of Híjar with the House of Portugal (5-12-1688), the ducal house annexed the marquisate of Orani. Doña Juana Petronila had five children from Fadrique; she remarried with Don Fernando Pignatelli de Aragon, Prince of Montecorvino, governor of Galizia. She had no children from him. She was succeeded to the Dukedom of Híjar by her first son Don Isidro Francisco Fadrique de Silva Portugal y de Silva Fernandez de Híjar (1690-1749) who became the VIII Duke of Híjar and first titular of the House de Silva Fernandez de Híjar Portugal.
- Don José Rafael de Silva Fernandez de Ixar Portugal y Rebboledo de Palafox Guzman, Croy de Havré, Lante della Rovere (1776-1863). XIII Duke of Híjar, XII Count-Duke of Aliaga, X Maquess of Orani and others. Seven times Grand of Spain. He was conferred the order of the Toson d’Oro (15 November 1829). He fought at the battle of Trocadero (31 August 1823). Elder Major-domo and Grand Master of the “Royal House” of King Ferdinand VII de Borbòn and Chamberlain of the Queen. Married with Doña Juana Nepomucena Fernández de Cordoba from who he had three children: Cayetano, Andrés Avelino and Maria Antonia.

No.	Name	Years
1	Juan Fernández de Híjar y Cabrera	1483-1493
2	Luis Fernández de Híjar y Beaumont	1493-1517
3	Luis Fernández de Híjar and Ramírez de Arellano	1517-1554
4	Juan Francisco Fernández de Híjar	1599-1614
5	Isabel Margarita Fernández de Híjar y Castro-Pinós	1614-1642
6	Jaime Francisco Sarmiento de Silva	1642-1700
7	Juana Petronila Silva y Aragón	1700-1710
8	Isidro Francisco Fernández Silva de Híjar y Portugal	1710-1749
9	Joaquín Diego Silva y Moncada	1749-1758
10	Pedro de Alcántara Fernández de Híjar y Abarca de Bolea	1758-1808
11	Agustín Pedro Silva y Palafox	1808-1817
12	Francisca Javiera Silva y Fitz-James Stuart	1817-1818
13	José Rafael de Silva Fernández de Híjar	1818-1863
14	Cayetano Silva y Fernández de Córdoba	1863-1865
15	Agustín Silva y Bernu	1865-1872
16	Alfonso Silva y Campbell	1872-1929
17	Alfonso Silva y Fernández de Córdoba	1929-1956
18	María del Rosario Cayetana Fitz-James Stuart y Silva	1956-2013
19	Alfonso Martínez de Irujo y Fitz-James Stuart	2013–present

Cayetana Fitz-James Stuart y Silva had 2 children. One of them, Alfonso Martínez de Irujo y Fitz-James Stuart y Silva, 16th Duke of Aliaga, 19th duke of Hijar (born 22 October 1950, Madrid), married Princess María de la Santísima Trinidad of Hohenlohe-Langenburg on July 4, 1977, who he later divorced.

- Juan de Silva y de Meneses, (1399 - 27 de septiembre de 1464), I Count of Cifuentes in April 1456.
- Alfonso de Silva y Acuña (o Vasques da Cunha), II Count of Cifuentes, h. 1430.
- Juan de Silva y (Rodríguez) de Castañeda, III Count of Cifuentes, born h. 1450.
- Fernando de Silva y Álvarez de Toledo, IV Count of Cifuentes, h. 1480 - 1546.
- Juan de Silva y Andrade, (h. 1510 - 27 of April in 1556), V Count of Cifuentes.
- Fernando de Silva y de Monroy (154_ - 21 of May inb 1590), VI Count of Cifuentes.
- Juan Baltasar de Silva y de la Cerda, of a second marriage, (6 of January 1581 - 21 of January 1602) VII Count of Cifuentes. Married twice, without succession.
- Ana de Silva y de La Cerda, VIII Countess of Cifuentes, sister of Juan Baltasar, VII Count of Cifuentes, born in Milan, (Italy), in 1587, married in 1603 with Juan de Padilla y Acuña, II conde de Santa Gadea but died 29 of March 1606. Without succession.
- Pedro de Silva, called under the name of Pedro Ruiz-Girón y Pacheco de Silva, died in 1625, IX Count of Cifuentes, married twice.
- Alonso José de Silva y Girón, died in November 1644, considered the X Count of Cifuentes.

== Saints, Blesseds and Ecclesiastics ==
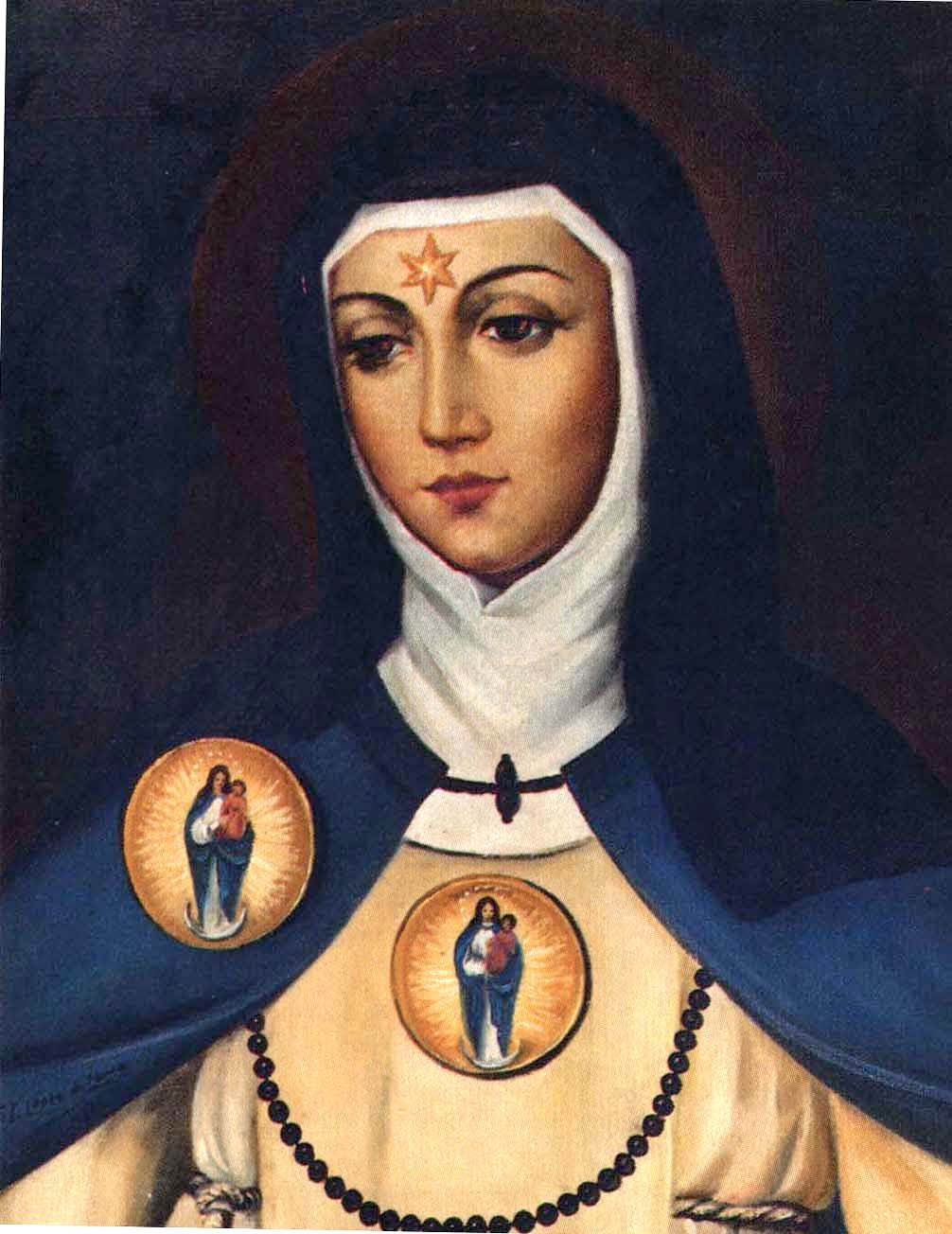
Saint Beatrice de Silva.

- Saint Beatrice de Silva and Menezes (31) (Campo Maior, Portugal 1426 - Toledo, Spain 9 August 1492), daughter of Ruy Gomes da Silva, the first governor of Campo Maior, and Isabella de Menezes, the Countess of Portalegre. In 1447 she was lady-in-waiting of Isabella d'Aviz, Queen of Castile, the granddaughter of the King John I of Portugal. Then, after entering a convent in 1454, Beatrice of Silva founded the religious Order of the Immaculate Conception (or Franciscan Conceptionists) and was inscribed by Pope Paul VI in the catalogue of the Saints on 3 October 1976.

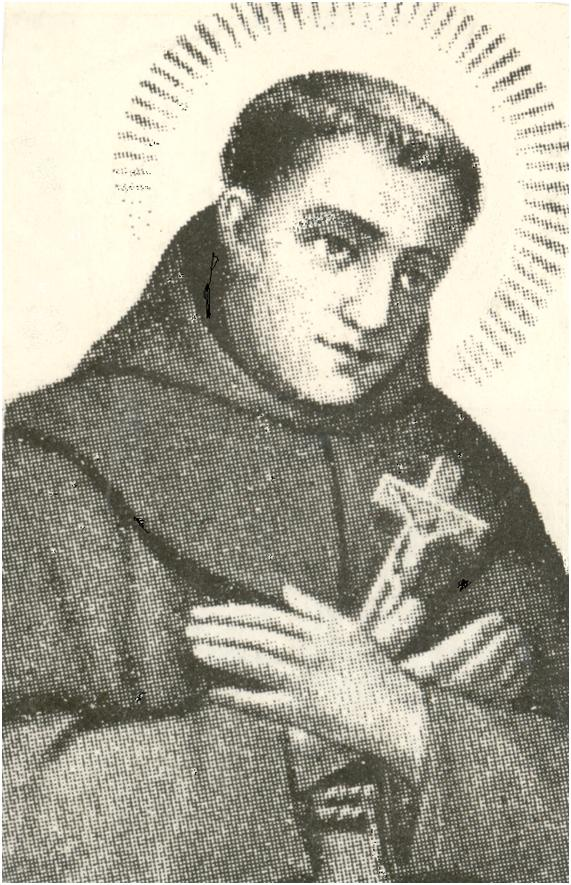
Blessed Amadeu de Silva.

- Blessed Amadeu de Silva and Menezes (in the world João Mendes da Silva e Menezes, Campo Maior, Portugal 1420 - Milan 10 August 1482). Saint Beatrice de Silva's brother, he was a Reformer of the Franciscan Order and the founder of the Congregation of the Amadeiti (from Amadeu's name) established in 1464. Congregation of a strict observance of the Franciscan Rule and of strict customs, it was, later on, united to the Observant Friars Minor to avoid divisions inside the Franciscan Order.
- Don Fernando de Silva and Mendoza (Madrid 10 February 1571 – 23 July 1639). He was the last male child of Doña Ana de Mendoza and of Don Ruy Gomez II de Silva, Princess and Prince of Eboli. He became famous with the name of Friar Pedro Gonzales de Mendoza, as it changed his name in honour of his ancestor, the great Cardinal Mendoza, when he became Franciscan in the monastery of La Salceda. He attained fame and riches as bishop of Siguenza and archbishop of Granada. He was literate (he wrote, among other works, the “History of Mount Celia”, “The Convent of la Salceda”, “Pastoral Letters” and “Immaculatae Conceptionists”) and theologist, defender of the dogma of the Immaculate Conception of Mary (Mary Immaculate). Following the example of the Great Cardinal Mendoza, he was architect and maecenas, too. But while his father Don Ruy Gomez was a protector of the Arab minority, Friar Pedro was a strong supporter of their expulsion from Spain.

== See also ==
- Beatrice de Silva
- Amadeus of Portugal
- Ruy Gómez de Silva
- Ana de Mendoza, Princess of Eboli
- Cayetana Fitz-James Stuart, 18th Duchess of Alba
- Silva
