= Andrés Avelino de Silva y Fernández de Córdoba, 13th Duke of Aliaga =

Spanish aristocrat (1806-1885)

Andrés Avelino de Silva y Fernández de Córdoba, 13th Duke of Aliaga (28 November 1806 - 8 January 1885) was a Spanish aristocrat.

== Early life ==
Andrés Avelino de Silva y Fernández de Córdoba was born on 28 November 1806 into the noble House of Silva. He was the second son of José Rafael de Silva Fernández de Híjar, 12th Duke of Híjar (1776–1863), and Juana Nepomucena Fernández de Córdoba Villarroel Spínola y la Cerda, 8th Countess of Salvatierra (1785–1813). His elder brother was Cayetano de Silva y Fernández de Córdoba.

== Career ==
Upon the death of his father in 1863, his elder brother succeeded to the senior title of Duke of Híjar, and he succeeded to some of his subsidiary titles, including as the 13th Duke of Aliaga, 16th Marquess of Almenara, 9th Marquess of Sobroso, 10th Count of Salvatierra (from his mother), and 15th Count of Palma del Río. Upon his elder brother's death two years later in 1865, the dukedom of Híjar passed to his nephew, Agustín de Silva y Bernuy, 14th Duke of Híjar. When Agustín died in 1872, the dukedom should have reverted to Andrés Avelino, as his nephew died without issue, but the Duke of Aliaga renounced his right to the title in favor of his first-born son Alfonso, who succeeded as the 15th Duke of Híjar.

He was also a Gentleman of the Real Maestranza de Caballería de Sevilla.

== Personal life ==
On 22 February 1843 in Madrid, he married Mary Caroline Campbell, a daughter of William Johnston Campbell and the former Anna Maria Vincent (a daughter of Sir Francis Vincent, 8th Baronet). Mary was a granddaughter of Lt.-Gen. Colin Campbell and niece of Sir Guy Campbell, 1st Baronet. Together, they were the parents of:

- Alfonso de Silva y Campbell, 15th Duke of Híjar (1848–1930), who married María del Dulce Nombre Fernández de Córdoba y Pérez de Barradas, a daughter of Tomás Luis Fernández de Córdoba Aguilar-Ponce de León (son of the 14th Duke of Medinaceli), and Ángela María Apolonia Pérez de Barradas y Bernuy, 1st Duchess of Tarifa.
- Andrés Avelino de Silva y Campbell, 19th Count of Belchite (1851–1908), who married María Teresa Cavero y Urzáiz, daughter of the Count of Sobradiel [es], in 1878.
- Jaime de Silva y Campbell, 15th Duke of Lécera (1852–1926), who married Agustina Mitjáns y Manzanedo, a daughter of Francisco de Paula Mitjáns y Colinó and Josefa Manzanedo e Intentas, 2nd Marchioness of Manzanedo.

The Duke died on 8 January 1885. He was succeeded in the dukedom of Aliaga by his grandson, Alfonso de Silva y Fernández de Córdoba (1877–1955), the eldest son of his eldest son, Alfonso de Silva y Campbell.

=== Descendants ===
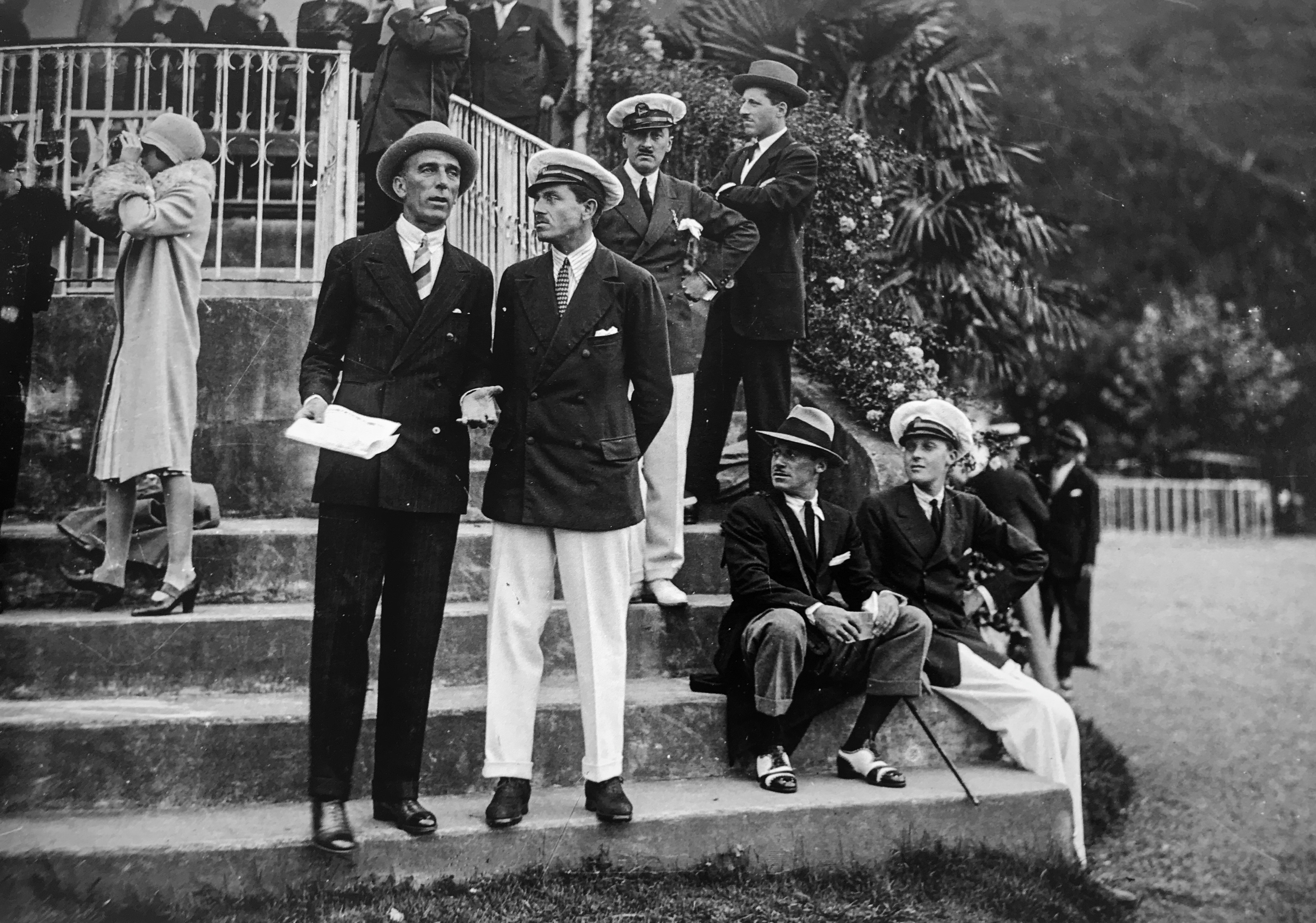
Standing in the foreground, the 16th Duke of Lécera in white trousers. Sitting, the 8th Count of Yebes and the Prince of Asturias respectively, San Sebastián, 1927

Through his eldest son, he was the grandfather of Alfonso de Silva y Fernández de Córdoba, 16th Duke of Híjar, 14th Duke of Aliaga (who married María del Rosario Gurtubay y González de Castejón in 1899), (Note: Alfonso de Silva y Fernández de Córdoba, 16th Duke of Híjar, was the father of María del Rosario de Silva, Duchess of Alba, sole heiress of all the titles of her father and of the fortune of her mother. Before her early death, she married Jacobo Fitz-James Stuart, 17th Duke of Alba, with whom she had one daughter, Cayetana Fitz-James Stuart, 18th Duchess of Alba.) Don Andres Avelino de Silva y Fernández de Córdoba (who died unmarried in 1918), and María Araceli Silva Fernández de Córdoba, 11th Duchess of Almazán (wife of Alfonso Mariátegui Pérez De Barradas, 11th Marquess of Cortes de Graena).

Through his youngest son, he was the grandfather of Jaime de Silva y Mitjans, 16th Duke of Lécera (1893–1976), José Guillermo de Silva y Mitjáns, 13th Duke of Bournonville (b. 1895), María Luisa de Silva y Mitjáns (b. 1898), who married José Alvarez de las Asturias Bohórques y Arteaga, 15th Marquess of Almenara, and Beatriz de Silva y Mitjans (1902–1998), who married Mauricio Álvarez de las Asturias Bohorques y Goyeneche, 5th Duke of Gor.

Spanish nobility
| Preceded by José Rafael Fernández de Híjar | Duke of Aliaga; 1863–1885 | Succeeded by Alfonso de Silva y Campbell |
