= Barcience =

Coordinates: 39°59′N 4°14′W

- municipality
- Flag Coat of arms
- Interactive map of Barcience
- Country: Spain
- Autonomous community: Castile-La Mancha
- Province: Toledo
- Municipality: Barcience

Area
  - Total: 19 km^{2} (7.3 sq mi)
- Elevation: 513 m (1,683 ft)

Population (2025-01-01)
  - Total: 1,110
  - Density: 58/km^{2} (150/sq mi)
- Time zone: UTC+1 (CET)
  - Summer (DST): UTC+2 (CEST)

Barcience is a municipality located in the province of Toledo, Castile-La Mancha, Spain.

== History ==
The village was ceded to the House of Silva by Henry IV.

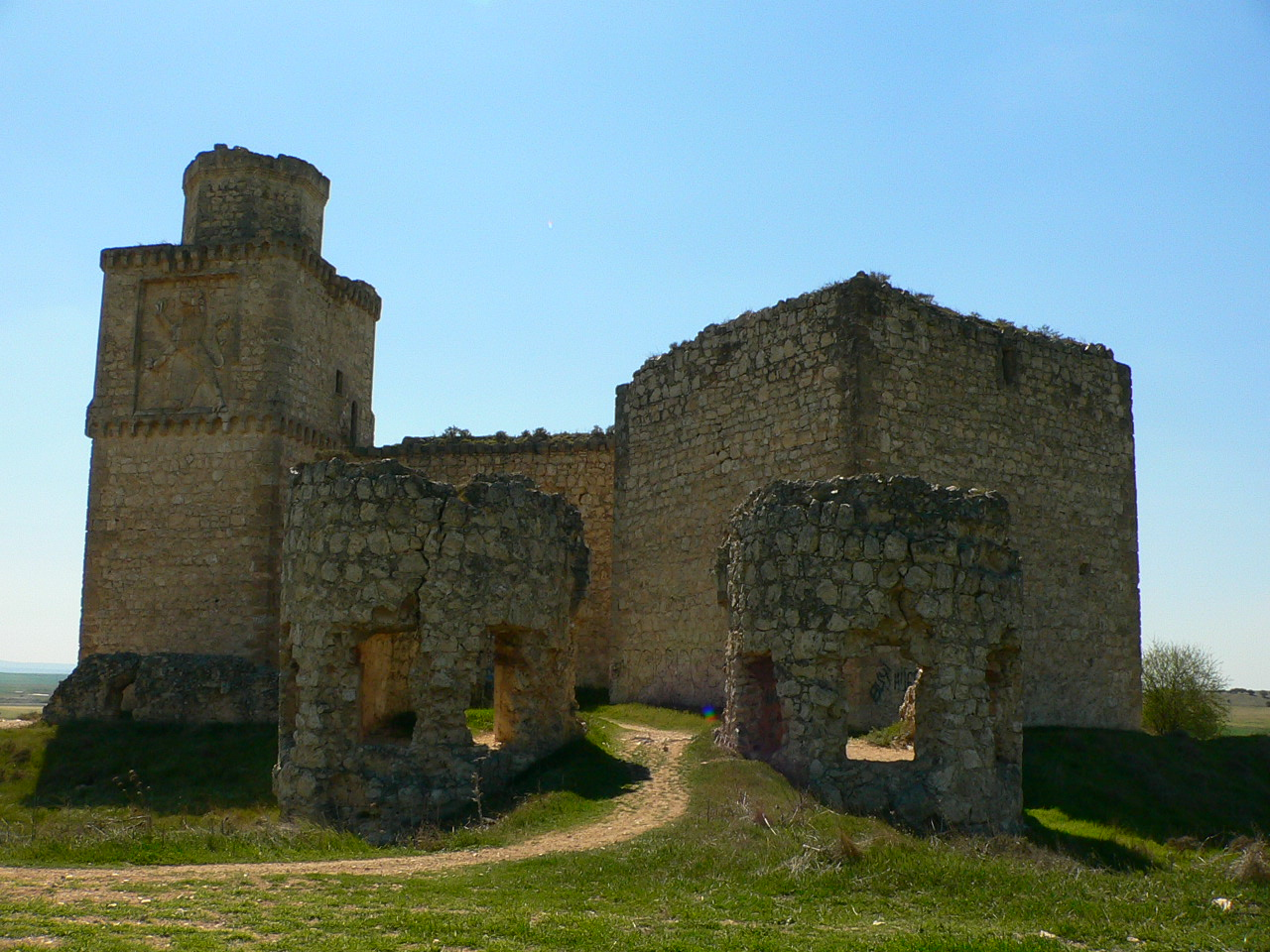
Remains of the 'Castle of Barcience'. It was built in the 15th century by the counts of Cifuentes, whose emblem was the lion. It was used for artillery in the 16th century.

== Demographics ==
Historical population
Year	Pop.	±%
1900	277	—
1910	274	−1.1%
1920	291	+6.2%
1930	345	+18.6%
1940	220	−36.2%
1950	378	+71.8%
1960	300	−20.6%
1970	163	−45.7%
1981	171	+4.9%
1991	112	−34.5%
2001	107	−4.5%
2011	671	+527.1%
2021	940	+40.1%
2023	1,039	+10.5%
Source:INE
