= Cayetano Martínez =

Spanish equestrian

The Most Excellent The Duke of Arjona GE OLY
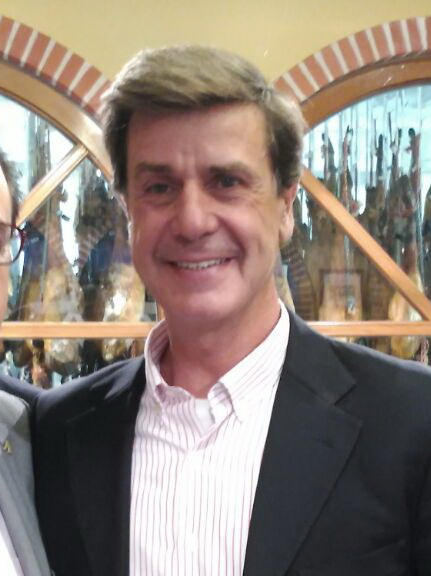
- Cayetano Martínez in 2016
- Full name: Cayetano Martínez de Irujo y Fitz-James Stuart
- Born: 4 April 1963 (age 63); Madrid, Spain
- Noble family: House of Alba
- Spouse: Genoveva Casanova y González (m. 2001; div. 2007) Bárbara Mirjan Aliende (m. 2025)
- Issue: Luis Martínez de Irujo y Casanova; Amina Martínez de Irujo y Casanova
- Father: Luis Martínez de Irujo y Artázcoz
- Mother: Cayetana Fitz-James Stuart, 18th Duchess of Alba

Cayetano Martínez de Irujo y Fitz-James Stuart, 4th Duke of Arjona, 14th Count of Salvatierra, GE, OLY (born 4 April 1963) is a Spanish equestrian. He competed in equestrian events at the 1992 Summer Olympics.

He is the current Count of Salvatierra and Duke of Arjona. He had been married to the Mexican-born model and TV personality Genoveva Casanova, with whom he has a son and a daughter (twins). On 4 October 2025 he married Bárbara Mirjan, who works as a events coordinator.

== Achievements ==
Martínez de Irujo achieved what was probably the most important result of his career at the 1992 Summer Olympics in Barcelona, where he finished fourth in the team competition with the Spanish team. He also competed at three European Championships, four World Championships, and several Nations Cup events. In 2006, he became Spanish show jumping champion with Kesberoy St. Aubert.

=== Olympic Games ===
- 1992, Barcelona: with Palestro – 4th in the team competition and 43rd individually.

=== World Championships ===
- 1986, Aachen: with Kaoua – 12th in the team competition and 36th individually.
- 1990, Stockholm: with Elegast – 26th individually.
- 1994, The Hague: with Palestro – 12th in the team competition and 60th individually.
- 1998, Rome: with Golan – 15th in the team competition and 79th individually.

=== European Championships ===
- 1989, Rotterdam: with Buenos Aires – 24th individually.
- 1991, La Baule: with Elegast – 6th in the team competition and 24th individually.
- 2003, Donaueschingen: with Delon VA – 13th in the team competition and 17th individually.
