= José Rafael de Silva Fernández de Híjar, 12th Duke of Híjar =

Spanish noble

José Rafael de Silva Fernández de Híjar y Palafox Duke of Híjar
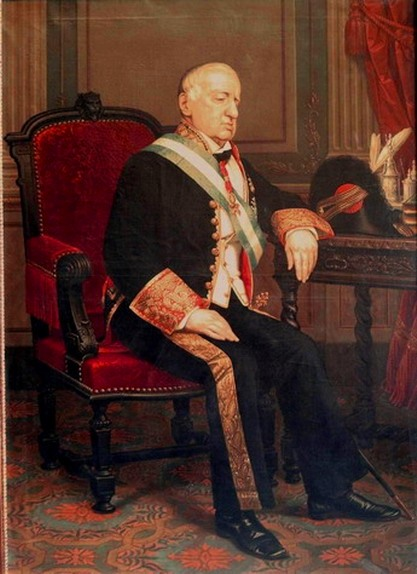
- Portrait of the Duke of Híjar, by Bernardino Montañés, c. 1863–1870.
- Born: 29 March 1776; Madrid, Spain
- Died: 16 September 1863 (aged 87); Madrid, Spain
- Spouse: Juana Nepomucena Fernández de Córdoba Villarroel Spínola y la Cerda (m. 1801; died 1813)
- Children: 3
- Parent(s): Pedro de Alcántara Fernández de Híjar y Abarca de Bolea, 9th Duke of Híjar; Rafaela de Palafox y Croy d'Havré
- Awards: Grand Cross of the Order of Charles III; Order of Santiago

José Rafael de Silva Fernández de Híjar y Palafox, 12th Duke of Híjar (29 March 1776 – 16 September 1863), was a Spanish peer who was a director of the Prado Museum between 1826 and 1838, and Sumiller de Corps between 1824 and 1854.

== Early life ==
José Rafael was born in Madrid on 29 March 1776. He was the second son of Pedro de Alcántara Fernández de Híjar y Abarca de Bolea, 9th Duke of Híjar and Rafaela de Palafox y Croy d'Havré.

He unexpectedly became Duke of Híjar in 1818 when his elder brother, Agustín Pedro Fadrique, 10th Duke of Híjar, died in 1817 and his brother's only daughter, Francisca Javiera, 11th Duchess of Híjar, died in 1818. He also inherited the titles of Duke of Lécera, Almazán and Bourneville, as well as Count-Duke of Aliaga, Marquess of Ornani, Almenara and Torres, and Count of Belchite, Salinas, Ribadeo and Aranda.

== Career ==
He was a Senator, a Knight in the Order of the Golden Fleece and the Order of Santiago. He fought against the French and reached the rank of Lieutenant general.

In 1824, King Ferdinand VII of Spain made him Sumiller de Corps and in 1826, he became Director of the Prado Museum. During his period as director, the museum acquired the Christ Crucified by Velázquez, and the collection of María Teresa de Borbón, 15th Countess of Chinchón. He kept the museum's collection together in the uncertain times following the death of King Ferdinand VII of Spain.

== Personal life ==
In 1801, he married Juana Nepomucena Fernández de Córdoba Villarroel Spínola y la Cerda (1785–1813), 8th Countess of Salvatierra, and had three children:

- Cayetano de Silva y Fernández de Córdoba, 13th Duke of Híjar (1805–1865), who married María de la Soledad Bernuy y Valda, a daughter of the Count of Montealegre.
- Andrés Avelino de Silva y Fernández de Córdoba, 13th Duke of Aliaga (1806–1885), who married Mary Caroline Campbell, a daughter of William Johnston Campbell and, in 1843. Mary was a granddaughter of Lt.-Gen. Colin Campbell and niece of Sir Guy Campbell, 1st Baronet.
- María Antonia de Silva y Fernández de Córdoba (b. 1808).

The Duke of Híjar died in Madrid in 16 September 1863.

=== Descendants ===
Through his eldest son Cayetano, he was a grandfather of Agustín de Silva y Bernuy, 14th Duke of Híjar. As the 14th Duke died without issue, he was succeeded in the family titles by his first cousin, Alfonso de Silva y Campbell, who became the 15th Duke of Híjar. The 15th Dukes father, who was still living, had renounced his right to the titles in favor of his first-born son.
