= Duke of Almazán =

Dukedom of Spain

Dukedom of Almazán
- Creation date: 1698
- Created by: Charles II
- Peerage: Peerage of Spain
- First holder: Bernardo Abarca de Bolea y Ornes, 1st Duke of Almazán
- Present holder: Natalia Ruth Mariátegui y Muro, 13th Duchess of Almazán

Duke of Almazán (Spanish: Duque de Almazán) is a title of Spanish nobility that is accompanied by the dignity of Grandee of Spain. It was granted to Bernardo Abarca de Bolea y Ornes in 1698 by King Charles II.

== Dukes of Almazán (1698) ==
- Bernardo Abarca de Bolea y Ornes, 1st Duchess of Almazán
- Buenaventura Pedro de Alcántara Abarca de Bolea y Bermúdez De Castro, 2nd Duke of Almazán
- Pedro Pablo Abarca de Bolea y Pons de Mendoza, 3rd Duke of Almazán
- Pedro de Alcántara De Silva Fernández de Híjar y Abarca de Bolea, 4th Duke of Almazán
- Agustín Pedro De Silva y Palafox, 5th Duke of Almazán
- Francisca Javiera de Silva y Fitz-James Stuart, 6th Duchess of Almazán
- José Rafael de Silva y Fernández de Híjar Portugal y Palafox, 7th Duke of Almazán
- Cayetano De Silva y Fernández de Córdoba, 8th Duke of Almazán
- Agustín De Silva y Bernuy, 9th Duke of Almazán
- Alfonso de Silva y Campbell, 10th Duke of Almazán
- María Araceli De Silva y Fernández de Córdoba, 11th Duchess of Almazán
- María del Rosario Mariátegui y Silva, 12th Duchess of Almazán
- Natalia Ruth Mariátegui y Muro, 13th Duchess of Almazán

== See also ==
- List of dukes in the peerage of Spain
- List of current grandees of Spain
