= Juan Francisco Fernández de Hijar =

Spanish noble

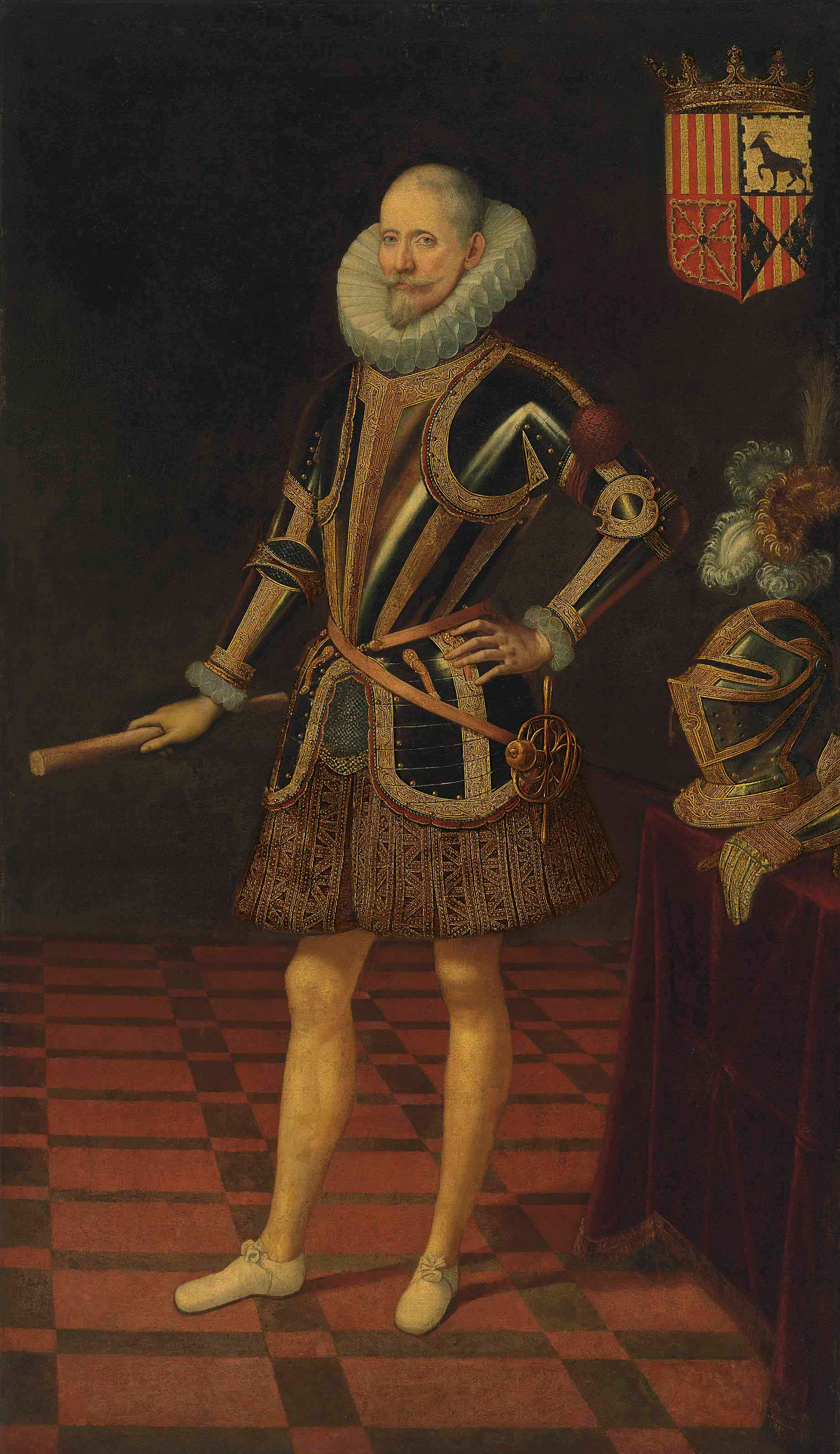
Portrait of the 4th Duke of Hijar, by Juan Pantoja de la Cruz, between 1599 and 1608

Juan Francisco Cristóbal Fernández de Hijar y Heredia, 4th Duke of Híjar (c. 6 October 1552 – 13 April 1614) was a Spanish noble of the House of Híjar.

== Early life ==
He was the son of Juan Cristóbal Fernández de Híjar and Isabel de Espés. His sister, Rafaela de Hijar, married Pedro de Aragón y Gurrea, Lord of Ballobar.

His paternal grandparents were Juan Luis Fernández de Híjar y Ramírez de Arellano, 3rd Duke of Híjar, and Hipólita Fernández de Heredia y Cuevas.

== Career ==
Upon the death of his grandfather in 1554, the two year old Juan Francisco became the 3rd Duke of Híjar, however, the title wasn't recognized until 1599.

== Personal life ==
He was twice married. Ana de la Cerda y Mendoza, 2nd Countess of Galve, a daughter of Baltasar de Mendoza y de la Cerda, 1st Count of Galve and Gerónima de Mendoza. Together, they were the parents of:

- Doña Gerónima de Híjar y la Cerda, 4th Countess of Galve (1590–1611), who married Ruy Gómez de Silva y Mendoza, 1st Marquess of Eliseda.
- Don Martín Fernández de Híjar y de la Cerda, 6th Count of Belchite, 3rd Count of Galve (d. 1610), who married Francisca de Luna y Arellano, a daughter of Miguel Martínez de Luna y Mendoza, 2nd Count of Morata de Jalón, the Viceroy of Aragón.

He married, secondly, to Francisca de Castro y Pinós y Zurita, 3rd Countess of Vallfogona, 2nd Countess of Guimerá (d. 1663). She was the daughter of Pedro Galcerán de Castro y Pinós y Fenollet, Viscount of Illa, Viscount of Canet, and Petronila de Zurita Castro y Peramola, Lady of the Barony of Zurita. Before his death in 1614, they were the parents of:

- Doña Isabel Margarita Fernández de Hijar y Castro Pinós, 5th Duchess of Hijar (1603–1642), who married Rodrigo de Silva Mendoza y Sarmiento, 2nd Marquess of Alenquer.
- Doña María Estefanía Fernández de Hijar, 5th Countess of Belchite (d. 1620), who died unmarried.

Both children from his first marriage predeceased Juan Francisco. The Duke died on 13 April 1614 and was succeeded by his eldest daughter from his second marriage, Doña Isabel. His widow died in 1663.
