= Duke of Aliaga =

Dukedom of Spain

Dukedom of Aliaga
- Creation date: 10 October 1487
- Created by: Ferdinand II
- Peerage: Peerage of Spain
- First holder: Juan Fernández de Híjar y Cabrera, 1st Duke of Aliaga
- Present holder: Luis Martínez de Irujo y Hohenlohe-Langenburg, 19th Duke of Aliaga

Duke of Aliaga (Spanish: Duque de Aliaga) is a hereditary title in the Peerage of Spain, accompanied by the dignity of Grandee and granted in 1487 by Ferdinand II to Juan Fernández de Híjar, Count of Aliaga, Duke of Híjar and later also Duke of Lécera.

It is one of the highest titles of Spanish nobility associated with one of the members of the Grandes de España. The title was created in 1487 by King Ferdinand II of Aragón (el Catolico) who raised the County of Aliaga to the status of a Dukedom. The title was created as a favor to Juan Fernández de Híjar y Cabrera who had been previously appointed as Count of Aliaga on 31 December 1461 by Ferdinand's father, John II of Aragon.

Aliaga is a municipality in the Province of Teruel, Aragon.

The title of Count of Aliaga, along with a title of lordship over Castellote, was granted to Juan Fernández by John II as a compensation and restitution bonus after peace was made in a war for power between Carlos de Viana, King John II's son and the king. Juan Fernández had fought on the side of the king's illegitimate son.

Juan Fernández de Híjar y Cabrera was the son of Juan Fernández de Híjar, the fifth Baron of Hijar and first lord of Lécera (title which he purchased). His mother was Juan Fernandez' second wife, Timbor de Cabrera, daughter of Bernardo de Cabrera, first Count of Módica, XXIV Viscount of Cabrera, XXVI Viscount of Bas, and II Viscount of Osuna.

The title over the Dukedom of Aliaga has been carried consistently for almost five centuries, having been almost 400 years under the control of the House of Híjar. As such, the Dukedom of Híjar and the Dukedom of Lécera have also traditionally been associated with title over Aliaga. These titles were separated after the reign of 12th Duke, José Rafael de Silva y Fernández de Híjar in 1863 who became the last Híjar to hold the title.

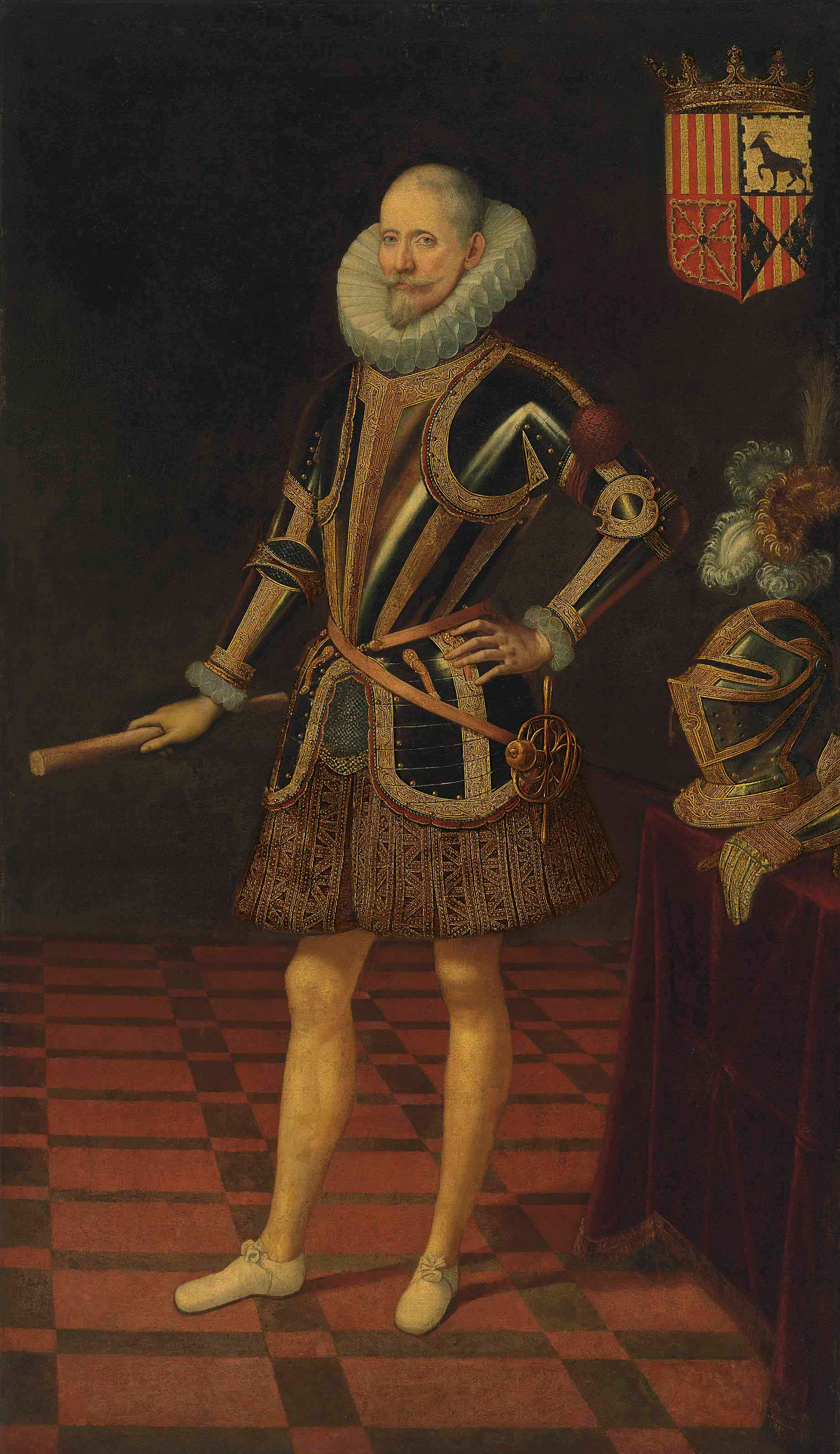
The 3rd Duke of Aliaga by Juan Pantoja de la Cruz

== Dukes of Aliaga (1487) ==
	Title	Period
Created by Ferdinand II of Aragon
I	Juan Fernández de Híjar y Cabrera	1487–1493
II	Luis Fernández de Híjar y Curton	1493–1517
III	Juan Francisco Fernández de Híjar	1517–1614
IV	Isabel Margarita Fernández de Híjar y Castro-Pinós	1620–1642
V	Jaime Francisco Sarmiento de Silva	1642–1700
VI	Juana Petronila de Silva y Aragón	1700–1710
VII	Isidro Francisco Fernández de Córdoba y Portugal Silva	1710–1745
VIII	Joaquín Diego de Silva y Moncada	1745–1758
IX	Pedro de Alcántara Fernández de Híjar y Abarca de Bolea	1758–1797
X	Agustín Pedro de Silva y Palafox	1797–1817
XI	Francisca Javiera de Silva y Fitz-James Stuart	1817–1818
XII	José Rafael Fernández de Híjar	1818–1863
XIII	Andrés Avelino de Silva y Fernández de Córdoba	1863–1885
XIV	Alfonso de Silva y Campbell	1885-1898
XV	Alfonso de Silva y Fernández de Córdoba	1898-1954
XVI	Alfonso Martínez de Irujo y Fitz-James Stuart	1954-2015
XVII	Luis Martínez de Irujo y Hohenlohe-Langenburg	2015-actual title holder

== Sources ==
- Instituto Luis de Salazar y Castro (2011). Elenco de Grandezas y Títulos Nobiliarios Españoles (in Spanish). Madrid: Ediciones de la Revista Hidalguía.
