= Rodrigo de Silva Mendoza y Sarmiento =

Spanish nobleman

Rodrigo de Silva Mendoza y Sarmiento (Madrid, 1600 – León, 1664), was 2nd Marqués of Alanquer, 2nd Count of Salinas, and Duke-consort of Híjar, through his marriage with the 4th Duchess of Híjar, Isabel Fernández of Híjar. He plotted in 1648 to become King of Aragon and died in prison.

== Biography ==
He was the son of Diego de Silva y Mendoza, Viceroy of Portugal and Mariana Sarmiento de Villandrando de la Cerda. His paternal grandparents were Ruy Gómez de Silva, 1st Prince of Éboli and Ana de Mendoza.
He married in October 1622 with Isabel Fernández of Híjar, daughter of Juan Francisco Fernández de Hijar.

Despite being an adversary of Olivares, he received in 1640 a military command in the War against Portugal. He had the ambition to succeed Olivares as Valido and plotted against his successor Luis de Haro.

He prepared with Carlos de Padilla, a cavalry commander, a military coup to overthrow the King and to proclaim himself King of Aragon.
But Padilla was captured and tortured in the summer of 1648. Soon the Duke of Híjar was also imprisoned and tortured but he did not confess. Because of this, he was condemned to life imprisonment in the Castle of León, while Padilla and Domingo Cabral were executed.

Híjar died in prison, which seems harsh compared to the lenient sentence given to Gaspar Alfonso Pérez de Guzmán, 9th Duke of Medina Sidonia in 1641 for his part in the Andalusian independentist conspiracy (1641).

=== Marriage and children ===
His marriage to Isabel Fernández of Híjar produced 4 children :

- Jaime Francisco Víctor (1625–1700), 5th Duke of Híjar, Golden Fleece, married Mariana Pignatelli d'Aragona. Had issue.
- Ruy Gómez (1627–1680), 3rd Marqués of Alanquer, never married.
- Diego (1628–?)
- Teresa (1631–1664), married Juan Manuel de Zúñiga y Mendoza, 9th Duke of Béjar. Had issue.
