= Jaime de Berenguer =

Spanish politician

Member of the Assembly of Madrid
- Incumbent
- Assumed office 2011

Personal details
- Born: Jaime María de Berenguer de Santiago; 25 October 1967 (age 58)
- Party: Vox (2016-); Union, Progress and Democracy (2011-2016)
- Education: Autonomous University of Madrid

Jaime María de Berenguer de Santiago (born 25 October 1967) is a Spanish politician and nobleman who has been a member of the Assembly of Madrid since 2011. He is a member of the House of Silva and holds the title of the 21st Count of Cifuentes.

== Biography ==
de Berenguer was born in Madrid to a Spanish noble family and is a descendant of Ramon Berenguer IV, Count of Barcelona. He is the son of Juan de Berenguer y Casani, 5th Count of Cifuentes.

He graduated with a PhD in psychology at the Autonomous University of Madrid (UAM) in 1998 with a published thesis Attitudes and environmental beliefs: a psychosocial explanation of ecological behavior. He subsequently worked as a professor at the UAM.

He first entered politics in 2011 in which he was elected as a city councilor in Madrid on the list for the Union, Progress and Democracy party. In 2016, he switched his support to the nationalist Vox party and won a seat in the Assembly of Madrid elections of 2019.
