= Castle of Barcience =

- Castillo de Barcience
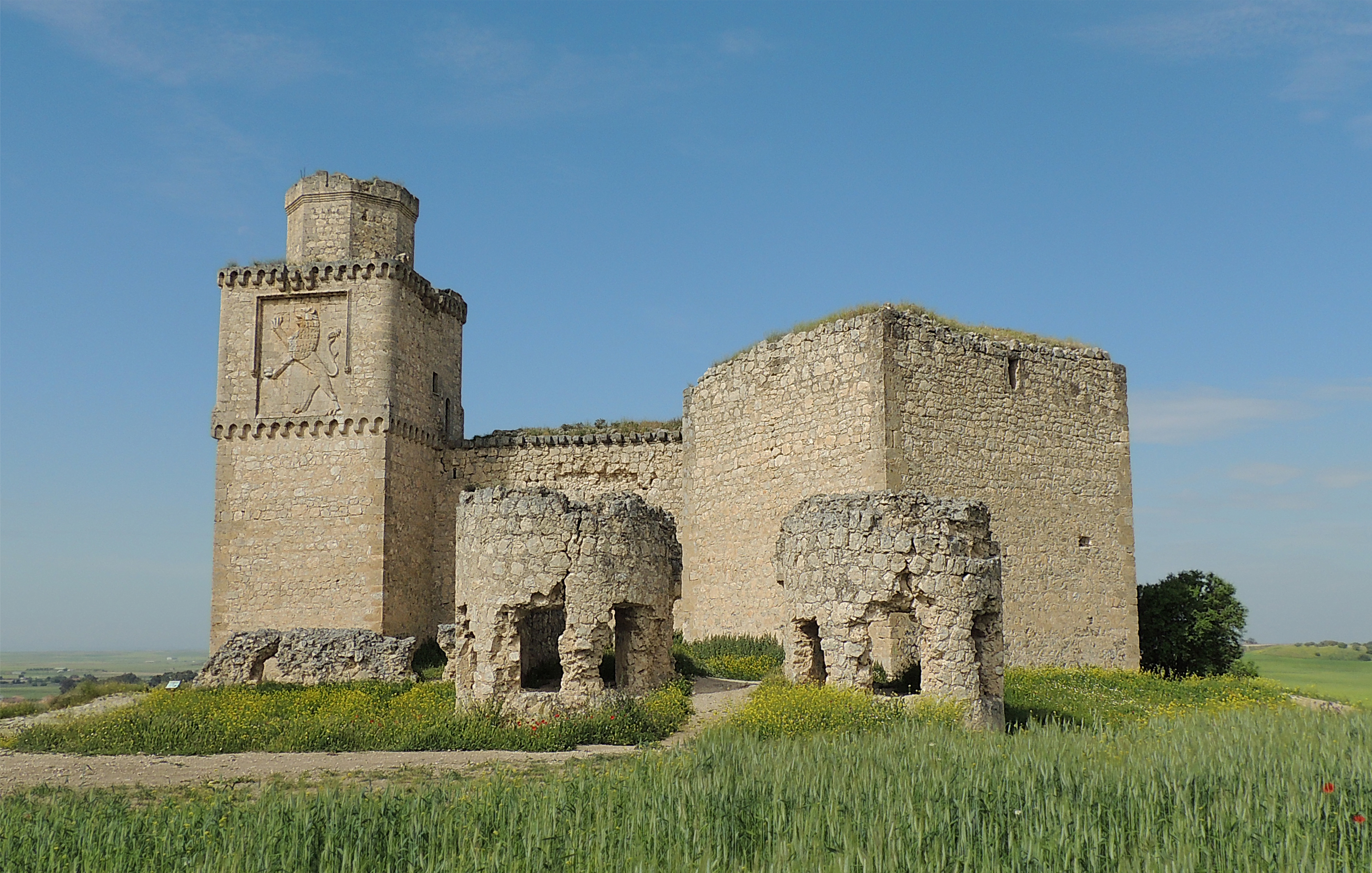
- Interactive map of the Castle of Barcience area

General information
- Type: Castle
- Location: Barcience, Spain
- Coordinates: 39°59′23″N 4°13′47″W
- Owner: Private property

The Castle of Barcience is castle in Barcience, Spain. It was a stronghold of the House of Silva.

== History and description ==
It was built from scratch in the 15th century. Erected on a small elevation of the terrain, it consists of a ortogonal main body, with two circular towers in the Western corners and two square towers in the Eastern corners, with the NE one being the largest one. One of the towers displays a relief depicting a lion rampant, the sigil of the house of Silva.

Despite the status of Bien de Interés Cultural via the generic 1949 decree on the protection of the castles of Spain, the building has been however left in a situation of complete abandonment by the owners, losing pieces of the structure and enduring graffiti.
