= Bernardino Montañés =

Aragonese painter

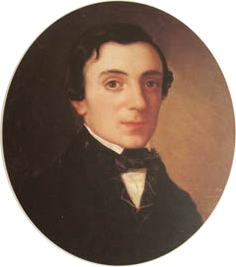
- Born: 20 May 1825; Zaragoza, Spain
- Died: 6 January 1893 (aged 67); Zaragoza, Spain
- Education: Real Academia de Nobles y Bellas Artes de San Luis; Real Academia de Bellas Artes de San Fernando
- Movement: Romanticism

Bernardino Montañés y Perez (20 May 1825 – 6 January 1893) was an Aragonese painter.

== Early life ==
Montañés was born in Zaragoza on 20 May 1825.

== Career ==
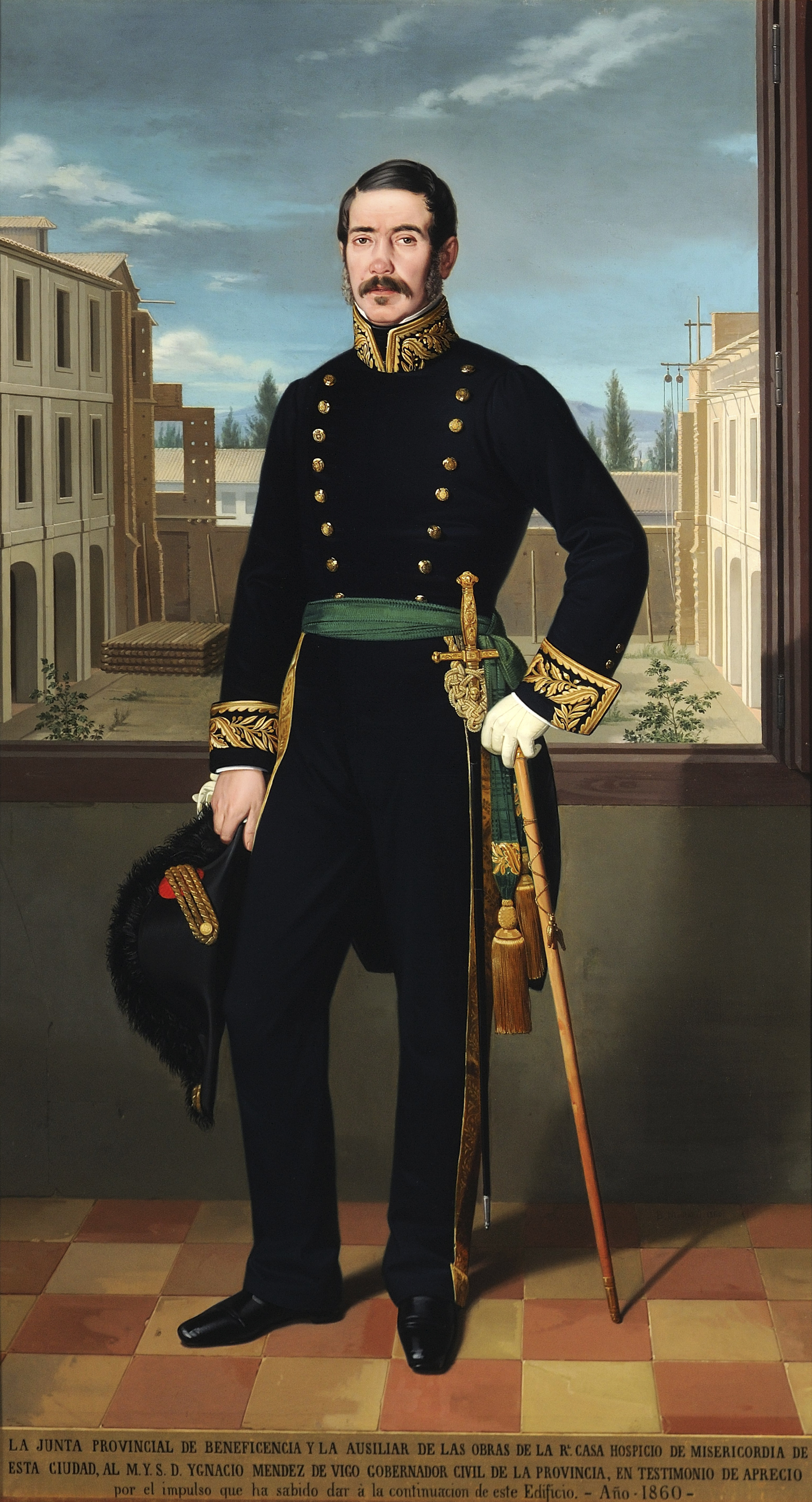
Portrait of Ignacio Méndez de Vigo y Valdés Miranda, 1860

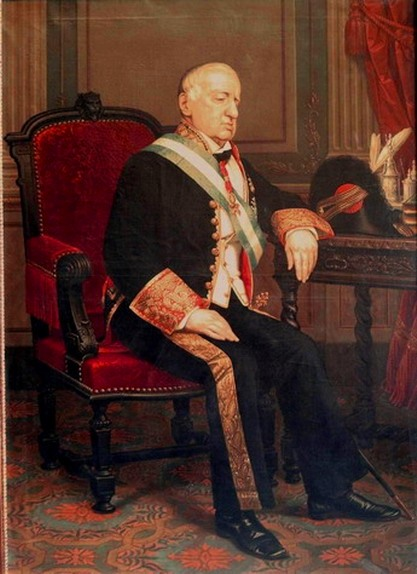
Portrait of José Rafael de Silva Fernández de Híjar, 12th Duke of Híjar, between c. 1863 and c. 1870

His began studying art at the School of Fine Arts in Zaragoza and, later, at the Real Academia de Bellas Artes de San Fernando in Madrid. In 1848, the government of Isabella II granted him a scholarship to complete his artistic training in Rome from 1848 to 1852. While in Rome, he became friends with fellow artists Felipe Moratilla, Carlos Múgica, Francisco Lameyer, Francisco Jareño, Patricio Patiño and Miguel Floyxench. In the 1850s he traveled to Italy, Austria, Bavaria, Saxony, Prussia, Belgium and France. Upon his return to Spain, he became an assistant drawing teacher at the Madrid Academy, until becoming full professor in 1859 and director in 1886. He also served as curator of the Zaragoza Museum for several years.

=== Artistic style ===
Montañés' work has been considered eclectic, combining elements of neoclassicism and rococo. He was highly sought after by Aragonese society and most of his artistic output was portraits and religious paintings.

An important aspect of his work was developed around 1872, when the Cathedral of Our Lady of the Pillar was completed. Montañés was asked to paint some pictures of the main dome, and ended up painting around six. Among these stands out is Coronation of the Virgin.

Today, his work can be found in the Real Academia de Bellas Artes de San Fernando and Prado Museum, both in Madrid, and in the collection of the Provincial Deputation of Zaragoza.

=== Paintings in the Prado Museum ===
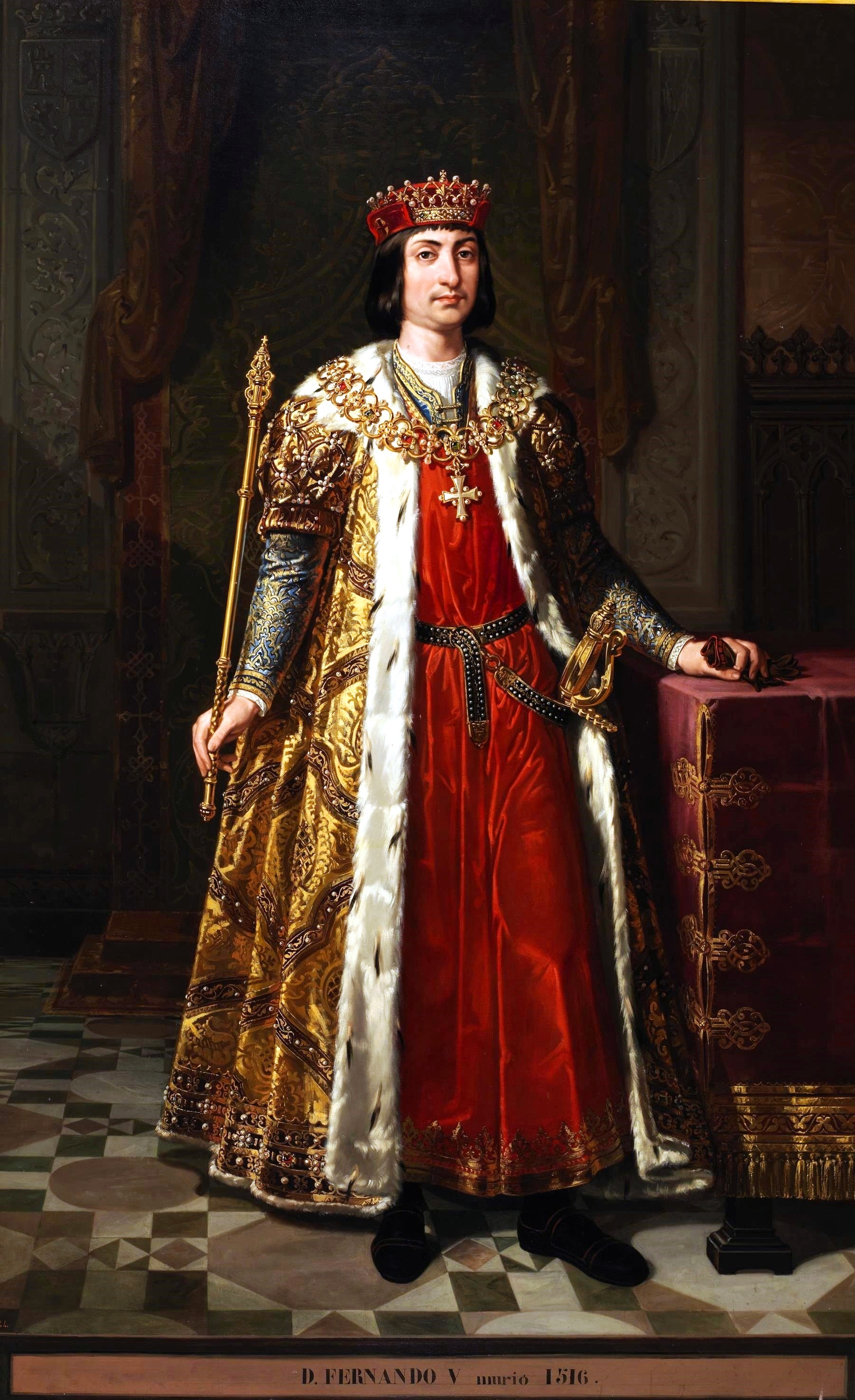
Ferdinand II of Aragon, c. 1848

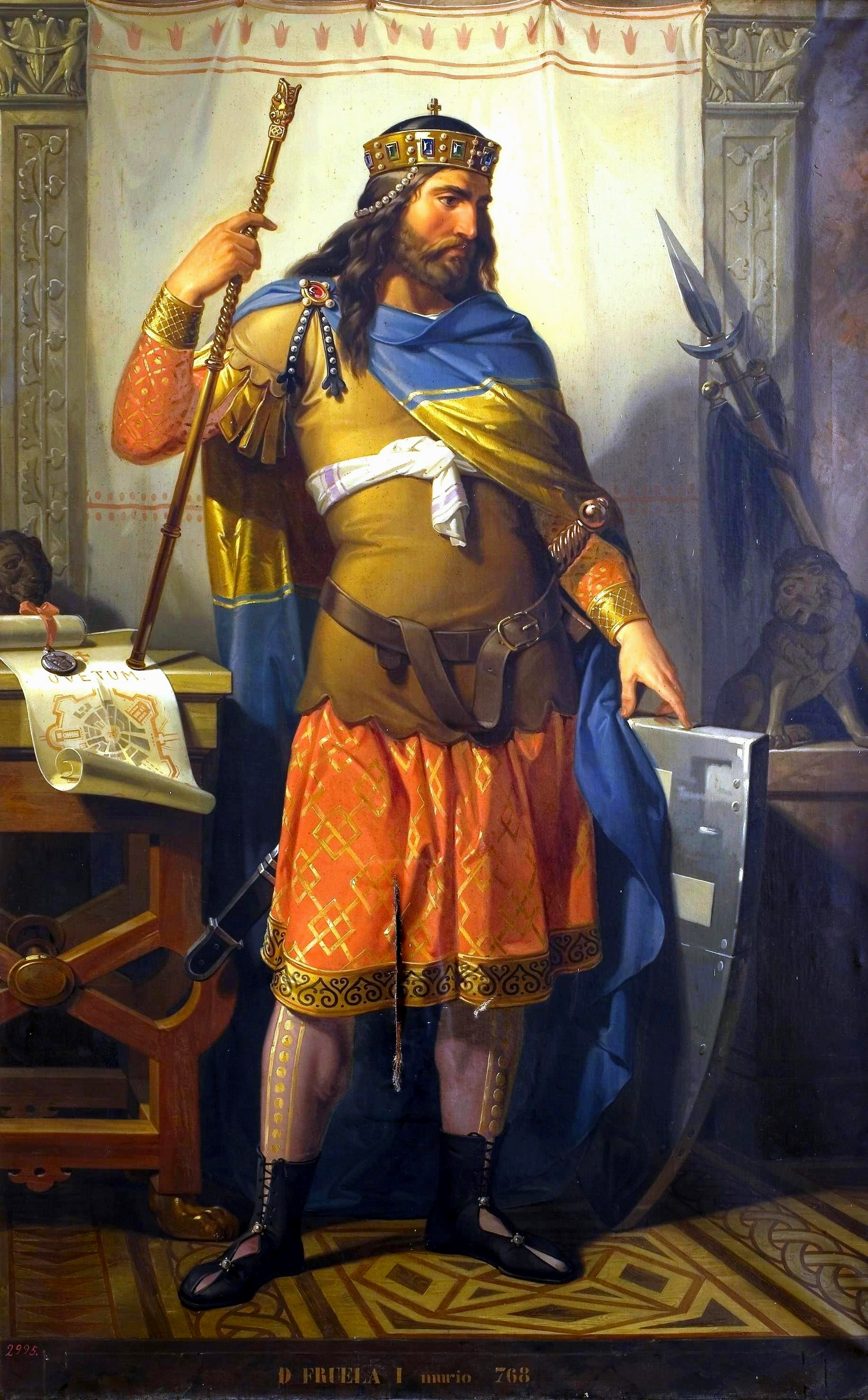
Fruela I of Asturias, 1854

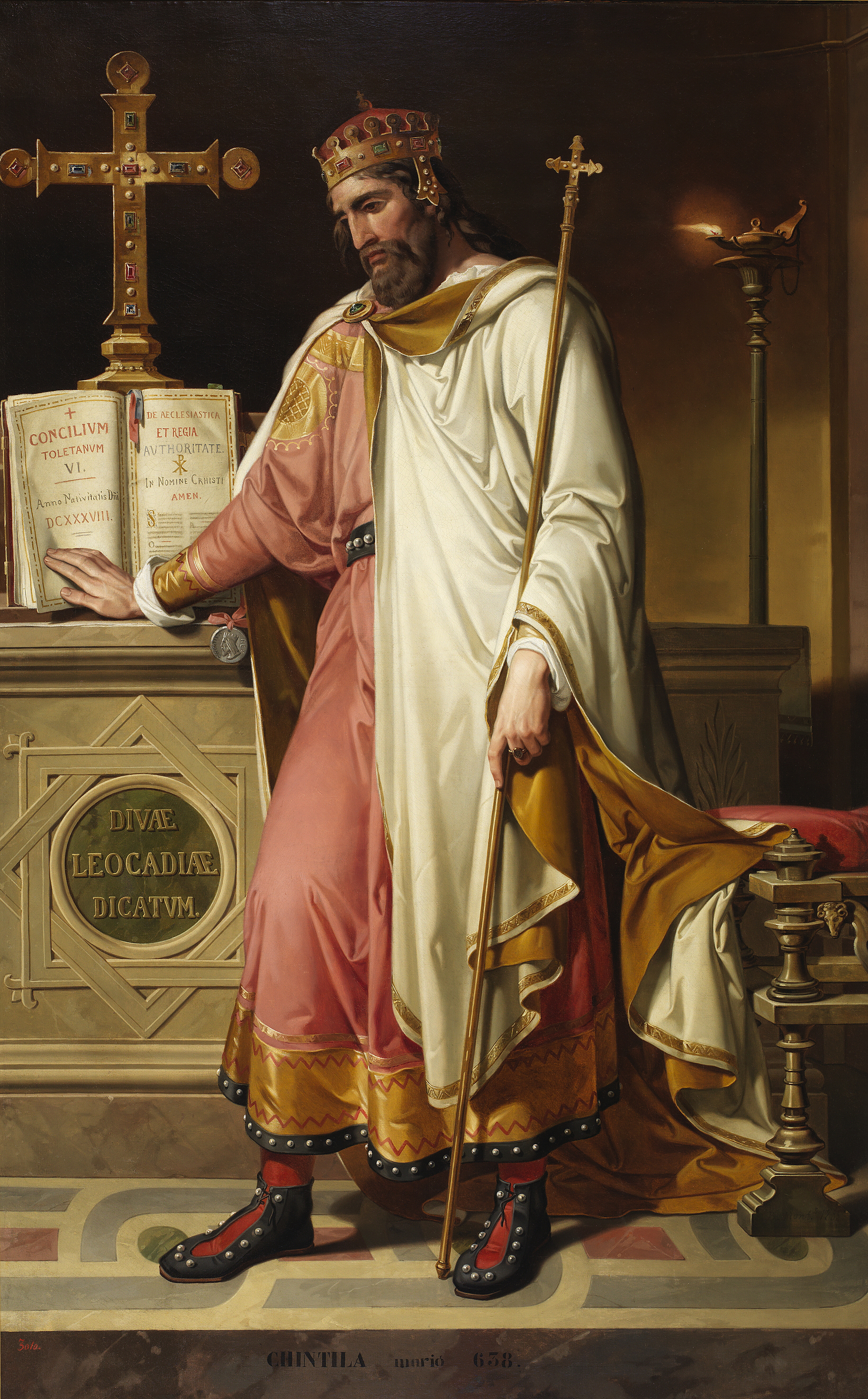
Gothic king Chintila, 1855

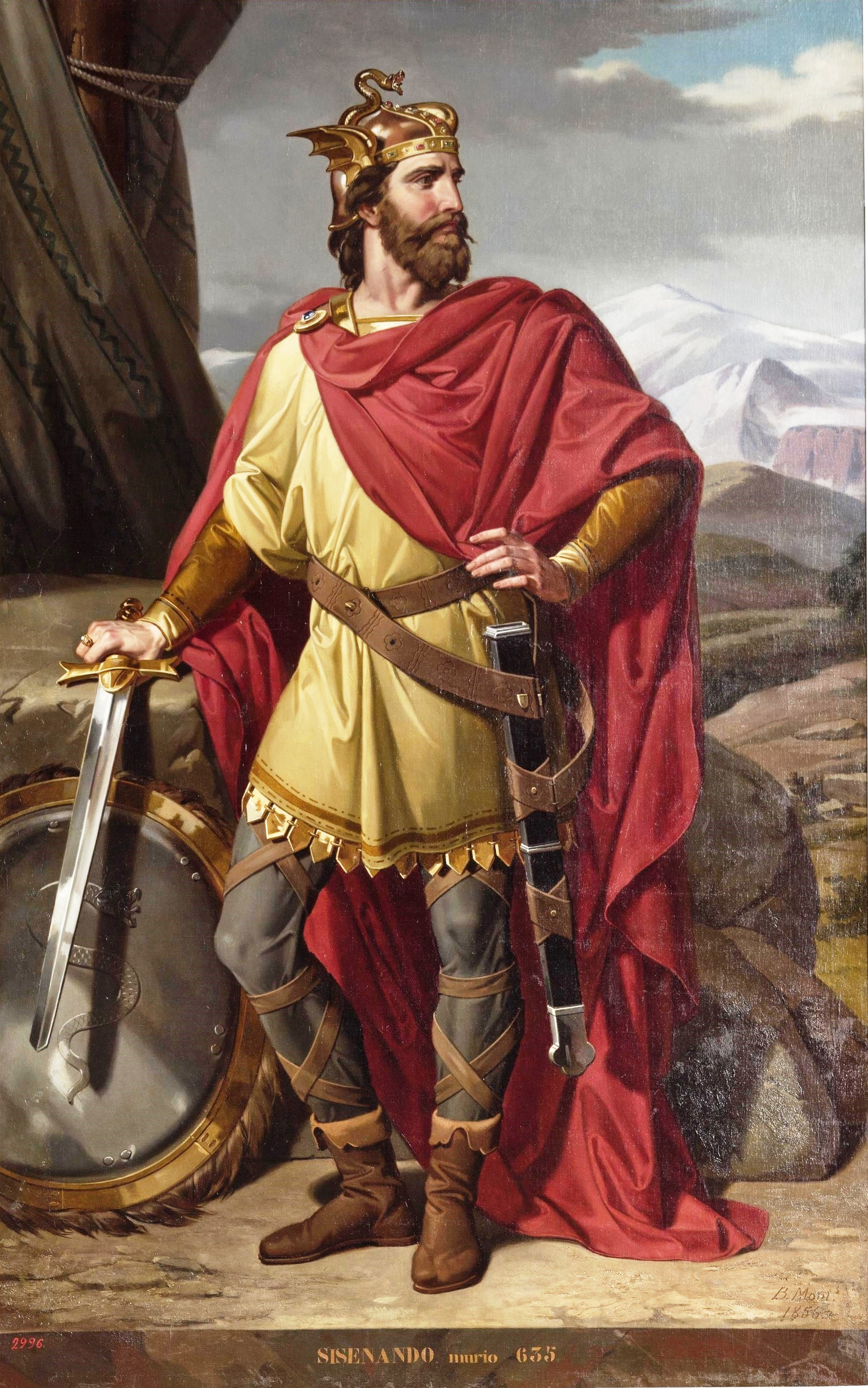
Sisenand, King of the Visigoths, 1856

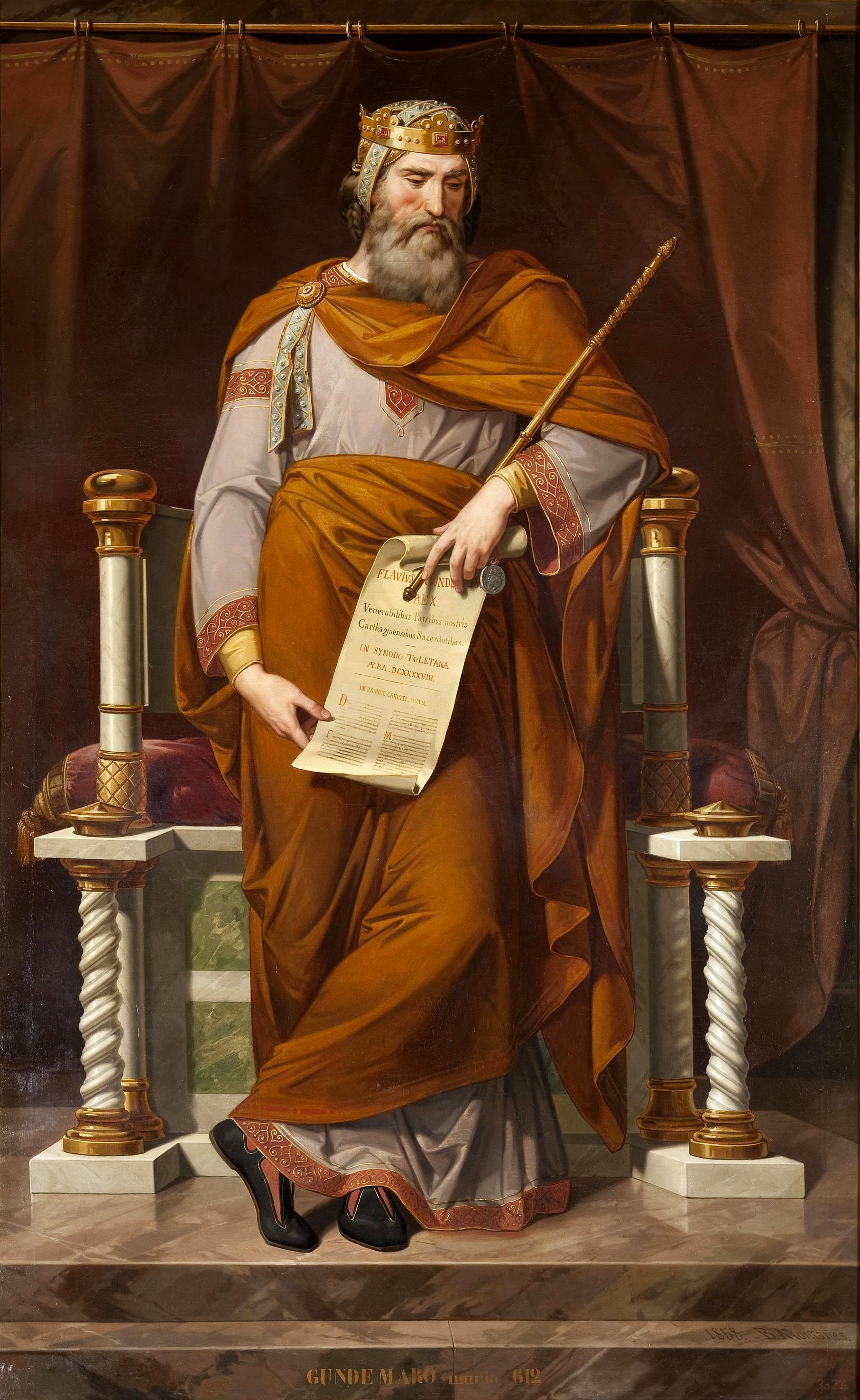
Gundemar, King of the Visigoths, 1858

== Personal life ==
Montañés died on 6 January 1893.
