= Count of Salvatierra =

Hereditary title in the Peerage of Spain

Countship of Salvatierra
- Creation date: 20 February 1613
- Created by: Philip III
- Peerage: Peerage of Spain
- First holder: Diego Sarmiento de Sotomayor y Mendoza, 1st Count of Salvatierra
- Present holder: Cayetano Martínez de Irujo y Fitz-James Stuart, 14th Count of Salvatierra
- Heir apparent: Luis Martínez de Irujo y Casanova

Count of Salvatierra (Spanish: Conde de Salvatierra) is a hereditary title in the Peerage of Spain, accompanied by the dignity of Grandee and granted in 1613 by Philip III to Diego Sarmiento de Sotomayor, Lord of Salvaterra and of the Castle of Sobroso.

The title's name refers to the municipality of Salvaterra de Miño in Galicia, Spain.

== Counts of Salvatierra (1613) ==
- Diego Sarmiento de Sotomayor y Mendoza, 1st Count of Salvatierra
- García Sarmiento de Sotomayor y Luna, 2nd Count of Salvatierra
- Diego Sarmiento de Sotomayor y Luna, 3rd Count of Salvatierra
- José Salvador Sarmiento de Sotomayor e Isasi, 4th Count of Salvatierra
- José Francisco Sarmiento de Sotomayor y Velasco, 5th Count of Salvatierra
- Ana Sarmiento de Sotomayor y Córdoba, 6th Countess of Salvatierra
- José María Fernández de Córdoba y Sarmiento de Sotomayor, 7th Count of Salvatierra
- Juana Nepomucena Fernández de Córdoba y Villaroel, 8th Countess of Salvatierra
- Agustín de Silva y Bernuy, 9th Count of Salvatierra
- Andrés Avelino de Silva y Fernández de Córdoba, 10th Count of Salvatierra
- Alfonso de Silva y Campbell, 11th Count of Salvatierra
- Alfonso de Silva y Fernández de Córdoba, 12th Count of Salvatierra
- Cayetana Fitz-James Stuart y Silva, 13th Countess of Salvatierra
- Cayetano Martínez de Irujo y Fitz-James Stuart, 14th Count of Salvatierra

== See also ==
- Duke of Arjona
- List of current grandees of Spain
