= Duke of Híjar =

Hereditary title in the Peerage of Spain, accompanied by the dignity of Grandee

Dukedom of Híjar
- Creation date: 16 April 1483
- Created by: Ferdinand II
- Peerage: Peerage of Spain
- First holder: Juan Fernández de Híjar y Cabrera, 1st Duke of Híjar
- Present holder: Alfonso Martínez de Irujo y Fitz-James Stuart, 18th Duke of Híjar
- Heir apparent: Luis Martínez de Irujo y Hohenlohe-Langenburg, 19th Duke of Aliaga

Duke of Híjar (Spanish: Duque de Híjar) is a hereditary title in the Peerage of Spain, accompanied by the dignity of Grandee and granted in 1483 by Ferdinand II to Juan Fernández de Híjar, Lord of Híjar (of the House of Fernández de Híjar), and later also Duke of Lécera and Aliaga.

== Dukes of Híjar (1483) ==
No.	Name	Years
1	Juan Fernández de Híjar y Cabrera	1483-1493
2	Luis Fernández de Híjar y Beaumont	1493-1517
3	Luis Fernández de Híjar y Ramírez de Arellano	1517-1554
4	Juan Francisco Fernández de Híjar y Fernández de Heredia	1599-1614
5	Isabel Margarita Fernández de Híjar y Castro-Pinós	1614-1642
6	Jaime Sarmiento de Silva y Fernández de Híjar	1642-1700
7	Juana Petronila Silva Fernández de Híjar y Pignatelli	1700-1710
8	Isidro Francisco Fernández de Híjar y Portugal Silva	1710-1749
9	Joaquín Diego de Silva y Moncada	1749-1758
10	Pedro de Alcántara Fernández de Híjar y Abarca de Bolea	1758-1808
11	Agustín Pedro de Silva-Fernández de Híjar y Palafox	1808-1817
12	María Francisca de Silva-Fernández de Híjar y Fitz-James-Stuart	1817-1818
13	José Rafael de Silva Fernández de Híjar y Palafox	1818-1863
14	Cayetano de Silva y Fernández de Córdoba	1863-1865
15	Agustín de Silva y Bernuy	1865-1872
16	Alfonso de Silva y Campbell	1872-1929
17	Alfonso de Silva y Fernández de Córdoba	1929-1956
18	Cayetana Fitz-James Stuart y de Silva	1956-2013
19	Alfonso Martínez de Irujo y Fitz-James Stuart	2013–present

== See also ==
- List of dukes in the peerage of Spain
- List of current grandees of Spain
