= Villarejo de Fuentes =

Municipality in Castilla–La Mancha, Spain

- Municipality
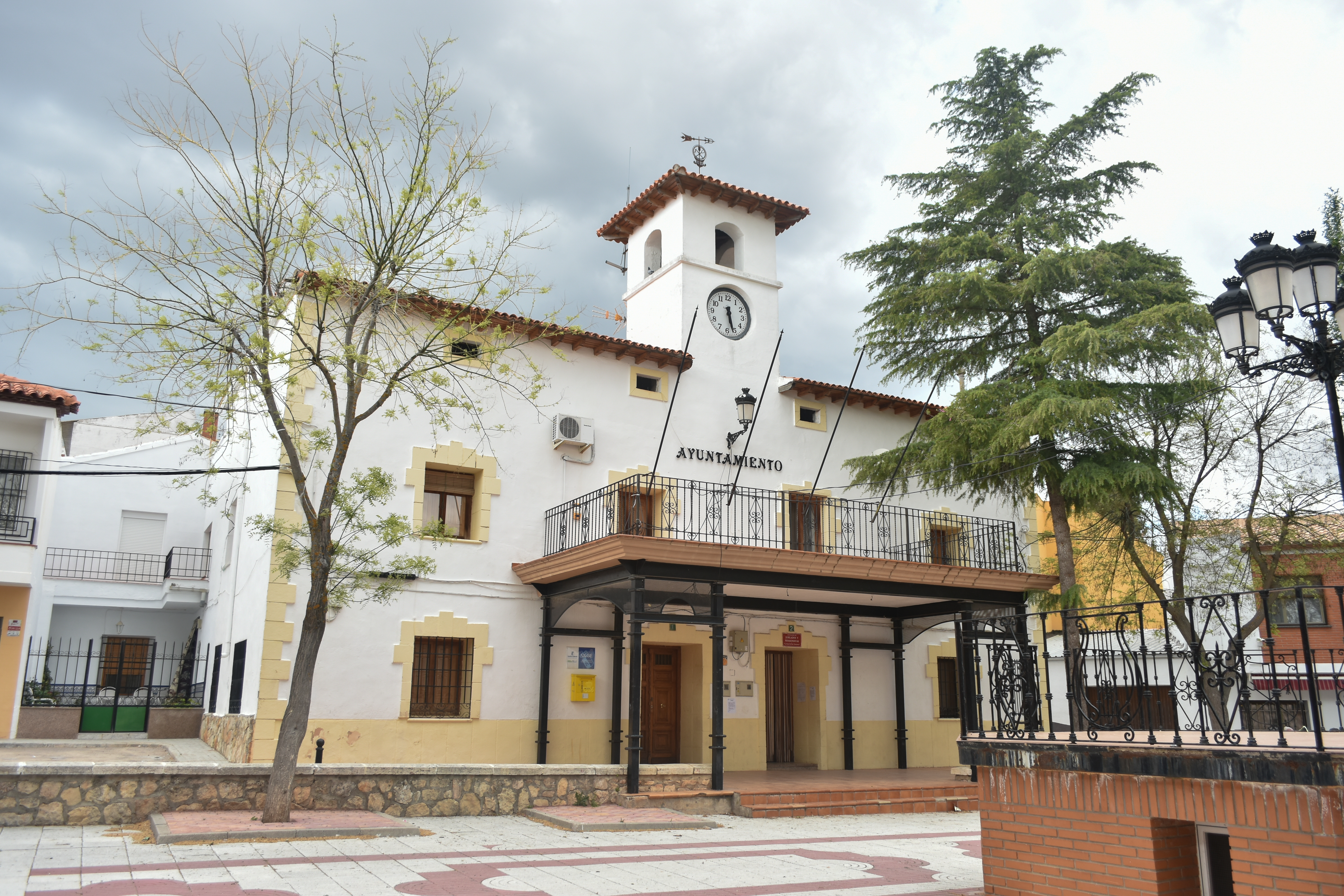

- Location within Castilla-La Mancha Location within Spain
- Coordinates: 39°47′N 2°41′W
- Country: Spain
- Autonomous community: Castilla–La Mancha
- Province: Cuenca
- Comarca: La Mancha de Cuenca

Government
  - Mayor: Carlos Asensio (PP)

Area
  - Total: 128.28 km^{2} (49.53 sq mi)

Population (2025-01-01)
  - Total: 387
  - Density: 3.02/km^{2} (7.81/sq mi)
- Time zone: UTC+1 (CET)
  - Summer (DST): UTC+2 (CEST)

Villarejo de Fuentes is a municipality located in the province of Cuenca, Castilla–La Mancha, Spain. According to the 2015 census (INE), the municipality has a population of 519 inhabitants.

== History ==
In its origins, Villarejo was given the name Fuentes. Located near the river Záncara, the original settlement was later abandoned because of an epidemic. During the Modern Era the municipality was part of the Marquesado de Villena, becoming one of the most important villages in the province.

== Demographics ==
By 1960 Villarejo had more than 2200 inhabitants. From around 1960 until today the village's population has dropped, as well as other surrounding areas, with most people emigrating to other Spanish regions such as Madrid, Valencia and Catalonia. Today less than 500 people live permanently in the village.

== Climate ==
Villarejo experiences a Mediterranean climate with continental characteristics, with mild to cold winters due to its altitude (862 MASL, 2828 feet), including sporadic snowfalls and minimum temperatures sometimes below freezing. Summers are warm to hot. Precipitation is concentrated in the autumn and spring.

== Economy ==
The village based its economy on agriculture, mostly wheat, olive and sunflowers, and sheep farming. As for industry, there is a cheese manufactures which has achieved several awards, including the World Cheese Awards (2007. 2008), Chincho de Oro (2008) and Concorso per i migliori formaggi (2012, 2015).

== Festivities ==
- Cristo de los Pastores (May–June, fifty days after Easter Sunday).
- Nuestra Señora de Fuentes (September, 8)
