= Duke of Lécera =

Dukedom of Spain

Dukedom of Lécera
- Creation date: 1493
- Created by: Ferdinand II
- Peerage: Peerage of Spain
- First holder: Juan Fernández de Híjar y Cabrera, 1st Duke of Lécera
- Present holder: María Leticia de Silva y Allende, 19th Duchess of Lécera

Duke of Lécera (Spanish: Duque de Lécera) is a hereditary title in the Peerage of Spain accompanied by the dignity of Grandee, granted in 1493 by Ferdinand II of Aragon to Juan Fernández de Híjar.

The title makes reference to the small town of Lécera in Zaragoza, Spain.

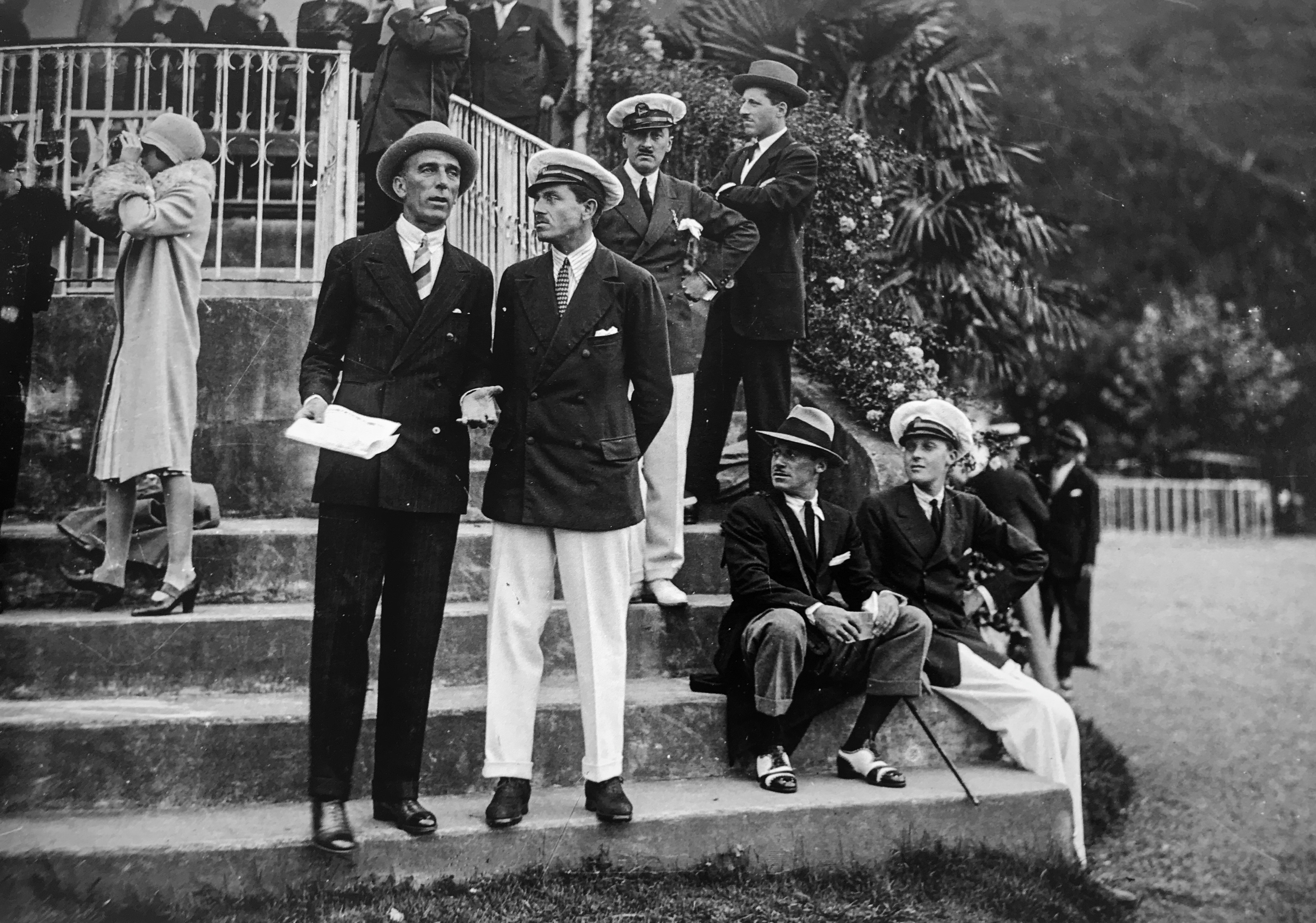
Standing in the foreground, the 16th Duke of Lécera in white trousers. Sitting, the 8th Count of Yebes and the Prince of Asturias respectively, San Sebastián, 1927

== Dukes of Lécera (1493) ==
- Juan Fernández de Híjar y Cabrera, 1st Duke of Lécera
- Luis Fernández de Híjar y Beaumont, 2nd Duke of Lécera
- Juan Francisco Fernández de Hijar, 3rd Duke of Lécera
- Isabel Margarita Fernández de Híjar y Castro-Pinós, 4th Duchess of Lécera
- Jaime Francisco Sarmiento de Silva, 5th Duke of Lécera
- Juana Petronila de Silva y Aragón, 6th Duchess of Lécera
- Isidro Francisco Fernández de Híjar y Silva, 7th Duke of Lécera
- Joaquín Diego de Silva y Moncada, 8th Duke of Lécera
- Pedro de Alcántara Fernández de Híjar y Abarca de Bolea, 9th Duke of Lécera
- Agustín Pedro de Silva y Palafox, 10th Duke of Lécera
- Francisca Javiera de Silva y Fitz-James Stuart, 11th Duchess of Lécera
- José Rafael de Silva Fernández de Híjar y Palafox, 12th Duke of Lécera
- Cayetano de Silva y Fernández de Córdoba, 13th Duke of Lécera
- Agustín de Silva y Bernuy, 14th Duke of Lécera
- Jaime de Silva y Campbell, 15th Duke of Lécera
- Jaime de Silva y Mitjans, 16th Duke of Lécera
- Jaime de Silva y Agrela, 17th Duke of Lécera
- Jaime de Silva y Mora, 18th Duke of Lécera
- Leticia de Silva y Allende, 19th Duchess of Lécera

== See also ==
- List of dukes in the peerage of Spain
- List of current grandees of Spain

== Bibliography ==
- Hidalgos de España, Real Asociación de (2018). Elenco de Grandezas y Títulos Nobiliarios Españoles. Ediciones Hidalguía. ISBN 978-84-94841-02-6.
