= Juan Fernández de Híjar y Cabrera =

Spanish noble (ca. 1419 - 1491)

Coat of arms of the House of Hijar, the traditional title holders over Aliaga

Juan Fernández de Híjar y Cabrera (ca. 1419 - 27 November 1491) was a Spanish noble of the House of Híjar. He was the son of Juan Fernández de Híjar, the fifth Baron of Hijar and first lord of Lécera (title which he purchased). His mother was Juan Fernandez' second wife, Timbor de Cabrera, daughter of Bernardo de Cabrera, first Count of Módica, XXIV Viscount of Cabrera, XXVI Viscount of Bas, and II Viscount of Osuna.

Juan Fernández was the first Count of Aliaga and Duke of Aliaga. The title of Count of Aliaga, along with a title of lordship over Castellote, was granted to Juan Fernández by John II of Aragon as a compensation and restitution bonus after peace was made in a war for power between Carlos de Viana, King John II's son and the king. Juan Fernández had fought on the side of the king's illegitimate son.

His title of Count of Aliaga was later upgraded by Ferdinand II of Aragon (El Catolico) to the status of Dukedom in 1487.
