= Agustín de Silva y Bernuy, 14th Duke of Híjar =

Spanish aristocrat

Agustín de Silva y Bernuy Fernández de Híjar, 14th Duke of Híjar GE (10 May 1826 – 16 May 1872) was a Spanish aristocrat.

== Early life ==
Agustín was born in Madrid on 10 May 1826. He was the only son of Cayetano de Silva y Fernández de Córdoba, 13th Duke of Híjar (1863–1865) and María de la Soledad Bernuy y Valda.

His paternal grandfather was José Rafael de Silva Fernández de Híjar, 12th Duke of Híjar. His uncle, Andrés Avelino de Silva y Fernández de Córdoba (1806–1885), was the Duke of Aliaga.

== Career ==
On 30 November 1866, he received the Grand Cross of the Order of Charles III from Queen Isabella II. In addition, he was authorized to officially assume all the noble titles that corresponded to him as head of the House of Híjar on December 5 1866. Besides the dukedom of Híjar, he was the 15th Duke of Aliaga y Castellot, 10th Duke of Bournonville, 8th Marquess of San Vicente del Barco, 15th Marquess of Almenara, 15th Count of Palma del Río, 15th Count of Aranda, 13th Count of Salvatierra, and 21st Count of Ribadeo.

== Personal life ==
He married Luisa Fernández de Córdoba y Pérez de Barradas (1827–1902), the youngest daughter of Francisco de Paula Fernández de Córdoba y Pacheco, 19th Count of La Puebla del Maestre and a lady-in-waiting to Isabella II.

He died, without issue, on 16 May 1872 and was succeeded in his titles by his first cousin, Alfonso de Silva y Campbell, (Note: The 15th Duke was the son of the 14th Duke's paternal uncle, Andrés Avelino de Silva y Fernández de Córdoba, and Mary Caroline Campbell (a daughter of William Johnston Campbell and niece of Sir Guy Campbell, 1st Baronet, and a granddaughter of Lt.-Gen. Colin Campbell and his wife Mary (née Johnston).) who became the 15th Duke of Híjar.
