= De Silva Fernández de Híjar Portugal family =

House of De Silva Fernández de Híjar Portugal
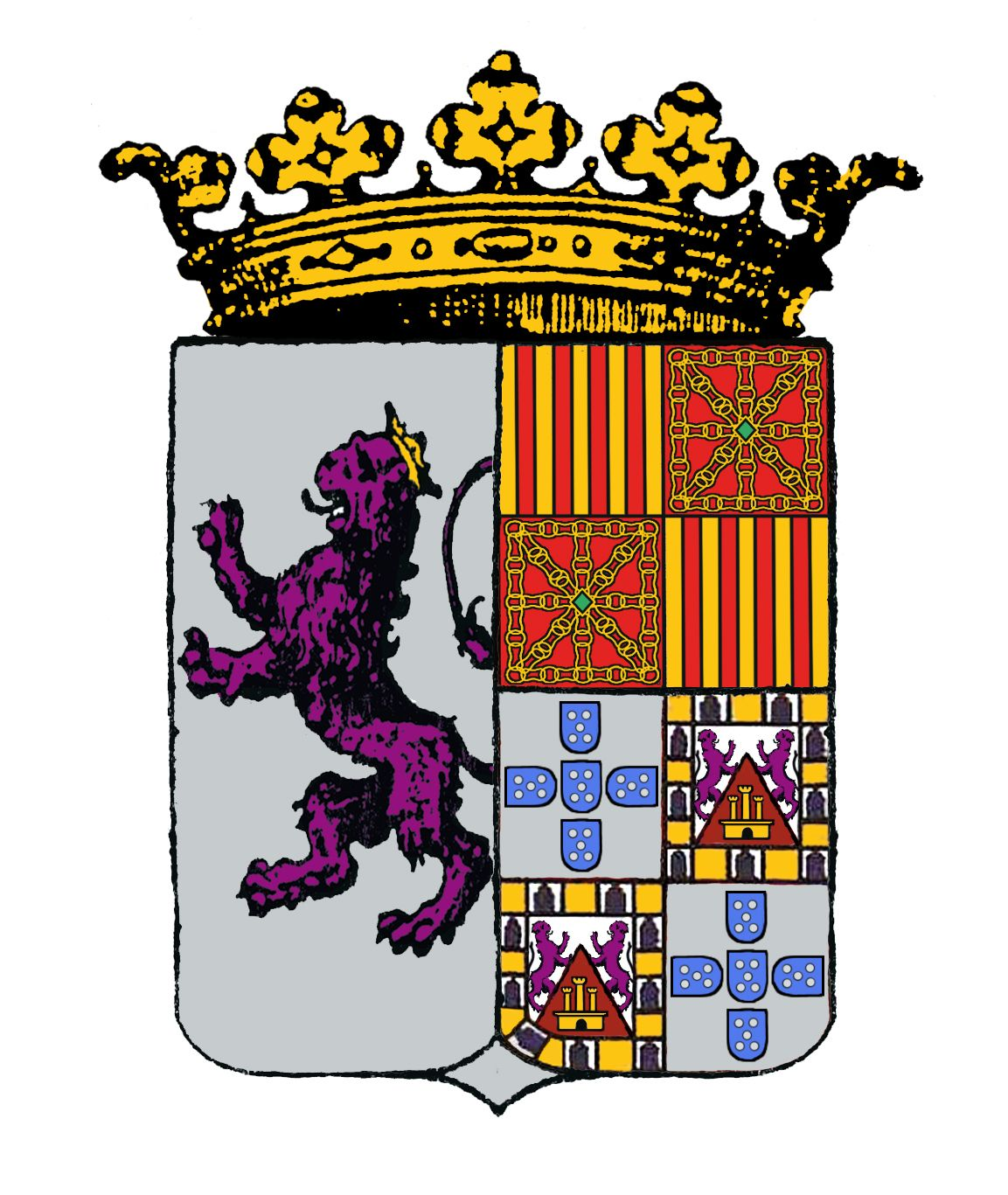
- No pose quien mal posa.
- Country: Spain, Portugal, Italy
- Founded: First hypothesis: 900 d.c.; second hypothesis: 1030 d.c.
- Founder: First hypothesis: Aznar Fruela, Infante de Leon; Second hypothesis: Gutierres Peláez de Silva (1030-1110).
- Current head: Alfonso Martinez de Irujo y Fitz-James Stuart
- Titles: Various
- Estates: of Portugal and Spain

The House (Casa) de Silva Fernández de Híjar (or Ixar) Portugal had its origin from the marriage ties of the house de Silva, with the house of Fernández de Ixar [from doña Isabel (1620–1700) descendant of don Pedro Fernández de Ixar (1245–1299), natural child of the king don Jaime I d'Aragon called "The Conqueror" and of doña Bereguela Fernández, granddaughter of don Alfonso IX de Leon, by matrilineal descent] and the House de Portugal [from doña Ana (1570–1629) (descendant from doña Isabel de Portugal (1364–1395) natural child of don Fernando I of Borgogna king of Portugal]. Marriage ties which created one of the most ancient, important, and richest families of Spain and Portugal (probably descendant from Visigothic kings). A family which has given a great number of Grandes of Spain, viceroys, famous military figures, politicians, statesmen, clergymen, saints, scholars, artists, architects; to the kingdom first and to the Spanish Empire later, to nowadays.

== History ==
In this house, inheritance took place by matrilineal descent thanks to the royal concession granted by Ferdinand the Catholic in 1483, to natural children, legally recognised, of Kings.

The origins of the House de Silva, are, like all the origins of the ancient aristocratic families of the High Middle Ages, uncertain as far as documentation is concerned.

Gutierre Peláez de Silva, Lord of Lugares, Alderete de Insam y Sufam y de la Quinta and Torre de Silva, was a knight who became "Ricohombre", who probably, took part in the conquest of Cordoba, too, in 1064.

But whatever his historical origins were, one of the most famous descendants of Don Gutierre Peláez de Silva was Don Ruy Gomez II de Silva y Meneses (1517–1573) Grande of Spain, Prince of Eboli, first Duke of Pastrana, V Lord of Ulme and Chamusca; statesman and best friend/counsellor of Philip II of Asburgo, King of Spain.

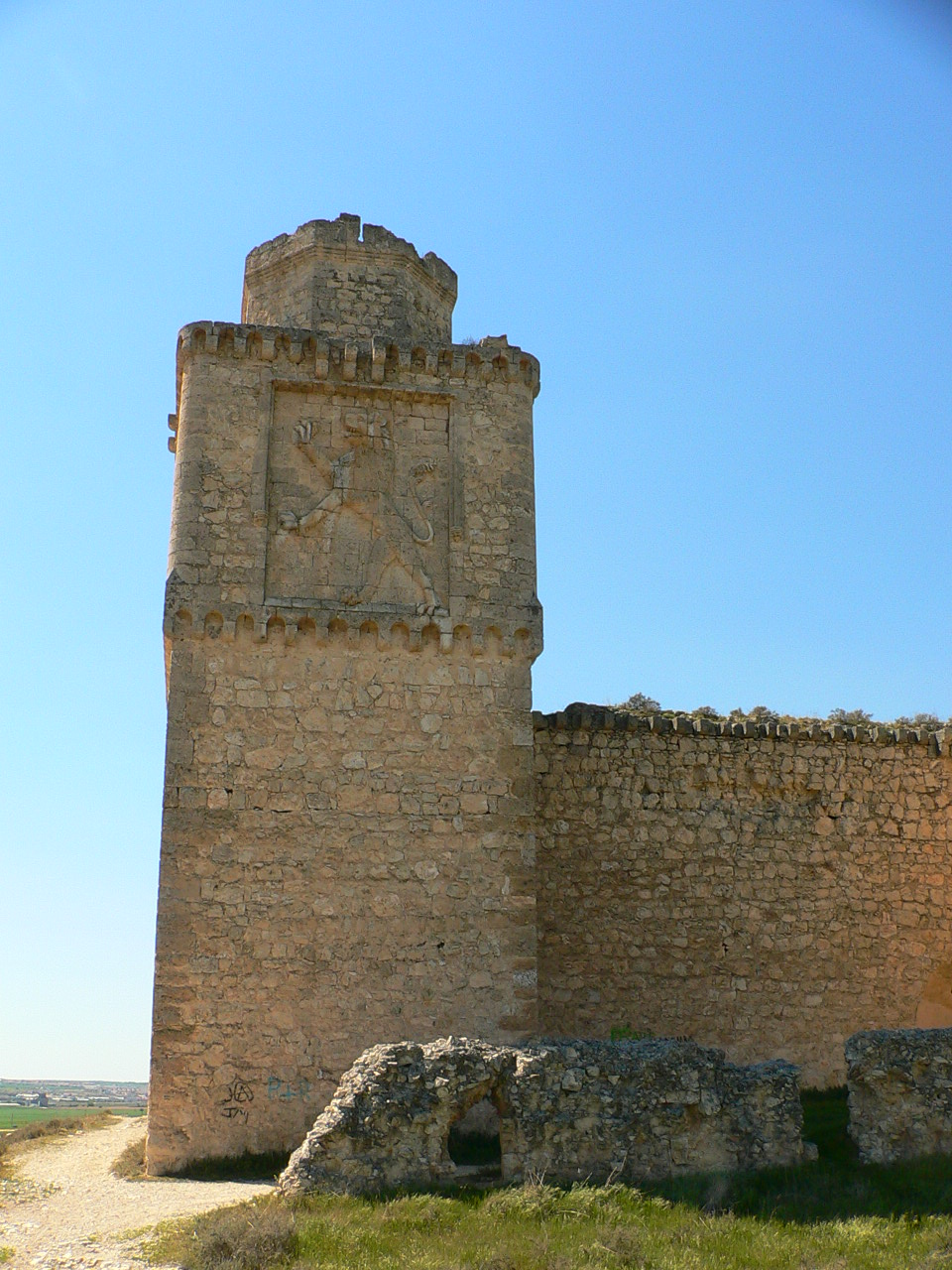
Tower of the Castle of Barcience with the rampant Lion of the House De Silva

From his marriage with Doña Ana de Mendoza de la Creda y de Silva Cifuentes [(1540–1592), one of the most beautiful women of Spain], there were born ten children. One of them, Don Rodrigo de Silva y Mendoza (1562–1596) II Duke of Pastrana, marrying Doña Ana de Portugal y Borja (1570–1629), descendant from the King Ferdinand I of Portugal, gave origin to the lineage De Silva Portugal; whereas another son, Don Diego de Silva y Mendoza (1564–1630), I Marquess of Alenquer and III Duke of Francavilla, gave origin to the lineage De Silva Alenquer. Lineage that from the marriage between his son Don Rodrigo de Silva Mendoza y Sarmiento (1600–1664) and Doña Isabel Fernández de Ixar [(1603–1642) V Duchess of Ixar, who by her own decree created her husband Duke of Ixar, became De Silva Fernández de Ixar.

The union of the two lineages, which brought to the birth of the House de Silva Fernández de Híjar Portugal, took place when don Fabrique III de Silva (1672–1700) IV Marquess of Orani, in the second half of the 17th century, married his IV degree cousin Doña Juana Petronilla de Silva Fernández de Ixar (1669–1710) VII Duchess de Ixar or Híjar.

The following division of the House De Silva Fernández de Híjar Portugal into three lineages (two Spanish and one Italian), was due to three children born from the two marriages of Don Andres Avelino de Silva Fernández de Híjar Portugal y Fernández de Cordoba (1806–1885) XIV Count-Duke of Aliaga and Count of Palma del Rio. From the first wedding with Doña Josefina de Ferrari y Bonet (1819–1876) (daughter of Don Jeronimo de Ferrari of Parma, "Kapellmeister" of King Ferdinando VII of Borbone) was born Doña Josefa Maria del Carmen de Silva Fernández de Híjar Portugal (1837–1906); who, with her daughter -doña María Dolores (1861–1923)- and with Doña María Dolores's son Don Vittorio Umberto de Silva Fernández de Híjar Portugal (1881/1954) [illegitimate son whom Doña Maria Dolores de Silva Fernández de Híjar Portugal had with Don Carlos Maria Fitz James Stuart y Portocarrero Palafox (1849–1901)XVI duke of Alba] by matrilineal descent gave origin to the Italian lineage still in existence. From his second wedding with Doña Mary Caroline Elisabeth Campbell y Vincent (1820–1894) were born ten children of whom two, [Alfonso I (1848–1930) and Jaime (1852–1925)], gave origin to the two Spanish lineages still in existence, too. The Spanish lineage of Alfonso I, like it had already happened to the House De Silva Fernández de Ixar Portugal with two unions between the De Silva and the Fitz James Stuart, rejoined the descendants of James Fitz-James I Duke of Berwick (1670–1734) [illegitimate son, who James II Stuart (1633–1701) King of England had with Arabella Churchill y Drake (1648–1730) sister of John Churchill I Duke of Marlborough] when Doña Maria del Rosario de Silva Fernández de Híjar Portugal y Guterbey (1900–1934) married Don Jacob Fitz James Stuart (1878–1953) IX Duke of Berwick and XVII Duke of Alba. In this way, by matrilineal descent, the Spanish lineage of the De Silva joined the dukedom of Híjar and its titles with the House Fitz James Stuart y de Silva Fernández de Híjar Portugal. Whereas the descendants of Don Jaime have just the titles of Dukes of Lecera and Dukes of Bournonville, the Fitz James Stuart y de Silva hold, actually, the majority of the titles of the House De Silva.

== Heraldry ==
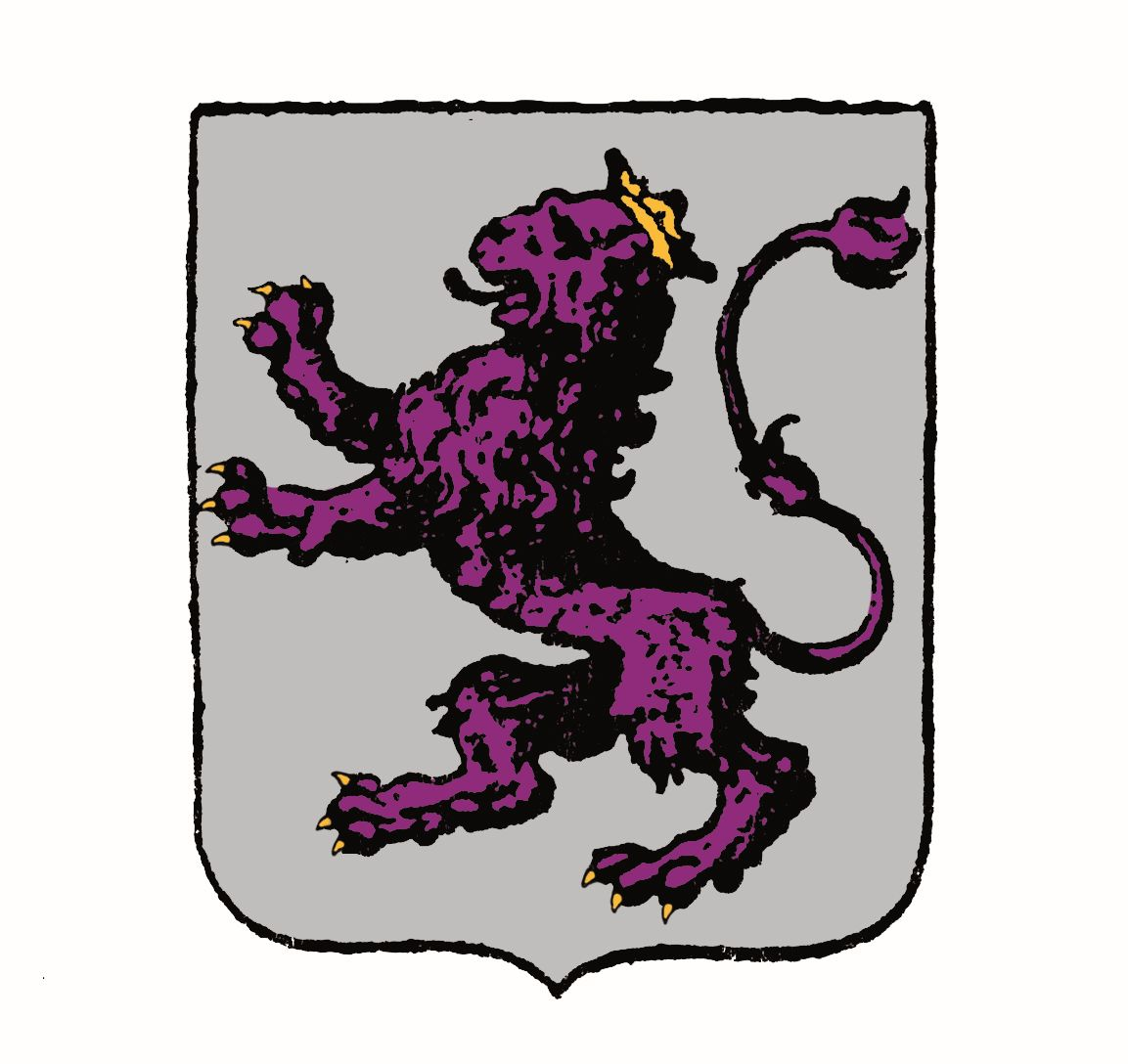
de Silva

De Salazar, in his "Historia Genealogica de la Casa de Silva" writes that "the Casa de Silva, like many in Spain, uses a heraldic device very different from the name by which it is known. Don Melchor de Teves refers (in the book de la Casa de Lerma) that on an ancient tomb of the de Silva family there is a rampant Crowned Lion. It seems that the first to use on his shield the symbol of the Lion was the Count don Gomez Paéz de Silva, who lived in the 12th century. He did it to remind his origin from the Royal House (Casa de Leon); to wear in their honour the same device as the House princes and to hand down to posterity the memory of his evident descendance from it... Drawing and painting the weapon (a rampant Lion of crimson colour, golden crowned on a silver background) exactly in the same way as the kings de Leon, Ovjedo and Galizia".

Others say that the count don Gomez Paéz de Silva was, for the same reasons, referring to the house of Borgogna, being his grandfather Gutirrez Pelaéz de Silva (1030–1110) the first to use the patronymic De Silva, vassal and counsellor of Henry of Borgogna count of Portugal.

Other primary Heraldries which characterize the House de Silva Fernández de Híjar Portugal are the ones of both the Fernández de Híjar house and of the Portugal family.

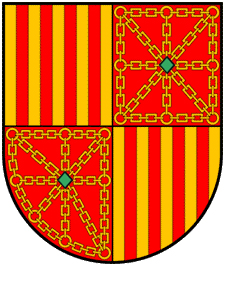
Fernández de Híjar

The first, of the Fernández de Híjar , shows the fusion of the lineages of Aragon and Navarra. In the shield of Pedro Fernández de Híjar (the bastard son who king Jaime I of Aragon had from doña Isabel Berenguela Fernández, granddaughter of the king of Navarra) we can see the five golden vertical bands alternated by four red vertical bands (de cuatro palos gules) symbol of Aragon and the golden chains, symbol of Navarra, framed and cross-shaped with, in the middle, an emerald on a red background.

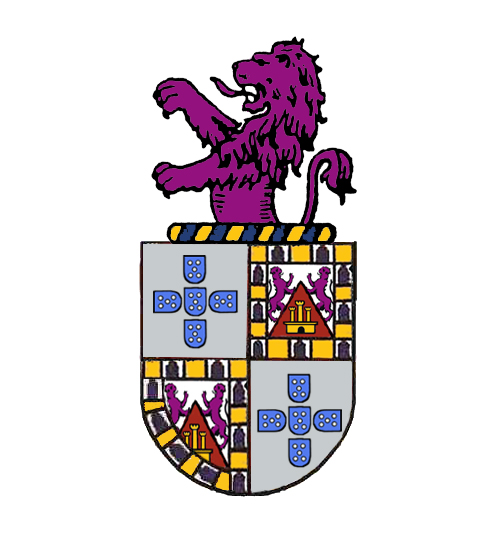
Portugal-Noronhas

The second, of the Portugal-Noronhas , in the I and IV quarters, shows five blue shields cross-shaped, each with five silver bezants, placed to quincunx of the house De Portugal and, in the II and III quarters, the castle with the three golden towers surmounted by two crimson lions of the house of Castiglia and of Leon. The quarter is framed by nine golden squares alternated by nine blue towers. doña Isabel de Portugal, bastard daughter of king Ferdinand I, married don Alfonso count of Gíjon Noronha, bastard son of the king Enrico II di Castiglia. Heraldry joins the symbols by matrilineal descent: Portugal-antigo (only because of the matrilineal line of the descendants of doña Isabel, daughter recognized by the king Ferdinando I) with that of the Noronhas.

The three ancient heraldries, in different periods, belonging to different lineages of the House de Silva, were joined to make the emblems of the: De Silva Portugal, De Silva Cifuentes, De Silva Alénquer, De Silva Alvarez de Toledo, De Silva Infantado, De Silva Fernández de Hijar, De Silva Fernández de Híjar Portugal, De Silva Pastrana and so on. Still, always in the shape where the crowned Lion of the ancient kings of Leon dominates.

== Viceroys, Military men, Politicians ==
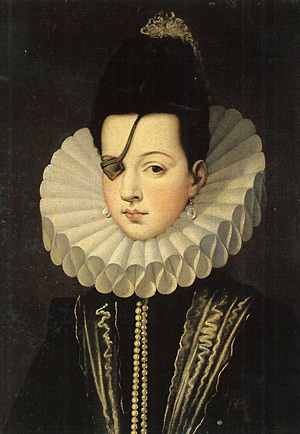
doña Ana de Mendoza de la Cerda y de Silva Cifuentes

- Don Gutiérre Pelaéz de Silva (1030–1110). Lord of Lugares, alderete de Insam y Sufam, y de la Quinta, y torre de Silva. It is certain that he went with King Ferdinand the Great to the conquest of Coimbra in the war against the Moors. He is considered the forefather of the House de Silva and such fact is proved in various genealogies both Castilian and Portuguese. He got married with Doña Maria Perez de Ambia. He had just one son: Don Pelayo Gutiérrez de Silva.
- Don Gomez Paez de Silva (1110–1170) Don Gomez, in the year 1166, had the dignity of count that, as in those days it was not yet hereditary, was given to the "Ricos Hombres" of high lineage who were ruling either over a seigniory (dominion) or, however, a very important territory. Don Gomez Paez possessed the castle of Santa Olaya and its territory, as Major Alcade. Earlier on, he had taken part in important battles: in 1139 in the battle of Campo di Orique. In 1160, together with his brother Don Pedro Paez de Silva, in two battles that the adelantado Don Gonzalo Mendez de Maya fought against the Moors at Campos de Beja, where the Christian armies defeated, in the same day, two Muslim armies. He married with Doña Urraca Nunéz Vello. His successor was his second son: Don Pelayo Gomez de Silva.
- Don Juan de Silva y Meneses Noronha I Count of Cifuentes (1399–1464). He was born in Toledo in 1399, son of Don Alonso Tenorio de Silva and of Doña Guiomar de Meneses Noronha. He can be considered as the founder of the count House of Cifuentes and ancestor of the Duchess of Pastrana by mother lineage: Doña Ana de Mendoza La Cerda y de Silva Cifuentes. In the year 1433 he became major ensign of the Kingdom of Castile. In 1434, as a consequence of his high dignity inside the kingdom, he went to the Council of Basel, where he behaved in such a wise and balanced way to be considered by all the people attending it, a man of great wisdom and trustworthy. "History" records that he reproached the English legates, who had arrogated to themselves the right of sitting in the Council without having the dignity, with his famous sentence : "no posa quien mal posa", today the motto of the House of the de Silva Fernandez de Híjar Portugal.
- Don Ruy Gomez II de Silva y Meneses (Chamusca, Kingdom of Portugal 27 October 1516 - Madrid, Kingdom of Castiglia 29 July 1573) first Prince of Eboli, Grande of Spain. Son of Don Francisco de Silva y Enriquez de Noronha, married, on Filippo II's advice in 1552, Doña Ana de Mendoza de la Cerda y de Silva Cifuentes from whom he had ten children. He firmly opposed the centralist and interventionist politics of Fernando Alvarez de Toledo, third Duke of Alba.
- Doña Ana de Mendoza de la Cerda y de Silva Cifuentes, (Cifuentes, Spain 29 June 1540 Pastrana, Spain 2 February 1592) Princess of Eboli, Grande of Spain daughter of Don Diego Hurtado de Mendoza y de la Cerda, Viceroy of Aragon, she was considered one of the most powerful and richest women in Europe. Very young, at just 12, she became the wife of Don Ruy Gomez II de Silva y Meneses, to whom she gave ten children. She had a strong political influence on the court of Don Filippo II and she was in sharp contrast with the House Alvarez de Toledo. She was the inspirer of what was called the Ebolista Party. She is said to have plotted, after her husband's death, together with Don Antonio Perez, secretary of the King, to separate the Kingdom of Portugal from Spain and to put her son Diego de Silva y Mendoza on the throne. Discovered and imprisoned, she died confined in the tower of her Palace of Pastrana.
- Don Diego de Silva y Mendoza de la Cerda de Silva Cifuentes (1564–1630), Count of Salinas and Ribadeo, III Duke of Francavilla, I Marquess of Alenquér, Grand of the Kingdom of Portugal. He was a very important poet and a Spanish politician of the "Siglo de Oro". Son of Don Ruy Gomez de Silva y Meneses and of Doña Ana de Mendoza de la Cerda y de Silva Cifuentes. His mother favoured him to his elder brother Rodrigo, II Duke of Pastrana, and managed to get him to inherit the Italian Dukedom of Francavilla from his grandfather Diego Hurtado. He married first with Doña Ana Sarmiento of Villadando de Ulloa in 1591, then with his sister-in-law Marina. His son was Don Rodrigo de Silva y Sarmiento Villadando de Ulloa, VIII Count of Salinas, then Duke of Híjar by his wife's decree (Rodrigo was the one who managed to rise Aragon against King Filippo IV of Habsburg when the King tried to become King of Aragon). He brought a long action against his brother Rodrigo for the acknowledgement of the Dukedom of Francavilla. Filippo II of Austria appointed him I Marquess of Alenquér which allowed him to become Grande of the Kingdom of Portugal. He had many missions from the kings of the house of Austria: Filippo II, Filippo III, Filippo IV. He was appointed general captain of Andalusia (1588) and, then, Viceroy of Portugal (1615–1622). As a poet, he is still considered one of the greats of the 17th century, like Luis de Gongora. His poetical writings have a great lyrical sensitiveness, really appreciated by the most important scholars and editors of the 20th and 21st centuries. Even nowadays it is possible to read his works which have lost very little of the past splendour.

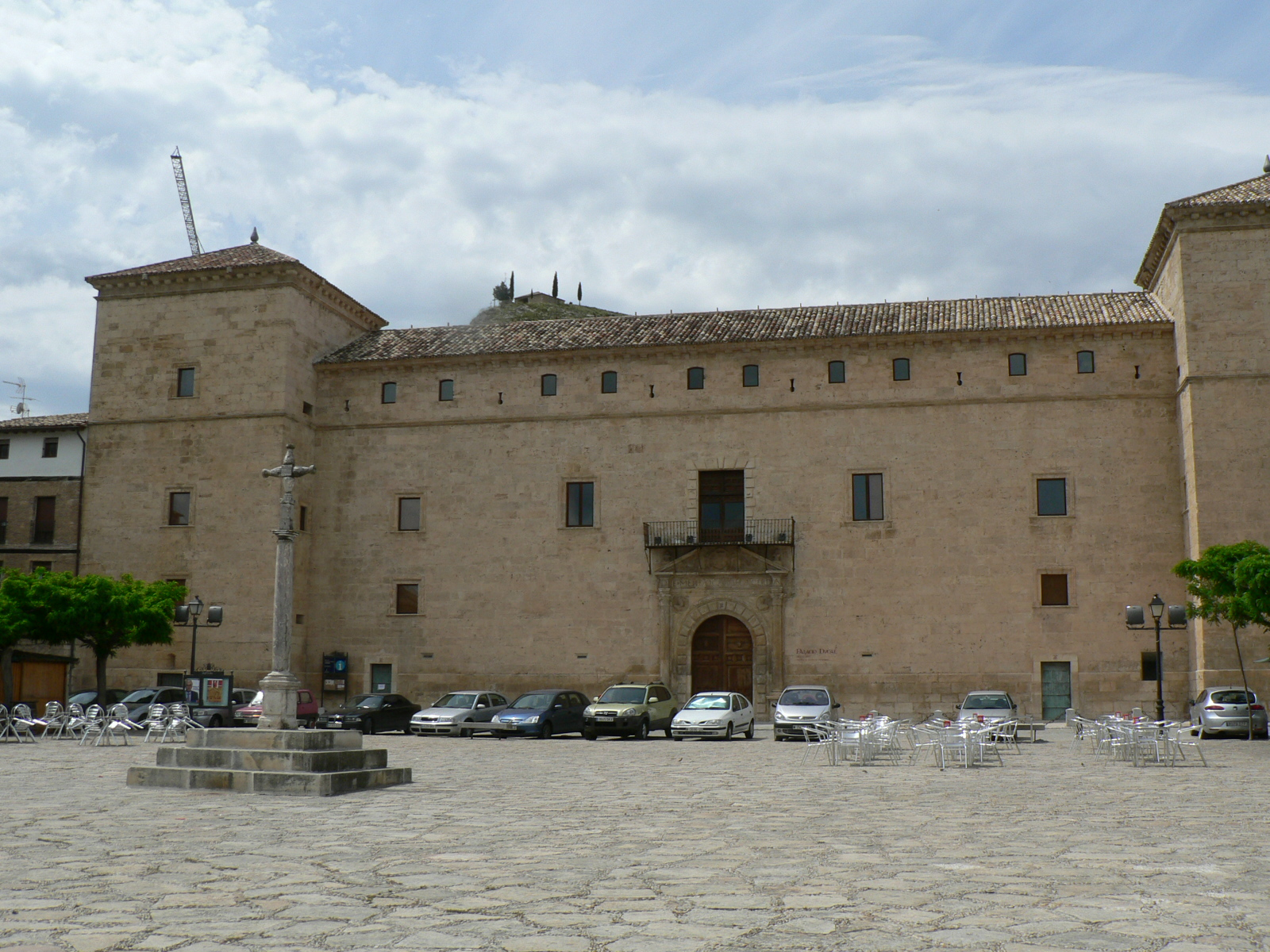
Palace of Pastrana, where was confined Ana de Mendoza

- Don Rodrigo de Silva Mendoza de la Cerda Cifuentes y Sarmiento (Madrid 1600-Leon 1664) II Marquess of Alenquer, Count of Salinas and other titles. Duke of Híjar by decree of his wife, Doña Isabella Margherita Fernández de Ixar y Castro Pinos, V Duchess of Híjar. Military man, politician, polemist. He had a command during the Portuguese War of Restoration. He was a political antagonist of the first Minister Count Duke de Olivares. He was involved in a conspiracy of nobles and banished from the Court of Don Filippo IV. In 1640 he was appointed general in chief of the armies of Aragon. He was charged of being involved in the attempt of "coup d'état" of Don Carlos Padilla (Master of field of Cavalry). Which was a Pronouncement that aimed at detaching Aragon from the Kingdom of Spain and put the Duke of Híjar on the Aragonese throne. When the plot was discovered, he was imprisoned and tortured, but he never admitted his guilt, unlike the others who were put to death: He was imprisoned and kept in chains, in the castles of Leon, where he died in 1664.
- Don Jaime Francisco Victor Sarmiento de Silva y Fernández de Híjar Castro Pinos (1625–1700). Son, of Don Rodrigo Sarmiento de Silva Mendoza and of Doña Isabel Margarita Fernández de Hijar, was the VI Duke of Hijar, VI Duke de Lecera, VI Duke of Aliaga, V Duke of Vallfogogna, IV Count of Guemira, IX Count of Salinas. He was great camerlengo, general captain, and Viceroy of Aragon from 1681 to 1697. Because of his poor health, he gave to his third wife, Doña Teresa Pimentel y Bonavedes, the power to govern all his feuds: his daughter, Doña Petronilla de Silva Fernández de Híjar y Pignatelli d'Aragon, succeeded him.
- Don Isidoro de Silva Portugal y Carvayal (1643–1682). Military man, son of the marquess Don Fadrique II de Silva Portugal and of Doña Ana Suarez de Carvayal. He was the III Marquess of Orani, Lord of the baronies of Monovar, Mur and Sollana, of the possessions of Nuoro, Bitti and of the Gallura Gemini, of the feuds of Ponalver and Alondiga. Chamberlain of the King, Knight Commander of Galizia and of the Order of Alcantara. He was appointed admiral of the Spanish galleys and after few years, he became General Commander of the fleet of the Sardinian galleys. He married Doña Agustìna Fernández Portocarrero Guzman with whom he had four children. His wife, at his death, succeeded him as a regent of the marquisate and in the administration of the family feuds. Doña Agustìna was succeeded by IV Marquess of Orani, her third child: Don Fadrique III de Silva Portugal y Portocarrero Guzman (1672–1700), husband of doña Juana Petronila de Silva Férnandez de Híjar y Pignatelli de Aragon.
- Doña Juana Petronila de Silva Fernandez de Híjar (1669–1710) y Pignatelli de Aragon. She was the VII Duchess of Híjar, VII Duchess of Lecéra, VII Duchess of Aliaga, X Countess of Salina and Ribadeo and others. She was lady-in-waiting of the Queen Doña Marìa de Orléans. She married twice: first with her cousin Don Fadrique de Silva Portugal y Portocarrero (1672–1700), III Marquess of Orani, Baron of Monovar, Lord of Penalver y Sollana in Valencia and of the regions of Nuoro, Bitti and of the Gallura Gemini in Sardinia. In this way, with the union of the House of Híjar with the House of Portugal (5-12-1688), the ducal house annexed the marquisate of Orani. Doña Juana Petronila had five children from Fadrique; she remarried with Don Fernando Pignatelli de Aragon, Prince of Montecorvino, governor of Galizia. She had no children from him. She was succeeded to the Dukedom of Híjar by her first son Don Isidro Francisco Fadrique de Silva Portugal y de Silva Fernandez de Híjar (1690–1749) who became the VIII Duke of Híjar and first titular of the House de Silva Fernandez de Híjar Portugal.
- Don José Rafael de Silva Fernandez de Ixar Portugal y Rebboledo de Palafox Guzman, Croy de Havré, Lante della Rovere (1776–1863). XIII Duke of Híjar, XII Count-Duke of Aliaga, X Maquess of Orani and others. Seven times Grand of Spain. He was conferred the order of the Toson d'Oro (15 November 1829). He fought at the battle of Trocadero (31 August 1823). Elder Major-domo and Grand Master of the "Royal House" of King Ferdinand VII de Borbòn and Chamberlain of the Queen. Married with Doña Juana Nepomucena Fernández de Cordoba from who he had three children: Cayetano, Andrés Avelino and Maria Antonia.

== Saints, Blesseds and Ecclesiastics ==
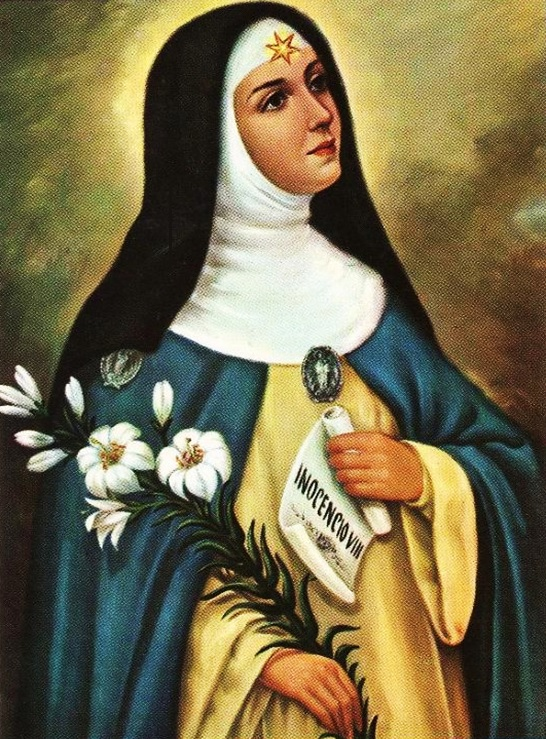
Saint Beatrice of Silva

- Saint Beatrice of Silva (Campo Maior, Portugal 1426 – Toledo, Spain 9 August 1492), daughter of Ruy Gomes da Silva, the first governor of Campo Maior, and Isabella de Menezes, the countess of Portalegre. In 1447 she was lady-in-waiting of Isabella d'Aviz, Queen of Castile, the granddaughter of the King John I of Portugal. Then, after entering a convent in 1454, Beatrice of Silva founded the religious Order of the Immaculate Conception (or Franciscan Conceptionists) and was inscribed by Pope Paul VI in the catalogue of the Saints on 3 October 1976.

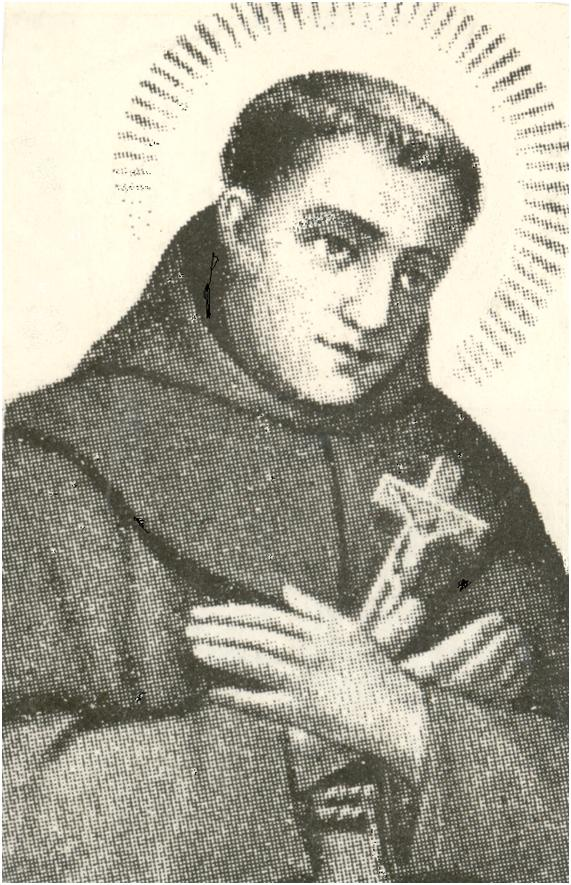
Blessed Amadeu of Silva

- Blessed Amadeu of Silva (in the world João de Menezes da Silva, Campo Maior, Portugal 1420 – Milan, Italy, 10 August 1482). Saint Beatrice de Silva's brother, he was a Reformer of the Franciscan Order and the founder of the Congregation of the Amadeiti (from Amadeu's name) established in 1464. Congregation of a strict observance of the Franciscan Rule and of strict customs, it was, later on, united to the Observant Friars Minor to avoid divisions inside the Franciscan Order.
- Fernando of Silva and Mendoza (Madrid 10 February 1571 – 23 July 1639). He was the last male child of doña Ana de Mendoza and of don Ruy Gomez II de Silva princess and prince of Eboli. He became famous with the name of Friar Pedro Gonzales de Mendoza, as it changed his name in honour of his ancestor, the great Cardinal Mendoza, when he became Franciscan in the monastery of La Salceda. He attained fame and riches as bishop of Siguenza and archbishop of Granada. He was literate (he wrote, among other works, the "History of Mount Celia", "The Convent of la Salceda", "Pastoral Letters" and "Immaculatae Conceptionists") and theologist, defender of the dogma of the Immaculate Conception of Mary (Mary Immaculate). Following the example of the Great Cardinal Mendoza, he was architect and maecenas, too. But while his father don Ruy Gomez was a protector of the Arab minority, Friar Pedro was a strong supporter of their expulsion from Spain.

== See also ==
- Amadeu de Silva
- Beatrice de Silva
- Ruy Gómez de Silva, 1st Prince of Éboli
- Ana de Mendoza, Princess of Eboli
- Cayetana Fitz-James Stuart, 18th Duchess of Alba
- Walter de Silva

== Archive sources ==
- Government of Aragona, Provincial Historical Archive of Zaragoza-Ducal Archive of Híjar. Documents relating to the following signatures:
- A) SI-333-4. Testamentaria Exc.mo Sr. Duque de Aliaga.
- B) SIV, 85-1/1. Poder para varios fines. El Sr. Marques de Almenara, don Alfonso de Silva, a favor de don Manúel Garcia de Huerta y Espinosa.
- C) S.IV, 851/2. Aliaga año 1875. Poder especial otorgado para el Exc.mo Sr. Duque de Aliaga a favor de don Manúel Garcia de Huerta y Espinosa.
- D) S.IV. 47–1. Paris 21 de Noviembre 1865 - Bayonne á 12 Octubre de 1875. Poderes generales del Exc. mo. Sr. Duque de Aliaga a favor de don Manuel Garcia de Huerta.
- E) S.IV, LEG.122-26. Híjar (Aliaga) - Madrid años de 1837 al 1867 y de 1875 al 1882. Asunto reservado de doña Josefa Ferrari con el Sr. don Andrés Avelino de Silva. Pension vitalicia de la misma y reclamaciones de su hija doña Carmen. Acompañan varios documentos y cartas hasta fino al 1882.
- F) Aliaga = Luzón, años 1874 al 76. Pension vitalicia de doña Josefa Ferrari y de su hija doña Carmen de Silva.
- G) Luzón, años 1883–1886. Pension de doña María Carmen Ferrari.
- H) S.III 97/14. Madrid años 1888 al 90. Correspondencia y fés de vida della pensionista doña Carmen de Silva Ferrari.
- I) Consulado de España en Milan, años 1891 y 92. Fés de vida de doña María Carmen de Silva Ferrari.
- Madrid. Anni 1877/1887. Registro Histórico Notarial de Madrid. Atti del notaio Miguel Díaz Arévalo.
- Milano. Municipal Historical Archive of Milan. Stato di famiglia integrale storico del 9/11/1869 (iscrizione da Parigi) (F).
- Torino, years 1801/1951 and 1786-1907/1949-2003. Archive de Silva Fernández de Ixar, original documents not present in the Provincial Historical Archive of Zaragoza and Ducal Archive of Híjar.
- Madrid. Archivo Histórico National de Madrid, document relating to don Lorenzo de Ferrari y Pozzo Conde de Cumbre Hermosa, 1737.

== Bibliography ==
- De Salazar y Castro L., Historia genealógica de la Casa de Silva, Madrid 1685.
- Reglamento de la Real Capilla. Copy signed by don José Rafael de Silva Fernández de Ixar XIII Duca di Híjar, Marquis of Orani. Imprenta de don Firmin Villalpando, impresor de Cámara de S.M., Madrid 1825.
- Tola P., Dizionario degli uomini illustri di Sardegna, Torino 1837.
- Spreti V. e collaboratori, Enciclopedia storico-nobiliare italiana: appendix part II, letter S pages 592–593, Milano 1935.
- De Mattos A., A heráldica dos bastardos reais portugueses, Pôrto 1940
- Archivo Histórico Nacional, Catálogo alfabético de los documentos referentes a Títulos del Reino y Grandezas de España, Madrid 1951.
- Loddo Canepa F., La Sardegna dal 1478 al 1793, Sassari 1974.
- Casula F. C., La Sardenya catalano aragonesa, perfil historic, Barcelona 1985.
- Floris F. – Serra S., Storia della nobiltà in Sardegna, Cagliari 1986.
- Bracchi G. - Martella G., Tecniche di organizzazione degli archivi, Torino 1988.
- Laborda Gracia M., Recuerdos de Híjar, Vol I e II; Centro de iniciativas turísticas del cuadro artístico de Híjar-Diputación General de Aragón, Zaragoza 1993.
- Casau Ballester Ma J., Archivo Ducal de Híjar. Catálogo de los fondos del antiguo Ducado de Híjar (1268–1919); Diputación General de Aragón, Valencia 1997.
- Floris F., Fondi e feudatari in Sardegna, Cagliari 1996.
- Pinna R., Atlante dei feudi in Sardegna, Cagliari 1999.
- Moreno Meyerhoff P., Il Marchesato di Orani, Università di Lleida, Lleida 2001.
- De Meo M., Le antiche famiglie nobili e notabili di Parma e i loro stemmi, Parma 2002.
- Istituto Salazar Y Castro, Elenco de Grandezas y Titulos Nobiliarios Españoles, Madrid 2006.
- A.A.V.V., Atlante Storico Zanichelli, Bologna 1966.
- A.A.V.V., Enciclopedia Italiana Treccani, Roma 1975.
- A.A.V.V., Enciclopedia Europea Garzanti, Milano 1984.
- Duby G., Atlante Storico S.E.I., Torino 1992.
