= Egido =

Egido is a surname. Notable people with the surname include:

- Isabel Belén Iniesta Egido (born 1989), Spanish politician
- José Ángel Egido (born 1951), Spanish actor
- Luciano G. Egido (born 1928), Spanish poet
- Mercedes de Jesús Egido (1935–2004), Spanish Roman Catholic nun

== History ==
The oldest recorded birth of a child by the Social Security Administration for the name Edigo is Saturday, October 5, 1935

== Etymology ==
The surname comes from Basque, meaning "Hillside wide".

== See also ==
- Egidio
