= Muro Dam =

Coordinates: 39.0162°N 7.0161°W

- Interactive map of Muro Dam
- Location: Campo Maior, Portalegre District, Portugal
- Opening date: Roman period

Dam and spillways
- Height: 4.6 m
- Length: 174 m
- Width (base): 4.2 m

The Muro Dam was a Roman dam in Portugal. Located near the eastern municipality of Campo Maior, it is the largest surviving ancient dam in the country south of the Tagus river.

The 174 m long structure features three slight bends in its course. Its downstream side is supported by a series of thirteen small buttresses at intervals of 3–4 m. The central section, where the dam is highest and strongest, is further strengthened on its air-side by three vertical arches which go from buttress to buttress.

== See also ==
- List of Roman dams and reservoirs
- Roman architecture
- Roman engineering

== Sources ==
- Decker, Alexander (1991), "Einige römische Talsperren im heutigen Portugal", in Garbrecht, Günther (ed.), Historische Talsperren, vol. 2, Stuttgart: Verlag Konrad Wittwer, pp. 73–81, ISBN 3-87919-158-1
