= Mercedes de Jesús Egido =

Servant of God Mercedes de Jesús O.I.C.

Religious
- Born: 29 March 1935; Salamanca, Spain
- Died: 3 August 2004 (aged 69); Alcázar de San Juan, Ciudad Real, Spain
- Venerated in: Roman Catholic Church

Mercedes de Jesús Egido y Izquierdo (29 March 1935 – 3 August 2004) was a Spanish Roman Catholic nun of the Order of the Immaculate Conception who undertook a major reform of the Order's way of life. The cause for her beatification is being investigated by the Holy See.

== Biography ==
Born María del Rosario Egido y Izquierdo in Salamanca, she was one of the nine children of Ildefonso Egido y Curto and Carmen Izquierdo y Olazzari, who were both tailors.

At the age of seven, Egido and her sister were enrolled in a boarding school operated by the Daughters of Charity of St. Vincent de Paul. Showing advanced comprehension of her studies, she was promoted several years ahead of her age group. After four years, however, she was required to leave the school as her parents considered moving to Madrid in the hope of finding more work. During this time, she developed a strong desire to become a missionary.

After a lengthy period of reflection, Egido followed her two older sisters into the Order of the Immaculate Conception on 25 October 1953, at the monastery of La Puebla de Montalbán, Toledo, Spain. She was admitted to the novitiate of the monastery on 27 April 1954, at which time she was given the religious name of Mercedes de Jesús. She took her temporary vows of consecrated life on 12 May 1955, and her solemn vows on 16 May 1958. On 20 January 1964 she was moved to Alcázar de San Juan, Ciudad Real, by the Federation of the Order.

Influenced by the Second Vatican Council's 1965 Decree on the Adaptation and Renewal of Religious Life, Egido followed Beatrice of Silva, the Portuguese foundress of the Order of the Immaculate Conception, and on 8 September 1996 became a reformer of the Order after she received the Decree of Approval of the amendments of the General Constitutions of the Order from the Holy See.

Egido died on 3 August 2004 in the Monastery of Alcázar de San Juan. The Requiem Mass was presided over by 19 priests including the emeritus Bishop Don Rafael Torija.

== Veneration ==
On 26 January 2011 the Holy See accepted her cause for beatification for investigation.
