= Convents in early modern Europe =

Convents in early modern Europe (1500–1800) absorbed many unmarried and disabled women as nuns. France deemed convents as an alternative to prisons for unmarried or rebellious women and children. It was also where young girls were educated as they waited to be married.

During the 17th century, over 80,000 women lived and were educated in convents. Nuns never received monetary compensation. They served without salary, surviving on charity. Although many young girls lived in the convents, they were not nuns. Every European Catholic city had at least one convent and some had dozens or more.

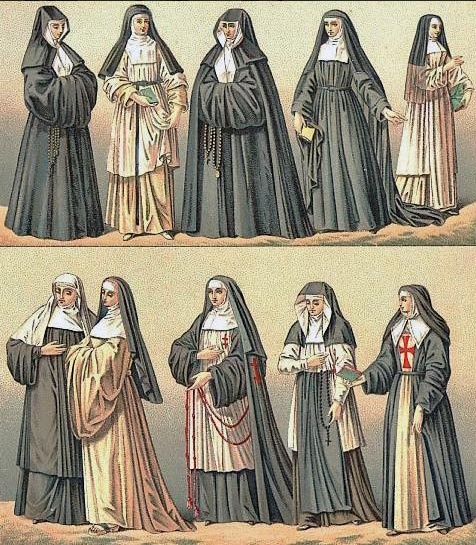

== Joining convents ==
Women joined convents for a variety of reasons. Although a dowry was paid to the church it was not as expensive as a wedding dowry, so many families sent their daughters to convents to escape dowry expenses. Women had fewer choices than in the twenty-first century—marriage or convent life. Thus, the structure of convents kept young women occupied and preserved their chastity until they reached marrying age.

Nuns dedicated their lives to the convent, the institution of marriage to God, and took three solemn vows: a life of chastity, poverty and obedience. According to the Church, the life of a cloistered nun was deemed to be the most honorable existence for women. During the Catholic Reformation, nuns recruited and cloistered new members of the Church.

The Catholic Church targeted prostitutes for convent life or helped them marry, in the hope that the women would leave their sinful lives. By serving Christ, they would purify themselves and gain salvation.

== Education ==
Convents served as rare institutions for female education during this period. Daughters of noble families were often educated from a young age within a monastery/convent before either taking vows to become a nun themselves or leaving to marry. This basic education commonly offered instruction on classical skills such as theology, Latin, and music. For noble daughters who would go off to be married, this was often the extent of their formal education. However, those who took the veil often had access to further educational materials present in Convent libraries. This allowed some nuns to further their education in fields traditionally forbidden to women, such as medicine. With more time devoted to studies, nuns had well-rounded skillsets that boasted of music composition, medicinal knowledge, and theological debates. Due to this higher level of literacy, most writings that we have from women during the medieval and early modern period can be attributed to nuns.

== Secular Relations ==
While nuns were primarily occupied within their convents, maintaining secular relations was essential to the prosperity of the institution. In order to maintain vows of poverty convents often had no means of producing their own income. Therefore they largely relied on the charity of those outside the institution. Funding for convents was largely sustained on the dowries provided by the parents of the girls installed in the institution’s care. Maintaining relationships with family, friends, mentors, and those seeking guidance was another avenue in which nuns could secure donations. These methods of correspondence were part of a nun’s daily routine. Letters were an important form of connection between the nuns and their secular patrons, and the exchange of financial or physical gifts took place mainly in this format.

In addition to lettered correspondence, nuns were permitted to maintain secular connections in person. Cloistered nuns were able to (and frequently did) leave their Monasteries to tend to sick loved ones.
