= Amadeus of Portugal =

Portuguese nobleman and Friar Minor, reformer of the Order

Blessed Amadeus of Portugal OFM
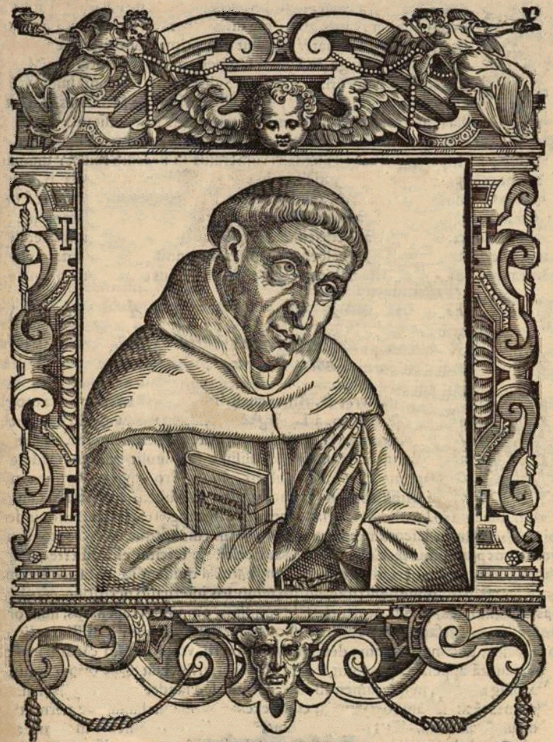
- Vera effigies, published in Pietro Ridolfi's Historiarum Seraphicae Religionis, 1586

Confessor
- Born: João de Menezes da Silva circa 1420; Campo Maior, Alentejo Region, Kingdom of Portugal
- Died: 10 August 1482; Milan, Duchy of Milan
- Venerated in: Catholic Church (Franciscan & Conceptionist Orders, Spain & Portugal)
- Feast: 12 August
- Attributes: Reformer of the Order of Friars Minor (Franciscans)
- Major works: Apocalypsis nova

Amadeus of Portugal (Campo Maior, Portugal ca. 1420 – Milan, Duchy of Milan, 10 August 1482), born João de Menezes da Silva, was a Portuguese nobleman who became first a Hieronymite monk, then left that life to become a friar of the Franciscan Order. Later he became a reformer of that religious order, which led to his founding of a distinct branch of the Friars Minor that was named after him, but later suppressed by the Pope in order to unite them into one great family of Friars Minor Observants (1568).

His Apocalypsis nova, which contained prophecies of a pope, the "Angelic Pastor", who would work with an emperor to restore harmony in the church and the world, was influential well into the next century, in Rome and the monarchies of Spain and Portugal.

== Life and church ==
He was born João de Menezes da Silva in 1420 in Campo Maior, Portugal, the youngest of the eleven children of Rui Gomes da Silva, the first alcaide of Campo Maior, on the border of Castile and Portugal, and of Isabel de Menezes, an illegitimate daughter of Pedro de Meneses, 1st Count of Vila Real and 2nd Count of Viana do Alentejo, under whom Silva served in Ceuta. One of his sisters was Beatrice of Silva, a noted Marian mystic and the foundress of the monastic Order of the Immaculate Conception.

Silva married at eighteen, but left his bride the instant he was married, and went into Spain, where he fought against the Moors under John II. He then decided to become a monk, beginning his religious life in the Hieronymite monastery of Santa María de Guadalupe, where he spent about ten years. Desirous of joining the Franciscans, he abandoned that life and went to Úbeda, Castile, where he was received into the order in 1452, entering as a lay brother. He chose to seek Holy Orders after a few years, and was ordained in 1459. After that, while living in various friaries, chiefly in Milan, he attracted attention by his virtue and purported miracles. Under the protection of the Archbishop of Milan, he established the friary of Our Lady of Peace (1469) which became the center of a Franciscan reform. The Minister General of the Order, Francesco della Rovere, extended his protection to him. When later the Minister General became Pope Sixtus IV he called Amadeus to Rome to be his confessor. Other foundations were then made in Italy, among them one at Rome. He returned to Milan, where he was taken sick, and died in August 1482.

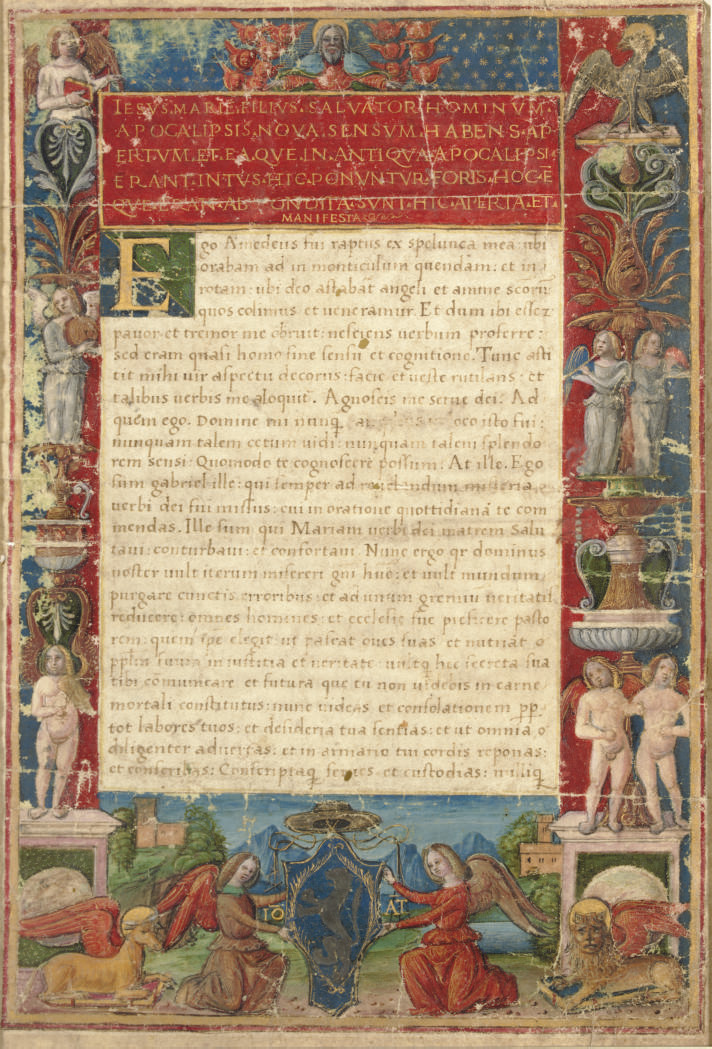
The opening page of an illuminated manuscript of Amadeus's Apocalypsis Nova, made in Veneto, c. 1500

== Legacy ==
Supernatural favors attributed to his intercession aided in the spread of his cultus, and the Bollandists testify to the authenticity of the title "Blessed" bestowed on him.

The friaries he founded continued, after his death, to form a distinct branch of the Minorites. These friars were called the Amadeans or Amadists, and they had twenty-eight houses in Italy, the chief one being Saint Peter de Montorio in Rome. Pope Innocent VIII gave them the friary of Saint Genesto near Cartagena, in Castile (1493). The successors of Amadeus: Georges de Val-Camonique, Gilles de Montferrat, Jean Allemand and Bonaventura de Cremona, preserved his foundation in its original spirit until Pope Pius V suppressed it, along with similar branches of the Franciscan Order, uniting them into one great family of Friars Minor Observants (1568).

== Works ==
He composed a treatise entitled De revelationibus et prophetiis, two copies of which are mentioned by Nicholas Antonio. The work of another Amadeus, Homilies on the Blessed Virgin, has been erroneously attributed to him. His Apocalypsis nova is a dialogue with the Archangel Gabriel about Christian doctrines, which, in some parts, is a commentary on the Book of Revelation.

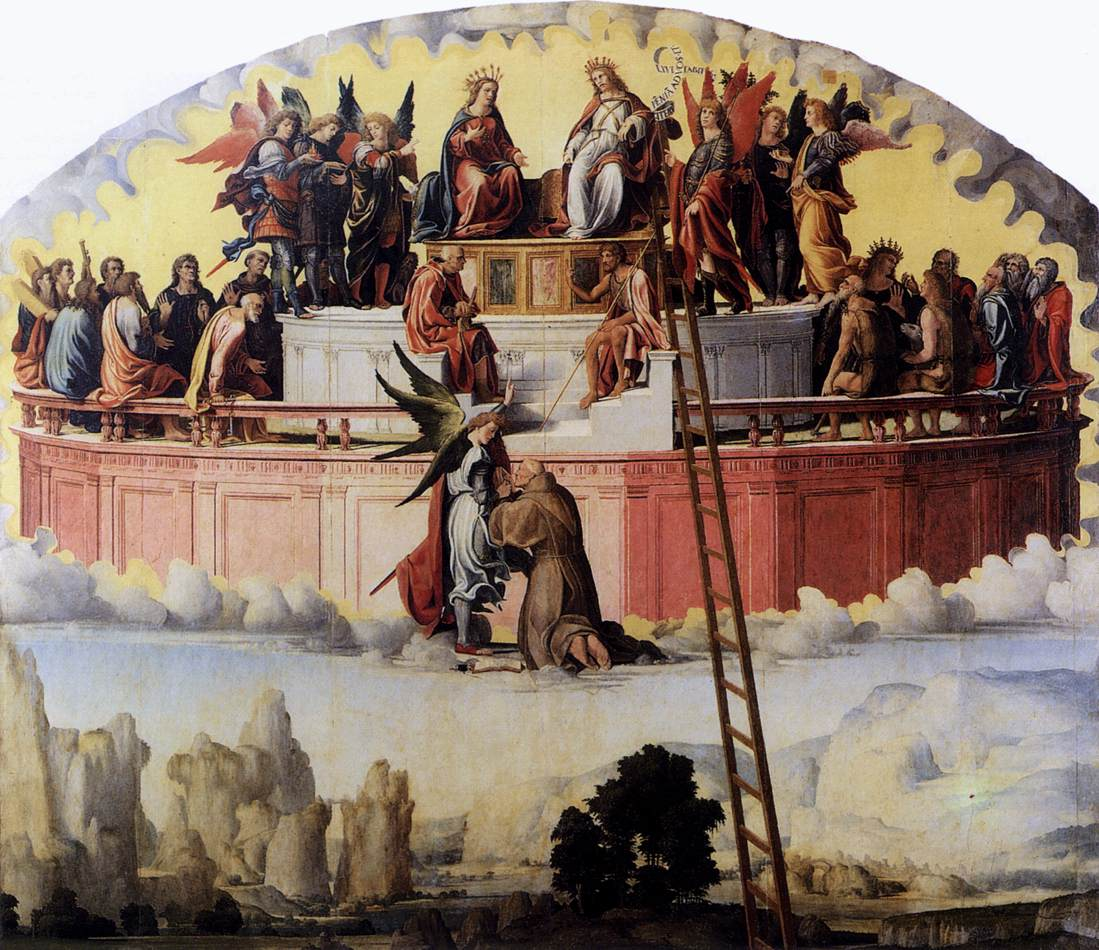
Seven Princes of Heaven: Michael, Gabriel, Raphael, Uriel, Sealtiel, Jehudiel, and Barachiel. Vision of the Blessed Amadeu da Silva by Pedro Fernández de Murcia, circa 1514.

In ecstasy with the Archangel Gabriel, Amadeus revealed and prayed the Seven Archangels with the names that are not recognized by the Roman Catholic Church (Jegudiel, Gabriel, Selaphiel, Michael, Uriel, Raphael, and Barachiel).
