= Rui Nabeiro =

Portuguese entrepreneur (1931–2023)

Rui Nabeiro GCIH ComMI
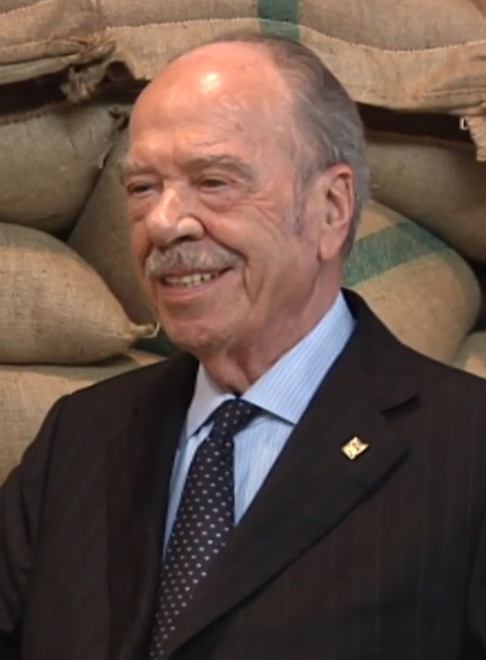
- Born: Manuel Rui Azinhais Nabeiro; 28 March 1931; Campo Maior, Portugal
- Died: 19 March 2023 (aged 91); Lisbon, Portugal
- Occupation: Businessman

Manuel Rui Azinhais Nabeiro GCIH ComMI (28 March 1931 – 19 March 2023) was a Portuguese billionaire businessman and philanthropist. He was the founder of the Delta Cafés group.

== Biography ==
Rui Nabeiro was born in Campo Maior, District of Portalegre, Portugal, in 1931. He studied until the fourth grade, the primary school education in Portugal. Starting at 12, he helped his mother in a small grocery store and his father and uncles in a family-owned coffee roasting workshop, at a time when the effects of the civil war in Spain (1936-1939) were still felt and the Portugal-Spain border was a place of smuggling. He assumed the leadership of his family-owned coffee roasting business at 19, and Delta Cafés was founded by him in 1961, around his 30th birthday. A market leader in the coffee roasting business, he established Novadelta in 1982, and in 1984, he created a new coffee roasting factory, which was the largest on the Iberian Peninsula at the time. In 2022, Rui Nabeiro was awarded a doctorate honoris causa by the University of Coimbra under the proposal of its School of Economics (FEUC). In the same year, he won the Award for Merit and Excellence at the Golden Globes.

== Distinctions ==
=== National orders ===
- Grand Cross of the Order of Prince Henry the Navigator (5 January 2006)
- Commander of the Order of Entrepreneurial Merit, Class of Industrial Merit (9 June 1995)
