= Convent =

Religious community or the building used by such a community

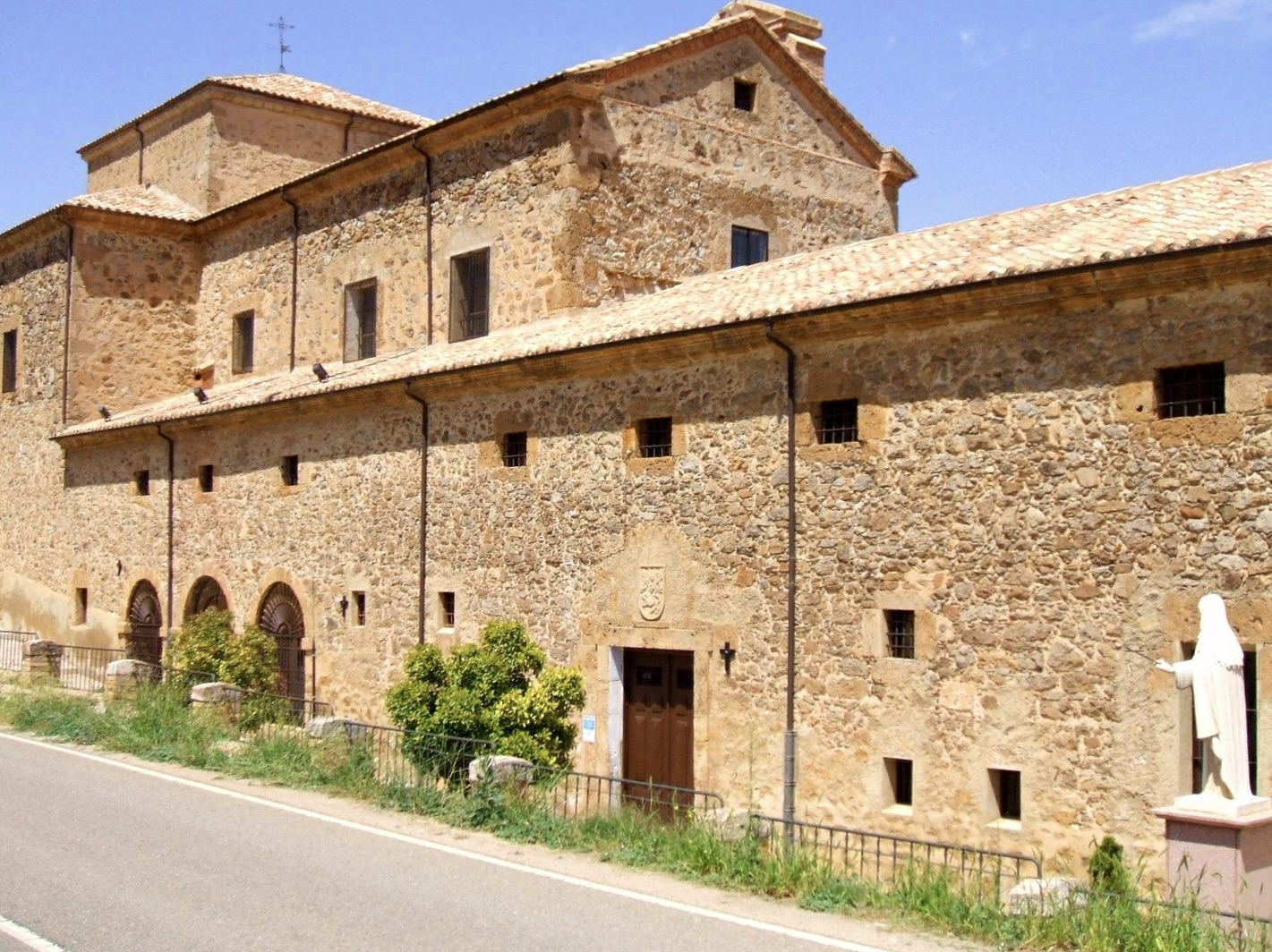
Convent of the Conceptionists in Ágreda, Spain (Roman Catholic)

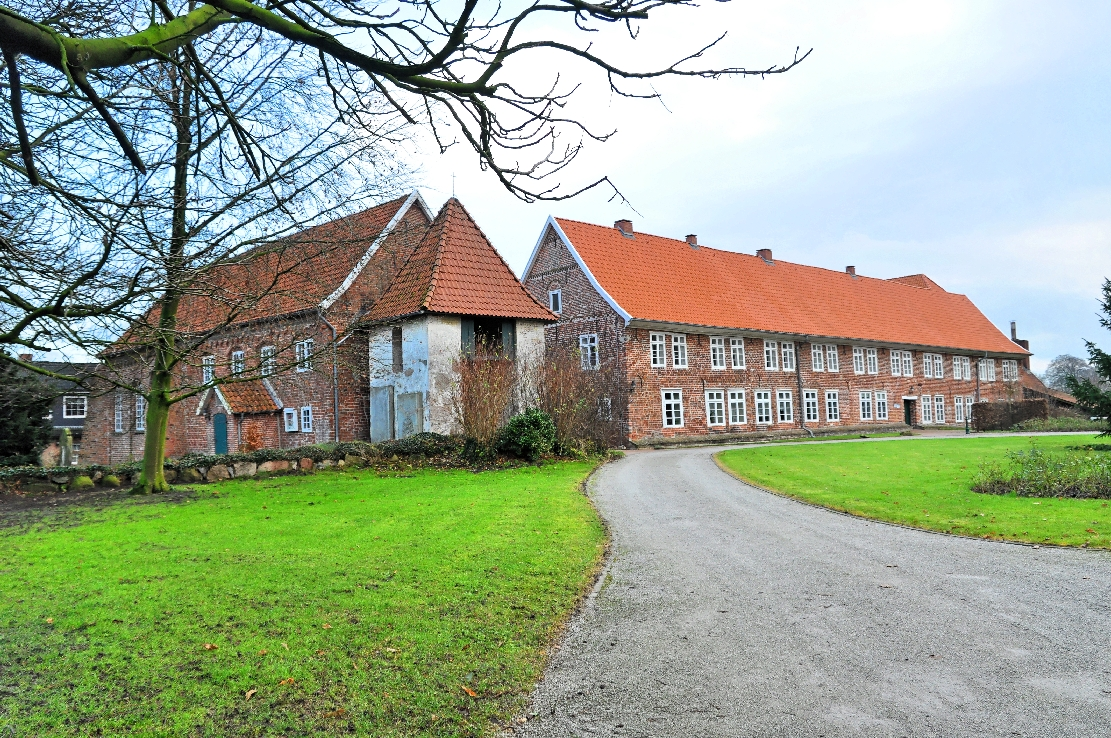
Neuenwalde Convent in Germany belongs to the Evangelical Lutheran tradition of Christianity

A convent is an enclosed community of monks, nuns, friars or religious sisters. Those residing in a convent are conventuals. A convent is also the building used by the community, especially in Catholic, Lutheran, and Anglican traditions.

== Etymology and usage ==
The term convent derives via Old French from Latin conventus, perfect participle of the verb convenio, meaning "to convene, to come together". It was first used in this sense when the eremitical life began to be combined with the cenobitical. The original reference was to the gathering of mendicants who spent much of their time travelling. Technically, a monastery is a secluded community of monastics, whereas a friary or convent is a community of mendicants (which, by contrast, might be located in a city), and a canonry is a community of canons regular. The terms abbey and priory can be applied to both monasteries and canonries; an abbey is headed by an abbot or an abbess, and a priory is a lesser dependent house headed by a prior or a prioress. In the Middle Ages, convents often provided to women a way to excel, as they were considered inferior to men. In convents, women were educated and were able to write books and publish works on gardening or musicology or on religion and philosophy. The abbess of a convent was often also involved in decisions of secular life and interacted with politicians and businessmen. Unlike an abbey, a convent is not placed under the responsibility of an abbot or an abbess, but of a superior or prior.

In modern English usage, since about the 19th century, the term convent almost invariably refers to a community of women, while monastery and friary are used for communities of men. In historical usage they are often interchangeable, with convent especially likely to be used for a friary. When applied to religious houses in Eastern Orthodoxy and Buddhism, English refers to all houses of male religious as monasteries and of female religious as convents.

== History ==
The mendicant orders appeared at the beginning of the 13th century with the growth of cities; they include in particular the Dominicans, the Franciscans, the Carmelites, and the Augustinians. While the Benedictine monks and their various variants devoted themselves to their agricultural properties, the mendicant friars settled from the start in the cities, or in the suburbs thereof, preferably in the poorer and more densely populated districts. They therefore had to adapt their buildings to these new constraints.

Mary Kenny noted in a 2004 article that as a result of the "renewal and adaptation of religious life" instituted by the Second Vatican Council, many religious sisters no longer live in "convents" but in smaller communities or even alone.

== See also ==
- Christian monasticism
- Convents in early modern Europe
- Enclosed religious orders
