= Delta Cafés =

Portuguese coffee-making company

Novadelta, S.A.
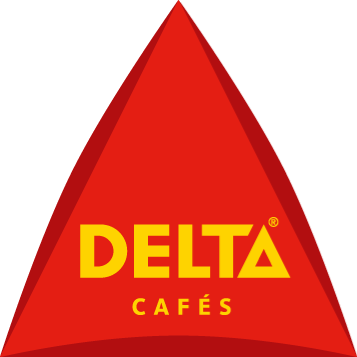
- Type: Sociedade Anónima
- Founded: 1961
- Founder: Rui Nabeiro
- Headquarters: Campo Maior, Portugal
- Area served: Worldwide
- Products: Coffee, tea, sandwiches and iced drinks
- Website: www.deltacafes.com/en

Delta Cafés (Portuguese pronunciation: [ˈdɛltɐ kɐˈfɛʃ]) is a Portuguese coffee roasting and coffee packaging company headquartered in Campo Maior, Alentejo. The company was founded in 1961 and is among the top market leaders in the Iberian Peninsula. Founded by Rui Nabeiro (1931-2023), its conglomerate includes interests in agribusiness, agriculture, real estate, hotels, and other businesses.

== History ==
Delta Cafés was founded by Rui Nabeiro in 1961 in the town of Campo Maior, Alentejo, in a small 50 square metres (540 ft^{2}) warehouse, which could only handle two 30 kilograms (66 lb) roasters and with the participation of only three workers. In 1994, the company became Portugal's market leader with a share of 42%. In 1998, the Nabeiro/Delta Cafés Group was restructured and gave rise to 22 companies organized into strategic areas, with turnover of approximately €160 million. In the 2000s, it became the market leader for coffee in Portugal, with a market share of 38%. It has 47,000 direct retail clients (among the largest of which is Sonae, a leading Portuguese retailer) and 3,000 employees. Also in the 2007, Delta Cafés launched its own espresso products, Delta Q, based on a proprietary system of single-serving "capsules" containing ground coffee and rooibos, and specialized machines to brew espresso from the contents of the capsules in a similar way to that of Nestlé's Nespresso brand portfolio. In October 2017, Delta Cafes partnered with the 'e-commerce' platform Alibaba. In July 2018, Delta joined the international coffee association International Coffee Partners (ICP).
