= Conceptionists =

Catholic monastic order of Franciscan nuns

Order of the Immaculate Conception
- Ordo Immaculatæ Conceptionis
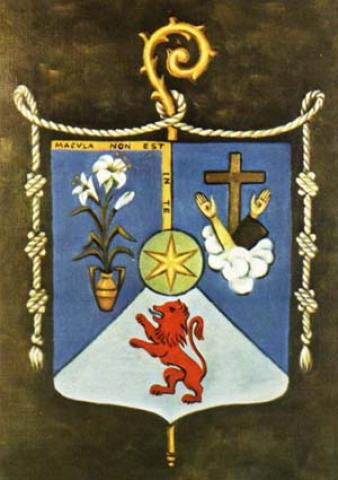
- Abbreviation: O.I.C.
- Nickname: Conceptionists
- Formation: 1484; 542 years ago
- Founder: Beatrice of Silva
- Founded at: Toledo, Spain
- Type: Monastic Order of Pontifical Right for women
- Members: 1,409 members as of 2020
- Website: www.concepcionistas.info

The Order of the Immaculate Conception (Latin: Ordo Immaculatae Conceptionis, Spanish: Orden de la Inmaculada Concepción), abbreviated as OIC, also known as Conceptionists, is a enclosed religious order of Pontifical Right for nuns founded by Beatrice of Silva in 1484. Initially they followed the Cistercian Rule. In 1501, however, they adopted the Rule of St. Clare, in common with the Order of Poor Clares, founded by Clare of Assisi, but in 1511 they were recognized by the Holy See as a separate religious order, with a new Rule unique to their order. Despite this change, they continue to be considered a part of the Franciscan Second Order. (In some areas they are still known as the Franciscan Sisters of the Immaculate Conception.)

== Origins ==
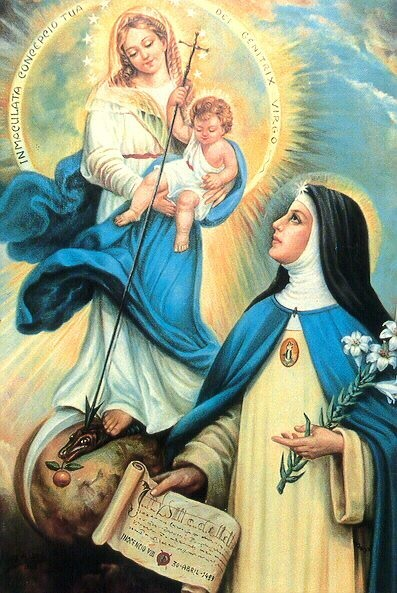
Painting of the apparition of the Immaculate Virgin Mary to Beatrice of Silva

The order was founded in 1484 in Toledo, Spain, by Beatrice of Silva, a noblewoman of Portugal and sister of the Franciscan friar, Blessed Amadeus. On the marriage of Princess Isabel of Portugal with King John II of Castile, Beatrice had accompanied the future Queen, her cousin, to the court of her new husband. After the marriage, however, her great beauty aroused the jealousy of the queen, for which she was imprisoned. During that time of incarceration, Beatrice experienced an apparition of the Blessed Virgin Mary, telling her that she wanted Beatrice to found a new Order in her honor.

Beatrice escaped with difficulty and took refuge in the Dominican convent at Toledo. There, for thirty-seven years, she led a life of holiness, however without becoming a member of that order. In 1484, Beatrice, with some companions, took possession of a convent in Toledo set apart for them by Isabella I of Castile.

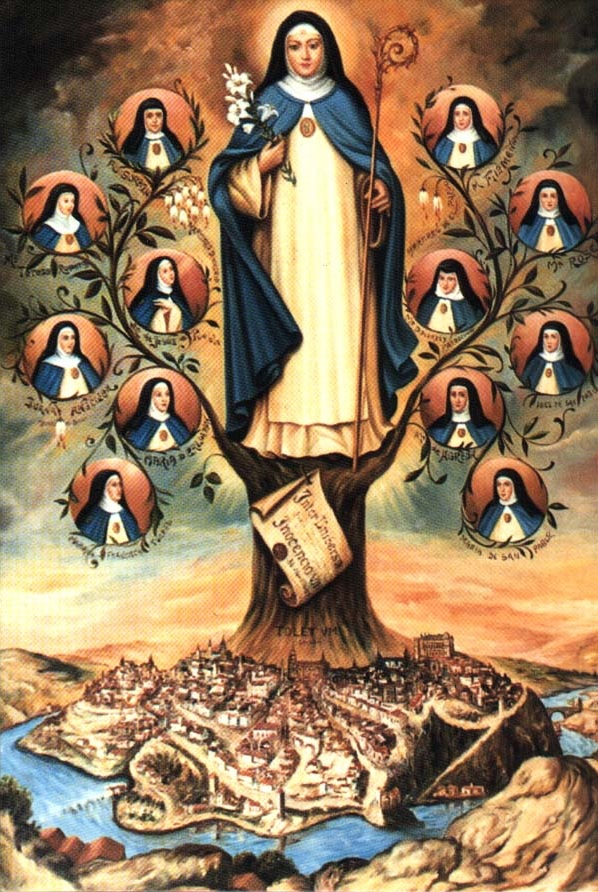
The Order of the Immaculate Conception was founded by the Portuguese Beatrice of Silva

In 1489, by permission of Pope Innocent VIII, the nuns adopted the Cistercian rule, bound themselves to the daily recitation of the Divine Office, and they were placed under obedience to the ordinary of the diocese. In 1501, Pope Alexander VI united this community with the Benedictine community of San Pedro de las Duenas, under the rule of St. Clare, but in 1511 Julius II gave it a rule of its own and put them under the protection of General Minister of Friars Minor, for this reason the nuns were called Franciscan Conceptionists. Special constitutions were drawn up for the Order in 1516 by Cardinal Francisco de Quiñones. It was the foundress, Beatrice of Silva, who chose the white habit, with a white scapular and blue mantle.

A second convent was founded in 1507 at Torrigo, from which, in turn, were established seven others. The order soon spread through Portugal, Spain, Italy, France; Spain's colony of New Spain (Mexico), starting in 1540 and as well as in Portugal's colony of Brazil. (That community, however, later separated to become a religious congregation of missionary sisters of the Third Order of St. Francis.). At its height there were some 2,000 convents of the order throughout the world. As of 2020, there were about 1,400 members in 127 houses.

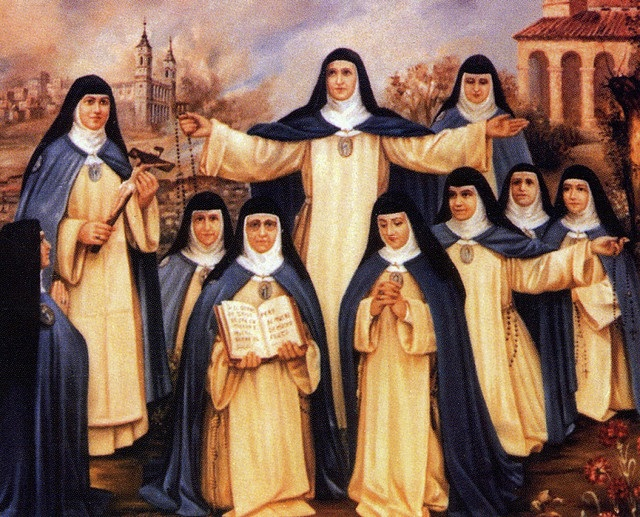
The Conceptionist nuns martyrs

The foundress, Beatrice of Silva, was canonized by Pope Paul VI in 1976. In 2019, Pope Francis gave his approval to the declaration of the martyrdom of Maria del Carmen and 13 companions, all Conceptionists, who were killed in Madrid in 1936 during the Spanish Civil War.

== Vatican II ==
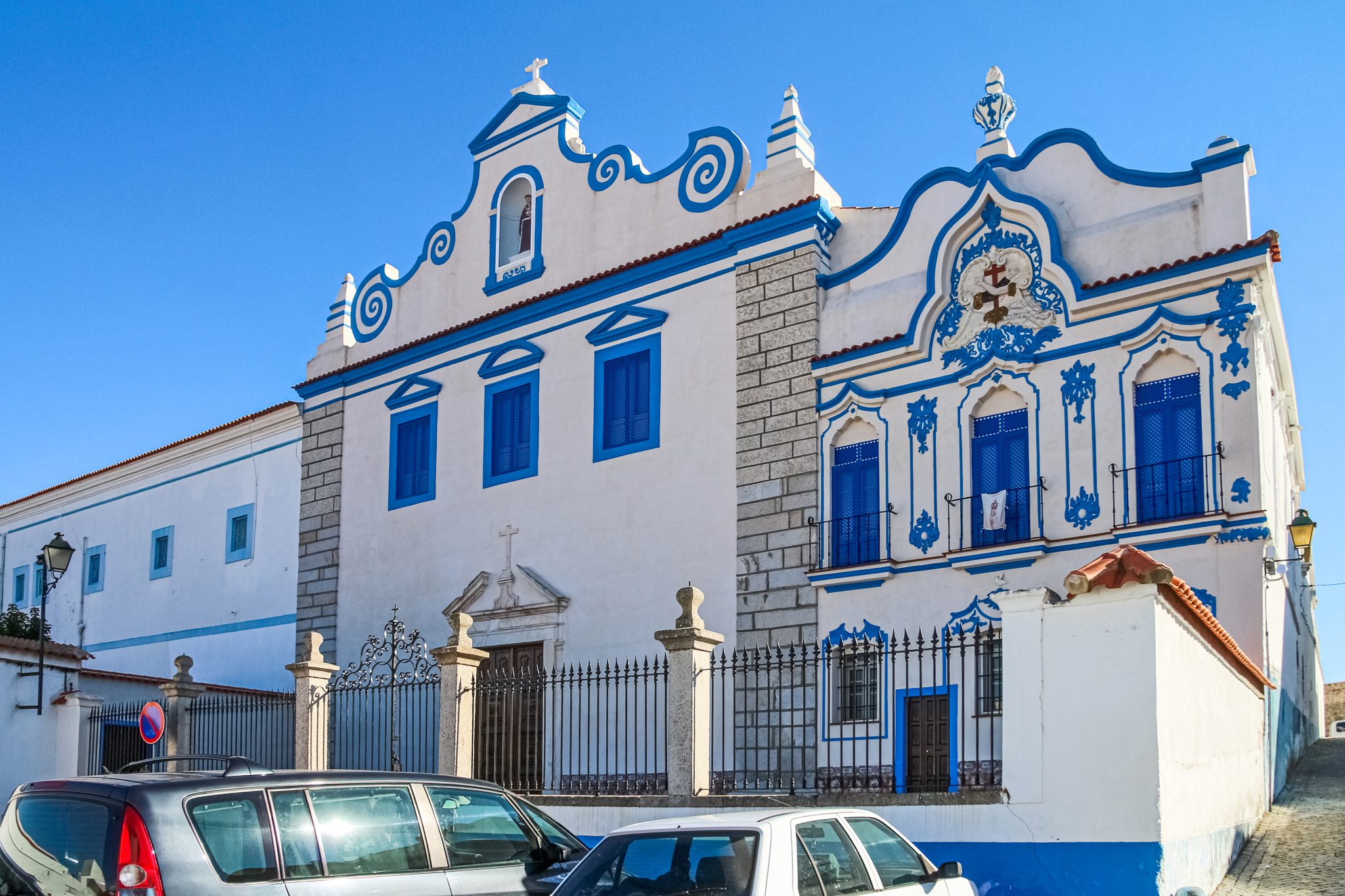
Monastery of the Conceptionist nuns in Campo Maior, Portugal, birthplace of Beatrice of Silva, the foundress of the religious order

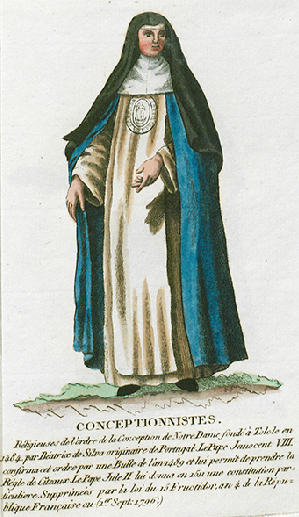
The Conceptionists' religious habit.

The Second Vatican Council had instructed all religious institutes to go back to the inspirations and goals of their founders and to make sure that their current orientation and lifestyles of the communities were in keeping with these.

Through the studies done by Mercedes de Jesús Egido y Izquierdo (1935–2004), a new direction was developed and tried on an experimental basis at her convent. After a trial of two years, new constitutions were drawn up out of the experience, which were submitted to Rome and approved by the Holy See in 1996 for this order, removing from it the noticeable Franciscan influence imposed upon it. Egido successfully argued that the foundress' vision was that of a life lived in imitation of the virtues of the Blessed Virgin Mary. She has become seen as a second foundress through her efforts. The process for seeking Egido's canonization was formally opened at the Monastery of the Immaculate Conception and St. Beatrice in Toledo on 8 November 2011.

== Saints, Blesseds, and other holy people ==
Saints

- Beatrice of Silva (c. 1424 – 16 August 1492), founder of the Order, canonized on 3 October 1976

Blesseds

- María Isabel Lacaba Andia and 13 Companions (died between 22 August to 8 November 1936), Martyrs of the Spanish Civil War, beatified on 22 June 2019

Venerables

- María (of Jesus) Tomelín del Campo (21 February 1579 – 11 June 1637), Mexican professed religious, declared Venerable on 3 July 1785

Servants of God

- Mariana Francisca (of Jesus) Torres Berriochoa (c. 1563 – 16 January 1635), professed religious, declared as a Servant of God on 22 March 1986
- María (of Jesus) Coronel y de Arana; 2 April 1602 – 24 May 1665), abbess and spiritual writer, declared as a Servant of God on 28 January 1673
- Custódia do Couto Ribeiro (Custódia Maria of the Blessed Sacrament) (17 June 1706 – 22 June 1739), Portuguese professed religious
- María Josefa (of the Sorrows and the Patronage) Quiroga Capopardo (27 April 1811 – 27 January 1891), mystic
- Jacinta María Romero Balmaseda (Teresa of Jesus) (9 October 1861 – 12 May 1910), professed religious, declared as a Servant of God in 2011
- Florencia Sorazu Aizpurúa (María of the Angels) (22 February 1873 – 28 August 1921), professed religious, declared as a Servant of God on 24 February 1988
- Maria Joanna Laselva (Maria de Lourdes of Saint Rose) (26 October 1910 – 19 November 1974), professed religious, declared as a Servant of God in 2008
- María (Ana) de la Concepción Cruz Alberdi Echezarreta (3 May 1912 – 27 November 1998), professed religious, declared as a Servant of God on 29 October 2007
- María del Rosario Egido Izquierdo (Mercedes de Jesús) (29 March 1935 – 3 August 2004), professed religious, declared as a Servant of God on 26 January 2011
