= Beatrice of Silva =

Christian saint

Saint Beatrice of Silva OIC
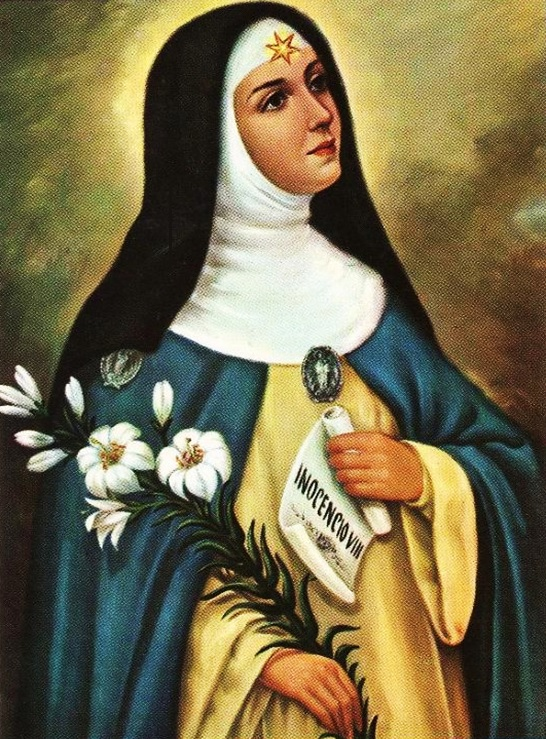

Virgin
- Born: ca. 1424; Campo Maior, Alentejo Region, Kingdom of Portugal
- Died: 16 August 1492; Toledo, Crown of Castile
- Venerated in: Catholic Church (Conceptionist & Franciscan Orders, Spain & Portugal)
- Beatified: 28 July 1926, Rome by Pope Pius XI
- Canonized: 3 October 1976, Vatican City by Pope Paul VI
- Major shrine: Monastery of the Immaculate Conception, Toledo, Spain
- Feast: 17 August (1 September in the Franciscan Order)

Beatrice of Silva (Campo Maior, Portugal ca. 1424 – Toledo, Castile, 16 August 1492), born Beatriz de Menezes da Silva, was a Portuguese noblewoman who became the foundress of the monastic Order of the Immaculate Conception (known as the Conceptionists). Amadeus of Portugal's younger sister, she is honored as a saint by the Roman Catholic Church.

== Life ==
Beatrice was one of the eleven children of Rui Gomes da Silva, the governor of Campo Maior, Portugal, and of Isabel de Menezes, an illegitimate daughter of Dom Pedro de Menezes, 1st Count of Vila Real and 2nd Count of Viana do Alentejo, in whose army her father was serving at the time of her birth. One of her brothers was Amadeus of Portugal, a noted reformer of the Order of Friars Minor. She was long thought to have been born in the Portuguese enclave of Ceuta in North Africa, where her father was serving as a military commander at that time. Modern research has determined that she was, in fact, born in the family home at Campo Maior.

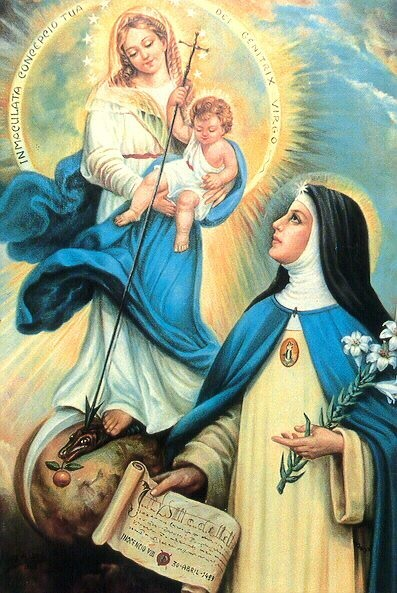
Saint Beatrice of Silva experienced an apparition of the Blessed Virgin Mary

Beatrice was raised in the castle of Infante John, Lord of Reguengos de Monsaraz. In 1447 Beatrice accompanied his daughter, Princess Isabel of Portugal, to Castile as her lady-in-waiting when Isabel left to marry King John II of Castile and became Queen of Castile and León. Beatrice was her good and close friend, (and later was to receive her support when she founded the Conceptionists). Soon, however, her great beauty began to arouse the irrational jealousy of the Queen, who had her imprisoned in a tiny cell. During this incarceration, Beatrice experienced an apparition of the Blessed Virgin Mary, in which she was instructed to found a new religious order in Mary's honor.

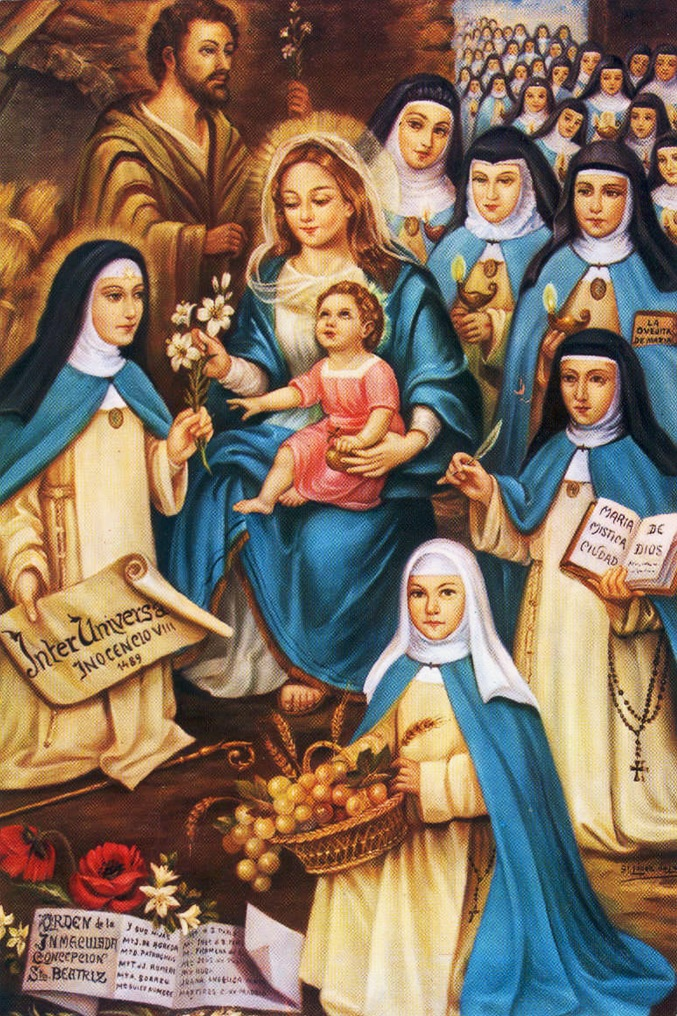
Saint Beatrice was the foundress of the Order of the Immaculate Conception

Beatrice finally escaped her imprisonment with difficulty and took refuge in the Dominican Second Order monastery of nuns in Toledo. Here she led a life of holiness for thirty-seven years, without becoming a member of that order. In 1484 Beatrice, with some companions, took possession of a palace in Toledo set apart for them by Queen Isabella I of Castile for the new community under the name Monastery of the Holy Faith, which was to be dedicated to honoring the Immaculate Conception of Mary.

In 1489, by permission of Pope Innocent VIII, the nuns adopted the Cistercian Rule, bound themselves to the daily recitation of the office of the Immaculate Conception, and were placed under obedience to the ordinary of the archdiocese. The foundress determined on the religious habit, which is white, with a white scapular and blue mantle, with a medallion of Mary under her title of the Immaculate Conception.

Beatrice died in the monastery she had founded on 16 August 1492. Her remains are still venerated in the chapel of that monastery.

== Legacy ==
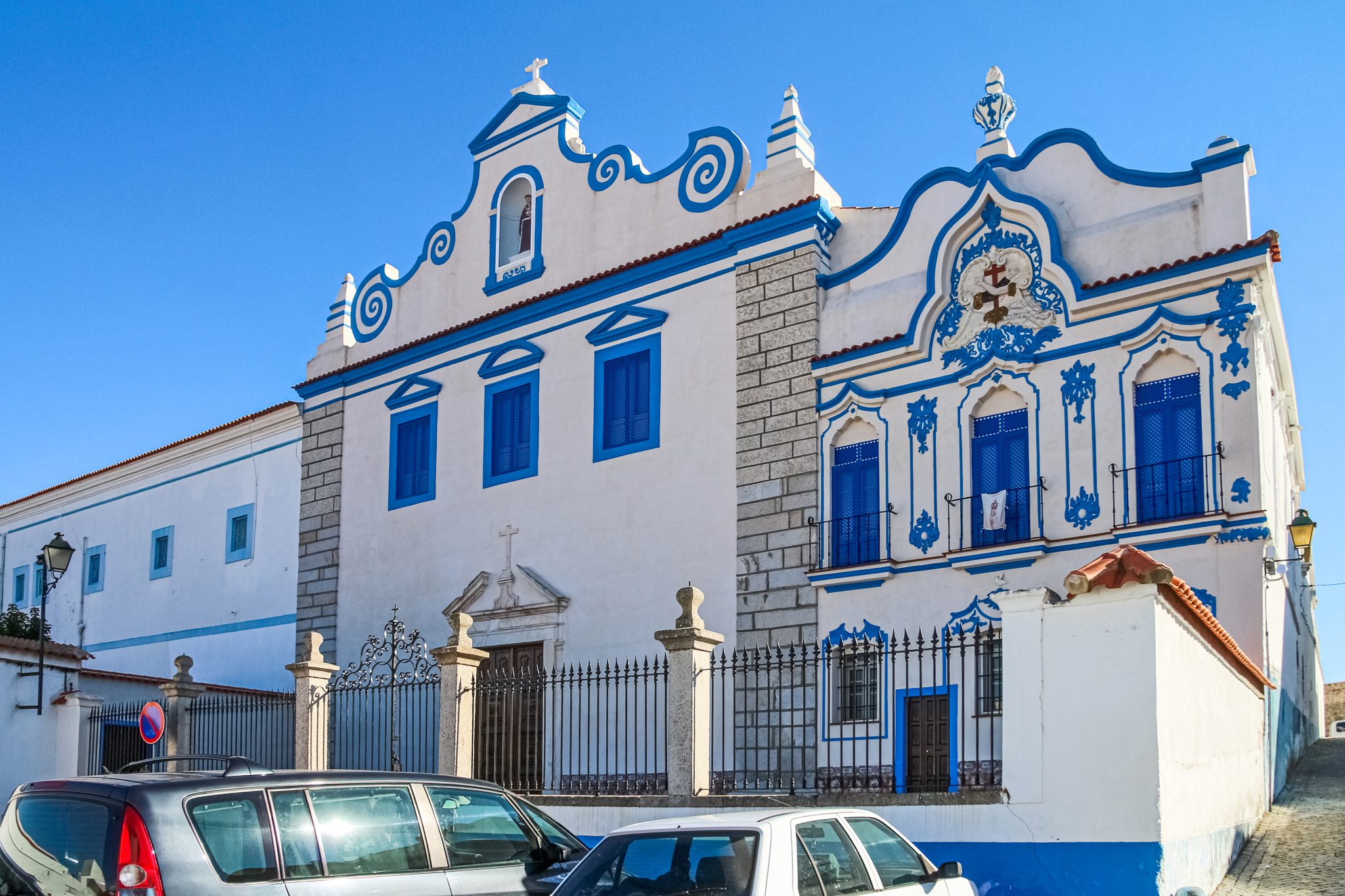
Conceptionists monastery in Campo Maior, Portugal, birthplace of Beatrice of Silva

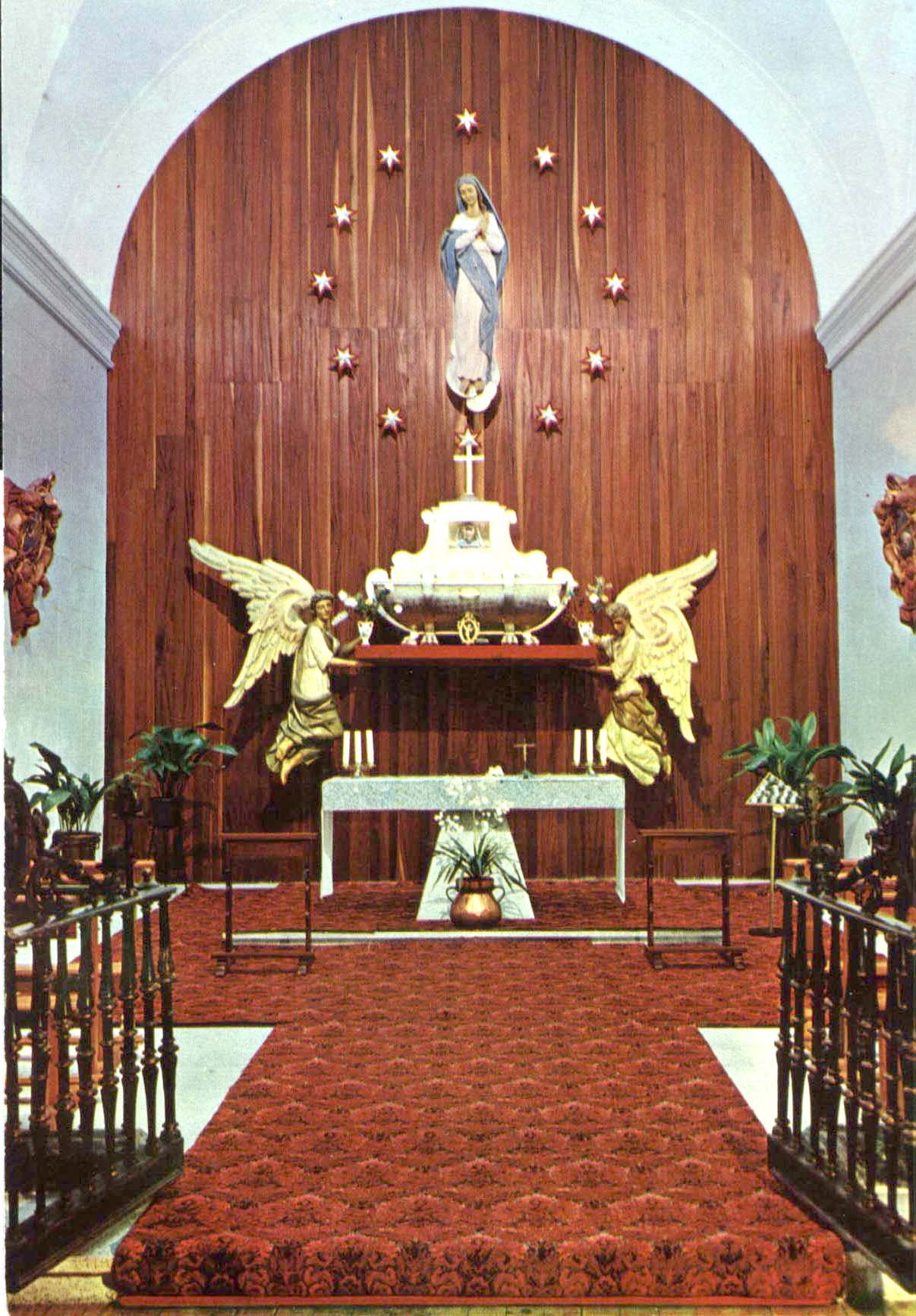
Tomb of Saint Beatrice of Silva in Toledo, Spain

In 1501 Pope Alexander VI united the nuns of the Monastery of the Holy Faith, which Beatrice had founded, with the neighboring Benedictine Monastery of San Pedro de las Duenas, and put them all under the Rule of St. Clare. Through this, the order became connected with the Franciscans. Pope Julius II gave the new order a rule of life of its own in 1511, and in 1516 special constitutions were drawn up for the new order by the Franciscan Cardinal Francisco de Quiñones, who resolved some ongoing tensions between the nuns of Santa Fe and the former Benedictine nuns who had been fused into the order, establishing the community as the Monastery of the Immaculate Conception.

A second monastery was founded in 1507 at Torrigo, from which, in turn, were established seven others. The order soon spread through Portugal, Spain, and their colonies in South America—as early as 1540, as well as in Italy, and France. (Note: The Brazilian community would later separate from the monastic Order and become the Missionary Sisters of the Immaculate Conception of the Mother of God, belonging to the Third Order Regular of St. Francis.) At its height, there were some 200 monasteries of the order throughout the world.

== Veneration ==
Beatrice de Menezes da Silva was beatified on 28 July 1926 by Pope Pius XI. The cause for her sainthood was opened on 26 February 1950, and she was canonized by Pope Paul VI in 1976. Her feast day is celebrated by both by the Conceptionist nuns and the Franciscan Order and in Spain on 1 September, but in 2012 was transferred to 17 August for Portugal.

== See also ==
- De Silva Fernández de Híjar Portugal family
