= Marquess of Cáceres =

Hereditary title in the peerage of Spain

Marquessate of Cáceres
- Creation date: 10 April 1790
- Created by: Charles V
- Peerage: Peerage of Spain
- First holder: Juan García de Cáceres y Montemayor, 1st Marquess of Cáceres
- Present holder: Juan María Noguera y Merle, 8th Marquess of Cáceres

Marquess of Cáceres (Spanish: Marqués de Cáceres) is a hereditary title in the peerage of Spain accompanied by the dignity of Grandee of Spain, bestowed originally on the peerage of the Kingdom of Naples on Juan García de Cáceres, frigate captain of the Royal Armada, by King Charles IV on 10 April 1790.

French viticulturist Henri Forner named his eponymous wine brand after one of his main investors, the 7th Marquess.

== Marquesses of Cáceres (1790) ==
- Juan García de Cáceres y Montemayor, 1st Marquess of Cáceres
- Juan Antonio García de Cáceres y Aliaga, 2nd Marquess of Cáceres (d. 1807)
- Vicente Joaquín Noguera y Climent, 3rd Marquess of Cáceres (1759–1836)
- Vicente Noguera y Sotolongo, 4th Marquess of Cáceres (1811–1889)
- Vicente Mariano Noguera y Aquavera, 5th Marquess of Cáceres (1857–1919)
- Juan Bautista Noguera Yanguas, 6th Marquess of Cáceres (1884–1936)
- Vicente Noguera y Espinosa de los Monteros, 7th Marquess of Cáceres (1917–1979)
- Juan María Noguera y Merle, 8th Marquess of Cáceres (b. 1946)

== See also ==
- Bodegas Marqués de Cáceres
- List of current grandees of Spain
