= Marques de Caceres =

Wine producer based in Spain

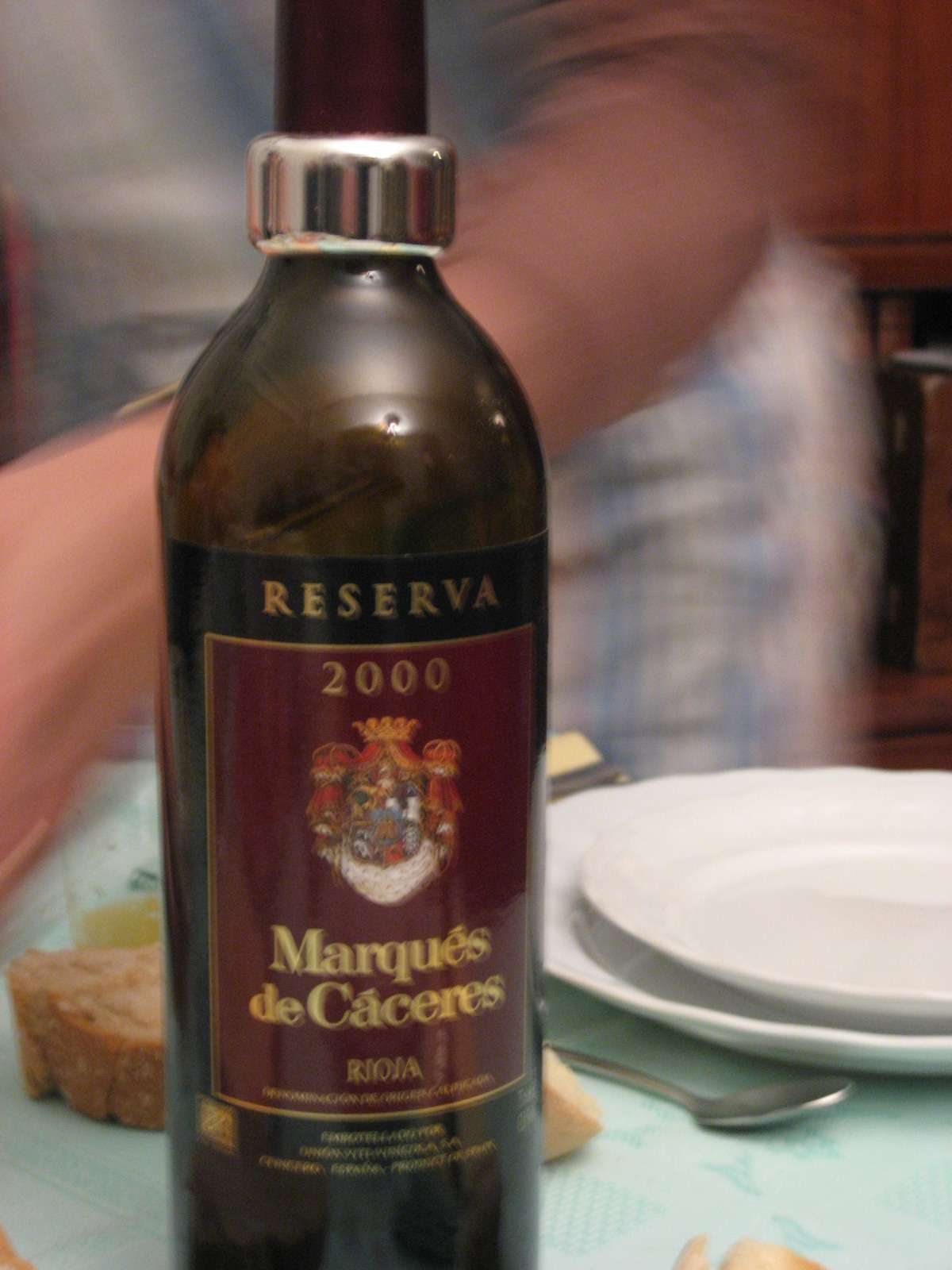
A bottle of Rioja from the 2000 harvest

Marqués de Cáceres is a wine producer based in Cenicero, Rioja Alta, Spain. Their wines are among the most widely distributed Spanish brand wines in the United States.

The winery was founded in 1970 by Henri Forner at Cenicero in Rioja Alta, and named the after his main investor, Vicente Noguera y Espinosa de los Monteros, 7th Marquess of Cáceres. Forner's wine-making family had fled to France during the Spanish Civil War. The first wines were released in 1975.

== See also ==
- Marquess of Cáceres (title)
