= Marquess of Villamejor =

Marquessate of Villamejor
- Creation date: 5 March 1718
- Created by: Charles VI, Holy Roman Emperor
- Peerage: Peerage of Spain
- First holder: José Antonio de Torres Mesía y Morales, 1st Marquess of Villamejor
- Present holder: Mónica de Figueroa y Cernuda, 11th Marchioness of Villamejor

Marquess of Villamejor (Spanish: Marqués de Villamejor) is a hereditary title in the peerage of Spain, granted in 1718 by Charles VI, Holy Roman Emperor to José Antonio de Torres Mesía, once he had renounced the throne of Spain following the War of Spanish Succession. The title was confirmed in the peerage of Spain in 1726 by Philip V.

== Marquesses of Villamejor (1718) ==
- José Antonio de Torres Mesía y Morales, 1st Marquess of Villamejor
- Manuel María de Torres y Dávalos, 2nd Marquess of Villamejor
- José Tomás de Torres y Velasco, 3rd Marquess of Villamejor
- José María de Torres y Bastida, 4th Marquess of Villamejor
- José Silvestre de Torres y Tovar, 5th Marquess of Villamejor
- Ana Josefa de Torres y Romo, 6th Marchioness of Villamejor
- Gonzalo de Figueroa y Torres, 7th Marquess of Villamejor
- Gonzalo de Figueroa y O'Neill, 8th Marquess of Villamejor
- Jaime de Figueroa y O'Neill, 9th Marquess of Villamejor
- Jaime de Figueroa y Castro, 10th Marquess of Villamejor
- Mónica de Figueroa y Cernuda, 11th Marchioness of Villamejor

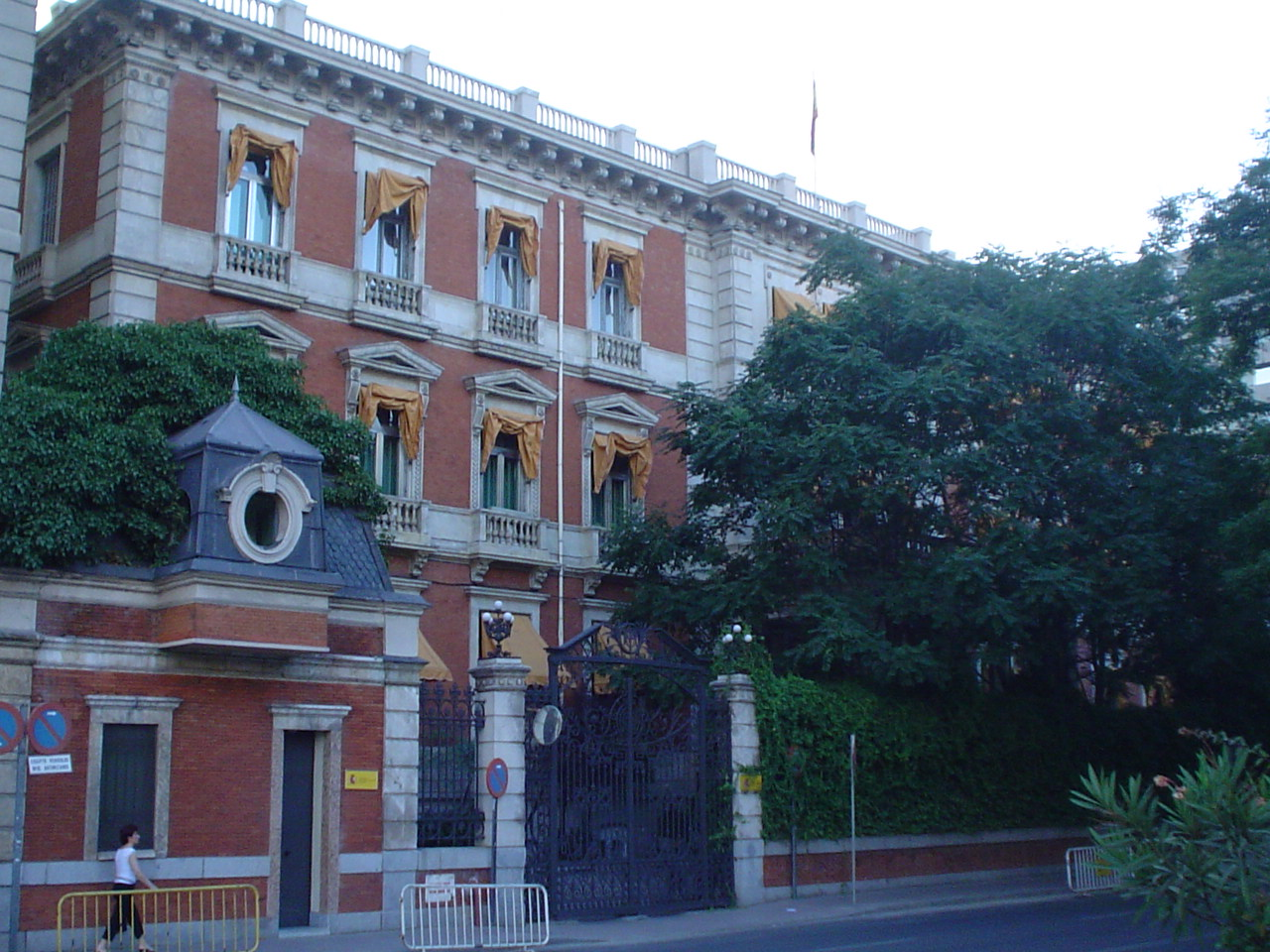
Palace of the Marquesses of Villamejor in Madrid

== See also ==
- Marquess of Villabrágima
- Marquess of San Damián
- Count of Yebes
- Count of Velayos
