= The Parasol =

Painting by Francisco de Goya

- El Quitasol (Spanish)
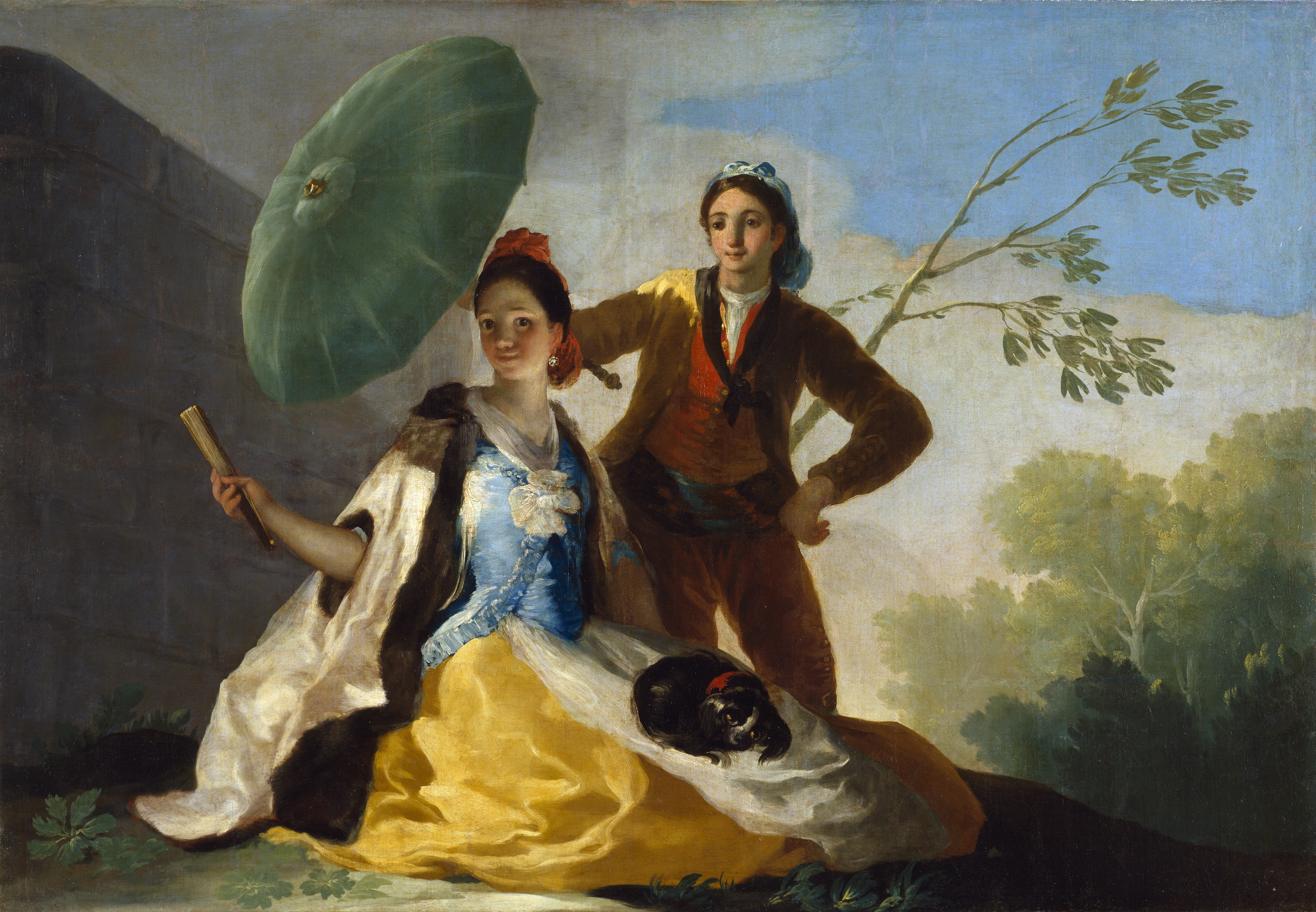
- Artist: Goya
- Year: c. 1777
- Type: Oil on linen
- Dimensions: 104 cm × 152 cm (40 3/4 in × 59 1/4 in)
- Location: Museo del Prado; Madrid

The Parasol (also known as El Quitasol) is one of a cartoon series of oil on linen paintings made by the painter Francisco Goya. This series of paintings was specifically made in order to be transformed into tapestries that would be hung on the walls of the Royal Palace of El Pardo in Madrid, Spain. The tapestries showed serene events in everyday life, which made them a nice addition to the dining room of Prince and Princess of Asturias—the future King Charles IV and Maria Luisa of Parma. The queen called on Goya because she wanted to decorate the dining room with cheerful scenes; The Parasol and the other tapestry paintings were Goya's response to this request. The painting is now in the Museo del Prado in Madrid as is another in the series, Blind man's bluff.

== Description of the painting ==
In his paintings, Goya often joins French fashion to the Spanish one. The woman in this particular painting is sitting on the ground, possibly resting from a long walk. She is dressed in French style, according to the time period. She is holding a fan in her right hand, while a little dog is cuddled in her lap. The young man is holding the parasol in order to shade the woman's face. He is dressed in the so-called majo style, meaning he is dressed like a poor person for the time period. His hair gathered in a net, and his belt is made of colorful silk. In the background we can see dark clouds in the sky and the trees swaying in the wind, possibly signaling a storm coming. The painting emits a very calm warmth, which is then offset by the tree that seems to be blowing in pretty strong wind. The way the boy is standing, with one foot on the rock and one not, he seems to be triumphantly shading the woman from the harmful rays of the sun, and the possible storm.

== Influences ==
From 1775 to 1792 Goya painted his cartoons (designs) for the tapestries. This was his first genre of paintings and possibly the most important period in his artistic development. Painting the tapestries helped Goya become a keen observer of human behavior, which helped him paint his future paintings. Goya was influenced by Neoclassicism, which was gaining favor over the Rococo style at the time. This particular painting is considered classicism for its relation to everyday life. Around this same time, Goya began painting portraits for many of the Spanish Monarchs. This was his first popular success that ultimately changed his career. He was then elected to the Royal Academy of San Fernando in 1780, named painter to the king in 1786, and made a court painter in 1789.

== See also ==
- The Boar Hunt, an early Goya tapestry cartoon
- Francisco Goya's tapestry cartoons
- List of Francisco Goya's tapestry cartoons
- List of works by Francisco Goya
