= Eduardo de Figueroa, 8th Count of Yebes =

Spanish aristocrat, architect, politician and writer

The Most Illustrious The Count of Yebes
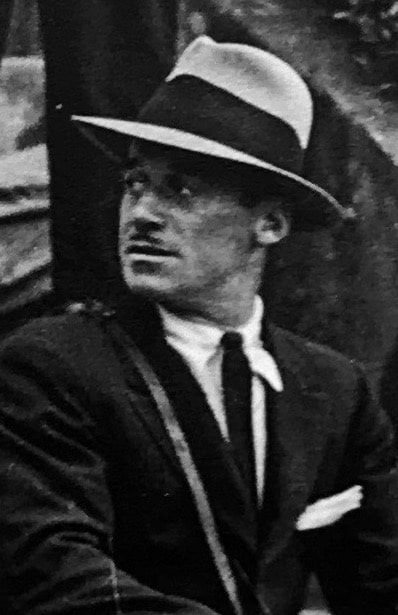
- Pictured in San Sebastián, 1927
- Born: 20 September 1899; Madrid, Spain
- Died: 11 July 1984 (aged 84); Madrid, Spain
- Spouse: Carmen Muñoz y Roca-Tallada (m. 1922)
- Children: 2
- Parents: Alvaro de Figueroa y Torres, 1st Count of Romanones (father); Casilda Alonso-Martínez y Martín (mother)

Eduardo de Figueroa y Alonso-Martínez, 8th Count of Yebes (20 September 1899 – 11 July 1984) was a Spanish aristocrat, architect, politician and writer. He was a member of parliament for Barbastro, fellow of the Real Academia de Bellas Artes de San Fernando and president of the National Board of Trophy Hunting Homologation.

== Early life ==
He was born in Madrid as the sixth child of Alvaro de Figueroa y Torres, 1st Count of Romanones, who was Prime Minister of Spain, and his wife Casilda Alonso-Martínez y Martín, the daughter of Manuel Alonso Martínez. He had six siblings: Casilda, Luis, Álvaro, Carlos, José and Agustín. His brother Álvaro was Mayor of Madrid between 1921 and 1922, José won a silver medal in polo at the 1920 Summer Olympics and Agustín was a successful movie director, and the father-in-law of singer Raphael.

== Hunting ==
Yebes has gone down as one of the most well-known hunters of the 20th century. His book Veinte Años de Caza Mayor (Twenty Years of Big Game Hunting) was prologued by Ortega y Gasset and is still considered one of the gems of hunting literature. He was described as "tough and wiry and willing to work for his trophy despite being a nobleman".

Amongst his achievements are harvesting the current world record giant sable antelope in Angola in 1949, currently on show at the Museo Nacional de Ciencias Naturales. He was also the first to document the existence of the Iberian ibex in the Penibaetic System.

Yebes was a passionate roe deer hunter since his finca, El Robledo, had a plentiful population.

He was made Honorific President of the Royal Hunting Federation of Spain and founded the National Board of Trophy Hunting Homologation with fellow hunters in 1950, a body of which he was the first president.

He died in Madrid in July 1984.

== Issue ==
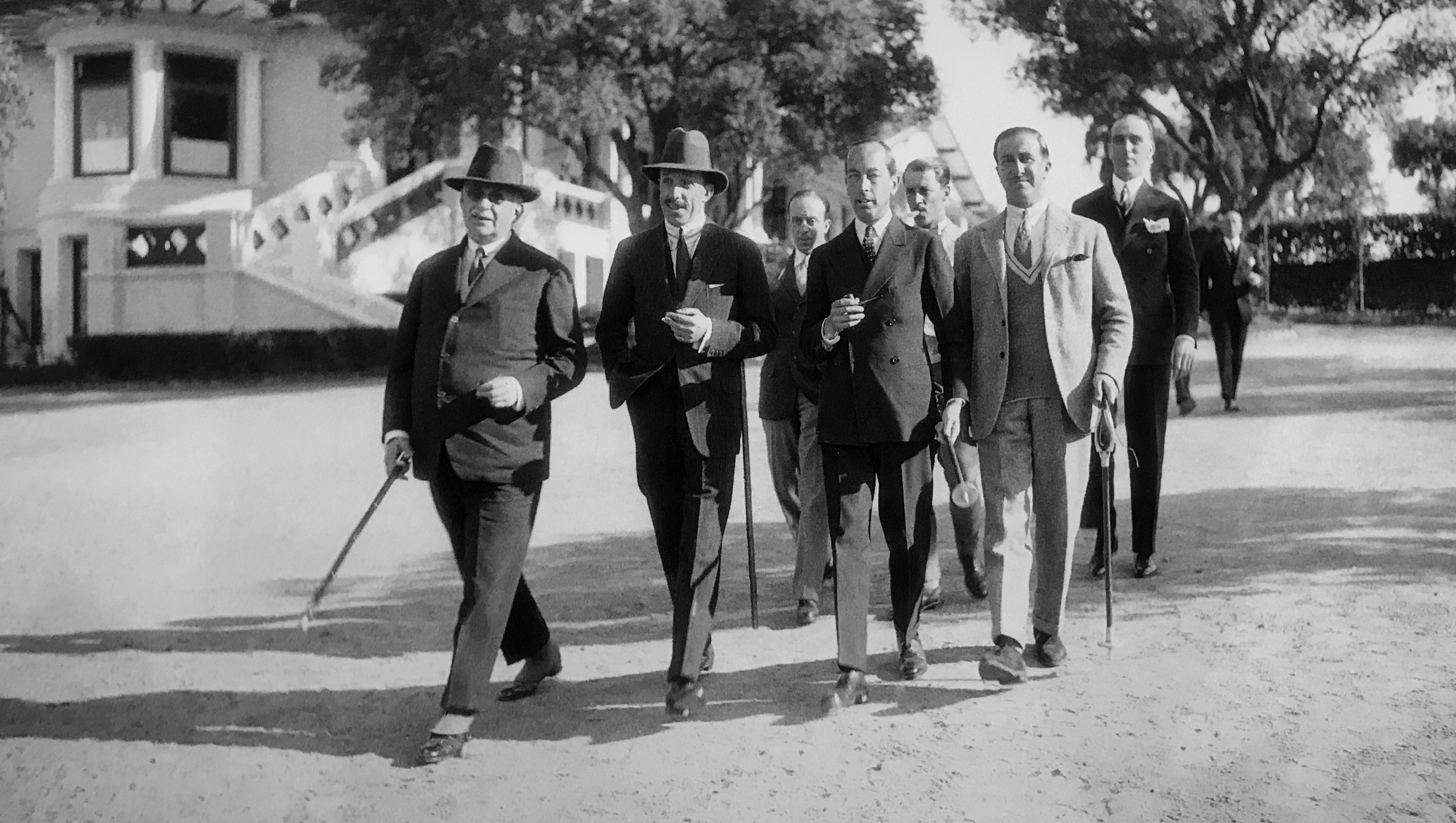
Spain Golf Open at Real Club de la Puerta de Hierro. Yebes is in the middle of the back row, smoking a cigar, 1928

On 3 July 1922, he married Carmen Muñoz y Roca-Tallada at San Fermín de los Navarros in Madrid. They had two children:

- Mercedes de Figueroa y Muñoz (b. 1924)
- María del Carmen de Figueroa y Muñoz, 9th Countess of Yebes (b. 1929)

== Title ==
- 8th Count of Yebes

== Selected works ==
- 20 Años de Caza Mayor, Plus Ultra, Madrid, 1948.

== Bibliography ==
- Priego, Count of (2017). Cazadores Españoles del Siglo XX. Turner Publicaciones. ISBN 978-84-16714-29-2.
- Walker, John Frederick (2004). A Certain Curve of Horn: The Hundred-Year Quest for the Giant Sable Antelope of Angola. Grove Press. ISBN 978-08-02140-68-5.

Spanish nobility
Preceded by Alvaro de Figueroa y Torres	Count of Yebes; 1922 – 1984	Succeeded by Carmen de Figueroa y Muñoz
