= Marquess of Del Bosque =

Noble Spanish hereditary title

- Creation date: 3 February 2011
- Created by: Juan Carlos I
- Peerage: Spanish nobility
- First holder: Vicente del Bosque
- Present holder: Vicente del Bosque González
- Heir apparent: Vicente del Bosque López
- Remainder to: heirs of the body of the grantee according to absolute primogeniture
- Status: Extant

Marquess of Del Bosque (Spanish: Marqués de Del Bosque) is a hereditary title in the Spanish nobility. The marquessate was bestowed by King Juan Carlos I upon Vicente del Bosque to honor his contribution to Spanish sport. Del Bosque led Spain to their first ever World Cup title at the 2010 competition in South Africa.

His style of address is: Ilustrísimo Señor Marqués de Del Bosque ("The Most Illustrious The Marquess of Del Bosque").

== Creation ==
On 4 February 2011, the Official State Gazette published the following decree:

The great dedication to Spanish sport and the contribution of Mr. Vicente del Bosque González to the promotion of sporting values, deserves to be recognized in a special way, so, wanting to show him my Royal appreciation,
I grant him the title of Marquess of Del Bosque, for him and his successors, in accordance with Spanish nobility law.

— JUAN CARLOS R., Royal Decree n.º 135 of 3 February 2011.

== Marquesses of Del Bosque ==
- Vicente del Bosque González, 1st Marquess of Del Bosque (since 2011)

== Current holder ==
Vicente del Bosque, 1st Marquess of Del Bosque (born 23 December 1950), is a retired football manager and former player. Close to Real Madrid, a team he played and coached; he is best known for his success as manager of Spain national football team, winning the 2010 FIFA World Cup and the UEFA Euro 2012. Del Bosque met María de la Santísima Trinidad López in the 1970s, and they married in 1986, in a civil ceremony in Madrid. They have three children: Vicente, Álvaro and Gema and a grandchildren: Vicente.

== Line of succession ==
- Vicente del Bosque González, 1st Marquess of Del Bosque (b. 1950)
  - (1). Vicente del Bosque López (b. 1987)
    - (2). Vicente del Bosque Pérez (b. 2017)
  - (3). Álvaro del Bosque López (b. 1989)
  - (4). Gema del Bosque López (b. 1993)

== See also ==
- Marquess of Ibias
- Marquess of Vargas Llosa
- Marquess of Villar Mir
