= Leopoldo Sainz de la Maza =

Spanish polo player

Leopoldo Saínz de la Maza
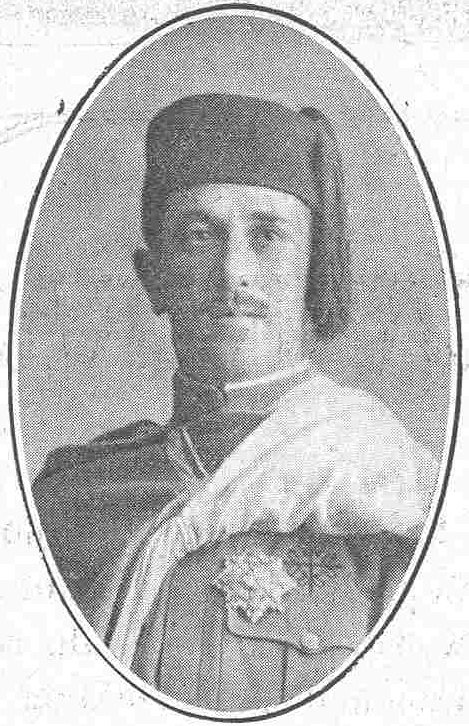
- 1916

Personal information
- Birth name: Leopoldo Saínz de la Maza Gutiérrez-Solana y Gómez de la Puente
- Born: 23 December 1879; Utrera, Spain
- Died: 6 February 1954 (aged 74); Morón de la Frontera, Spain

Sport
- Sport: Polo

Leopoldo Saínz de la Maza Gutiérrez-Solana y Gómez de la Puente, 1st Count of la Maza (23 December 1879 – 6 February 1954) was a Spanish polo player. He competed at the 1920 Summer Olympics and the 1924 Summer Olympics, winning a silver medal in 1920.

== See also ==
- Count of la Maza
