= Count of Torre Arias =

Countship of Torre Arias
- Creation date: 25 May 1761
- Created by: Charles III
- Peerage: Peerage of Spain
- First holder: María Francisca Colón de Larreátegui y Ximénez de Embún, 1st Countess of Torre Arias
- Present holder: Vacant
- Heir apparent: Juan José Mesía y Medina, 6th Duke of Galisteo

Count of Torre Arias (Spanish: Conde de Torre Arias) is a hereditary title in the Peerage of Spain, accompanied by the dignity of Grandee and granted in 1761 by Charles III to María Francisca Colón de Larreátegui, in memory of her father, Pedro Colón de Larreátegui, knight of the Order of Alcántara.

== Counts of Torre Arias (1761) ==
- María Francisca Colón de Larreátegui y Ximénez de Embún, 1st Countess of Torre Arias
- Cayetano Pedro Golfín de Carvajal y Colón de Larreátegui, 2nd Count of Torre Arias
- ?
- Petra Golfín de Carvajal y de las Casas, 4th Countess of Torre Arias
- María de la Concepción de Gordón y Golfín de Carvajal, 5th Countess of Torre Arias
- Ildefonso Pérez de Guzmán y Gordón, 6th Count of Torre Arias
- Alfonso Pérez de Guzmán y Salabert, 7th Count of Torre Arias
- Tatiana Pérez de Guzmán y Seebacher, 8th Countess of Torre Arias
- José Luis Mesía y Figueroa, 9th Count of Torre Arias

== See also ==
- List of current grandees of Spain
