= Marquess of Torre Soto de Briviesca =

Spanish hereditary title

Marquessate of Torre Soto de Briviesca
- Creation date: 10 February 1918
- Created by: Alfonso XIII
- Peerage: Peerage of Spain
- First holder: Pedro Nolasco y González de Soto, 1st Marquess of Torre Soto de Briviesca
- Present holder: Pedro Nolasco y López de Carrizosa, 4th Marquess of Torre Soto de Briviesca

Marquess of Torre Soto de Briviesca (Spanish: Marqués de Torre Soto de Briviesca), commonly known as Marquess of Torre Soto, is a hereditary title in the Peerage of Spain, granted in 1918 by Alfonso XIII to Pedro Nolasco, knight of the Order of Charles III and Gentilhombre of the king.

== Marquesses of Torre Soto de Briviesca (1918) ==
- Pedro Nolasco y González de Soto, 1st Marquess of Torre Soto de Briviesca (1849-1946)
- Pedro Nolasco y Gordon, 2nd Marquess of Torre Soto de Briviesca (1878-1967), son of the 1st Marquess
- Pedro Nolasco y Díez, 3rd Marquess of Torre Soto de Briviesca (1912-2014), son of the 2nd Marquess
- Pedro Nolasco y López de Carrizosa, 4th Marquess of Torre Soto de Briviesca, son of the 3rd Marquess

== See also ==
- Jerez de la Frontera
