= Marquis of San Felices de Aragón =

Marquessate of San Felices de Aragón
- Creation date: 9 July 1634
- Created by: Philip III
- Peerage: Peerage of Spain
- First holder: Francisca de Gurrea y Ximénez-Cerdán, 1st Marchioness of San Felices de Aragón
- Present holder: María de los Reyes Álvarez de Toledo y Mencos, 12th Marchioness of San Felices de Aragón

Marquis of San Felices de Aragón (Spanish: Marqués de San Felices de Aragón) is a hereditary title in the Peerage of Spain, granted in 1634 by Philip III to Francisca de Gurrea, in memory of her widow Miguel de Moncayo y Celdrán.

== Marquises of San Felices de Aragón (1634) ==
- Francisca de Gurrea y Ximénez-Cerdán, 1st Marchioness of San Felices de Aragón
- Juan de Moncayo y Gurrea, 2nd Marquis of San Felices de Aragón
- José Lorenzo de Aragón y Gurrea, 3rd Marquis of San Felices de Aragón
- José Claudio de Aragón y Castro Pinós, 4th Marquis of San Felices de Aragón
- ?
- ?
- ?
- ?
- Luis Rebolledo de Palafox y Melci, 9th Marquis of San Felices de Aragón
- María de la Blanca Mencos y Rebolledo de Palafox, 10th Marchioness of San Felices de Aragón
- Alonso Cristiano Álvarez de Toledo y Mencos, 11th Marquis of San Felices de Aragón
- María de los Reyes Álvarez de Toledo y Mencos, 12th Marchioness of San Felices de Aragón

== See also ==
- Spanish nobility
