= Marquess of Larios =

Marquessate of Larios
- Creation date: 11 October 1865
- Created by: Isabella II
- Peerage: Peerage of Spain
- First holder: Martín Larios y Herreros, 1st Marquess of Larios
- Present holder: José Carlos Fernández de Villavicencio y Eleta, 6th Marquess of Larios

Marquess of Larios (Spanish: Marqués de Larios) is a hereditary title in the Peerage of Spain, granted in 1865 by Isabella II to Martín Larios, senator of the kingdom and one of the most important industrial businessmen in 19th century Spain.

== Marquesses of Larios (1865) ==
- Martín Larios y Herreros, 1st Marquess of Larios
- Manuel Domingo Larios y Larios, 2nd Marquess of Larios
- José Aurelio Larios y Larios, 3rd Marquess of Larios
- José Antonio Larios y Franco, 4th Marquess of Larios
- José Larios y Fernández de Villavicencio, 5th Marquess of Larios
- José Carlos Fernández de Villavicencio, 6th Marquess of Larios

== See also ==
- Spanish nobility
