= Marquess of Silvela =

Marquessate of Silvela
- Creation date: 19 April 1915
- Created by: Alfonso XIII
- Peerage: Peerage of Spain
- First holder: Amalia Loring y Heredia, 1st Marchioness of Silvela
- Present holder: Victoria Silvela y Faget, 5th Marchioness of Silvela

Marquess of Silvela (Spanish: Marqués de Silvela) is a hereditary title of nobility in the Peerage of Spain accompanied by the dignity of Grandee. It was bestowed by Alfonso XIII on Amalia Loring, in memory of her late husband, Francisco Silvela, who was Prime Minister of Spain.

== Marquesses of Silvela (1915) ==
- Amalia Loring y Heredia, 1st Marchioness of Silvela
- Jorge Silvela y Loring, 2nd Marquess of Silvela
- Francisco Silvela y Montero de Espinosa, 3rd Marquess of Silvela
- Jorge Silvela y Barcáiztegui, 4th Marquess of Silvela
- Victoria Silvela y Faget, 5th Marchioness of Silvela

== See also ==
- List of grandees of Spain

== Bibliography ==
- Hidalgos de España, Real Asociación de (2018). Elenco de Grandezas y Títulos Nobiliarios Españoles. Ediciones Hidalguía. ISBN 978-84-94841-02-6.
