= Count of Yebes =

Countship of Yebes
- Creation date: 26 September 1649
- Created by: Philip IV
- Peerage: Peerage of Spain
- First holder: Juan Esteban Imbrea y Franquis, 1st Count of Yebes
- Present holder: Pedro Tur de Montis y Hornedo, 12th Count of Yebes

Count of Yebes (Spanish: Conde de Yebes) is a hereditary title in the Peerage of Spain, granted in 1649 by Philip IV to Juan Esteban Imbrea, Lord of Yebes and Valdarachas, knight of the Order of Calatrava.

The title was unofficially held by Imbrea's descendants in Genoa, who never paid the inheritance taxes in the peerage of Spain. Thus, the title became vacant for more than two centuries until it was rehabilitated in 1922 by Alfonso XIII to the most legitimate descendant, Álvaro de Figueroa, 1st Count of Romanones, who was Prime Minister of Spain in 1912.

== Counts of Yebes (1649) ==
- Juan Esteban Imbrea y Franquis, 1st Count of Yebes
- Michele Camillo Pallavicini Invrea, Margrave Pallavicini & 2nd Count of Yebes
- ?
- ?
- ?
- ?

== Counts of Yebes (1922) ==
- Álvaro de Figueroa y Torres, 7th Count of Yebes (1863-1950), direct descendant of the 1st Count
- Eduardo de Figueroa y Alonso-Martínez, 8th Count of Yebes (1899-1984), son of the 7th Count
- Carmen de Figueroa y Muñoz, 9th Countess of Yebes (1929-2002), daughter of the 8th Count
- José Eduardo Tur de Montis y Figueroa, 10th Count of Yebes (d. 2008), son of the 9th Countess
- Francisco de Asís Tur de Montis y Figueroa, 11th Count of Yebes (1958-2019), brother of the 10th Count
- Pedro Tur de Montis y Hornedo, 12th Count of Yebes (b. 1993), son of the 11th Count

== See also ==
- Count of Velayos
- Marquess of Villabrágima
- Marquess of San Damián

== Bibliography ==
- Hidalgos de España, Real Asociación de (2018). Elenco de Grandezas y Títulos Nobiliarios Españoles. Ediciones Hidalguía. ISBN 978-84-94841-02-6.
