= Count of San Esteban de Cañongo =

Countship of San Esteban de Cañongo
- Creation date: 7 July 1816
- Created by: Ferdinand VII
- Peerage: Peerage of Spain
- First holder: Agustín José Ramón Valdés y Pedroso, 1st Count of San Esteban de Cañongo
- Present holder: María de la Luz de Pedroso y Fernández de Córdoba, 9th Countess of San Esteban de Cañongo

Count of San Esteban de Cañongo (Spanish: Conde de San Esteban de Cañongo) is a hereditary title in the Peerage of Spain, granted in 1816 by Ferdinand VII to Agustín José Ramón Valdés, colonel of the cavalry militias of Habana.

== Counts of San Esteban de Cañongo (1816) ==
- Agustín José Ramón Valdés y Pedroso, 1st Count of San Esteban de Cañongo
- Agustín Martín Valdés y Aróstegui, 2nd Count of San Esteban de Cañongo
- Manuel de Jesús de Peñalver y Valdés, 3rd Count of San Esteban de Cañongo
- Francisco Valdés y Veliz, 4th Count of San Esteban de Cañongo
- Luis de Pedroso y Madan, 5th Count of San Esteban de Cañongo
- María Dolores de Pedroso y Sturdza, 6th Countess of San Esteban de Cañongo
- Margarita de Pedroso y Sturdza, 7th Countess of San Esteban de Cañongo
- Diego de Pedroso y Frost, 8th Count of San Esteban de Cañongo
- María de la Luz de Pedroso y Fernández de Córdoba, 9th Countess of San Esteban de Cañongo

== See also ==
- Spain-Sweden relations
