= José de Figueroa y Alonso-Martínez =

Spanish equestrian

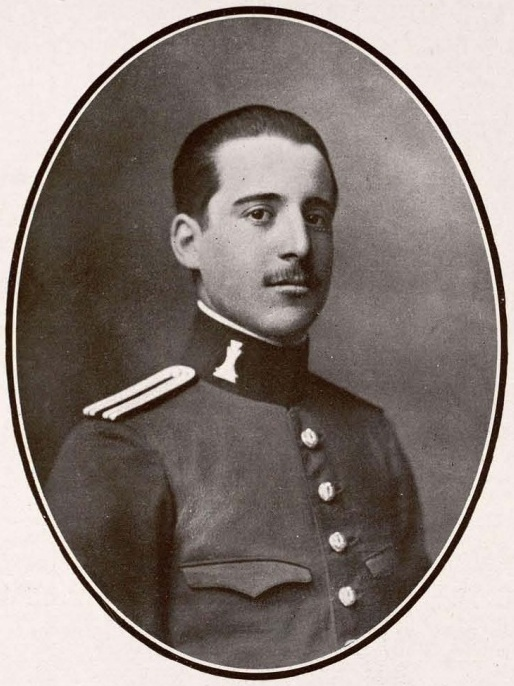
- Photographed by Christian Franzen

Personal information
- Nationality: Spanish
- Born: 24 December 1897 Madrid, Spain
- Died: 20 October 1920 (aged 22) Tafersit, Spanish Morocco

Sport
- Sport: Polo
Medal record
Men's polo
Representing Spain
Summer Olympics
Silver medal – second place	1920 Antwerp

José de Figueroa y Alonso-Martínez (24 December 1897 – 20 October 1920) was a Spanish equestrian who was part of the silver-medal winning Spanish men's polo team in the 1920 Summer Olympics. He was killed in action during the Rif War soon after his Olympic appearance. He was the son of Álvaro de Figueroa, who was Prime Minister of Spain.
