= Count of la Maza =

Spanish Nobel Title

Countship of la Maza
- Creation date: 27 January 1910
- Created by: Alfonso XIII
- Peerage: Peerage of Spain
- First holder: Leopoldo Sainz de la Maza y Gutiérrez-Solana, 1st Count of la Maza
- Present holder: Leopoldo Sainz de la Maza e Ybarra, 3rd Count of la Maza

Count of la Maza (Spanish: Conde de la Maza) is a hereditary title in the Peerage of Spain, granted in 1910 by Alfonso XIII to Leopoldo Sainz de la Maza, one of his mayordomos de semana.

The 1st Count won one of Spain's first olympic medals, a silver in the modality of polo at the 1920 Summer Olympics.

== Counts of la Maza (1910) ==
- Leopoldo Sainz de la Maza y Gutiérrez-Solana, 1st Count of la Maza (1879–1954)
- Leopoldo Sainz de la Maza y Falcó, 2nd Count of la Maza (1928–2002), son of the 1st Count
- Leopoldo Sainz de la Maza e Ybarra, 3rd Count of la Maza (b. 1958), son of the 2nd Count

The heir apparent is the present holder's eldest daughter, Louisa Sainz de la Maza y Lowndes (b. 20 June 1995).

== See also ==
- List of Olympic medalists in polo
