= Marquess of Villabrágima =

Marquessate of Villabrágima
- Creation date: 21 June 1693
- Created by: Charles II
- Peerage: Peerage of Spain
- First holder: Baltasar Enríquez de Cabrera y Álvarez de Toledo, 1st Marquess of Villabrágima
- Present holder: Vacant
- Heir apparent: Virginia de Figueroa y Zapatería

Marquess of Villabrágima (Spanish: Marqués de Villabrágima) is a hereditary title in the Peerage of Spain, granted in 1693 by Charles II to Baltasar Enríquez de Cabrera, knight of the Order of Santiago and grandson of the Duke of Medina de Rioseco.

At the death of the 1st marquess, the title became vacant until Alfonso XIII rehabilitated it in 1914 on behalf of Álvaro de Figueroa y Alonso-Martínez, son of the Count of Romanones and a descendant of the first marquess.

The title makes reference to the town of Villabrágima in Valladolid.

== Marquesses of Villabrágima (1693) ==
- Baltasar Enríquez de Cabrera y Álvarez de Toledo, 1st Marquess of Villabrágima (b. 1650)

== Marquesses of Villabrágima (1914) ==
- Álvaro de Figueroa y Alonso-Martínez, 2nd Marquess of Villabrágima (1893–1959), direct descendant of the 1st Marquess
- Álvaro de Figueroa y Fernández de Liencres, 3rd Marquess of Villabrágima (b. 1918), son of the 2nd Marquess

== See also ==
- House of Enríquez
- Count of Yebes
- Count of Velayos
- Marquess of San Damián
