= Count of Velayos =

Spanish hereditary title

Countship of Dehesa de Velayos
- Creation date: 22 August 1709
- Created by: Philip V
- Peerage: Peerage of Spain
- First holder: Fernando de Torres y Messía, 1st Count of Velayos
- Present holder: Álvaro de Figueroa y Domecq, 9th Count of Velayos

Count of Dehesa de Velayos (Spanish: Conde de la Dehesa de Velayos), commonly known as Count of Velayos is a hereditary title in the Peerage of Spain, granted in 1709 by Philip V to Fernando de Torres, governor of Potosí in the Viceroyalty of Peru.

At the death of the 5th count, the title became vacant until Alfonso XIII rehabilitated it on behalf of Luis de Figueroa y Alonso-Martínez, son of the Count of Romanones and a descendant of the last count.

== Counts of Dehesa de Velayos (1709) ==
- Fernando de Torres y Messía, 1st Count of Velayos (b. 1660)
- Miguel de Torres-Messía y Vivanco, 2nd Count of Velayos (b. 1680), son of the 1st Count
- Carlos Fernando de Torres-Messía y Pérez-Manrique, 3rd Count of Velayos (d. 1780), son of the 2nd Count
- Juan Félix Tello de Guzmán y Torres-Messía, 4th Count of Velayos (b. 1734), nephew of the 3nd Count
- Juan Félix Tello de Guzmán y Ceballos, 5th Count of Velayos (1772–1813), son of the 4th Count

== Counts of Dehesa de Velayos (1914) ==
- Luis de Figueroa y Alonso-Martínez, 6th Count of Velayos (1890–1963), direct descendant of the 5th Count
- Luis de Figueroa y Pérez de Guzmán, 7th Count of Velayos (1918–1987), son of the 6th Count
- Álvaro de Figueroa y Griffith, 8th Count of Velayos (b. 1949), son of the 7th Count
- Álvaro de Figueroa y Domecq, 9th Count of Velayos (b. 1980), son of the 8th Count

== See also ==
- Viceroyalty of Peru
- Count of Yebes
- Marquess of San Damián
- Marquess of Villabrágima
