= The Boar Hunt =

Painting by Francisco de Goya

- La caza del jabalí (Spanish)
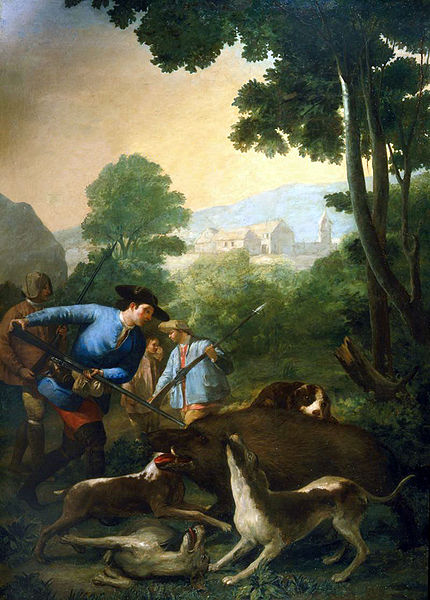
- Artist: Francisco Goya
- Year: 1775
- Medium: oil on canvas
- Dimensions: 249 cm × 173 cm (98 in × 68 in)
- Location: Palacio Real de Madrid, Madrid

The Boar Hunt (Spanish: La caza del jabalí) is a painting of 1775 by Francisco Goya and the earliest surviving tapestry cartoon by the artist. It depicts men with dogs and boar spears killing a boar.

The painting belongs to Goya's first series of cartoons, intended for a series of tapestries on hunting themes for Charles, Prince of Asturias and Maria Luisa of Parma. The tapestry was to be hung at the royal palace of El Escorial. Its authorship is confirmed by its dimensions in receipts for the tapestries from the archives of the Royal Tapestry Factory.

Goya's work was supervised by his brother in law Francisco Bayeu and Francisco's brother Ramón. Francesco delivered this and four other cartoons to the weaver Cornelio Vandergroten on 24 May 1775.

== See also ==
- List of Francisco Goya's tapestry cartoons
- List of works by Francisco Goya
