= Marquess of San Damián =

Hereditary title in the Peerage of Spain, granted in 1606

Marquessate of San Damián
- Creation date: 7 December 1606
- Created by: Philip III
- Peerage: Peerage of Spain
- First holder: Alonso de Idiázquez y Butrón-Múgica, 1st Marquess of San Damián
- Present holder: Elena Carlota de Figueroa y Sartorius, 12th Marchioness of San Damián

Marquess of San Damián (Spanish: Marqués de San Damián) is a hereditary title in the Peerage of Spain, granted in 1606 by Philip III to Alonso de Idiázquez, viceroy of Navarre and knight of the Order of Santiago. It was bestowed along with the titles of Duke of Ciudad Real and Count of Aramayona.

== Marquesses of San Damián (1606) ==
- Alonso de Idiázquez y Butrón-Múgica, 1st Marquess of San Damián (1564-1618)
- Juan Alonso de Idiázquez y Robles, 2nd Marquess of San Damián (1597-1653), son of the 1st Marquess
- Francisco Alonso de Idiázquex y Álava, 3rd Marquess of San Damián (b. 1620), son of the 2nd Marquess
- Francisco de Idiázquez y Borja Aragón, 4th Marquess of San Damián (b. 1676), son of the 3rd Marquess
- Juana María de Idiázquez y Borja Aragón, 5th Marchioness of San Damián (d. 1712), sister of the 4th Marquess
- María Antonia Pimentel e Idiázquez, 6th Marchioness of San Damián (1686-1728), daughter of the 5th Marchioness
- Ana María de Orozco y Villela, 7th Marchioness of San Damián (b. 1711), great-granddaughter of the 3rd Marquess
- Joaquín Antonio Osorio y Orozco, 8th Marquess of San Damián (1734-1782), son of the 7th Marchioness
- Benito Osorio y Lasso de la Vega, 9th Marquess of San Damián (d. 1819), son of the 8th Marquess

== Marquesses of San Damián (1918) ==
- Carlos de Figueroa y Alonso-Martínez, 10th Marquess of San Damián (1895-1971), direct descendant of the 7th Marchioness
- Carlos de Figueroa y Castillejo, 11th Marquess of San Damián (1931-2012), son of the 10th Marquess
- Elena Carlota de Figueroa y Sartorius, 12th Marchioness of San Damián (b. ?), daughter of the 11th Marquess

== See also ==
- Marquess of Villabrágima
- Count of Yebes
- Count of Velayos
