= Spanish nobility =

Aristocracy of Spain

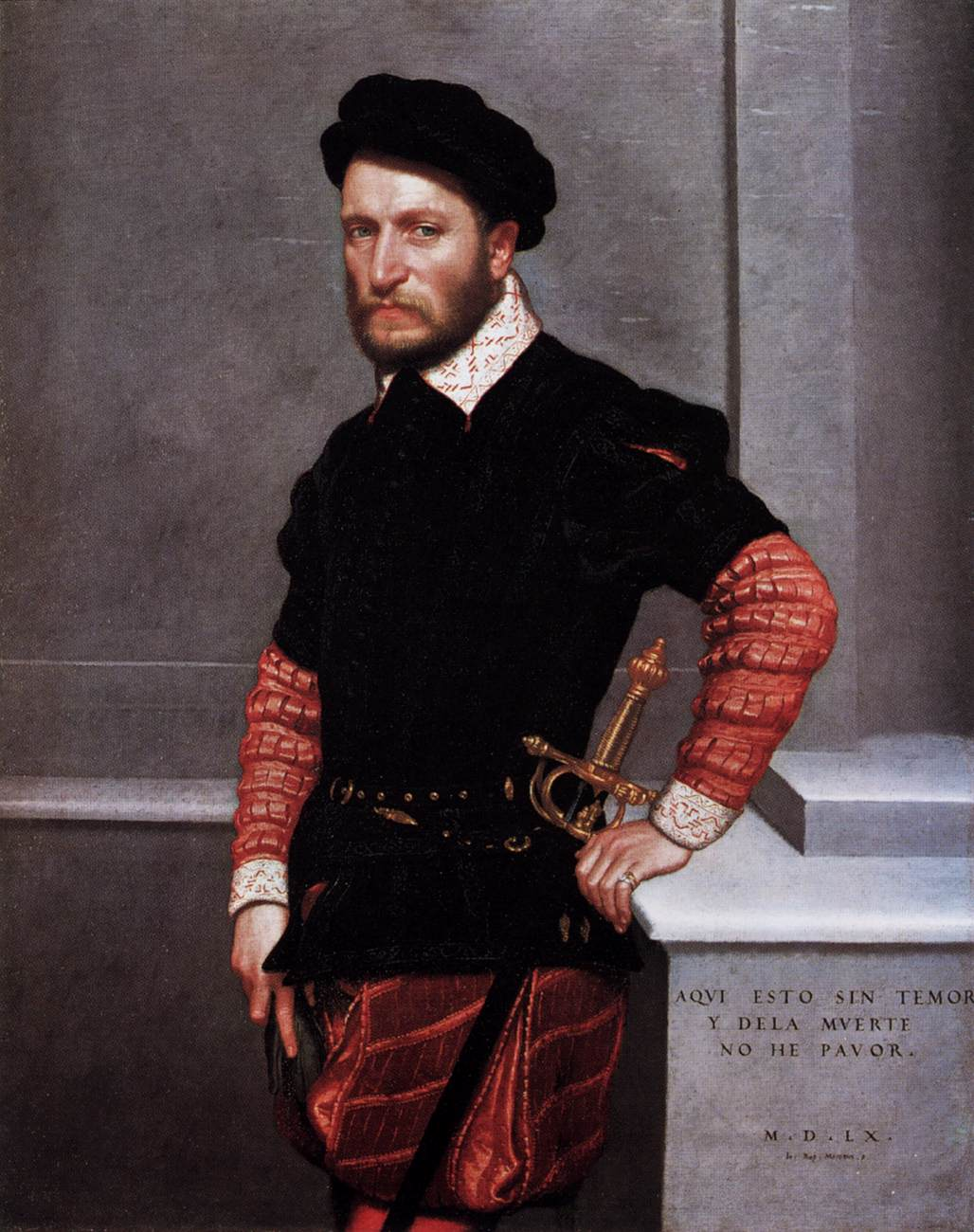
Portrait of a Spanish nobleman, the 5th Duke of Alburquerque, Grandee of Spain, at the height of the Spanish Empire, 1560

The Spanish nobility are people who possess a title of nobility confirmed by the Spanish Ministry of the Presidency, Justice and Relations with the Cortes, as well as those individuals appointed to one of Spain's three highest orders of knighthood: the Order of the Golden Fleece, the Order of Charles III and the Order of Isabella the Catholic. Some members of the Spanish nobility possess various titles that may be inherited or not, but the creation and recognition of titles is legally the prerogative of the monarchy of Spain.

Many Spanish titles and noble families still exist and many have transmitted their aristocratic status since the Middle Ages. Some aristocratic families in Spain use the nobiliary particle de before their family name, although this was more prominent before the 20th century.

== History ==
=== 16th century ===
The centralisation of the Spanish royal court in early modern Europe reshaped aristocratic power, shifting influence from regional noble domains to the Spanish monarchy's court. King Philip II's establishment of Madrid as Spain's political centre in 1561 compelled nobles to relocate to maintain royal favor. This transition reflected a shift across the Spanish aristocracy, where status and influence became increasingly tied to proximity to the sovereign, court patronage, and administrative roles, rather than independent territorial rule.

=== 17th century ===
Throughout the seventeenth century, the Spanish aristocracy became courtiers through necessity rather than conviction. In response to this situation, and without neglecting their noble estates and interests, they created their own spaces at court, and over time were able to colonise the royal capital in Madrid and convert it into their own natural habitat.

=== 20th century ===
Until 1923, noble titleholders in Spain were exempt from taxation; afterwards they were subject to it. During the rule of Francisco Franco in Spain (1939-1975), some new hereditary titles were conferred on individuals, and titles granted by Carlist pretenders were officially recognised. Despite Juan Carlos I's ascension to the Spanish throne in 1975, the royal court of nobles holding positions and offices attached to the Royal Household of Spain was not restored. He maintained the practice of conferring titles, however, to recognise those whose public service, artistic endeavours, personal achievements, philanthropy, etc. were deemed to have benefitted the Spanish nation.

== Spanish nobility today ==
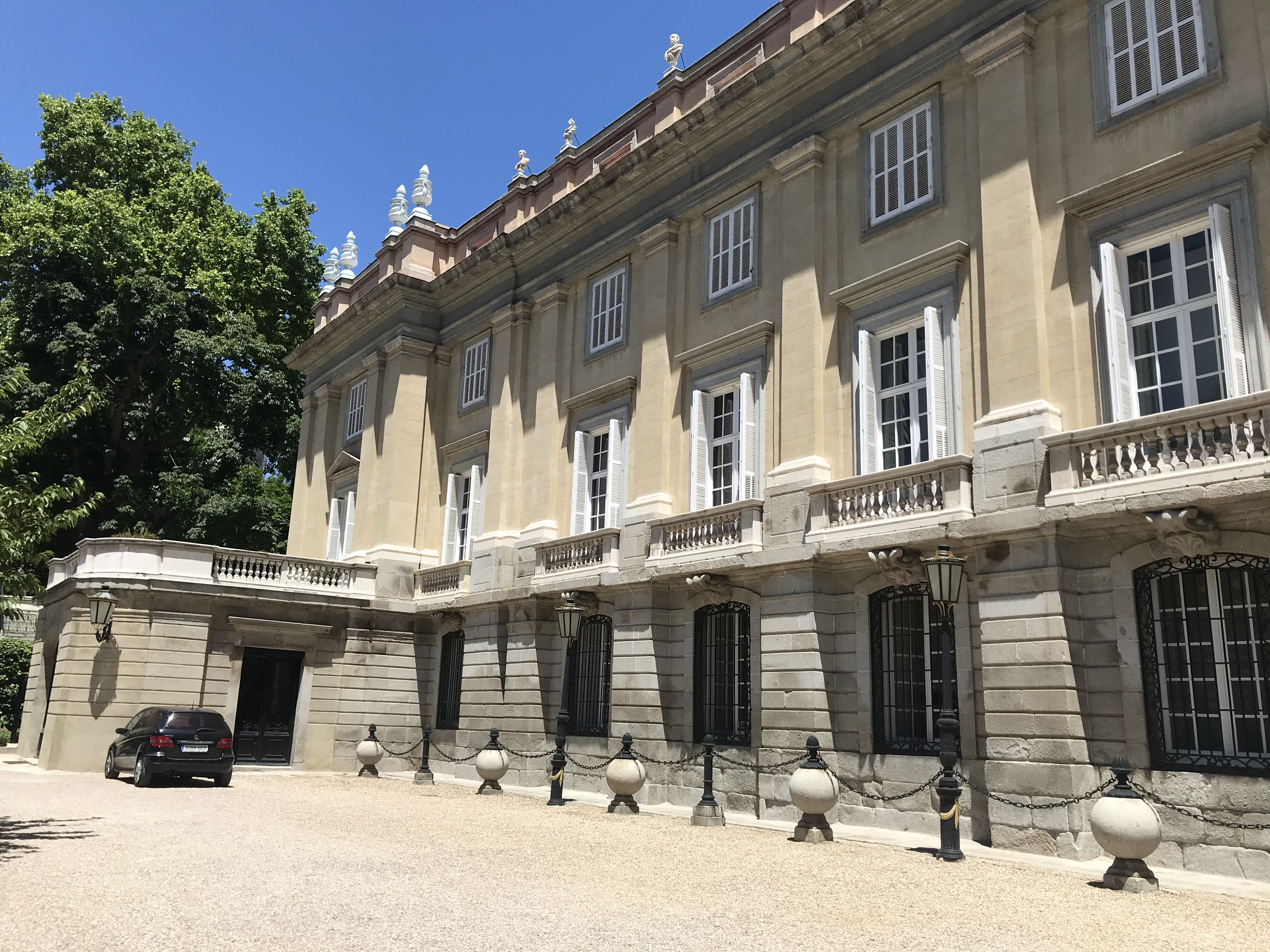
Palacio de Liria in Madrid, home of the Dukes of Alba

As of 2023, there are approximately 2,237 titled nobles in Spain, and there are 418 Grandes de España, with 2,825 total titles of Spanish nobility. Some nobles may carry more than one title of nobility. Many are active in the worlds of business, finance, and technology, with some taking on leadership roles in major IBEX 35 companies, some of Spain's largest companies. Examples include the president of FCC, Esther Alcocer Koplowitz, 9th Marchioness of Casa Peñalver, or Alfonso Martínez de Irujo Fitz-James Stuart, Duke of Híjar, president of IE Law School in Madrid.

=== Legal situation ===
In Spain today, the possession of a title of nobility does not imply any legal or fiscal privilege; the possession of titles of nobility is subject to the payment of a normal level of taxation. It is a distinction of merely honorary and symbolic character, accompanied by the treatment of the most excellent lord for those titles that possess the dignity of grandees of Spain and of illustrious lords for others. The last privilege, suppressed in 1984, was the right to a diplomatic passport by the Grandees of Spain (Grandes de España). This privilege disappeared by Royal Decree 1023/1984. The titles without the rank of grandee of Spain never enjoyed this privilege.

With the establishment of the Second Spanish Republic in 1931, the use of noble titles was abolished by way of Decree of 1 June 1931, ratified by Law of 30 December of the same year. In 1948, legal recognition of the usage of noble titles was provided for by Law of 4 May 1948 restoring the rules as they were before 14 April 1931.

At present, titles of nobility find their legal basis in article 62, section f, of the 1978 constitution, which grants the prerogative of the king to grant honours and distinctions in accordance with the laws.

Spanish legislation recognises titles of nobility and protects their legal owners against third parties. The Spanish nobility titles are in no case susceptible of purchase or sale, since their succession is strictly reserved for blood relatives of better right of the first holder of the title. The successions are processed by the Ministry of Justice and their use is subject to their respective tax.

The legal status of individual titles can be checked at the Permanent Deputation and Council of Grandees of Spain and Titles of the Kingdom website and using Guía de Títulos in the navigation bar.

== Classification of Spanish nobles ==
The crown of the Spanish monarch

The crown of the Prince or Princess of Asturias (heir apparent)

The coronet of an infante (prince)

A coronet of a grandee

A coronet of a Spanish duke

A coronet of a Spanish marquess

A coronet of a Spanish count

A coronet of a Spanish viscount

A coronet of a Spanish baron

A coronet of a Spanish señor (lord)

A coronet of a Spanish Hidalgo

Spanish nobles are classified as either grandees, as titled nobles, or as untitled nobles.

In the past, grandees were divided into first, second, and third classes, but this division has ceased to be relevant in practice while remaining a titular distinction; legally all grandees enjoy the same privileges in modern times. At one time however, each class held special privileges such as:

1. those who spoke to the king and received his reply with their heads covered.
2. those who addressed the king uncovered, but put on their hats to hear his answer.
3. those who awaited the permission of the king before covering themselves.

Additionally, all grandees were addressed by the king as mi Primo (my Cousin), whereas ordinary nobles were only qualified as mi Pariente (my Kinsman).

An individual may hold a grandeeship, whether in possession of a title of nobility or not. Normally, however, each grandeeship is attached to a title. A grandeeship is always attached to the grant of a ducal title. The grant of a grandeeship with any other rank of nobility has always been at the will of the sovereign. Excepting dukes and some very ancient titles of marquesses and counts, most Spanish titles of nobility are not attached to grandeeships.

A grandee of any rank outranks a non-grandee, even if that non-grandee's title is of a higher degree, with the exception of official members of the Spanish royal family who may in fact hold no title at all. Thus, a baron-grandee enjoys higher precedence than a marquess who is not a grandee.

Since 1987, the children of Spanish infantes, traditionally considered part of the royal family, have been entitled to the rank and style of a grandee but do not hold the legal dignity of grandee unless a grandeza is officially conferred by the sovereign; once the dignity has been officially bestowed, it becomes hereditary.

Some notable titles, which are attached to grandeeships, are: Duke of Alba, Duke of Medinaceli, Duke of Osuna, Duke of Infantado, Duke of Albuquerque, Duke of Nájera, Duke of Frías and Duke of Medina Sidonia, Marquess of Aguilar de Campoo, Marquess of Astorga, Marquess of Santillana, Marquess of Los Vélez, Count of Benavente, Count of Guaqui, Count of Lerín, Count of Olivares, Count of Oñate, and Count of Lemos.

== Form of address ==
Dukes, Grandees, their spouses and heirs are entitled to the honorific style of The Most Excellent Lord/Lady. Non-Grandee titled nobles, their spouses and offspring use the style of The Most Illustrious Lord/Lady. The style of Honourable Lord/Lady Don is used for all distinguished nobles with lower-level decorations of public administrations of the Kingdom granting lifelong nobility.

== Ranks ==
The ordinary Spanish nobility is divided into six ranks. From highest to lowest, these are: duque (duke), marqués (marquess), conde (count), vizconde (viscount), barón (baron), and señor (lord) (as well as the feminine forms of these titles).

Nobility descends from the first man of a family who was raised to the nobility (or recognised as belonging to the hereditary nobility) to all his legitimate descendants, male and female, in the male line (with some very few and notable exceptions). Thus, most persons who are legally noble hold no noble title. Hereditary titles formerly descended by male-preference primogeniture, a woman being eligible to inherit only if she had no brother or if her brothers also inherited titles. However, by Spanish law, all hereditary titles descend by absolute primogeniture, gender no longer being a criterion for preference in inheritance, since 2005.

On 21 October 2022, the Spanish authorities abolished 33 aristocratic titles. In early October, the Senate (upper house of parliament) of Spain approved a bill on historical memory, declaring the dictatorship of Francisco Franco and the judicial decisions made under his regime illegal.

=== Princes ===
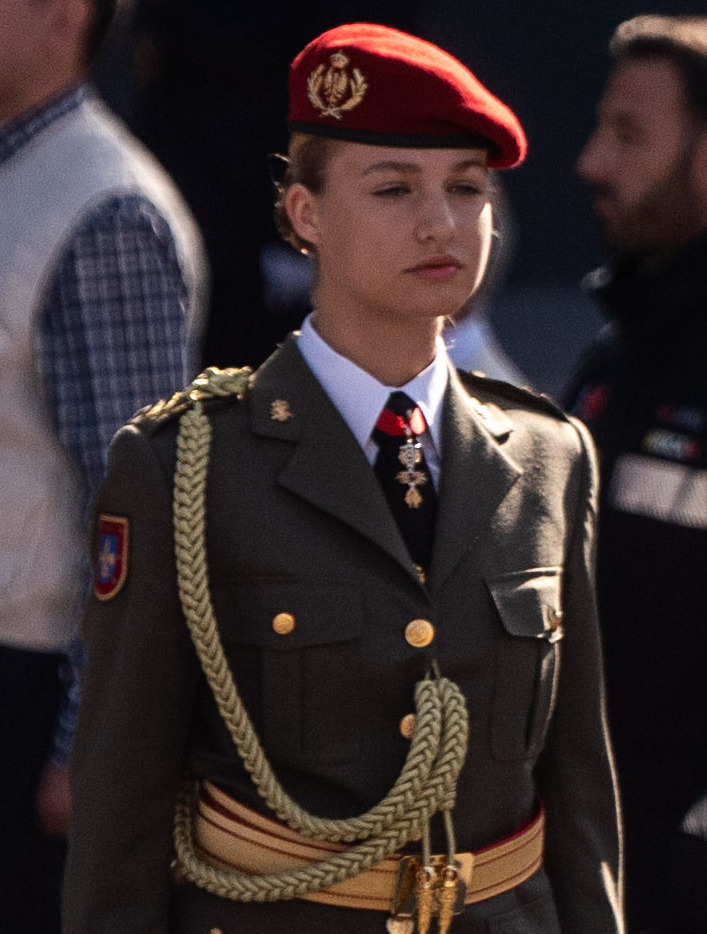
Leonor, Princess of Asturias, heir presumptive to the Spanish throne

The often overlooked title of 'prince' (príncipe, princesa) has historically been borne by those who have been granted or have inherited that title. It is often not included in lists of the Spanish nobility because it is rare. Prince/Princess are English translations of Infante/Infanta, referring to the son or daughter of a king; such titles are reserved for members of the royal family (the heir to the throne or the consort of the Queen regnant). Historically, infante or infanta could refer to offspring, siblings, uncles and aunts of a king. The heir's princely titles derive from the ancient kingdoms which united to form Spain.

Three titles of Prince are held by the heir to the Spanish throne.

- Prince of Asturias as heir apparent to the throne of the Kingdom of Castile and León.
- Prince of Girona as heir apparent to the throne of the Kingdom of Aragon.
- Prince of Viana as heir apparent to the throne of the Kingdom of Navarre.

Other titles of 'prince' were frequently granted by the kings of Spain, but usually in their capacity as kings of Naples or of Sicily. Such nobles often sojourned at the Spanish court where their titles were acknowledged, but rarely were Spanish nobles the recipients of a title of prince in Spain. The most notable exceptions were the title Prince of the Peace conferred in 1795 on Manuel Godoy, a favourite of the Spanish king and the title Prince of Vergara conferred to Baldomero Espartero. And Joseph Bonaparte conferred the title to be hereditary on his grandchildren in both the male and female line, Although legislation of the 20th century ended official recognition of the title of prince outside the royal bloodline family, it did allow the holder of a princedom to have the dignity converted to a ducal title of the same name.

When military dictator Francisco Franco appointed Juan Carlos de Borbón as his heir apparent with the future title of king, he created the new titles of prince of Spain for him.

=== Duke/Duchess (Duque/Duquesa) ===
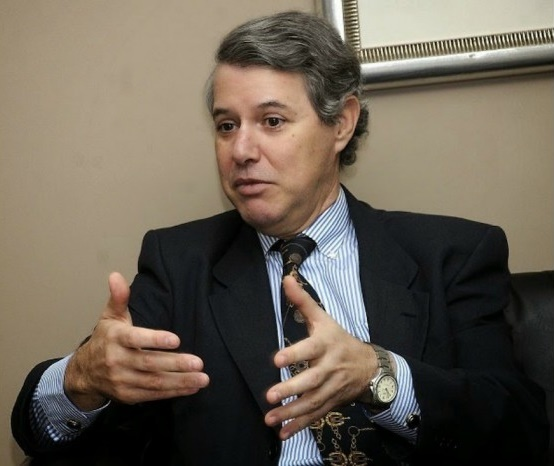
Cristóbal Colón de Carvajal, 18th Duke of Veragua

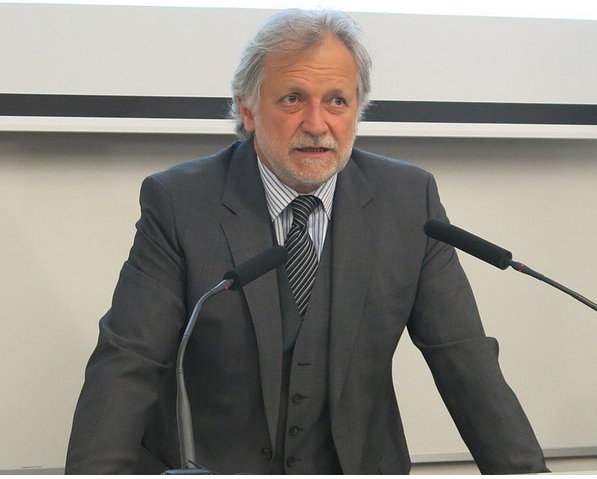
Leoncio Alonso González de Gregorio, 22nd Duke of Medina Sidonia

All dukedoms (except Fernandina) are attached to a grandeeship. A partial list includes:

- Duke of Abrantes
- Duke of Acerenza (no apparent record at La Diputación de la Grandeza de España y Títulos del Reino)
- Duke of Ahumada
- Duke of Alba
- Duke of Alburquerque
- Duke of Alcalá de los Gazules
- Duke of Alcudia
- Duke of Algeciras
- Duke of Algete
- Duke of Aliaga
- Duke of Almazán
- Duke of Almazán de Saint Priest
- Duke of Almodóvar del Río
- Duke of Amalfi
- Duke of Andría
- Duke of Arco
- Duke of Arcos
- Duke of Arión
- Duke of Arjona
- Duke of Aveiro
- Duke of Bailén
- Duke of Béjar
- Duke of Benavente
- Duke of Bivona
- Duke of Cádiz
- Duke of Calvo Sotelo, bestowed on the descendants of José Calvo Sotelo in 1948 (Defunct as of October 2022)
- Duke of Camiña
- Duke of Cardona
- Duke of Carrero Blanco, bestowed on Luis Carrero Blanco in 1973 (Defunct as of October 2022)
- Duke of Ciudad Real
- Duke of Ciudad Rodrigo, bestowed on the 1st Duke of Wellington for his services to the Spanish King
- Duke of Feria
- Duke of Franco, bestowed upon the descendants of General Francisco Franco (Defunct as of October 2022)
- Duke of Gandia
- Duke of Granada de Ega
- Duke of Infantado
- Duke of Lugo
- Duke of Mandas
- Duke of Medina Sidonia
- Duke of Medinaceli
- Duke of Moctezuma de Tultengo, held by the descendants of the Aztec Emperor Moctezuma II
- Duke of Mola, held by the descendants of Emilio Mola, a leader of the 1936 military putsch (Defunct as of October 2022)
- Duke of Nájera
- Duke of Osuna
- Duke of Palma de Mallorca
- Duke of Primo de Rivera (bestowed upon the relatives of José Antonio Primo de Rivera (Defunct as of October 2022)
- Duke of Seville
- Duke of Suárez
- Duke of Sueca
- Duke of Tamames
- Duke of Tetuán
- Duke of Veragua, held by the descendants of Christopher Columbus
- Duke of la Victoria

=== Marquess/Marchioness (Marqués/Marquesa) ===
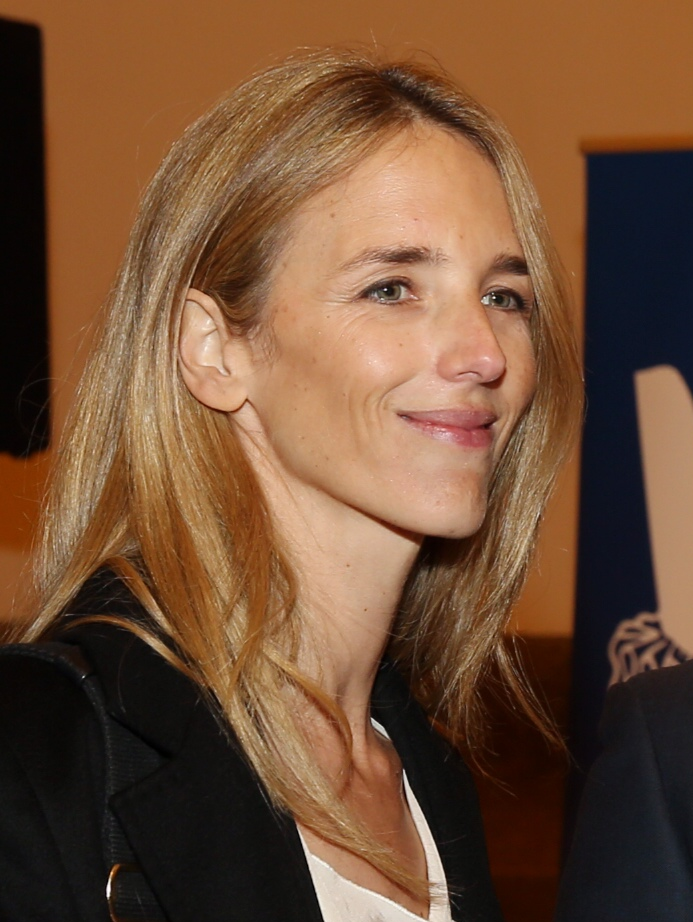
Cayetana Álvarez de Toledo, 14th Marchioness of Casa Fuerte

- Marquis of Alborán, bestowed on Francisco Moreno Fernández and his descendants in 1950 (Defunct as of October 2022)
- Marquess of Alfonsín, bestowed on Jaime Alfonsín in 2025
- Marquess of Almenara
- Marquess of Altamira
- Marquess of Alventos
- Marquess of Ardales
- Marquess of Arias Navarro, bestowed on Carlos Arias Navarro and his descendants in 1976 (Defunct as of October 2022)
- Marquess of Astorga
- Marquess of Bilbao Eguía, bestowed on Esteban de Bilbao Eguía and his descendants in 1961 (Defunct as of October 2022)
- Marquess of Bolarque
- Marquess of Borghetto
- Marquess of Camarasa
- Marquess of Campotéjar
- Marquess of Casa Cervera, bestowed on Juan Cervera Valderrama in 1961 (Defunct as of October 2022)
- Marquess of Castillo de Lerés
- Marquess of Castel-Moncayo
- Marquess of Cañada Honda
- Marquess of Cañete
- Marquess of Casa Fuerte
- Marquess of Covarrubias de Leyva (Grandeeship removed in October 2022)
- Marquess of Dávila, bestowed on Fidel Dávila Arrondo and his descendants in 1949 (Defunct as of October 2022)
- Marquess of Del Bosque
- Marquess of Fontellas
- Marquess of Fuster
- Marquess of Griñón
- Marquess of Iria Flavia
- Marquess of Jamaica, held by the descendants of Christopher Columbus
- Marquess of the Jardines de Aranjuez
- Marquess of Kindelán, bestowed on Alfredo Kindelán in 1961 (Defunct as of October 2022)
- Marquess of Larios
- Marquess of Laserna
- Marquess of Laula
- Marquess of Leganés
- Marquess of Llevant de Mallorca, bestowed on Rafael Nadal in 2025
- Marquess of Luz y Paz
- Marquess of Maratea
- Marquess of Moratalla
- Marquess of Navamorcuende
- Marquess of Novaliches
- Marquess of Merry del Val
- Marquess of O'Shea
- Marquess of Oquendo
- Marquess of Perales
- Marquess of Portago
- Marquess of Queipo de Llano, bestowed on Gonzalo Queipo de Llano and his descendants in 1950 (Defunct as of October 2022)
- Marquess of Samaranch
- Marquess of Saliquet, bestowed on Andrés Saliquet and his descendants (Defunct as of October 2022)
- Marquess of San Damián
- Marquess of San Felices de Aragón
- Marquis of San Fernando de Varela, bestowed on José Enrique Varela and his descendants in 1951 (Defunct as of October 2022)
- Marquis of San Leonardo de Yagüe, bestowed on Juan Yagüe and his descendants in 1953 (Defunct as of October 2022)
- Marquess of Santa Cruz
- Marquess of San Saturnino
- Marquess of Silvela
- Marquess of Somosierra, bestowed on Francisco García-Escámez and his descendants in 1952 (Defunct as of October 2022)
- Marquess of Suanzes, bestowed on Juan Antonio Suanzes in 1960 (Defunct as of October 2022)
- Marquess of Tabuérniga
- Marquess of Terranova
- Marquess of Torre Soto de Briviesca
- Marquess of Urquijo
- Marquess of Valdecarzana
- Marquess of Valdueza
- Marquess of Vallado
- Marquess of Valle de Alcudia
- Marquess of Vargas Llosa
- Marquess of Vessolla
- Marquess of Vigón, bestowed on Juan Vigón and his descendants in 1955 (Defunct as of October 2022)
- Marquess of Villabrágima
- Marquess of Villaviciosa de Asturias
- Marquess of Villena
- Marquess of Villa Marcilla

=== Count/Countess (Conde/Condesa) ===
- Count of Alcázar de Toledo, bestowed on José Moscardó Ituarte and his descendants in 1948 (Defunct as of October 2022)
- Count of Altamira
- Count of Barcelona; belongs to the Crown
- Count of Baños
- Count of Batanes
- Count of Bau, bestowed on Joaquín Bau Nolla in 1973 (Defunct as of October 2022)
- Count of Benjumea, bestowed on Joaquín Benjumea and his descendants (Defunct as of October 2022)
- Count of Bornos
- Count of Castillo de la Mota, bestowed on Pilar Primo de Rivera and her descendants in 1960 (Defunct as of October 2022)
- Count of Cervera
- Count of Covadonga
- Count of Elda: belonged to the House of Coloma.
- Count of Empúries
- Count of Fenosa, bestowed on Pedro Barrié de la Maza and his descendants in 1955 (Defunct as of October 2022)
- Count of Fontanar
- Count of Fontao
- Count of Iturmendi, bestowed on Antonio Iturmendi Bañales and his relatives in 1977 (Defunct as of October 2022)
- Count of Jarama, bestowed on Joaquín García Morato and his descendants in 1950 (Defunct as of October 2022)
- Count of La Cierva, bestowed on Juan de la Cierva and his descendants in 1954 (Defunct as of October 2022)
- Count of Labajos, bestowed on Onésimo Redondo and his descendants (Defunct as of October 2022)
- Count of Lemos
- Count of Lerín
- Count of Lucena
- Count of Maceda
- Count of Manila
- Count of Mansilla
- Count of Martín Moreno, bestowed on Francisco Martín-Moreno and his descendants in 1961 (Defunct as of October 2022)
- Count of la Maza
- Count of la Mejorada
- Count of Montijo
- Count of Olocau
- Count of Pallasar, bestowed on Joaquín García Pallasar and his descendants in 1961 (Defunct as of October 2022)
- Count of Rodezno (Grandeeship removed in October 2022)
- Count of Rodríguez de Valcárcel, bestowed on Alejandro Rodríguez de Valcárcel and his descendants (Defunct as of October 2022)
- Count of Roussillon
- Count of Salvatierra
- Count of San Esteban de Cañongo
- Count of Teba
- Count of Torrubia
- Count of Toreno
- Count of Torre Arias
- Count of Urgell
- Count of Vallellano (Grandeeship removed in October 2022)
- Count of Velayos
- Count of Villacieros
- Count of Villada
- Count of Yebes
- Count of Osorno

=== Viscount/Viscountess (Vizconde/Vizcondesa) ===
- Viscount of la Alborada
- Viscount of Altamira
- Viscount of Azpa
- Viscount of Banderas
- Viscount of Cabrera
- Viscount of la Calzada
- Viscount of Castillo de Almansa
- Viscount of Jala-Jala
- Viscount of Mindanao
- Viscount of Quintanilla de Florez
- Viscount of Rocabertí

=== Baron/Baroness (Barón/Baronesa) ===
Baronies did not exist in the Kingdom of Castile nor the Kingdom of Navarre, and the subsequent kings of Spain did not confer any baronies attached to Castilian or Navarrese estates. However, they did exist in the Kingdom of Aragon, such as:

- Baron of Polop

=== Lord/Lady (Señor/Señora; Don/Doña) ===
The title of Señor is, together with that of Conde and Barón, the oldest in seniority of the Spanish realms. Many of these lordships are among the oldest titles of nobility in Spain, and the señor usually exercised military and administrative powers over the lordship. Although some lordships were created by the kings of Spain, others existed before them and have not been created by any known king. For example, the lord of Biscay held a great degree of independence from the king of Castile, to whom he could pledge or not pledge feudal allegiance, but of whom he was not automatically a vassal: each new lord of Biscay had to renew his oath to the king. Ultimately, however, the kings of Castile inherited the lordship. In 1912, King Alfonso XIII prohibited the creation of new lordships, allowing those already in force to exist. In 1975, King Juan Carlos I circumvented this exception by approving a royal decree-law that created the Lordship of Meirás. This title was definitively abolished in 2022.

Besides those held by the Monarch, in Spain remain five lordships that maintain the official consideration of Titles of the Kingdom according to the Official Guide of the Titles and Grandees of the Kingdom published by the Ministry of Justice: the Lordship of Alconchel, the Lordship of Casa Lazcano (with Grandee of Spain), the Lordship of Casa Rubianes (with Grandee of Spain), the Lordship of Higuera de Vargas (with Grandee of Spain) and the Lordship of Sonseca. Other lordships that were considered as Titles of the Kingdom in the past, have not been rehabilitated.

Current known lordships:

- Lord of Alconchel
- Lord of Balaguer, held by the Princess of Asturias
- Lord of Biscay, held by the Monarch
- Lord of Higuera de Vargas
- Lord of Casa Lazcano
- Lord of Meirás, bestowed on Carmen Polo in 1975 (Defunct as of October 2022)
- Lord of Molina, held by the Monarch
- Lord of Casa Rubianes
- Lord of Sonseca

Also, since the Middle Ages, it exists the collective lordships (señorío divisorio), and all its members are considered lords. Some of these are the Lordship of Solar de Tejada (Infanta Elena's husband, Jaime de Marichalar, and their children, are part of this lordship), the Lordship of Solar de Mandayona y Villaseca or the Lordship of Valdeosera, among others.

=== Other titles ===
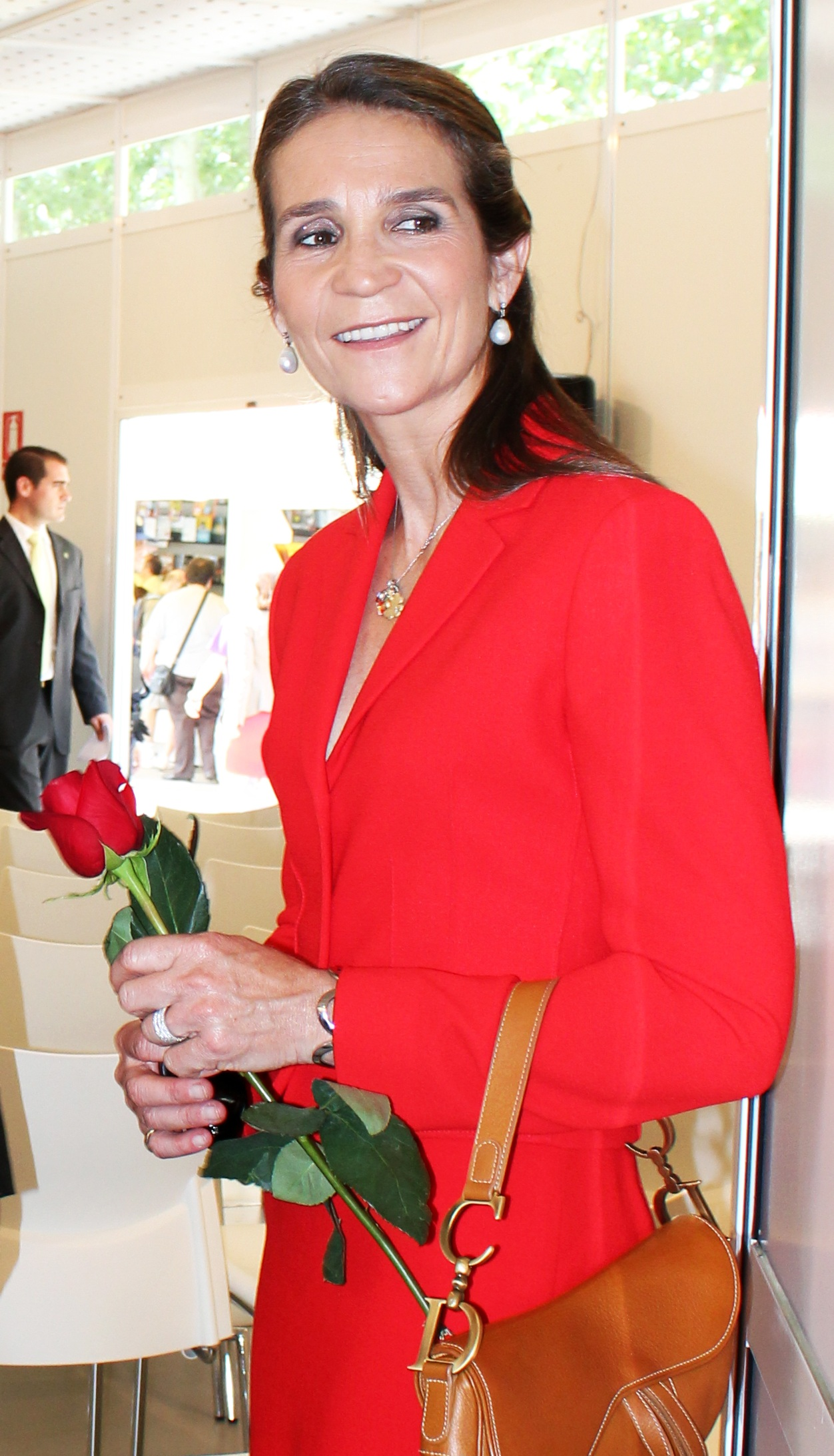
Infanta Elena, Duchess of Lugo, daughter of King Juan Carlos I

- Infante: currently borne by royal princes, other than the heir apparent to the throne, who are sons of a Spanish king.
- Knight of the Order of Charles III (caballero de la Orden de Carlos III): the bestowal of the highest order of knighthood on an individual grants personal nobility and certain heraldic privileges such as a heraldic mantle. The King of Spain continues to bestow this honor.
- Knight of the Royal Order of Isabella the Catholic (caballero de la Orden de Isabel la Católica): the bestowal of the second highest order of knighthood on an individual grants personal nobility and certain heraldic privileges such as a golden heraldic mantle. The King of Spain continues to bestow this honor.
- ricohombre (fem. Ricahembra): used during the Reconquista. The transition from ricohombres to grandes occurred between 1390 and 1530 as the new "noble oligarchy" replaced the old one due to the change of power base caused by the conflict between infantes of Aragon and the supporters of John II of Castile with his favourite Álvaro de Luna. Alfonso de Cartagena in his Doctrinal de los caballeros (c. 1441–1444), while discussing the grandes, states that the previous term ricohombres is "old-fashioned". By the 17th century the term was used to describe any nobleman.
- Condestable: cognate with "constable", it was a hereditary title used in the kingdoms of Castile and León for the official second in authority to the king. It became hereditary in the Velasco family which, however, gradually lost the powers once attributed to the Condestable of Castile.
- Caballero: equivalent to knight, it was very rare in the kingdom of Castile, but common in the kingdom of Aragon, where there were four types of caballeros:
  - Golden-spur caballero: borne by those infanzones (descendants of one of the cadet branches of the kings of Aragon which did not inherit the throne) who had been knighted. They were the highest ranking knights.
  - Royal-privilege caballero: a personal, non-hereditary title granted by the king to doctors of the law. It was rarely used by its holders, since the doctoral status enjoyed more privileges.
  - Caballero Mesnadero: borne by the cadet sons of a ricohombre. It fell into desuetude during the 18th century, when the Bourbon kings purged the ranks of the nobility.
  - Caballero franco: borne by those of hijosdalgo or infanzone status, but who were commoner-born.
- Potestad: borne only in the kingdom of Aragon, the equivalent of the Italian podestà, an administrative title. It disappeared with the Nueva Planta decrees in 1713.

=== Lower nobility ===
Lower nobility held ranks, without individual titles, such as infanzón (in Aragon, e.g. Latas Family), hidalgo or escudero. These did not, however, correspond to the status of a barón, a title unknown to Spanish nobility except in Catalonia.

Hidalgo was the most common of these. Originally all the nobles in the Western Peninsular Christian Realms were hidalgos and, as cristianos viejos ("old Christians"), held nearly exclusive right to privileged status (although there were some Jews and Muslims recognised as hidalgos, who shared their privilege to bear arms as knights in the mesnada real). The first of the kings of Pamplona and Asturias were originally elected and lifted up on a shield to assume Princeps inter Pares status, by these otherwise untitled nobles. For approximately three hundred years the hidalgos retained this privilege, only a few of them eventually being granted the non-heritable title of comes. Unlike Spain's later titled nobles, the early hidalgo did not necessarily possess or receive any fief or land grant. Many were as poor as commoners, although they were tax-exempt and could join the civil service or the army.

During the Middle Ages hidalgo became a title granted by the kings of Castile as a reward for service done to the crown (or, as in Biscay, as a way of recognizing prior rights). In the same way escudero was granted for military achievement when the Reconquista ended. Being the most obvious proof of noble descent, hidalgo came to be the only lesser title to remain among the modern ranks of Spanish nobility. From this ancient estate of the realm emerged Spain's nobility. All titled and untitled nobles are considered hidalgos, but many of the modern titled nobility do not descend from the original hidalguía.

The term Hidalgo de Sangre indicated membership in a family whose noble status was recognized in the earliest records of its existence; thus its immemorial nobility was acknowledged but not created by any monarch.

== Succession ==
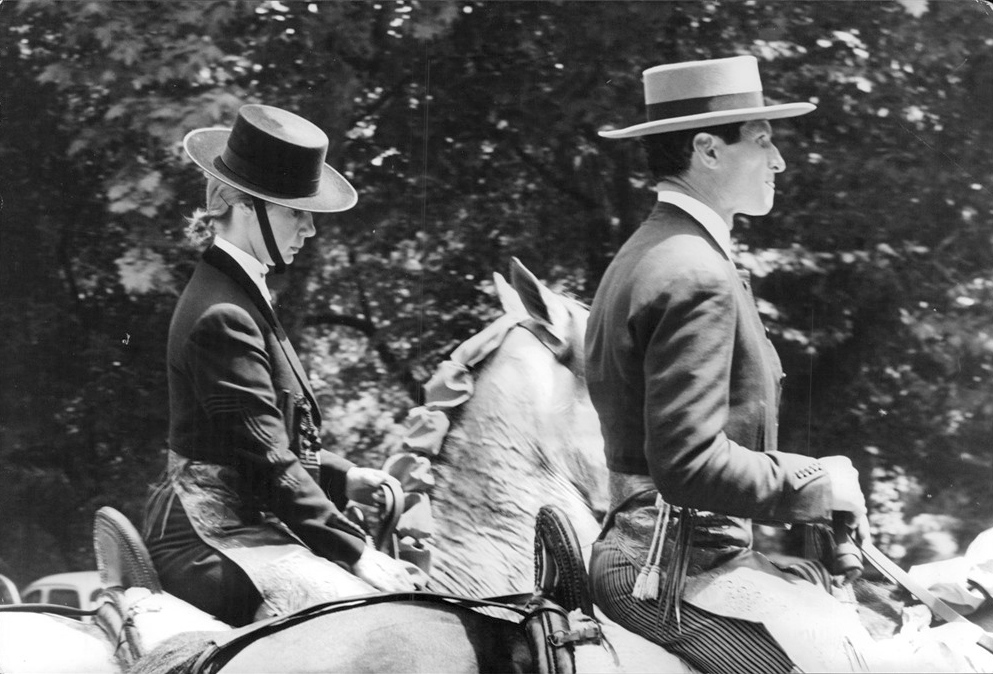
Cayetana Fitz-James Stuart, 18th Duchess of Alba (1926–2014), was the woman with the most titles of nobility in the world

The evidence supporting one's claim to a title may be reviewed by the Permanent Deputation and Council of Grandees of Spain and Titles of the Kingdom. The body includes eight grandees, eight nobles who are not grandees, and a president who must hold both a grandeeship and a hereditary title unattached to a grandeeship.

Succession to Spanish noble titles is hereditary, but not automatic. The original letters patent which created the title determine the order of succession. Payment of substantial fees is required whenever a title is inherited.

While noble titles historically have followed the rule of male-preference primogeniture, a Spanish law came into effect on 30 October 2006, after approval by both houses of the Cortes, establishing the inheritance of hereditary noble titles by the firstborn regardless of gender. The law is retroactive to 27 July 2005.

Following the death of a noble, the senior heir may petition the sovereign through the Spanish Ministry of Justice for permission to use the title. If the senior heir does not make a petition within two years, then other potential heirs may do so on their own behalf. There is a limit of forty years from the vacancy by death or relinquishment of a title within which that title may be claimed and revived by an heir.

The petitioner must demonstrate that he or she is a child, grandchild or direct male line descendant of a noble (whether a grandee or not), or that he or she belongs to certain bodies or orders of chivalry deemed noble, or that the father's family is recognized as noble. The amount of fees due depend on whether the title is attached to a grandeeship or not, and on whether the heir is a direct descendant or a collateral kinsman of the previous holder. The petition is normally granted, except if the petitioner is a criminal.

Titles may also be ceded to heirs other than the senior heir, during the lifetime of the main titleholder. Normally, this process is used to allow younger children to succeed to lesser titles, while the highest or principal title goes to the senior heir. Only subsidiary titles may be ceded; the principal title must be reserved for the senior heir. The cession of titles may only be done with the approval of the monarch.

The late Cayetana Fitz-James Stuart, 18th Duchess of Alba (1926–2014) holds the Guinness World Record for number of titles with over 50 titles. Before her death, she ceded some of her titles to each of her six children; otherwise, all of them would have been inherited by the oldest.

== Alternative nobility ==
The pretender Carlist branch of the Bourbons created its own titles for its supporters, unrecognized by the ruling Christinos branch. When General Francisco Franco became head of state with the support of, among others, Carlist troops, Carlist titles became officially recognized.

== Titles created during the reign of King Juan Carlos I ==
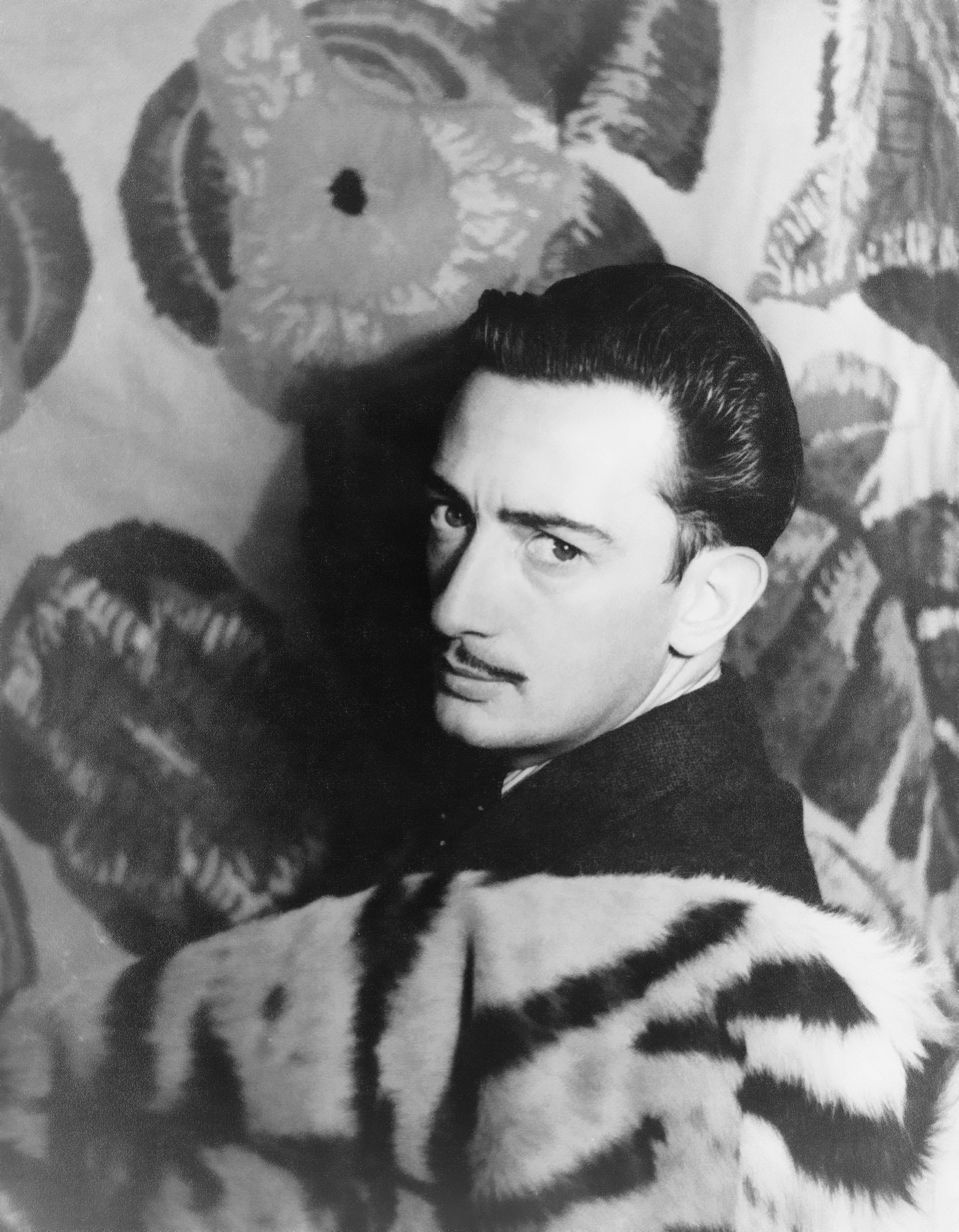
Salvador Dalí, 1st Marquess of Dalí de Púbol

From the beginning of his reign in November 1975, King Juan Carlos I created new titles for about 51 people (as of April 2011), among others recognising the merits of politicians and artists. Some of these dignities have been hereditary. Examples include:

- Carmen Franco y Polo, daughter of dictator Francisco Franco, created 1st Duchess of Franco and Grandee of Spain in 1975
- Carlos Arias Navarro, Prime Minister, created 1st Marquess of Arias Navarro and Grandee of Spain in 1976
- Torcuato Fernández-Miranda, Prime Minister, created 1st Duke of Fernandez-Miranda and Grandee of Spain in 1977
- Adolfo Suárez, Prime Minister, created 1st Duke of Suárez and Grandee of Spain in 1981
- Andrés Segovia, classical guitarist, created 1st Marquess of Salobreña in 1981
- Salvador Dalí, surrealist painter, created 1st Marquess de Dalí de Púbol in 1982
- Joaquín Rodrigo, composer and pianist, created 1st Marquess of the Jardines de Aranjuez in 1991
- Juan Antonio Samaranch, President of the International Olympic Committee, created 1st Marquess of Samaranch and Grandee of Spain in 1991
- Manuel Gutiérrez Mellado, officer and politician, created 1st Marquess of Gutiérrez-Mellado in 1994
- Camilo José Cela, author and Nobel laureate, created 1st Marquess of Iria Flavia in 1996
- Leopoldo Calvo-Sotelo, Prime Minister, created 1st Marquess de la Ría of Ribadeo and Grandee of Spain in 2002
- Margarita Salas, scientist, created 1st Marchioness of Canero in 2008
- Paloma O'Shea Artiñano, pianist, created 1st Marchioness of O'Shea in 2008
- José Ángel Sánchez Asiaín, an international banker, created 1st Marquess of Asiaín in 2010
- Antoni Tàpies, painter, created 1st Marquess of Tàpies in 2010
- Vicente del Bosque, football manager, created 1st Marquess of Del Bosque in 2011
- Mario Vargas Llosa, author and Nobel laureate, created 1st Marquess of Vargas Llosa in 2011.

King Juan Carlos also exceptionally confirmed the title of Count of Barcelona, a title historically attached to the Crown, but used as a title of pretence by his father, Infante Juan, during the dynasty's 20th century exile and the subsequent reign of his son.

== Titles created during the reign of King Felipe VI ==
On 19 June 2025, on the 11th anniversary of the proclamation of the sovereign, the Royal Household announced the creation by King Felipe VI of his first titles of nobility.

- Jaime Alfonsín, former secretary of the king, was created Marquess of Alfonsín and Grandee of Spain.
- Rafael Nadal, former tennis player, was created Marquess of Llevant de Mallorca.
- Teresa Perales, swimmer, was created Marchioness of Perales.
- Luz Casal, singer, was created Marchioness of Luz y Paz.
- Carlos López Otín, biochemist, was created Marquess of Castillo de Lerés for life (at his own request).
- Cristina García Rodero, photographer, was created Marchioness of Valle de Alcudia.

King Felipe has also reinstated the Dukedom of Fernandina, the Marquessate of Murillo, and the Countship of Torre Alegre; and has merged to the Crown the title of Duchess of Palma de Mallorca, formerly belonging to his elder sister, Infanta Cristina of Spain, over a corruption enquiry.

== See also ==
- Immemorial nobility
- List of European Jewish nobility

== Bibliography ==
- Iafolla, Robert John (2021). Conceptions of Power in Late Medieval Castile: From Possession to Exercise (PhD in History thesis). University of California, Los Angeles.
