= Mariano Téllez-Girón, 12th Duke of Osuna =

Spanish aristocrat and diplomat

The Most Excellent The Duke of Osuna GE OM LH OAN KA
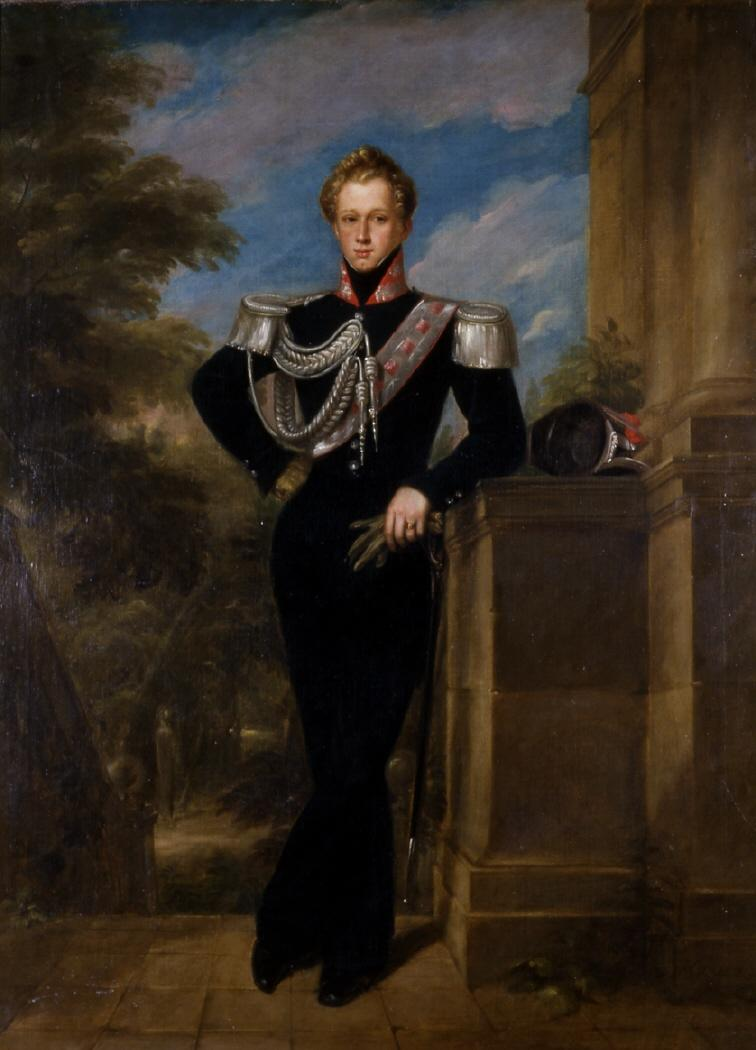
- Portrait by Valentín Carderera, c. 1833

Personal details
- Born: Mariano Francisco de Borja José Justo Téllez-Girón y Beaufort Spontin; 19 July 1814 Madrid, Spain
- Died: 2 June 1882 (aged 67) Beauraing, Belgium
- Parents: Francisco de Borja Téllez-Girón, 10th Duke of Osuna (father); María Francisca Beaufort Spontin y Álvarez de Toledo (mother)

Mariano Téllez-Girón y Beaufort Spontin, 12th Duke of Osuna, GE, OM, LH, OAN, KA (19 July 1814 – 2 June 1882), was a Spanish peer, diplomat and army officer, whose lavish exploits as Ambassador of Spain to the Russian Empire earned him admiration and popularity amongst European courts. He was a younger brother of Pedro de Alcántara Téllez-Girón, from whom he inherited his 59 peerage titles when he died prematurely in 1844.

Born to one of the most influential families in the Kingdom of Spain, he quickly followed the steps of his father into the military, and was made a cadet age 19. The Duke of Osuna, at the time styled Marquess of Terranova, saw action in many fronts of the First Carlist War, being profusely decorated in July 1836. From 1838, he was member of parliament for Cádiz and worked as a military attaché in different embassies.

In 1856, Osuna was sent to Saint Petersburg as ambassador by Queen Isabella II, who despite her low regard for him, was aware of his likeable character. The duke, "a formidable dandy", was ultimately sent to recover the prestige of a decadent Spain in the complex Tsarist court, influenced at the time by the English and French envoys. During his tenure as ambassador in Saint Petersburg, he achieved the resumption of strong diplomatic relations between the Kingdom of Spain and the Russian Empire, which had been broken at the death of Ferdinand VII. The sumptuous parties he gave at the Spanish embassy paid for out of his own pocket became world famous. As claimed by Valera and Béthencourt, in one occasion, the Duke of Osuna celebrated an opulent dinner in which he ordered that the guests threw the entirety of the tableware of gold through the windows of his palace and into the River Neva, so as to spare washing effort to his servants. In fact, his wealth was so extraordinary, that it was alleged that he could travel from Santander to Cádiz without leaving his possessions at all.

Osuna died in 1882, childless and in financial ruin. According to an author, "the refined duke consumed himself in his own brilliance". The seventeen million pesetas (plus assets) he had inherited after the death of his brother were brought down to liabilities of around forty million at his death. The expression "not that you were Osuna" was coined after him, and is still widely used in reference to someone who displays flamboyant expenses and wealth.

== Family origins ==
Mariano was the son of Francisco Téllez-Girón, 10th Duke de Osuna and of María Francisca Beaufort Spontin y Álvarez de Toledo, of the House of Beaufort-Spontin. The Téllez-Girón family had held title over the Dukedom of Osuna since 1562 with the rise of Pedro Téllez-Girón.

== Biography ==
Mariano inherited the Dukedom of Osuna after the premature death of his brother Pedro in 1844.

On 29 August 1844 he inherited the titles and estates of the House of Osuna from his brother, and began a life of luxury that ended with his great ruin. The expression "nor that you were Osuna" (ni que fueras Osuna) is still famous in reference to his vast expense and wealth, and is used to refer to someone who is a spendthrift. It was said that he could cross half of Spain without leaving his possessions. He was the last inhabitant of his family in Alameda de Osuna, a small palace on the outskirts of Barajas in Madrid. He had important agricultural properties in Seville, Guadalajara and Extremadura.

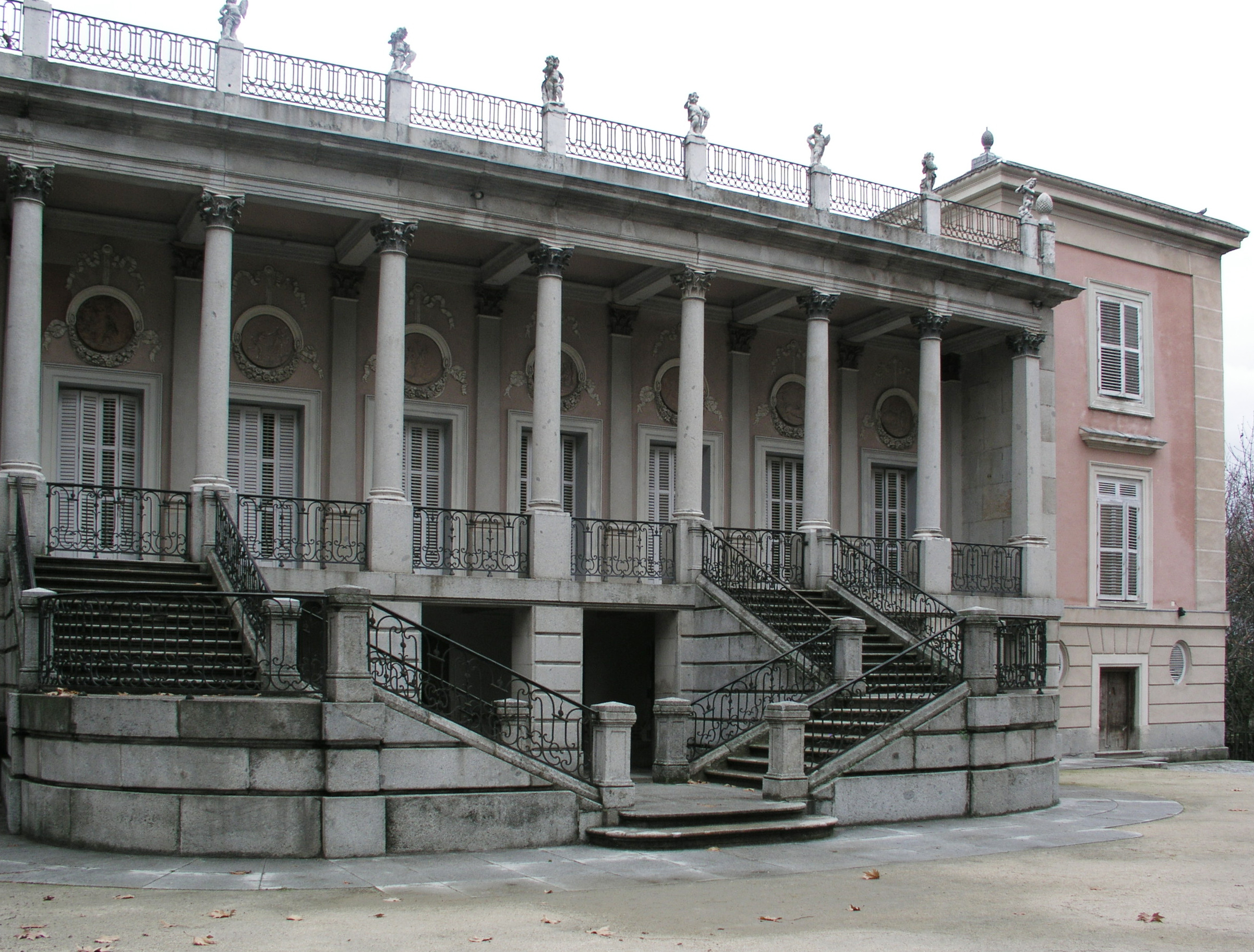
Osuna's Madrid home

Ambassador at the Coronation of Queen Victoria, Ambassador in Paris at the wedding of Napoleon III and Eugenia de Montijo in 1853 and was then the Ambassador Extraordinary to Saint Petersburg for 12 years, from 1856 to 1868. During his time in Russia, Juan Valera, his personal secretary, minutely described Osuna's flamboyant lifestyle.

In 1861, upon his return to Madrid, Osuna was granted the Order of the Golden Fleece by Queen Isabella.

In 1881, he was the Spanish representative at the wedding of the future Kaiser, Wilhelm II. He died in his castle of Beauraing in June 1882, with Prince Georg Friedrich Bernhard of Solms-Braunfels notifying of his death to the Senate.

=== Downfall ===
The untying measures taken at the same time as the Spanish confiscation made the ownership of the land completely his, which ruined him completely since the mortgages were charged against him. He was the last effective lord of all the family estates that were confiscated by the laws of Mendizábal, which they used that upon his death without succession, and since his main heir was the Duke of Alba (who had already accumulated 7 Grandeeships), a huge lawsuit was initiated. Such was the severity of the inheritance of Osuna, that king Alfonso XII had to intervene, as it was not seen with good eyes that a single person possessed so many titles and possessions. The inheritance was disrupted and distributed to different families. The title of the Duke of the Infantado then passed into the hands of the Arteaga family, who managed to recover part of the property of the House.

He died in 1882, childless and in bankruptcy, allegedly not being able to pay for his own tomb.

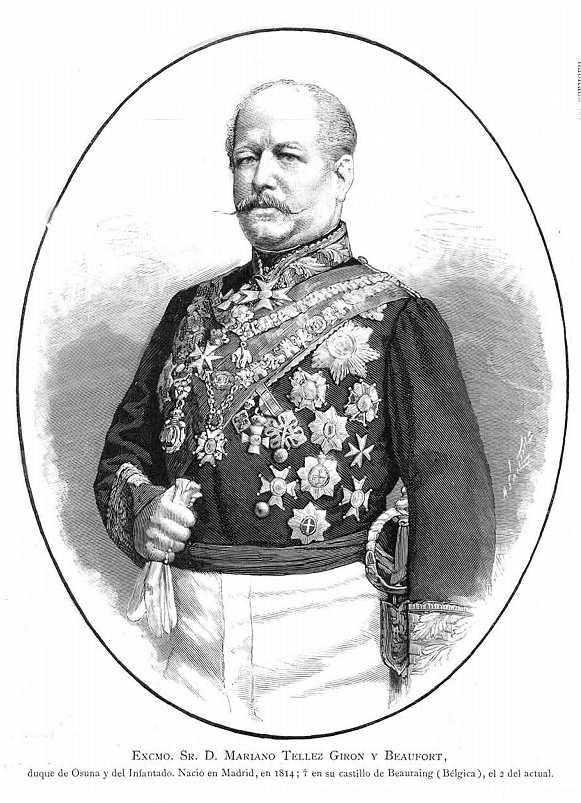
Portrayed shortly before his death in La Ilustración Española y Americana, 1882

== Titles held ==
=== Dukedoms ===
- 12th Duke of Osuna
- 11th Duke of Pastrana
- 15th Duke of Béjar
- 14th Duke of Arcos
- 15th Duke of Benavente
- 15th Duke of the Infantado
- 16th Duke of Plasencia
- 16th Duke of Gandía
- 14th Duke of Medina de Rioseco
- 11th Duke of Lerma
- 11th Duke of Estremera
- 12th Duke of Francavilla

=== Marquessates ===
14th Marquess of Peñafiel, 16th Marquess of Santillana, 17th Marquess of Tavara, 12th Marquess of Terranova, Marquess of Cea, Marquess of Gibraleón, Marquess of Lombay, Marquess of Zahara, Marquess of Cenete, Marquess of Angüeso, Marquess of Almenara, Marquess of Algecilla.

=== Countships ===
17th Count of Benavente, 8th Count of Fontanar, 16th Count of Ureña, Count of Mayorga, Count of Bañares, Count of Oliva, Count of Mayalde, Count of Belalcázar, Count of Real de Manzanares, Count of Saldaña, Count of the Cid, Count of Melgar de la Frontera, Count of Bailén, Count of Villada.

== See also ==
- Antonio Ponce de León
- Vicente Pío Osorio de Moscoso

== Bibliography ==
- Marichalar, Antonio de (1999). Riesgo y ventura del duque de Osuna. Ediciones Palabra, S.A. ISBN 978-84-82393-11-7.
- Claes, Marie-Christine (2014). Faste et misère : le château de Beauraing au temps d'un Grand d'Espagne. Namur. ISBN 978-2-87502-052-9.
- Sánchez-González, Antonio (2018). Mariano Osuna, entre la realidad y la leyenda. Universidad de Huelva. ISSN 1130-5029.
