= Beaufort-Spontin =

Belgian noble family

- Noble family
- Country: Holy Roman Empire Austrian Netherlands United Kingdom of the Netherlands; Kingdom of Belgium Austria-Hungary
- Titles: Duke of Beaufort-Spontin; Marquess of Almenara; Imperial Count; Princely Count; Count

The House of Beaufort-Spontin is a noble family which held prominent posts under the Holy Roman Emperors in the Austrian Netherlands, their family seat having originally been in Namur. The most notable member of the family was Frederic August Alexander of Beaufort-Spontin, who became the first Duke of Beaufort-Spontin in 1782. Cadets bear the title of Count or Countess. The members of this family now reside in Austria and were members of the Austrian nobility, but their origins are in territories in what is today Belgium.

== History ==
The family is descended from the Counts of Beaufort, who held land near Huy in the early 11th century. The original family split into several branches, including those of Spontin and of Vêves (the present Counts of Liedekerke-Beaufort descend from the latter). The branch of Beaufort-Spontin settled in Freÿr in the early 15th century.

In 1783, the 1st Duke of Beaufort-Spontin married María Leopoldina Álvarez de Toledo y Salm-Salm, 10th Marchioness of Almenara, in Paris. She was the daughter of the 12th Duke of Infantado and of Princess María Ana Victoria of Salm-Salm, a grand-daughter of the Prince of Löwenstein-Wertheim-Rochefort. This made Frederic August a brother-in-law of Pedro de Alcántara Álvarez de Toledo, who was Prime Minister of Spain. The second child of Beaufort and María Leopoldina would marry the 10th Duke de Osuna, and their children would eventually become the 11th and 12th Dukes of Osuna.

== Dukes of Beaufort-Spontin ==
- Frederic August Alexander of Beaufort-Spontin (1751–1817), Count of Beaufort, Marquis of Spontin and of Florennes, was the son of Charles Albert (1713-1753), made Marquis of Beaufort-Spontin with princely rank in 1746, and of his wife Countess Marie-Marguerite de Glymes (1732-1755), heiress of the Counts of Glymes. He was elevated to the rank of Duke in the Austrian Netherlands in 1782 and to Imperial count in 1789. He was the Chamberlain of Archduke Charles of Austria in Brussels, and the Governor-General of the Netherlands on behalf of the Sixth Coalition Powers in 1814. He was also President of the Privy Council, Chamberlain, and Grand Marshal of the Court of King William I of the Netherlands.
- Frederic Louis Ladislas, 2nd Duke of Beaufort-Spontin (1809–1834).
- Alfred Charles August, 3rd Duke of Beaufort-Spontin (1816–1888), son of the first duke's second marriage to Countess Ernestine of Starhemberg, became a hereditary member of Austria's House of Lords, receiving the title of Prince von Beaufort and the style of Serene Highness in 1876.
- Friedrich Georg Maria Anton Michael, 4th Duke of Beaufort-Spontin (1843–1916), was the son of Duke Alfred by his first wife, Pauline de Forbin-Janson. Although born in Brussels, he died on the family's entailed Bohemian estate of Petschau during World War I. By his marriage to Princess Marie Mélanie de Ligne he was the father of the fifth duke.
- Heinrich Maria Eugen, 5th Duke of Beaufort-Spontin (1880–1966), born in Paris, he too served in Austria's upper house until the abolition of the Austro-Hungarian empire in 1918, having in 1910 wed Countess Marie-Adelheid von Silva-Tarouca, by whom he was the father of the sixth duke. He died in Graz, Austria.
- Friedrich, 6th Duke of Beaufort-Spontin (1916–1998), was born in Bohemia and died in Graz, having been a farmer in Steiermark.
- Friedrich Christian, 7th Duke of Beaufort-Spontin (born 1944) is the son of the sixth duke by his 1943 marriage to Christiane Steinheuer. Born at Petschau, he is a physician specializing in nuclear medicine, formerly a professor at Graz University, and lives in Steiermark, Austria. As neither he nor his brother, Count Christian de Beaufort-Spontin (born 1947), has sons by their marriages, the ducal and princely titles have no heirs in the next generation.

== Gallery of castles ==
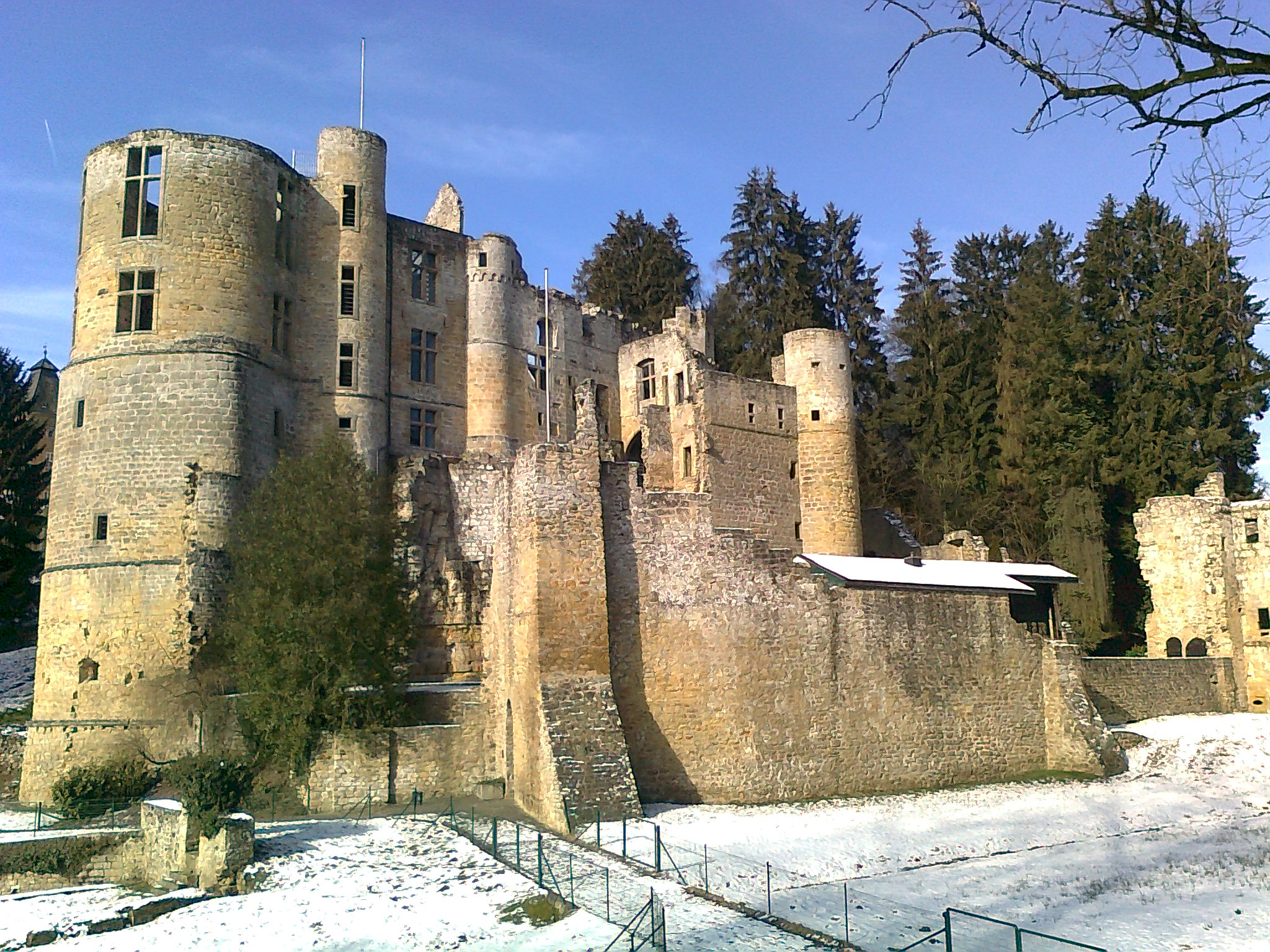
Ruins of Beaufort Castle, Luxembourg

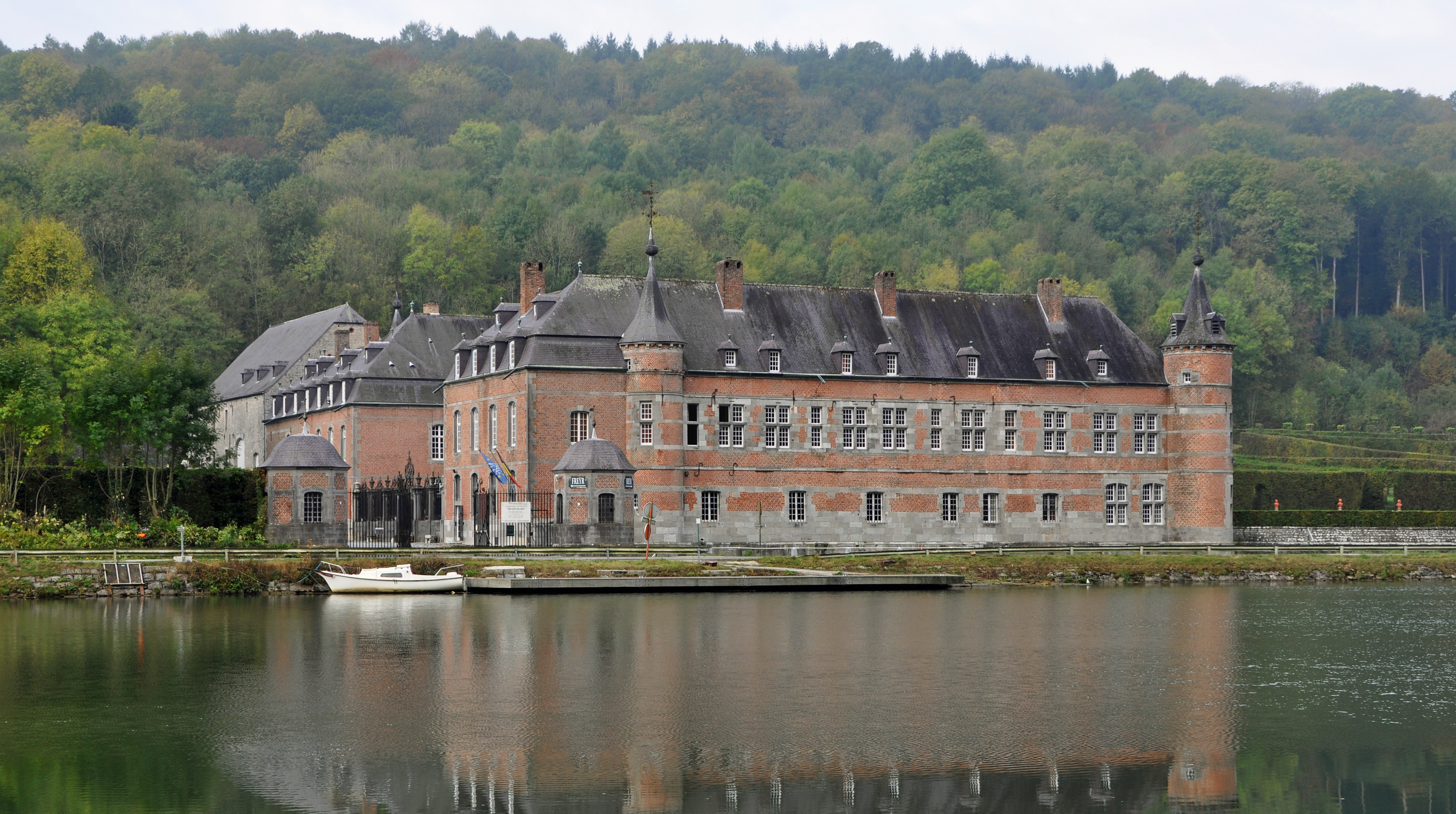
The castle of Freÿr seen from the Meuse

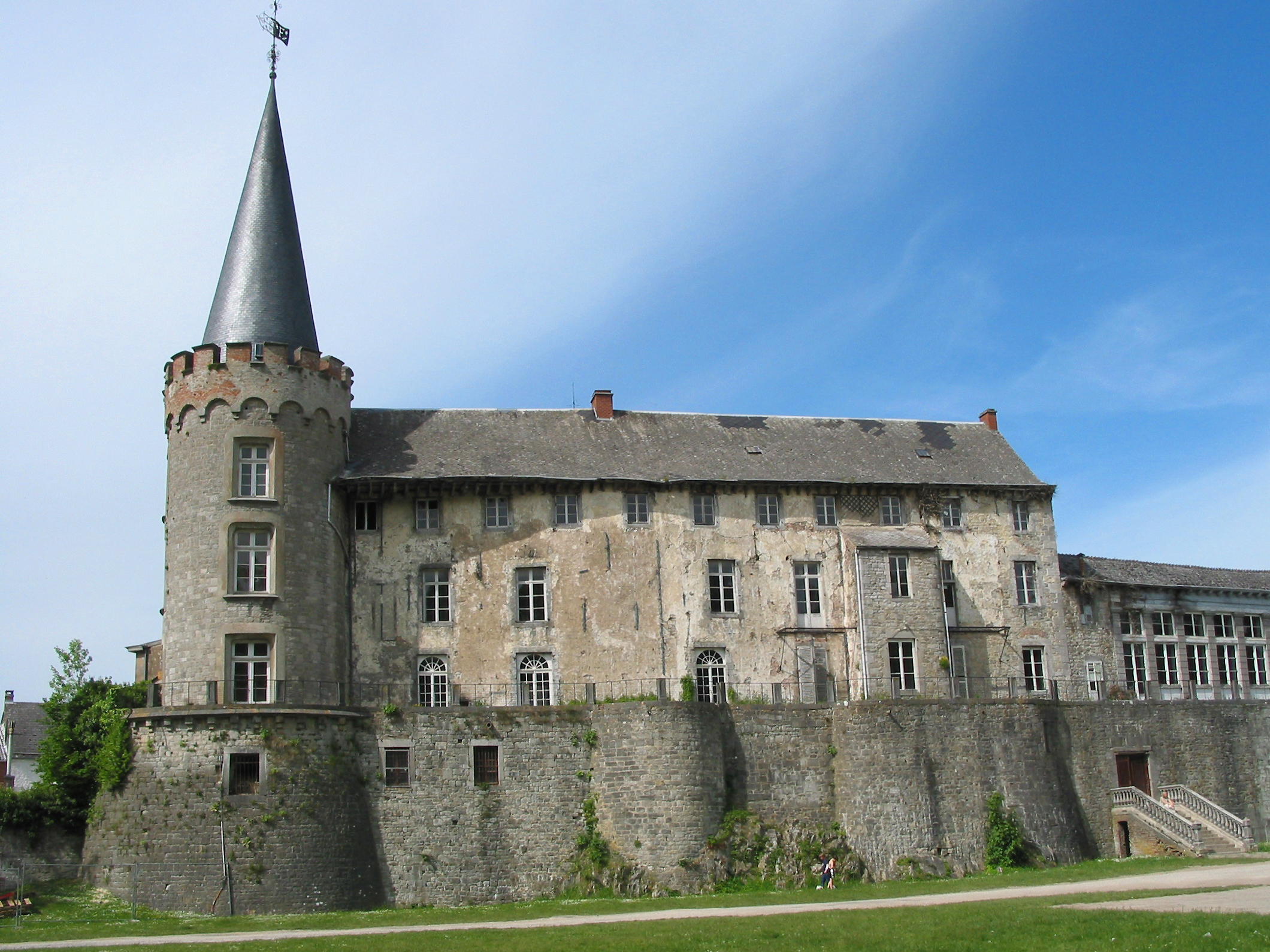
Florennes Castle (formerly the Château de Beaufort) in Florennes, Namur

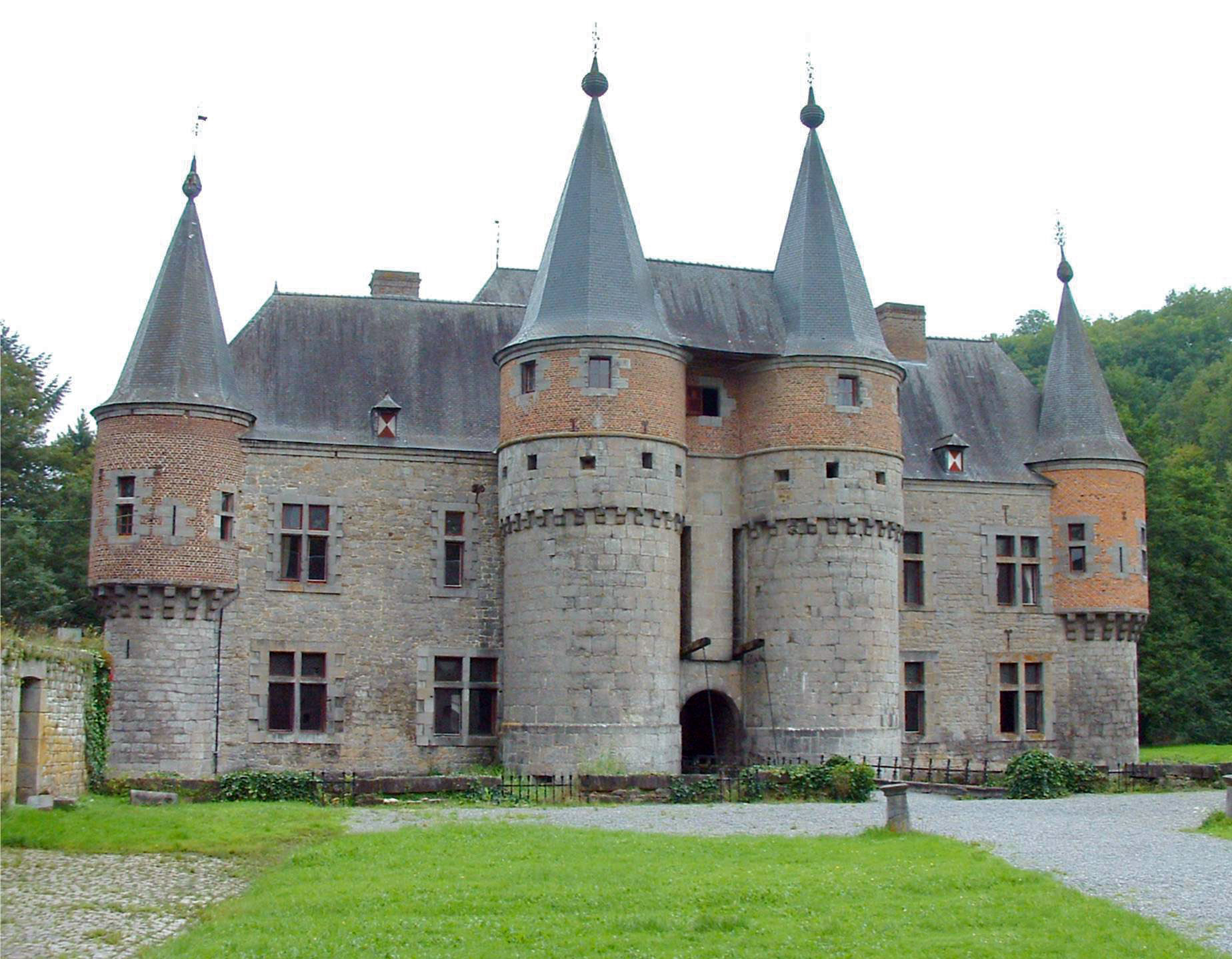
Spontin Castle, Yvoir, Namur

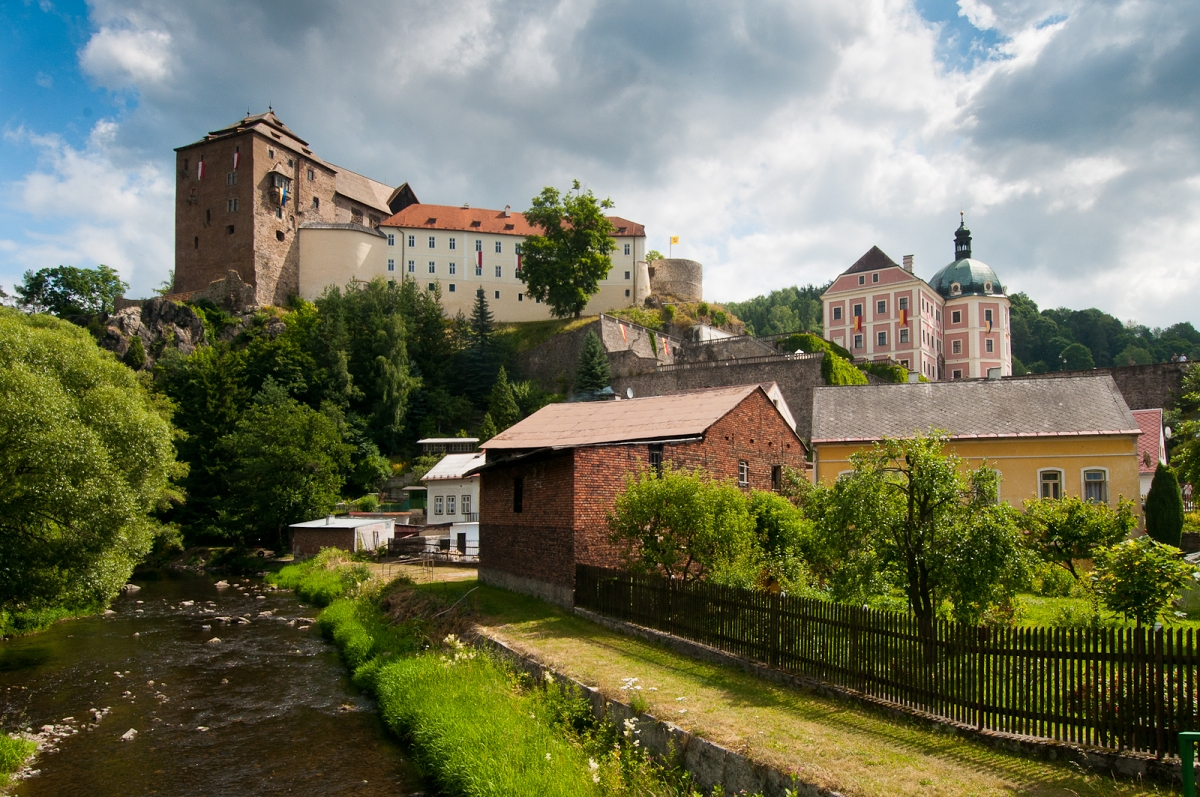
Bečov Castle (formerly Petschau Castle) in Bečov nad Teplou Czech Republic
