= Florennes Castle =

Castle in Wallonia

Château de Beaufort
- Florennes, Wallonia, Belgium
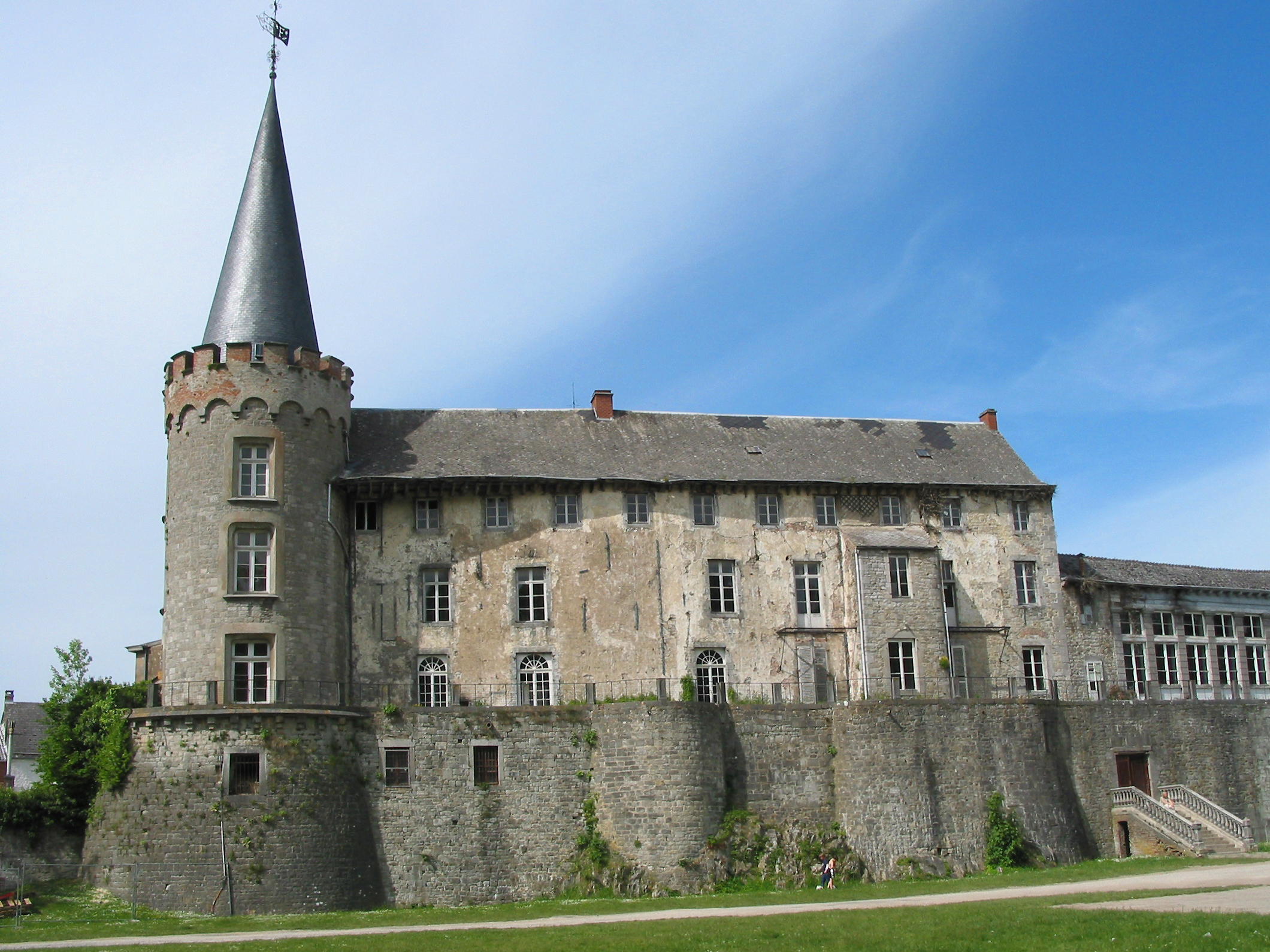

Location
- Coordinates: 50.251205°N 4.601169°E

Site history
- Built: 944
- Built by: Count Eilbert
- Materials: Stone

The Florennes Castle (formerly the Château de Beaufort) in Florennes, Namur, Wallonia, Belgium, is a castle that dates back to the 9th century, although most of the modern structure is much more recent.

== Early history ==
The castle is located on a rocky ridge that stretches westward from the center of the old town of Florennes. There are early records of construction of a wooden castle in Florennes in 842. In 944, Count Eilbert replaced the wooden building with a stone castle surrounded by walls. Eilbert, lord of Florennes, died on 28 March 977. His daughter Alpaïde de Hoegarde (c. 921–986) married Godefroi de Juliers, a Count of Hainaut, and their sons Godefroi and then Arnoul inherited Florennes. The town and castle, owned by Arnoul's grandson Godefroi IV de Florennes (c. 1010–1080), became a fief of the Prince-Bishopric of Liège in 1070. The powerful Rumigny-Florennes family held the castle as vassals of Liège until the late 13th century.

In 1281, Isabelle de Rumigny, who had inherited the castle, married Thibaut of Lorraine, lord of Neufchateau. Thibaut was a warrior prince, and fought in the wars between the kings of France, the emperors of Germany and other potentates. He was in the ranks of the French at the disastrous Battle of Courtrai on 9 July 1302. Thibaut became Duke of Lorraine on 31 December 1302, and had to fight a revolt of his subjects. At one point, he lost control of the castle to the prince-bishop of Liège, but it was restored on 6 June 1307.

The castle was badly damaged during a siege in 1408. Starting in 1417, Isabella, Duchess of Lorraine, undertook work that included building the terrace and, in 1425, laying out a 20 hectares (49 acres) park. A document from 1420 states that the people of Surice, Mazée, Vodelée, Soulme, Omezée, Villers-en-Fagne, Roly, Neuville, Vodecée, Villers-le-Gambon, Franchimont, Corenne and Anthée were required to mount guard over the castle. The castle was damaged again in a siege in 1430. Around 1465 it was said that the castle of the town of Florine was fortified with ditches, bulwarks and other defensive works. These walls still existed in 1517, and the castle was accessed over a drawbridge. The house of Lorraine owned the castle until 1556.

== Later events ==
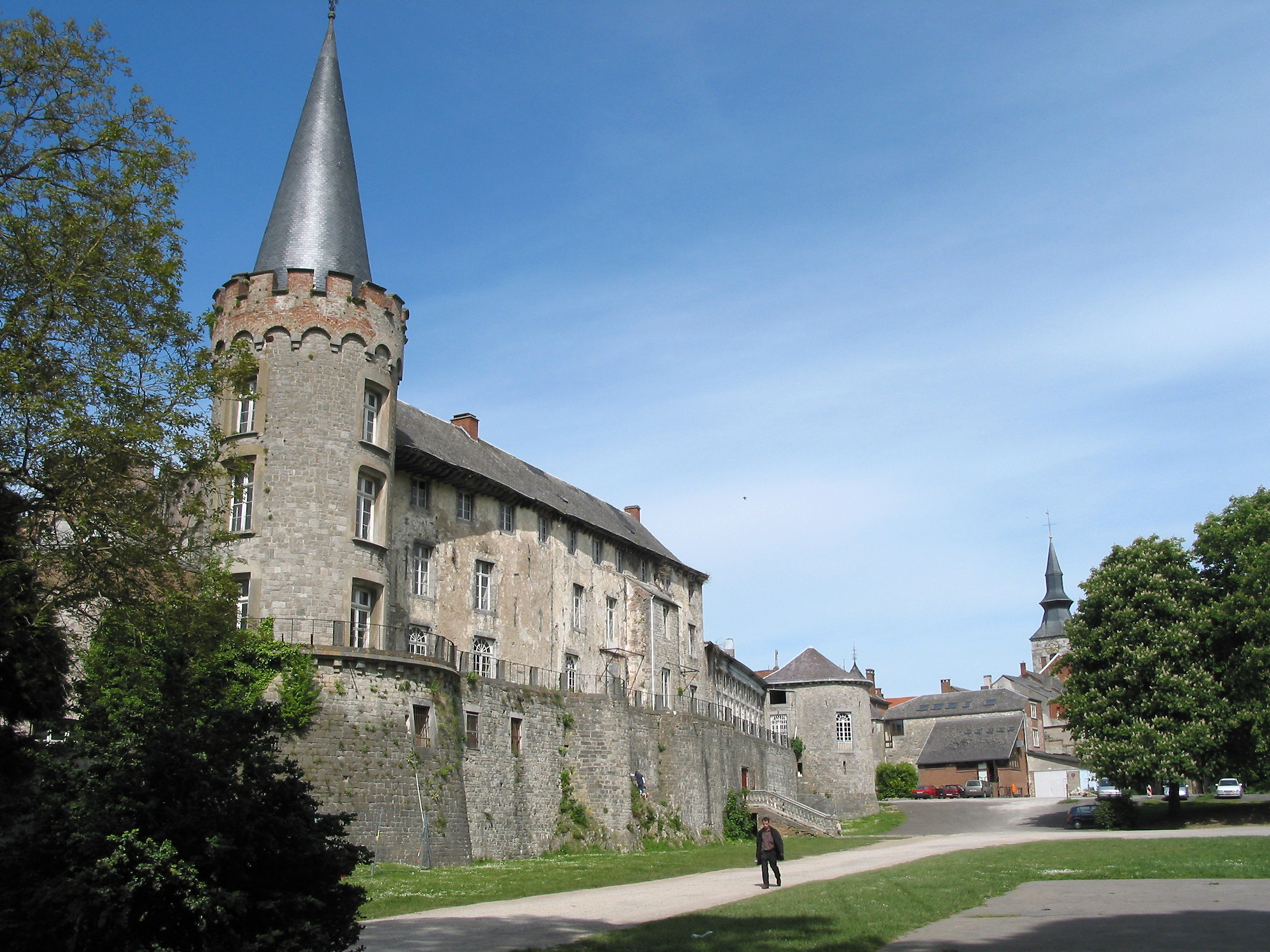
The old castle and the city, 2005.

From 1556 to 1771, the castle was owned by the House of Glymes-Jodoigne. On 14 December 1570, Jean de Glymes, Baron of Florennes and Governor of Philippeville, and his wife Reneé de Vaudemont wrote a will leaving their eldest son Charles de Glymes the land and baronetcy of Florennes. Jean de Glymes died in the castle on 2 July 1575.

The Queen of Navarre, Margaret of Valois, sought refuge in the castle in 1577. She reached the lower court of the castle, but the wife of the lord of the castle refused her admittance in her husband's absence. Don John of Austria, hearing that the queen was staying at the castle, sent 300 men to cut the road and capture the castle. Thinking the queen was within the castle, they camped some way away, planning to take it the next day. The situation was serious but the queen's pleas for sanctuary went unheeded. Finally Charles de Glymes arrived. He reproved his wife and granted the queen admittance. He then provided an escort back to Paris.

The castle passed to the Beaufort-Spontin family in 1771. In 1794, the French revolutionaries seized the castle from its owner, the Duke of Beaufort-Spontin, who had emigrated. In 1800, the municipality of Florennes declared that the castle was a national asset and could not be sold. The Beaufort-Spontins regained the property after the restoration of the monarchy. In 1893, the Beaufort-Spontin family sold the castle and its outbuildings. It was resold to the French Jesuits in 1902, after religious schools had been suppressed in France. They used it for their Saint-Jean Berchmans college, and in 1905 built a novitiate at the southern end of the park.

During World War I, the castle was used as a hospital by the French army and then by the German army. The castle was occupied by the German army again in 1940. In 1942, it was transferred to the air force, who installed an air command post in the novitiate, which was destroyed by fire when they left in 1944. The castle was then occupied by American troops.

In 1950, the Jesuits sold the castle and part of the park to the Missions Seminary (Séminaire des Missions) for use as a free girls school. For the last thirty years the Missions Seminary has leased the castle to the Municipality of Florennes, who in turn have rented it to the Justice of the Peace and the Music Academy. The process of registering the castle buildings and the park with the Institut du Patrimoine as a Wallon Heritage site were initiated in May 2004. Some of the building could continue to be used for educational purposes, while other parts would be restored. The Heritage Department would cover 60% of the costs of restoration.

== Structural changes ==
Most of the fortifications were destroyed in 1704 on the orders of Louis XIV, but some towers and ramparts were still standing in 1740.

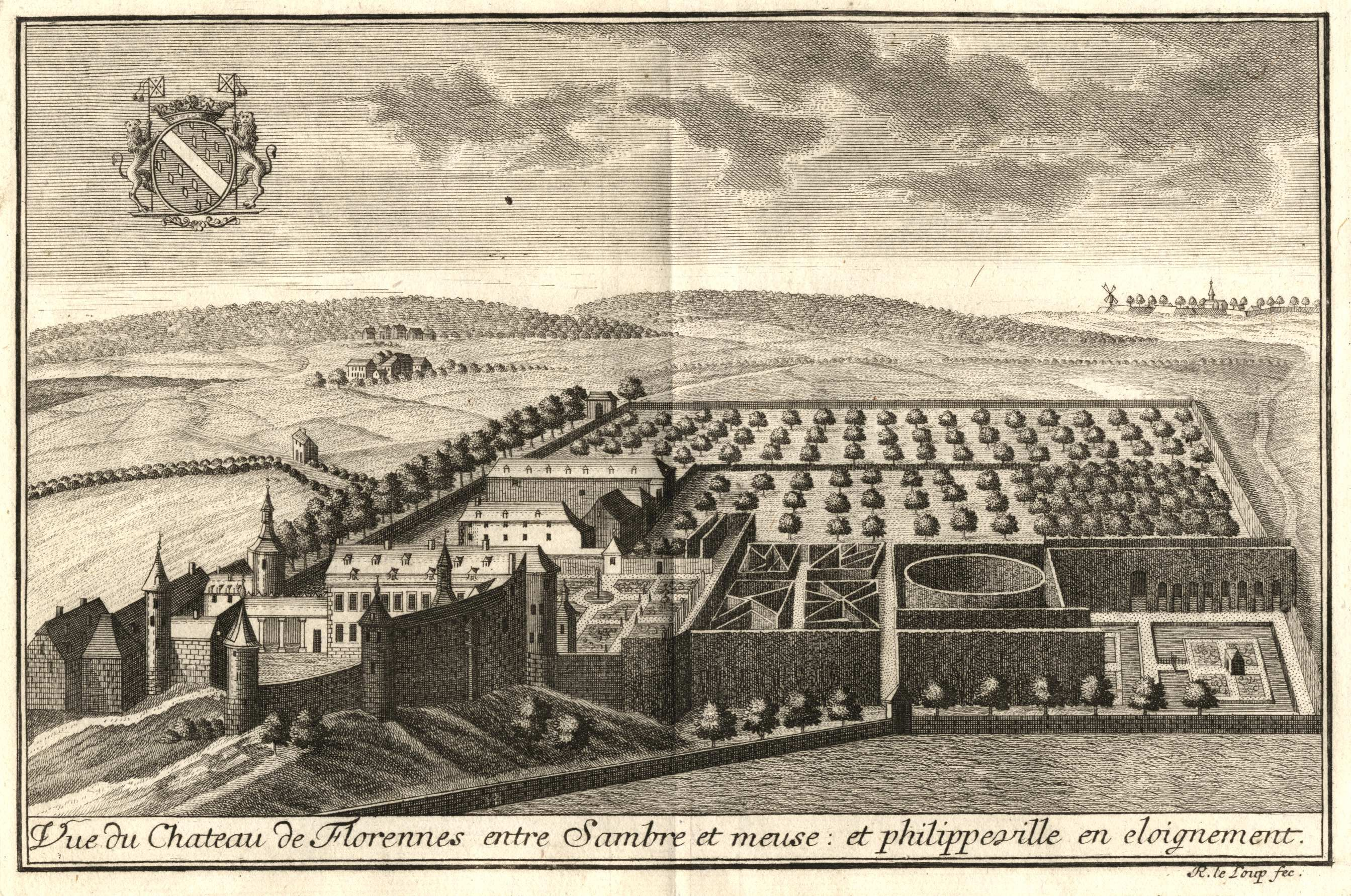
The chateau and grounds around 1744

A 1744 travel book Les Délices du Païs de Liege ("The Delights of the country of Liege") described the property as having several large gothic buildings flanked with towers, and a large garden laid out in excellent taste. A terrace and gallery were decorated with elegant pillars surmounted by statues, and looked over a parterre with a fountain in the center. The garden was laid out with wide paths and held an étoile, or star-shaped design of clipped hedges, a labyrinth and two ponds, each with an island containing a formal garden in the center. The chateau at that time was property of the Count of Glimes de Jodogne, Marquis de Florennes and de Courcelles.

Of the medieval castle, all that remains today are two towers connected by a 20 metres (66 ft) curtain wall along the west side of the courtyard. This wall may well date to the 13th century. The tower on the right is called "the archives". A fire in 1862 damaged the upper part of "this tower and the wall. They were restored and improved, refinished in limestone and decorated with niches. The tower on the left, overlooking the park, was rebuilt in 1868 on the base of a medieval tower.

The main building was built or reconstructed in the 16th century. The thickness of the outer wall indicates that this was once part of the old south curtain wall. The "Billard" tower at the far right when viewed from the park was enlarged and resurfaced in 1830. The orangery, a lower extension running from the main building to the "Billard" tower, was built between 1825 and 1844 on foundations that date from the 18th century. A passage from beneath the building now gives access to stairs that led down to the park, built at the start of the 18th century. A south-facing terrace overlooks the park, which includes a stream-fed pond and has some extremely old trees.

== Sources ==
- "1420 – Les soulmois doivent la garde au château de Florennes". Soulme.
- Bodart, Nicolas (23 April 2010). "le Château" (in French).
- Chalon, Rénier Hubert Ghislain (1869). Les seigneurs de Florennes leurs sceaux et leurs monnaies pour faire suite aux recherches sur les monnaies des comtes. Hayez. p. 8.
- "Château de Beaufort – Florennes". Diamscity. NetOne Ltd. Archived from the original on 2012-10-06.
- "Château des Ducs de Beaufort – Florennes". L’Institut du Patrimoine wallon. Archived from the original on 2013-07-27.
- Cortembos, Thérèse (1982). "Château de Florennes". Le patrimoine monumental de la Belgique: Wallonie. Editions Mardaga. ISBN 978-2-8021-0040-9.
- Goethals, Félix-Victor (1849). Dictionnaire généalogique et héraldique des familles nobles du Royaume de Belgique: D – He. Polack-Duvivier. p. 525.
- Kints, Everard (1744). Les Délices du Païs de Liege. Kints.
- Pattou, Etienne (2007). "Seigneurs de Florennes & Rumigny" (PDF).
- Villenfagne, H. de (1787). L'esprit des journaux françois et étrangers. Valade.
