= Pedro de Alcántara Téllez-Girón, 11th Duke of Osuna =

Spanish peer

The Most Excellent The Duke of Osuna GE
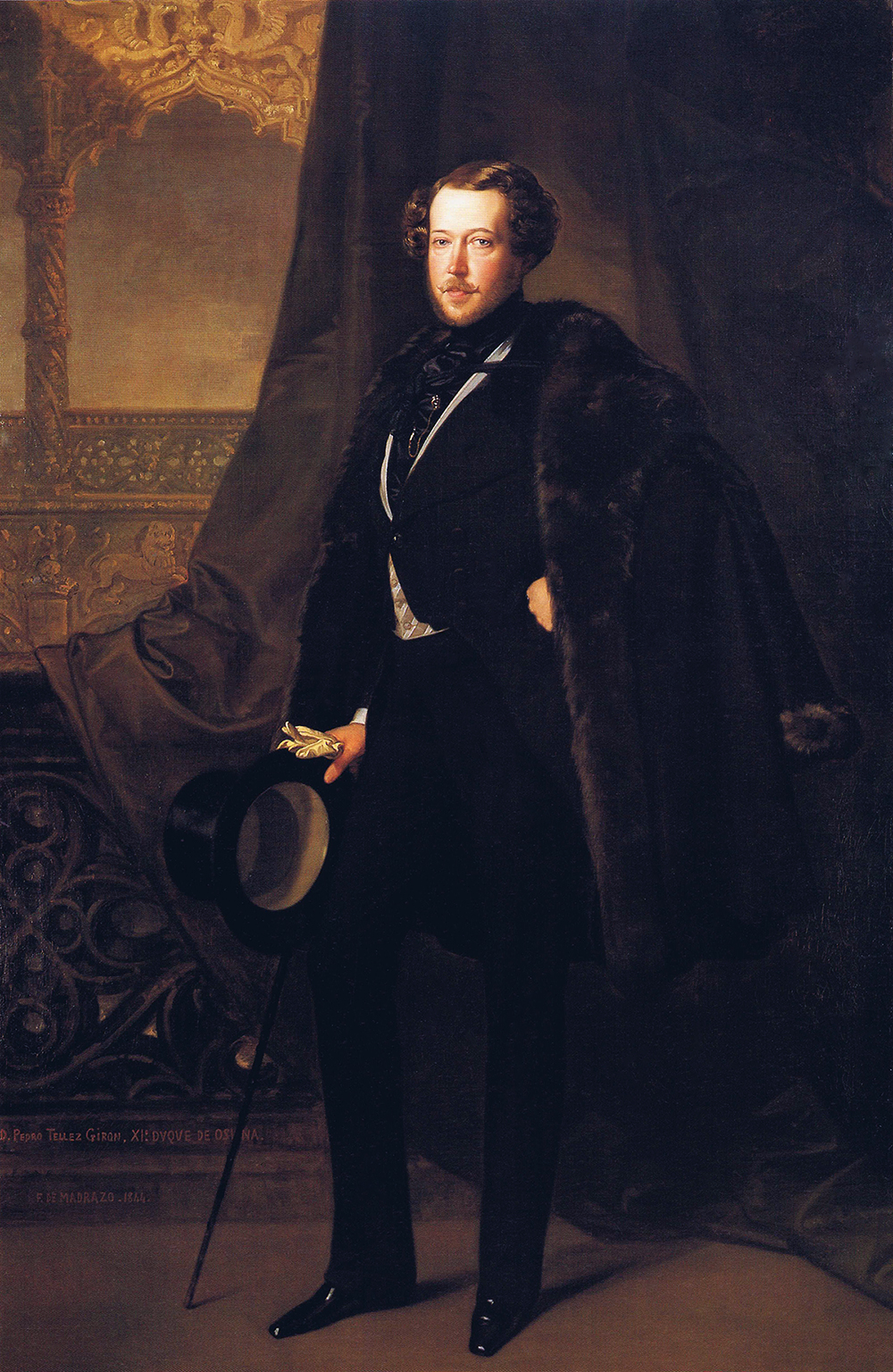
- Portrait by Federico de Madrazo, 1844

Personal details
- Born: Pedro de Alcántara María Tomás Téllez-Girón y Beaufort Spontin; 10 September 1810 Madrid, Spain
- Died: 29 September 1844 (aged 34) Madrid, Spain
- Parents: Francisco de Borja Téllez-Girón, 10th Duke of Osuna (father); María Francisca Beaufort Spontin y Álvarez de Toledo (mother)

Pedro de Alcántara Téllez-Girón y Beaufort Spontin, 11th Duke of Osuna, GE (10 September 1810 – 29 September 1844), was a Spanish peer, head of the House of Osuna. He was one of the most important peers of his time, and was thirteen times a duke, twelve a marquess, thirteen a count and once a viscount.

== Family origins ==
Pedro was the son of Francisco Téllez-Girón, 10th Duke de Osuna and of María Francisca Beaufort Spontin y Álvarez de Toledo, 11th Marchioness of Almenara. The Téllez-Girón family had held title over the Dukedom of Osuna since 1562 with the rise of Pedro Téllez-Girón.

== Biography ==
Pedro inherited the Dukedom of Osuna after the death of his father in 1820.

He died in 1844 without leaving behind any heirs. As a result, all of his titles, including the Dukedoms of the Infantado and of Osuna would pass on to his brother, Mariano Téllez-Girón.

== Titles held ==
=== Dukedoms ===
- XI Duke of Osuna
- X Duke of Pastrana
- XIV Duke of Béjar
- XIII Duke of Arcos
- XIV Duke of Benavente
- XIV Duke of the Infantado

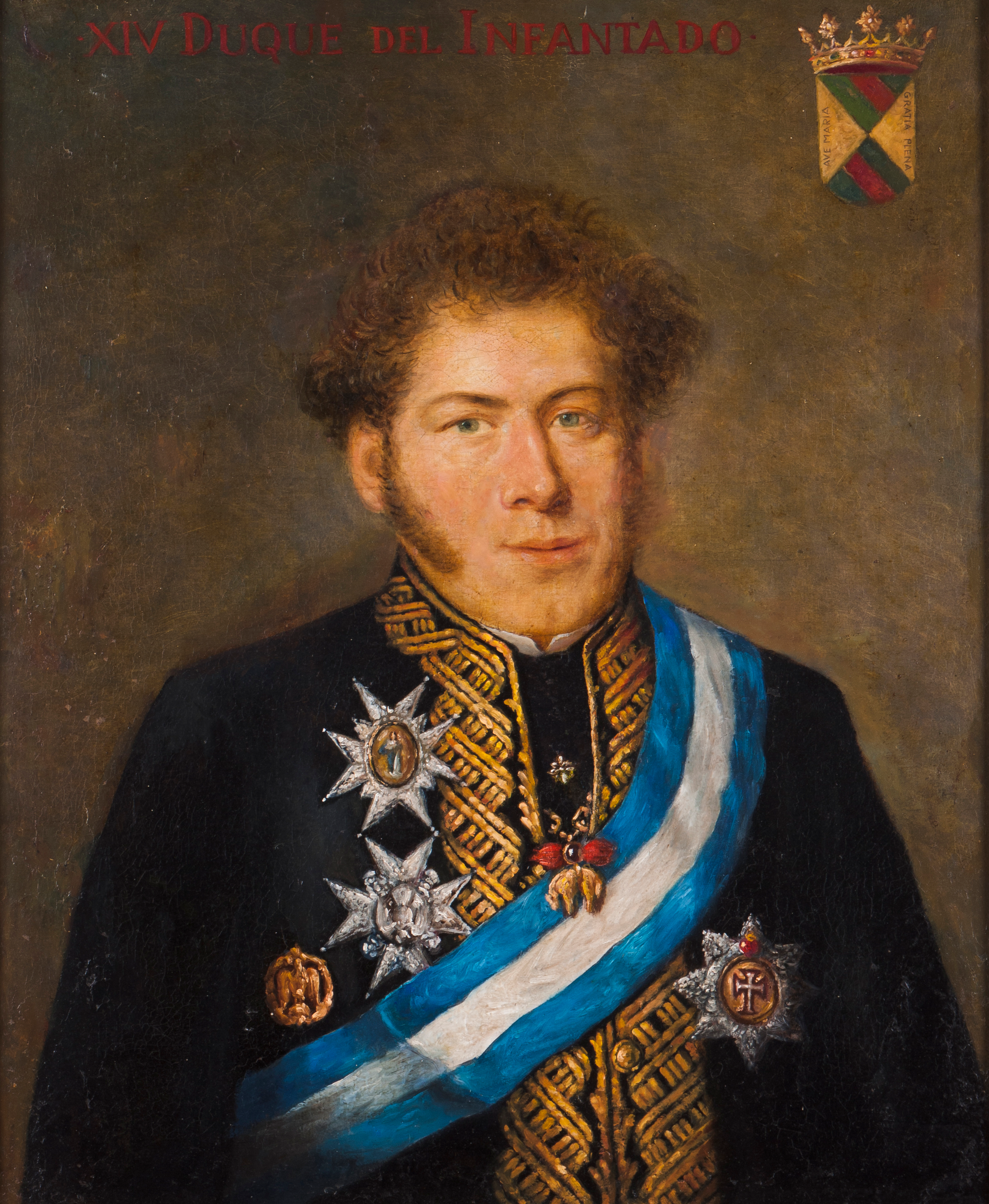
Portrait as Duke of the Infantado

- XV Duke of Plasencia
- XV Duke of Gandía
- X Duke of Mandas y Villanueva
- XIV Duke of Medina de Rioseco
- XI Duke of Lerma
- Duke of Estremera
- Duke of Francavilla

=== Marquessates ===
- XIII Marquess of Peñafiel,
- XV Marquess of Santillana,
- XVI Marquess of Tavara,
- Marquess of Terranova,
- Marquess of Cea,
- Marquess of Gibraleón,
- Marquess of Lombay,
- Marquess of Zahara,
- Marquess of Cenete,
- Marquess of Angüeso,
- Marquess of Almenara,
- Marquess of Algecilla.

=== Countships ===
- XVI Count of Benavente,
- VII Count of Fontanar,
- XV Count of Ureña,
- Count of Mayorga,
- Count of Bañares,
- Count of Oliva,
- Count of Mayalde,
- Count of Belalcázar,
- Count of Real de Manzanares,
- Count of Saldaña,
- Count of the Cid,
- Count of Melgar de la Frontera,
- Count of Bailén,
- Count of Villada.

Spanish nobility
Preceded by Pedro de Alcántara Álvarez de Toledo	Duke of the Infantado; 1841–1844	Succeeded by Mariano Téllez-Girón y Beaufort Spontin
Preceded by Francisco Téllez-Girón	Duke of Osuna; 1820–1844	Succeeded by Mariano Téllez-Girón y Beaufort Spontin
