= Francesco Alvaro Maria Giorgio Ruspoli, 1st Duke of Morignano =

Francesco Alvaro Ruspoli
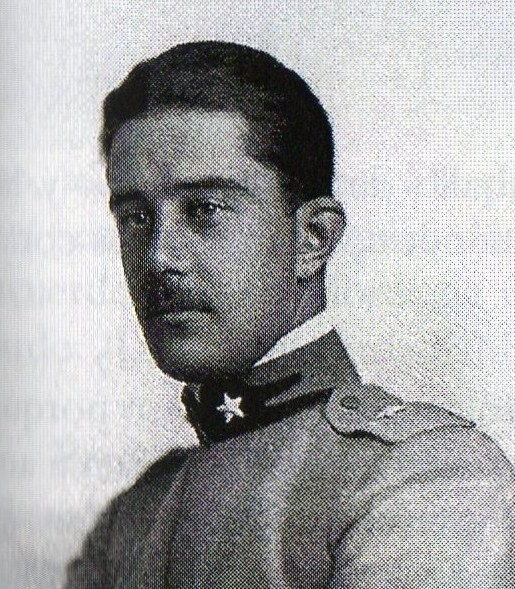
- Prince Francesco Ruspoli.

Duke of Morignano
- Tenure: 30 May 1907 – 2 March 1970
- Predecessor: None
- Successor: Prince Galeazzo Ruspoli
- Born: April 19, 1891; Rome, Kingdom of Italy
- Died: March 2, 1970 (aged 78); Rome, Italy
- Burial: Morignano Pantheon, Campo Verano, Italy
- Spouse: Josepha Giuseppina Pia dei Conti di Brazzà-Cergneu-Savorgnan
- Issue: Prince Galeazzo Maria Ruspoli
Names
- Francesco Alvaro Maria Giorgio dei Principi Ruspoli
- House: Ruspoli
- Father: Prince Emanuele Ruspoli
- Mother: Josephine Mary Beers-Curtis

Don Francesco Alvaro Maria Giorgio dei Principi Ruspoli (April 19, 1891 – March 2, 1970) was an Italian nobleman, the 1st Duca di Morignano, Nobile di Viterbo e di Orvieto, Patrizio Romano and Prince of the Holy Roman Empire.

Born in Rome, he was the son of Emanuele Ruspoli, 1st Prince of Poggio Suasa and third wife Josephine Mary Beers-Curtis.

== Education ==
Francesco was tutored as a boy by the Englishman Eustace Virgo, who dedicated his second novel Honour Lost, All Lost: A Mystery of Modern Rome (written under the pseudonym E. V. de Fontmell) to him. Francesco was the unrequited love of his life. Through the good offices of his friend Robert Hugh Benson, Virgo arranged for Francesco and his young brother to attend Eton College. Francesco was at Eton (where the boys called him 'Frank Ruspoli') from September 1904 to December 1909, in R S de Havilland's house. His brother Eugenio was in the same house from September 1907 to July 1912. Partly through the agency of Eustace Virgo, Francesco was once offered the throne of Albania.

== Marriage and child ==
He married in Rome, January 27, 1920 Josepha Giuseppina Pia dei Conti di Brazzà-Cergneu-Savorgnan (Reggio Emilia, September 27, 1898 – Fregene, April 29, 1992), Nobile Romana and Patrizia Sabina, by whom he had an only son:

- Galeazzo Maria Alvise Emanuele Ruspoli, 2nd Duke of Morignano.

== Cultural and charitable interests ==
- President of Italian Golf Federation (1944 – 1968).
- President of Acqua Santa Golf Club Course.
- President of Olgiata Golf Club (1961 – 1964).
- Member of Italian Olympic Committee.

== See also ==
- Ruspoli

Italian nobility
Preceded by New title	1st Duke of Morignano; 30 May 1907 – 2 March 1970	Succeeded by Galeazzo Maria Ruspoli, 2nd Duke of Morignano
