= Count of Fontanar =

Countship of Fontanar
- Creation date: 17 February 1645
- Created by: Philip IV
- Peerage: Peerage of Spain
- First holder: Cristóbal Benavente y Benavides, 1st Count of Fontanar
- Present holder: Juan Carvajal y Argüelles, 13th Count of Fontanar

Count of Fontanar (Spanish: Conde de Fontanar) is a hereditary title in the Peerage of Spain, granted in 1645 by Philip IV to Cristóbal Benavente, Ambassador in France, Venice and England.

== Counts of Fontanar (1645) ==
- Cristóbal Benavente y Benavides, 1st Count of Fontanar
- Melchor Benavente y Benavides, 2nd Count of Fontanar
- Teresa de Benavente y Benavides, 3rd Countess of Fontanar
- Alejo de Guzmán y Pacheco, 4th Count of Fontanar
- Ignacio Pimentel y Borja, 5th Count of Fontanar
- Francisco de Borja Téllez-Girón y Pimentel, 6th Count of Fontanar
- Pedro de Alcantara Téllez-Girón y Beaufort Spontin, 7th Count of Fontanar
- Mariano Téllez-Girón y Beaufort Spontin, 8th Count of Fontanar
- Francisco Carvajal y Hurtado de Mendoza, 9th Count of Fontanar
- Francisco de Borja Carvajal y Xifré, 10th Count of Fontanar
- Ignacio Juan Carvajal y Urquijo, 11th Count of Fontanar
- Francisco de Borja Carvajal y Argüelles, 12th Count of Fontanar
- Juan Carvajal y Argüelles, 13th Count of Fontanar

== Bibliography ==
- Hidalgos de España, Real Asociación de (2018). Elenco de Grandezas y Títulos Nobiliarios Españoles. Ediciones Hidalguía. ISBN 978-84-94841-02-6.
