= Carlo Emanuele Ruspoli, 3rd Duke of Morignano =

Carlo Emanuele Ruspoli

Duke of Morignano
- Tenure: 21 February 2003 – present
- Predecessor: Prince Galeazzo Ruspoli
- Born: 29 October 1949 (age 77); Rome, Italy
- Spouse: María de Gracia de Solís-Beaumont y Téllez-Girón, 19th Duchess of Plasencia (m. 1975; died 2021) Ana Satrústegui
- Issue: Princess María Ruspoli
Names
- Carlo Emanuele Maria dei Principi Ruspoli
- House: Ruspoli
- Father: Prince Galeazzo Ruspoli
- Mother: María Elisa Soler y Borghi

Don Carlo Emanuele Maria (Carlos Manuel María) Ruspoli, Duke of Morignano (born 29 October 1949) is a nobleman and architect. Firstborn son of Galeazzo Maria Alvise Emanuele Ruspoli, 2nd Duke of Morignano and first wife Doña María Elisa Soler y Borghi (San Salvador, 25 June 1926 – Madrid, 15 November 2016), of the Marquises of Rabell. He is Doctor of Architecture of the University of Rome, writer, anthropologist and researcher.

== Marriage and child ==
He married at Church of Our Lady of Peace in La Puebla de Montalbán, near Toledo, Toledo Province, 11 October 1975 Doña María de Gracia de Solís-Beaumont y Téllez-Girón, Lasso de la Vega y Duque de Estrada (Madrid, 12 March 1957 – Madrid, 20 February 2021), Grandee of Spain, 19th Duchess of Plasencia (22 February 1974), of the Dukes of Osuna and Gandía also Spanish Red Cross nurse and restorer, by whom he had an only daughter:

- Donna María de Gracia Giacinta Ruspoli y Solís-Beaumont, Soler y Téllez-Girón dei Principi Ruspoli (Madrid, 16 June 1977 –), 16th Marquesa del Villar de Grajanejos (Order of 1 December 1995 by cedance of her mother and Letter of 25 December 1995), and Nobile di Viterbo. She married, 28 November 2009 Don Javier Isidro González de Gregorio y Molina (Madrid, 7 November 1971 –), of the Condes de La Puebla de Valverde. She is an MBA and her husband is a Doctor of Laws, Bachelor of Law and Executive MBA. They had two daughters, Doña María de Gracia y Doña Blanca Micaela González de Gregorio y Ruspoli.

== Notable published works ==
- "Retratos. Anécdotas y secretos de los linajes Borja, Téllez-Girón, Marescotti y Ruspoli" (2011). ISBN 9788488833068
- "Asesinato en el Letrán (2012). ISBN 9781463317607 & ISBN 9781463317614
- "El Confaloniero" (2012). ISBN 9781463317669 & ISBN 9781463317676
- "El Profeso. Una epopeya de un héroe en la Edad Media" (2012). ISBN 9781463317485 & ISBN 9781463317508
- "El Profeso en Tíbet" (2012). ISBN 9781463317683 & ISBN 9781463317690
- "Muerte de Profesos" (2012). ISBN 9781463317638 & ISBN 9781463317645
- "Orientalia. Antropología, cultura, religión, historia y leyendas de Oriente" (2012). ISBN 9781463317829 & ISBN 9781463317836
- "El Profeso y la Monja" (2013). ASIN B00DVRJRBC
- "El Profeso y el Diablo" (2013). ASIN B00DWGUCPC
- "El Profeso y el Emperador" (2013). ASIN B00DW6NLPK
- "El Profeso y el Grial" (2013). ASIN B00DWH1B4C
- "La Hija del Profeso" (2013). Winner of the Sial Pigmalión International Literary Award (2013). ASIN B00DW6TADW
- "Los Bellegarde de Saint-Lary" (2013). ASIN B00DWWOO50
- "El Profeso y el Opio" (2014). ISBN 9788415916604
- "El Profeso y la Masonería" (2015). ISBN 9788415916796
- "El Profeso y la Parapsicología" (2015). Winner of the Rubén Darío International Literary Award (2015). ISBN 9788416447114
- "La Hija del Profeso" (2016). ISBN 9788416447305
- "La Duquesa de Plasencia. Historia de un gran amor" (2022). ISBN 9788418888557
- "El Profeso y el Faraón" (2024). ISBN 9788410389069
- "El Profeso. El Origen de la Leyenda" (2025). ISBN 9788410389847
- "El Profeso y el Chamán" (2025) ISBN 9791387785499
- "El Profeso y los Borgia" (2026). ISBN 9791387785772

== Decorations ==
- Knight of Honour and Devotion in Obedience of the Sovereign Military Order of Malta.
- Knight Grand Cross Pro Merito Melitensi [Civilian Class] of the Sovereign Military Order of Malta.
- Knight Grand Cross of Justice of the Sacred Military Constantinian Order of Saint George (1990).
- Knight Commander of the Pontifical Equestrian Order of Saint Gregory the Great (04/06/2004).
- Officer's Cross of the Order of Isabella the Catholic.
- Commander of the Order of Merit of the Italian Republic (14 March 2005).

== Cultural and charitable interests ==
- Academic Numerary of the Spanish Melitense Academy of the Order of Malta.
- Contributor to the Matritense Royal Academy of Heraldry and Genealogy.
- National Association of the Order of Malta of El Salvador.
- Foundation for Sustainable Development.
- New Future Association.
- Religious brotherhoods and associations in Seville and Espejo.

== See also ==
- Ruspoli.

Italian nobility
Preceded by Galeazzo Maria Ruspoli, 2nd Duke of Morignano	3rd Duke of Morignano; 21 February 2003 – present	Succeeded by Incumbent
