= Marquess of Terranova =

Marquessate of Terranova
- Creation date: 23 December 1614
- Created by: Philip III
- Peerage: Peerage of Spain
- First holder: Pedro Maza de Lizana y Carroz, 1st Marquess of Terranova
- Present holder: Gabriel Squella y Duque de Estrada, 16th Marquess of Terranova

Marquess of Terranova (Spanish: Marqués de Terranova), is a title of Spanish nobility. It was granted along with the Dukedom of Mandas to Pedro Maza de Lizana on 23 December 1614 by king Philip III.

Pedro Maza de Lizana was the son of Baltasar Maza de Lizana, lord of Castalla and Ayora in Valencia, fief of Mandas in Sardinia, and of Francisca Hurtado de Mendoza, daughter of Luis Hurtado de Mendoza, 2nd Marquess of Mondéjar, and Catalina de Mendoza, of the Counts of Monteagudo. He descended from the male line of the Ladrón de Vilanova (or Pallás) family, Viscounts of Chelva and Counts of Sinarcas, but his father adopted the last name Maza de Lizana, of which he had no ancestry, as a testamentary condition of Brianda Maza y Carroz, a distant relative of him, who designated him as the universal heir of her vast assets.

As the 12th Marquess died childless, the title became vacant until it was rehabilitated in the early 1900s by Alfonso XIII in favour of José Finat y Carvajal, a descendant of the 9th Marquess. In 1949, the title passed into a different family after a long judiciary process that ruled in favour of Ricardo Squella as a more favourable descendant.

== Marquesses of Terranova (1614) ==
- Pedro Maza de Lizana y Carroz, 1st Marquess of Terranova (1614–1617)
- Juan Hurtado de Mendoza, 2nd Marquess of Terranova (1617–1624)
- Ana de Mendoza, 3rd Marchioness of Terranova (1624–1629)
- Francisco Diego López de Zúñiga y Sotomayor, 4th Marquess of Terranova (1629–1636)
- Alfonso López de Zúñiga Sotomayor y Mendoza, 5th Marquess of Terranova (1636–1660)
- Juan Manuel López de Zúñiga Sotomayor y Mendoza, 6th Marquess of Terranova (1660–1660)
- Manuel Diego López de Zúñiga Sotomayor y Sarmiento, 7th Marquess of Terranova (1660–1686)
- Juan Manuel López de Zúñiga Sotomayor y Castor 8th Marquess of Terranova (1686–1747)
- Joaquín Diego López de Zúñiga Sotomayor y Castro, 9th Marquess of Terranova (1747–1777)
- María Josefa Pimentel y Téllez-Girón, 10th Marchioness of Terranova (1777–1834)
- Pedro de Alcántara Tellez-Giron y Beaufort-Spontin, 11th Marquess of Terranova (1834–1844)
- Mariano Téllez-Girón y Beaufort Spontin, 12th Marquess of Terranova (1844–1882)
- José Finat y Carvajal, 13th Marquess of Terranova
- José Finat y Escrivá de Romaní, 14th Marquess of Terranova
- Ricardo Squella y Martorell, 15th Marquess of Terranova
- Gabriel Squella y Duque de Estrada, 16th Marquess of Terranova

== See also ==
- Duke of Mandas
