= Galeazzo Maria Alvise Emanuele Ruspoli, 2nd Duke of Morignano =

Galeazzo Maria Ruspoli

Duke of Morignano
- Tenure: 2 March 1970 – 21 February 2003
- Predecessor: Prince Francesco Ruspoli
- Successor: Prince Carlo Emanuele Ruspoli
- Born: 27 March 1922; Rome, Kingdom of Italy
- Died: 21 February 2003 (aged 80); Issy-les-Moulineaux, France
- Burial: Morignano Pantheon, Campo Verano, Italy
- Spouse: María Elisa Soler y Borghi; Giovanna Carla Nannini
- Issue: Prince Carlo Emanuele Ruspoli; Prince Lorenzo Francesco Ruspoli; Princess Ginevra Ruspoli
Names
- Galeazzo Maria Alvise Emanuele dei Principi Ruspoli
- House: Ruspoli
- Father: Prince Francesco Ruspoli
- Mother: Josefa Giuseppina Pia di Brazzà-Cergneu-Savorgnan

Don Galeazzo Maria Alvise Emanuele dei Principi Ruspoli (March 27, 1922 – February 21, 2003) was the 2nd Duca di Morignano, Nobile di Viterbo e di Orvieto, Patrizio Romano and Prince of the Holy Roman Empire, only son of Francesco Alvaro Maria Giorgio Ruspoli, 1st Duke of Morignano and wife Donna Josefa Giuseppina Pia dei Conti di Brazzà-Cergneu-Savorgnan, Nobile Romana and Patrizia Sabina. He was Doctor of Architecture of the University of Rome.

== Marriages and children ==
His first marriage was in Rome on January 10, 1949 to Salvadoran Doña María Elisa Soler y Borghi (San Salvador, June 25, 1926 – Madrid, November 15, 2016), later marriage annulled in Rome by the Sacred Rota), by whom he had two sons:

- Carlo Emanuele Ruspoli, 3rd Duke of Morignano.
- Don Lorenzo Francesco Maria dei Principi Ruspoli-Poggio Suasa (Rome, July 22, 1953 – Rome, September 29, 1961). Died young of leukemia.

He secondly married religiously in Rome, December 7, 1960 Giovanna Carla Nannini dei Baroni di Casabianca (Bologna, January 14, 1933 – Neuilly-sur-Seine, July 10, 1994), by whom he had an only daughter:

- Donna Ginevra dei Principi Ruspoli-Poggio Suasa (Rome, September 15, 1962 –), art dealer, married in Rome, January 16, 1988 Frédéric Philippe Marie François, Comte de La Rochefoucauld (Paris, November 20, 1955 –), by whom she had two daughters and a son (Roxane 1989, Lorenzo 1991, Mélusine 1996).

== Notable published works ==
- "I Ruspoli. Da Carlo Magno a el Alamein" (2001). ISBN 9788884400437

== Decorations ==
- Knight Grand Cross of Honour and Devotion of the Sovereign Military Order of Malta.

== Cultural and charitable interests ==
- President of Acqua Santa Golf Club Course.
- President of Olgiata Golf Club Course.

== See also ==
- Ruspoli

Italian nobility
Preceded by Francesco Alvaro Ruspoli, 1st Duke of Morignano	2nd Duke of Morignano; 2 March 1970 – 21 February 2003	Succeeded by Carlo Emanuele Ruspoli, 3rd Duke of Morignano
