= Luis Morenés, 15th Count of Villada =

15th Count Of Villada

The Most Excellent The Count of Villada GE
- Born: 29 November 1903; San Sebastián, Spain
- Died: 3 January 1987 (aged 83); Madrid, Spain
- Spouse: María del Socorro Areces y Méndez de Vigo (m. 1927)
- Children: 2
- Parents: Luis Morenés y García-Alessón, 1st Marquess of Bassecourt (father); María de las Mercedes de Arteaga y Echagüe, 16th Marchioness of Argueso (mother)

Luis Morenés y de Arteaga, 15th Count of Villada, GE (29 November 1903 – 3 January 1987) was a Spanish nobleman and professional hunter.

== Early life ==
Born in San Sebastián, he was the eldest son of Luis Morenés y García-Alessón, 1st Marquess of Bassecourt, commander of the Legion of Honour, and his wife María de las Mercedes de Arteaga y Echagüe, 16th Marchioness of Argüeso, 14th Marchioness of Campoo, 17th Countess of Bañares and 14th Countess of Villada. His maternal grandfather was the 16th Duke of Infantado.

Morenés inherited the Countship of Villada the day he was born. He succeeded in his parents' titles when these died in 1950; his father Luis as Marquess of Bassecourt and his mother María de las Mercedes as Marquess of Argüeso and a personal Grandeeship of Spain.

== Hunting ==
Up until the Spanish Civil War, he had been professionally dedicated to pigeon-shooting, where he won more than 300 competitions. In the 1940s, he became president of the Madrid Pigeon-Shooting Club. Along with fellow American pigeon-shooter Homer Clark Jr., he designed a unique gun. Being the latter keen on guns with short barrels, and using one of his damaged ones, they both created a prototype with the help of Victor Sarasqueta, Purveyor of Spain's Royal House. It proved successful; Villada's daughter María Antonia was proclaimed world champion of pigeon-shooting in Rome in 1956.

Morenés became a regular guest at some of the most famed fincas of Spain. He frequented hunts at Picos de Europa, Cabañeros, La Cepilla, Clavería (where he harvested one of the biggest Iberian wolves to date), El Robledo, El Pardo, La Toledana, Doñana and El Castañar. In 1955, he hosted a montería for the Sha of Persia.

The Count of Villada was one of the many "golden age Spanish hunters" that became a board member of the International Council for Game and Wildlife Conservation and was also a member of the Amateur Trapshooting Association. In 1950, he was one of the pioneers that established the National Board of Trophy Hunting Homologation along with Franz Joseph von Seefried, the 11th Marquess of Valdueza and its first president, the 8th Count of Yebes.

An Iberian ibex enthusiast, he stalked in Gredos with the Silvela brothers (grandchildren of Francisco Silvela) for decades. They would set up base camps in the mountains and live in tents for weeks.

== Issue ==
In June 1927, he married María del Socorro Areces y Méndez de Vigo at Iglesia del Sagrado Corazón de María in Madrid. They had two children:

- Luis Morenés y Areces, 18th Marquess of Argüeso (1929-2000)
- María Antonia Morenés y Areces

== Later life ==
In 1980, he suffered a grave illness during a trip to Switzerland. He spent his last years in Madrid, restoring paintings in the mornings and enjoying bridge games in the afternoon with his friends at Puerta de Hierro. In 1981, the Royal Hunting Federation of Spain awarded him the Gold Medal for Merit in Hunting.

He died in Madrid in January 1987.

== Titles and styles ==
=== Titles ===
- Grandee of Spain (personal)
- 17th Marquess of Argüeso
- 2nd Marquess of Bassecourt
- 15th Count of Villada

=== Styles ===
- 29 November 1903 – 25 April 1950: The Most Excellent The Count of Villada
- 25 April 1950 – 3 January 1987: The Most Excellent The Marquess of Argüeso

== Bibliography ==
- Priego, Count of (2017). Cazadores Españoles del Siglo XX. Turner Publicaciones. ISBN 978-84-16714-29-2.

Spanish nobility
Preceded by María de las Mercedes de Arteaga y Echagüe	Count of Villada; 29 November 1903 – 3 January 1987	Succeeded by Luis Morenés y Areces
Preceded by María de las Mercedes de Arteaga y Echagüe	Marquess of Argüeso; 25 April 1950 – 3 January 1987	Succeeded by Luis Morenés y Areces
Preceded by Luis Morenés y García-Alessón	Marquess of Bassecourt; 24 February 1950 – 3 January 1987	Succeeded by Luis Morenés y Areces
