= Marquess of Almenara (1587) =

Marquessate of Almenara
- Creation date: 1587
- Created by: Philip II
- Peerage: Peerage of Spain
- First holder: Iñigo López de Mendoza y Manrique de Luna, 1st Marquess of Almenara
- Present holder: María del Pilar Álvarez de las Asturias-Bohórquez y Silva, 17th Marchioness of Almenara

Marquess of Almenara (Spanish: Marqués de Almenara) is a hereditary title in the Peerage of Spain, granted in 1587 by Philip II to Iñigo López de Mendoza, his representative in the Kingdom of Aragon.

Iñigo López de Mendoza went to trial with his first cousin, the Princess of Éboli, to claim the Lordship of Puebla de Almenara, founded by their great-grandfather, Cardinal Mendoza, who had established that it could only be inherited through the male line. He subsequently won the lawsuit, becoming Lord of Almenara and in 1587, he became the 1st Marquess of Almenara by the wishes of the king.

In 1623, Philip IV granted another title with the same name, yet making reference to a completely different location near Peñaflor, in the Province of Seville. This subsequent title is sometimes referred to as "Marquess of Dehesa de Almenara" to distinguish it from the older title, despite the official name being the same.

== Marquesses of Almenara (1587) ==
- Íñigo López de Mendoza y Manrique de Luna, 1st Marquess of Almenara
- Diego López de Mendoza y Manrique de Luna, 2nd Marquess of Almenara
- Diego de Mendoza y de la Cerda, 3rd Marquess of Almenara
- Ruy Gómez de Silva y Mendoza, 4th Marquess of Almenara
- Rodrigo Díaz de Vivar y de Silva, 5th Marquess of Almenara
- Gregorio María de Silva y Mendoza, 6th Marquess of Almenara
- Juan de Dios de Silva y Haro, 7th Marquess of Almenara
- María Teresa de Silva y Gutiérrez de los Ríos, 8th Marchioness of Almenara
- Pedro de Alcántara Álvarez de Toledo y Silva, 9th Marquess of Almenara
- María de los Dolores Leopoldina Álvarez de Toledo y Salm-Salm, 10th Marchioness of Almenara
- María Francisca Beaufort Spontin y Álvarez de Toledo, 11th Marchioness of Almenara
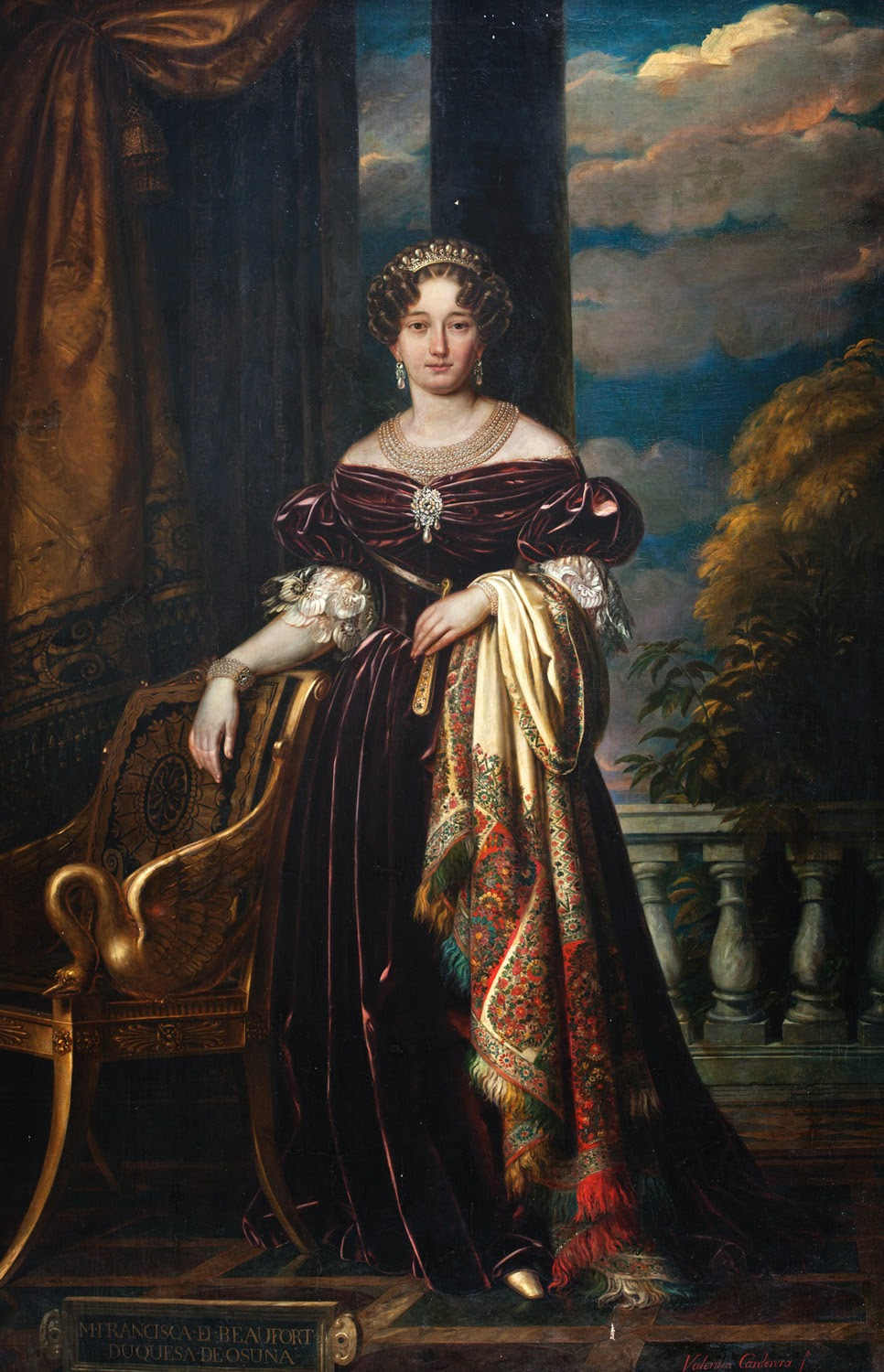
  Portrait of María Francisca Beaufort Spontin, 11th Marchioness of Almenara, by Valentín Carderera
- Pedro de Alcántara Téllez-Girón y Beaufort Spontin, 12th Marquess of Almenara
- Mariano Téllez-Girón y Beaufort Spontin, 13th Marquess of Almenara
- María Teresa de Arteaga y Echagüe, 14th Marchioness of Almenara
- José Álvarez de las Asturias-Bohórquez y Arteaga, 15th Marquess of Almenara
- Jaime Álvarez de las Asturias-Bohórquez y Silva, 16th Marquess of Almenara
- María del Pilar Álvarez de las Asturias-Bohórquez y Silva, 17th Marchioness of Almenara

== See also ==
- Spanish nobility
- House of Beaufort-Spontin

== Bibliography ==
- Salazar de Mendoza, Pedro (1625). Crónica del gran cardenal de España, don Pedro González de Mendoza.
