= Duke of Mandas =

Title of Spanish nobility

Dukedom of Mandas y Villanueva
- Creation date: 23 December 1614
- Created by: Philip III
- Peerage: Peerage of Spain
- First holder: Pedro Maza de Lizana y Carroz, 1st Duke of Mandas
- Present holder: Ricardo Ignacio de la Huerta y Ozores, 16th Duke of Mandas

Duke of Mandas y Villanueva (Spanish: Duque de Mandas y Villanueva), commonly known as Duke of Mandas, is a title of Spanish nobility that is accompanied by the dignity of Grandee of Spain. It was granted along with the Marquessate of Terranova to Pedro Maza de Lizana on 23 December 1614 by king Philip III.

Pedro Maza de Lizana was the son of Baltasar Maza de Lizana, lord of Castalla and Ayora in Valencia, fief of Mandas in Sardinia, and of Francisca Hurtado de Mendoza, daughter of Luis Hurtado de Mendoza, 2nd Marquess of Mondéjar, and Catalina de Mendoza, of the Counts of Monteagudo. He descended from the male line of the Ladrón de Vilanova (or Pallás) family, Viscounts of Chelva and Counts of Sinarcas, but his father adopted the last name Maza de Lizana, of which he had no ancestry, as a testamentary condition of Brianda Maza y Carroz, a distant relative of him, who designated him as the universal heir of her vast assets.

As the 12th Duke died childless, the dukedom became vacant for 2 years until it was rehabilitated in 1884 by Alfonso XII in favour of the 12th Duke's niece, María Cristina Fernanda Brunetti y Gayoso de los Cobos, 18th Countess of Belalcázar and sister of the Duke of Arcos.

The name of the title makes reference to the Sardinian municipality of Mandas, and most likely to the nearby town of Villanova (Villanueva), both belonging to the province of South Sardinia. Although the second part of the denomination also seems to allude to one of the first holder's maternal surnames, it also might borrow it from the eponymous town in Benagéber, which was the manor of the Ladrón de Pallás family, Lords of Benagéber and Counts of Sinarcas.

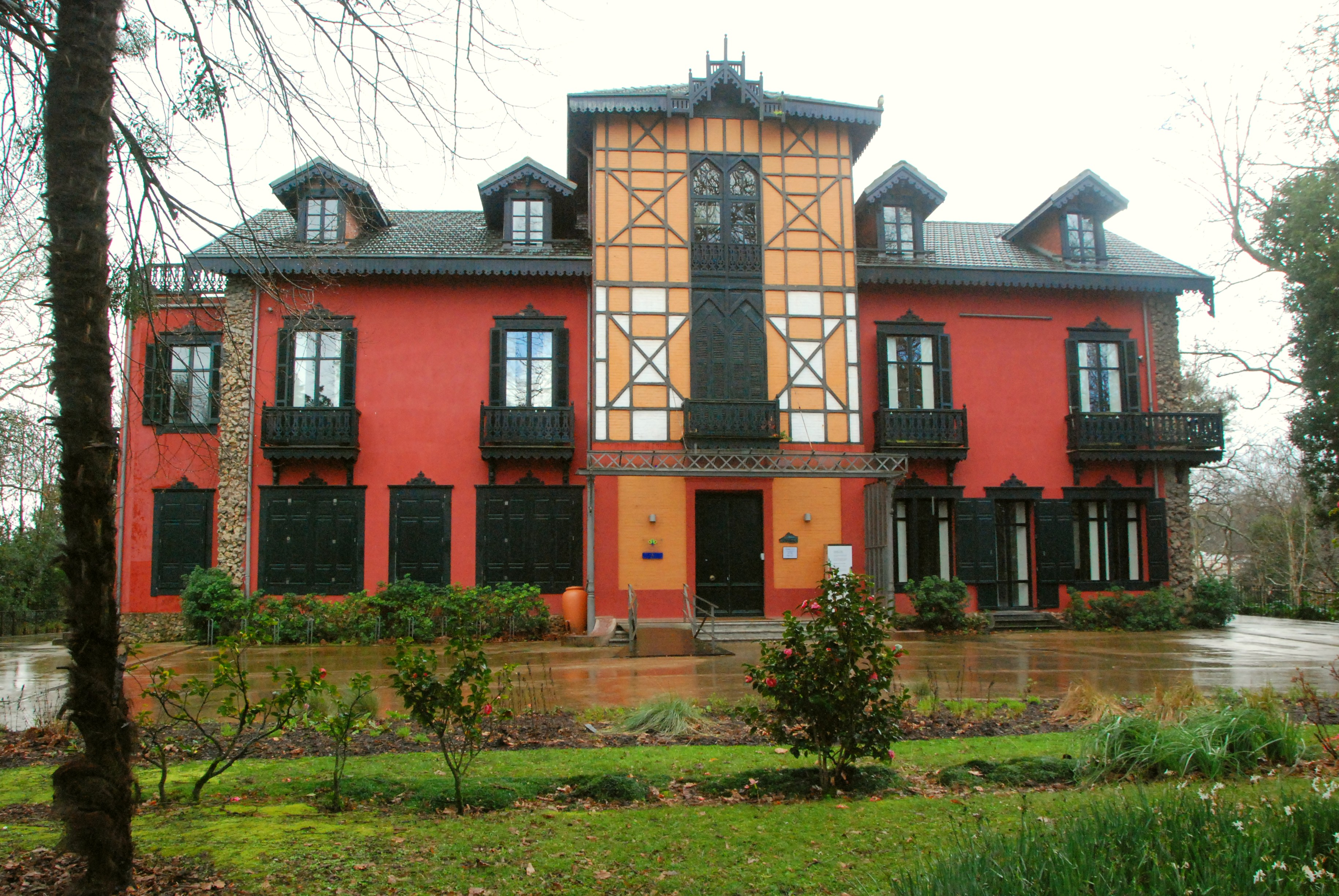
Cristina Enea, the summer house of the Dukes of Mandas in San Sebastián

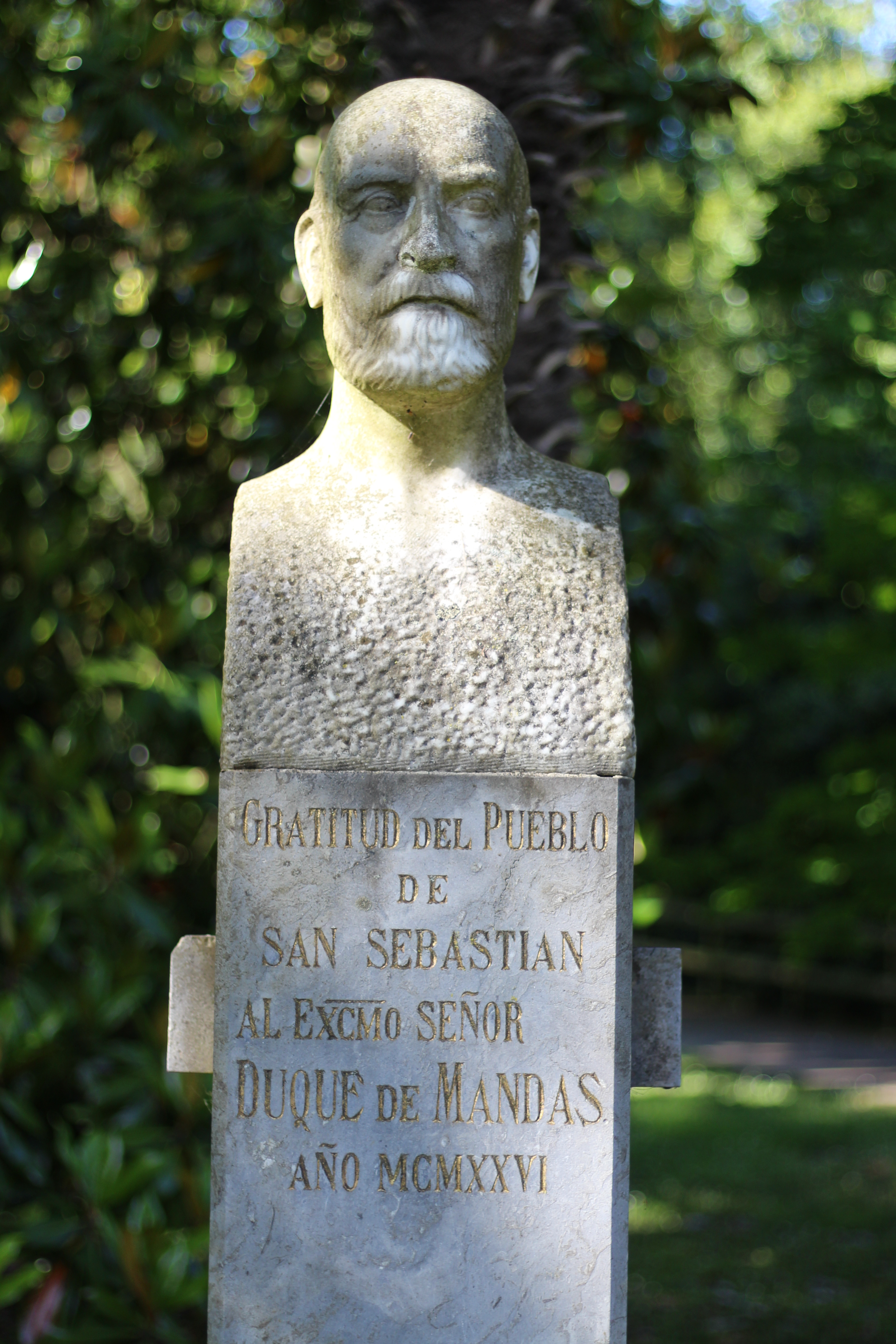
Bust of the 11th consort Duke of Mandas in Cristina Enea

== Dukes of Mandas y Villanueva ==
=== 1614 ===
- Pedro Maza de Lizana y Carroz, 1st Duke of Mandas (d. 1617)
- Juan Hurtado de Mendoza, 2nd Duke of Mandas (d. 1624), first cousin of the 1st Duke
- Ana de Mendoza, 3rd Duchess of Mandas (1598-1628), daughter of the 2nd Duke
- Alfonso López de Zúñiga Sotomayor y Mendoza, 4th Duke of Mandas (d. 1660), son of the 3rd Duchess
- Juan Manuel López de Zúñiga Sotomayor y Mendoza, 5th Duke of Mandas (1620-1660), brother of the 4th Duke
- Manuel Diego López de Zúñiga Sotomayor y Sarmiento, 6th Duke of Mandas (1657-1686), son of the 5th Duke
- Juan Manuel López de Zúñiga Sotomayor y Castro 7th Duke of Mandas (1680-1747), son of the 6th Duke
- Joaquín Diego López de Zúñiga Sotomayor y Castro, 8th Duke of Mandas (1715-1777), son of the 7th Duke
- María Josefa Pimentel y Téllez-Girón, 9th Duchess of Mandas (1750-1834), great-great-granddaughter of the 5th Duke
- Pedro de Alcántara Tellez-Giron y Beaufort-Spontin, 10th Duke of Mandas (1810-1844), grandson of the 9th Duchess

=== 1884 ===
- María Cristina Brunetti y Gayoso de los Cobos, 11th Duchess of Mandas (1831-1914), great-granddaughter of the 7th Duke
- María Rafaela Fernández de Henestrosa y Gayoso de los Cobos, 12th Duchess of Mandas (1882-1979), great-granddaughter of the 8th Duke
- Ignacio de la Huerta y Fernández de Henestrosa, 13th Duke of Mandas (1913-2001), son of the 12th Duchess
- Inigo de la Huerta y Ozores, 14th Duke of Mandas (b. 1944), son of the 13th Duke.

== See also ==
- List of dukes in the peerage of Spain
- List of current grandees of Spain
- Marquess of Terranova

== Bibliography ==
- Hidalgos de España, Real Asociación de (2018). Elenco de Grandezas y Títulos Nobiliarios Españoles. Ediciones Hidalguía. ISBN 978-84-94841-02-6.
