= Count of Villada =

Countship of Villada
- Creation date: 29 May 1625
- Created by: Philip IV
- Peerage: Peerage of Spain
- First holder: Enrique Pimentel y Enríquez, 1st Count of Villada
- Present holder: Luis Morenés y Sanchiz, 17th Count of Villada

Count of Villada (Spanish: Conde de Villada) is a hereditary title in the peerage of Spain, granted in 1625 by Philip IV to Enrique Pimentel, a Spanish statesman who was son of the 2nd Marquess of Távara.

== Count of Villada (1625) ==
- Enrique Pimentel y Enríquez, 1st Count of Villada
- Antonio Pimentel y Álvarez de Toledo, 2nd Count of Villada
- Enrique Enríquez de Pimentel y Osorio, 3rd Count of Villada
- Ana María Pimentel y Fernández de Córdoba, 4th Countess of Villada
- Teresa Pimentel y Fernández de Córdoba, 5th Countess of Villada
- Luisa Pimentel y Fernández de Córdoba, 6th Countess of Villada
- Ana María Pimentel y Fernández de Córdoba, 7th Countess of Villada
- Miguel Álvarez de Toledo y Pimentel, 8th Count of Villada
- Pedro de Alcántara Álvarez de Toledo y Silva, 9th Count of Villada
- Pedro de Alcántara Álvarez de Toledo y Salm-Salm, 10th Count of Villada
- Pedro de Alcántara Téllez-Girón y Beaufort Spontin, 11th Count of Villada
- Mariano Téllez-Girón y Beaufort Spontin, 12th Count of Villada
- Manuel Álvarez de Toledo y Lesparre, 13th Count of Villada
- María de las Mercedes de Arteaga y Echagüe, 14th Countess of Villada
- Luis Morenés y de Arteaga, 15th Count of Villada
- Luis Morenés y Areces, 16th Count of Villada
- Luis Morenés y Sanchiz, 17th Count of Villada

== See also ==
- Spanish nobility
