= Duke of Plasencia =

Dukedom of Spain

Dukedom of Plasencia
- Creation date: 1476
- Created by: Catholic Monarchs
- Peerage: Peerage of Spain
- First holder: Álvaro de Zúñiga y Guzmán, 1st Duke of Plasencia
- Present holder: María de Gracia Giacinta Ruspoli y Solís-Beaumont

Duke of Plasencia (Ducado de Plasencia) is a hereditary title in the Spanish nobility. It was granted on 1476 by Queen Isabella I and King Ferdinand V of Castile, The Catholic Monarchs, to Álvaro de Zúñiga y Guzmán, 2nd count of Plasencia and also 1st Duke of Béjar, 1st Duke of Arévalo and 1st Count of Bañares, in acknowledgment for his loyalty during the War of Castilian Succession.

The dukedom of Arévalo was forfeit, but those of Béjar and Plasencia where inherited by the descendants of the 1st duke and were held jointly until the 19th century. In 1777, the two titles were inherited by María Josefa Pimentel, 14th Countess Duchess of Benavente and Duchess Consort of Osuna, so the dukedoms left the House of Zúñiga to enter into that of Osuna. After the death of the 12th duke of Osuna, all his titles were distributed by royal warrants among his numerous nephews, as Queen Isabella II didn't want the main heir presumptive, the duke of Alba, to accumulate such an immense amount of lands and titles.

Then, the Dukedom of Plasencia was claimed and granted with grandeeship of Spain to María del Pilar Gayoso de los Cobos. The next three dukes died without issue, so the title was claimed in 1962 by Ángela María Téllez-Girón, 16th Duchess of Osuna, who ceded it in 1974 to her second daughter, María de Gracia de Solís-Beaumont, the former holder of the title, married to Carlo Emanuele Ruspoli, 3rd Duke of Morignano.

== Dukes of Plasencia (1476-) ==
- Álvaro de Zúñiga, 1st Duke of Béjar and Plasencia (c. 1410-1588).
- Álvaro de Zúñiga, 2nd Duke of Béjar and Plasencia (1455-1532), eldest son of the 1st duke's eldest son.
- Teresa de Zúñiga, 3rd Duchess of Béjar and Plasencia (c. 1500-1565), only daughter of the 2nd duke's brother.
- Francisco Diego de Zúñiga, 4th Duke of Béjar and Plasencia (c. 1530-1591), elder surviving son of the 3rd duchess.
- Francisco Diego de Zúñiga, 5th Duke of Béjar and Plasencia (c. 1560-1601), eldest son of the 4th duke.
- Alfonso Diego de Zúñiga, 6th Duke of Béjar and Plasencia (c. 1580-1620), second son of the 5th duke.
- Francisco Diego de Zúñiga, 6th Duke of Béjar and Plasencia (c. 1596-1636), only son of the 6th duke.
- Alfonso de Zúñiga, 8th Duke of Béjar and Plasencia (c. 1615-1660), eldest son of the 7th duke.
- Juan Manuel de Zúñiga, 9th Duke of Béjar and Plasencia (c. 1620-1660), second son of the 7th duke.
- Manuel Diego de Zúñiga, 10th Duke of Béjar and Plasencia (1657-1668), eldest son of the 9th duke.
- Juan Manuel de Zúñiga, 11th Duke of Béjar and Plasencia (1680-1747), eldest son of the 10th duke.
- Joaquín de Zúñiga, 12th Duke of Béjar and Plasencia (1715-1771), eldest son of the 11th duke.
- María Josefa Pimentel, 12th Countess Duchess of Benavente and 13th Duchess of Bejar and Plasencia (1750-1834), great-granddaughter of the 10th duke's only sister.
- Pedro de Alcántara Téllez-Girón, 11th Duke of Osuna and 14th Duke of Bejar and Plasencia (1810-1844), eldest son of the 13th duchess' eldest surviving son.
- Mariano Téllez-Girón, 12th Duke of Osuna and 15th Duke of Bejar and Plasencia (1814-1882), second son of the 13th duchess' eldest surviving son.
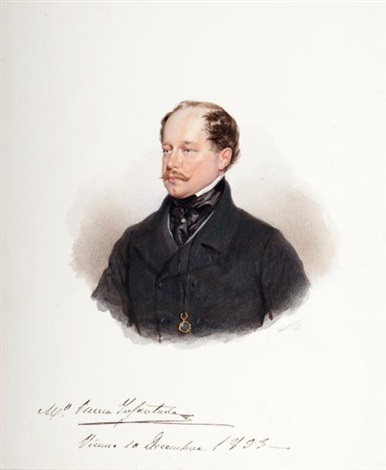
  The 15th Duke of Plasencia by Kriehuber, 1853
- María del Pilar Gayoso de los Cobos, 16th Duchess of Plasencia (1856-1939), granddaughter of the 13th duchess' seventh daughter.
- Ignacio Fernández de Henestrosa, 17th Duke of Plasencia (1880-1948), elder son of the 16th duchess' eldest sister.
- José María Martorell, 18th Duke of Plasencia (1903-1960), great-grandson of the 14th duke's second brother.
- Ángela María Téllez-Girón, 16th Duchess of Osuna and 19th Duchess of Plasencia (1925-2015), great-granddaughter of the 14th duke's second brother.
- María de Gracia de Solís-Beaumont, 20th Duchess of Plasencia (1957-2021), second daughter of the 19th duchess.
- María de Gracia Giacinta Ruspoli y Solís-Beaumont, 21st Duchess of Plasencia and 16th Marchioness of the Villar de Grajanejos (b. 1977), married with Javier Isidro González de Gregorio y Molina, of the Counts of la Puebla de Valverde's family (and member of the Casa de Zúñiga through the Counts of Nieva), who have two daughters, María de Gracia (b. 2015) and Blanca Micaela (b. 2018) González de Gregorio y Ruspoli.

== Family tree ==
Álvaro de Zúñiga, 1st Duke of Béjar and Plasencia c. 1410–1588
Álvaro de Zúñiga, 2nd Duke of Béjar and Plasencia; 1455–1532	Francisco de Zúñiga, 1st Marquis of Ayamonte d. 1525
Teresa de Zúñiga, 3rd Duchess of Béjar and Plasencia; 1500-1565
Francisco Diego de Zúñiga, 4th Duke of Béjar and Plasencia; 1530-1591
Francisco Diego de Zúñiga, 5th Duke of Béjar and Plasencia; 1560-1601
Alfonso Diego de Zúñiga, 6th Duke of Béjar and Plasencia; 1580-1620
Francisco Diego de Zúñiga, 7th Duke of Béjar and Plasencia; 1596-1636
Alfonso de Zúñiga, 8th Duke of Béjar and Plasencia; 1615-1660	Juan Manuel de Zúñiga, 9th Duke of Béjar and Plasencia; 1620-1660
Manuel Diego de Zúñiga, 10th Duke of Béjar and Plasencia; 1657-1668	Manuela de Zúñiga, Countess Duchess of Benavente d. 1712
Juan Manuel de Zúñiga, 11th Duke of Béjar and Plasencia; 1680-1747	Alfonso Francisco Pimentel, 10th Count Duke of Benavente d. 1743
Joaquín de Zúñiga, 12th Duke of Béjar and Plasencia; 1715-1771	Francisco Pimentel, 11th Count Duke of Benavente; 1707-1763
María Josefa Pimentel, Duchess of Osuna, 12th Countess Duchess of Benavente, 13th Duchess of Béjar and Plasencia; 1750-1834
Josefa Manuela Téllez-Girón, Marquise of Camarasa; 1783–1817	Francisco de Borja Téllez-Girón, 10th Duke of Osuna; 1785-1820	Pedro de Alcántara Téllez-Girón, 2nd Prince of Anglona; 1786–1851
Jacobo María Gayoso de los Cobos, 14th Marquis of Camarasa; 1816-1871	Pedro de Alcántara Téllez-Girón, 11th Duke of Osuna, 14th Duke of Béjar and Plasencia; 1810-1844	Mariano Téllez-Girón, 12th Duke of Osuna, 15th Duke of Béjar and Plasencia; 1814-1882	Tirso Téllez-Girón, Duke of Uceda; 1817–1871
Francisco de Borja Gayoso de los Cobos, 15th Marquis of Camarasa; 1854–1926	María del Pilar Gayoso de los Cobos, 16th Duchess of Plasencia; 1856-1939	Francisco de Borja Téllez-Girón, 15th Duke of Escalona; 1839–1897
Ignacio Gayoso de los Cobos, 17th Duke of Plasencia; 1880-1948	Angela María Téllez-Girón, Duchess of Almenara Alta; 1879-1921	Mariano Téllez-Girón, 15th Duke of Osuna; 1887–1925
José María Martorell, 18th Duke of Plasencia; 1903-1960	Ángela María Téllez-Girón, 16th Duchess of Osuna, 19th Duchess of Plasencia; 1925-2015
María de Gracia de Solís-Beaumont, 20th Duchess of Plasencia; 1957-2021
María de Gracia Ruspoli, 16th Marquise of the Villar de Grajanejos b. 1977

== See also ==
- Count of Plasencia
