= Duke of Béjar =

Dukedom of Spain

Dukedom of Béjar
- Creation date: 1485
- Created by: Catholic Monarchs
- Peerage: Peerage of Spain
- First holder: Álvaro de Zúñiga y Guzmán, 1st Duke of Béjar
- Present holder: Pedro de Alcántara Roca de Togores y Salinas, 21st Duke of Béjar

Duke of Béjar (Spanish: Duque de Béjar) is a hereditary title in the Peerage of Spain, accompanied by the dignity of Grandee and granted in 1485 by the Catholic Monarchs to Álvaro de Zúñiga, 1st Duke of Plasencia and chief justice of Castile.

The title refers to the town of Béjar in Salamanca, Spain.

== Dukes of Béjar (1485) ==
- Álvaro de Zúñiga y Guzmán, 1st Duke of Béjar (1485–1488)
- Álvaro de Zúñiga y Pérez de Guzmán, 2nd Duke of Béjar (1488–1532)
- Teresa de Zúñiga y Manrique de Lara, 3rd Duchess of Béjar (1532–1565)
- Francisco de Zúñiga y Sotomayor, 4th Duke of Béjar (1565–1591)
- Francisco Diego de Zúñiga y Mendoza, 5th Duke of Béjar (1591–1601)
- Alfonso Diego de Zúñiga y Pérez de Guzmán, 6th Duke of Béjar (1601–1619)
- Francisco Diego de Zúñiga y Mendoza, 7th Duke of Béjar (1619–1636)
- Alfonso Diego de Zúñiga y Mendoza, 8th Duke of Béjar (1636–1660)
- Juan Manuel de Zúñiga y Mendoza, 9th Duke of Béjar (1660–1664)
- Manuel Diego López de Zúñiga y Sarmiento de Silva, 10th Duke of Béjar (1664–1686)
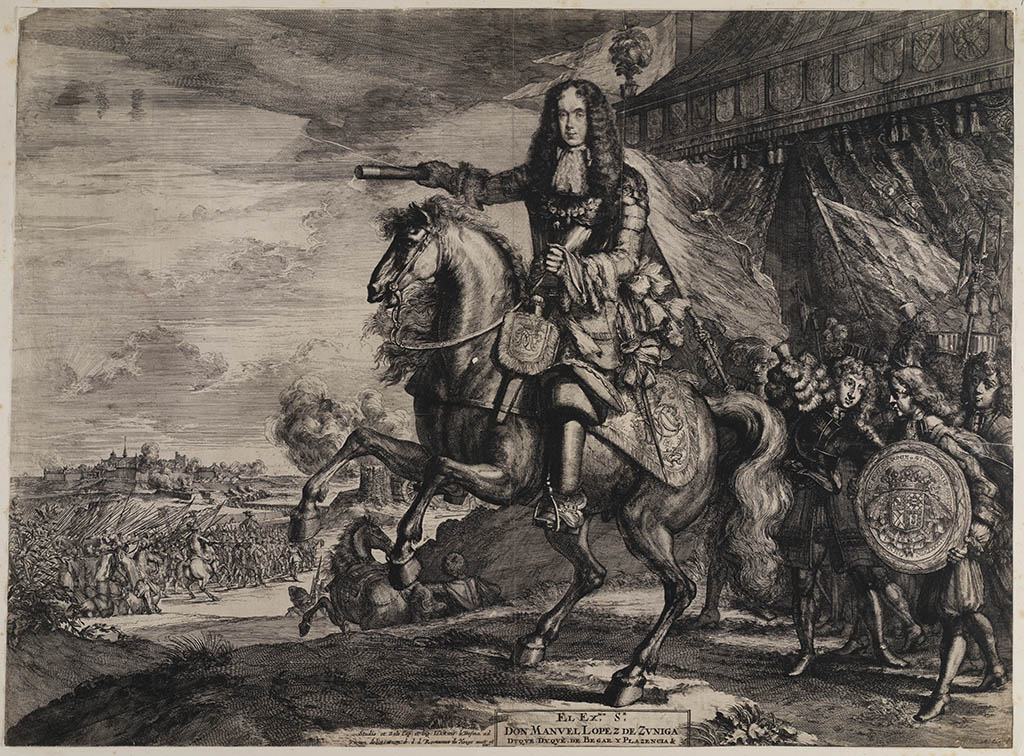
  The 10th Duke of Béjar by Romeyn de Hooghe, 1682
- Juan Manuel López de Zúñiga y Castro, 11th Duke of Béjar, 11th Duke of Béjar (1686–1747)
- Joaquín López de Zúñiga y Castro, 12th Duke of Béjar (1747–1777)
- María Josefa Alfonso-Pimentel y Téllez-Girón, 13th Duchess of Béjar (1777–1834)
- Pedro de Alcántara Téllez-Girón y Beaufort Spontin, 14th Duke of Béjar (1834–1844)
- Mariano Téllez-Girón y Beaufort Spontin, 15th Duke of Béjar (1844–1882)
- María del Rosario Téllez-Girón y Fernández de Velasco, 16th Duchess of Béjar (1882–1896)
- Jaime Roca de Togores y Téllez-Girón, 17th duke of Béjar (1896–1921)
- Luis de Alcántara Roca de Togores y Téllez-Girón, 18th Duke of Béjar (1921–1936)
- Pedro de Álcantara Roca de Togores y Tordesillas, 19th Duke of Béjar (1936–1941)
- Pedro de Álcantara Roca de Togores y Laffitte, 20th Duke of Béjar (1941–1978)
- Pedro de Álcantara Roca de Togores y Salinas, 21st Duke of Béjar (1979-)

== See also ==
- List of dukes in the peerage of Spain
- List of current grandees of Spain
