= Marquisate of Lombay =

Hereditary title in the Peerage of Spain

- Creation date: 1530
- Created by: Charles V of Spain
- Peerage: Spain
- First holder: Francis Borgia, 4th Duke of Gandía
- Present holder: Ángela María de Solís-Beaumont y Téllez-Giron

Marquess of Lombay is a noble title created by King Charles V of Spain in favor of Saint Francis Borgia Grandee of Spain, Duke of Gandia. on 7 July 1530.

== Marquesses of Lombay ==
- Saint Saint Francis Borgia (1510 - 1572), Duke of Gandia, 1st Marquess of Lombay.
- Carlos de Borja y Castro (1530 - 1592), 2nd Marquis of Lombay, 5th Duke of Gandía, Viceroy and Captain-general of Portugal. In 1548 married Magdalena de Centellas y Folch de Cardona.
- Francisco Tomás de Borja y Centellas (1551 – 1595), son of the above, 3rd Marquis of Lombay, 6th Duke of Gandía and other titles. Married on 19 January 1572 Juana de Velasco y Aragón (d. 1626).
- Carlos Francisco de Borja Centellas y Velasco (1573 – 1632), son of the above, 4th Marquis of Lombay, 7th Duke of Gandía and other titles. Married in 1593 Artemisa Doria y Carreta, daughter of Juan Andrea Doria, Prince of Melfi and Cenobia Carreto.
- Francisco Diego Pascual de Borja Centellas Doria y Carreto (1596 – 1664), only son of the above, 5th Marquis of Lombay, 8th Duke of Gandía, married Artemisa María Ana Teresa Gertrudis Doria y Colonna (c. 1604 – c. 1654).
- Francisco Carlos Pascual Borja y Centellas Doria y Colonna (1626 – 1665), son of the above, 6th Marquis of Lombay, 9th Duke of Gandía and other titles. Married in Madrid on 21 October 1645 María Ana Ponce de León (d. 1676), daughter of Rodrigo Ponce de León, 4th Duke of Arcos.
- Pascual Francisco de Borja y Centellas Ponce de León (1653 – 1716), son of the above, 7th Marquis of Lombay, 10th Duke of Gandía. In 1669 married Juana Fernández de Córdoba-Figueroa y de la Cerda (d. 1720), daughter of the 7th Marquis of Priego.
- Luis Ignacio de Borja y Centellas Fernández de Córdoba (1673 – 1740), 9th Marquis of Lombay, 8th Count of Mayalde, 11th Duke of Gandía. Married Rosalea Rafaela Benavides y Aragón, without issue. Pascual Francisco was the last legitimate male, direct-line descendant in Spain of the first title-holder, Saint Francis Borgia. (Note: A direct male line exists in Ecuador and other parts of South America, descendants of Fernando de Borja, also son of Saint Francis Borgia, who had a son out of wedlock, Juan de Borja, who was legitimized by King Philip III of Spain on 14 January 1604.)
- María Ana Antonia de Borja y Centellas Fernández de Córdoba (1676 – 1748), sister of the above, 10th Marchioness of Lombay, 9th Countess of Mayalde. Married as her first husband Luis de Benavides y Aragón, Viceroy of Navarre and as her second husband Juan Manuel, 11th Duke of Béjar. She was succeeded by her nephew in accordance to letter issued in 10 March 1756 pursuant the royal sentence and of the Supreme Council of Castile of 28 July 1755.
- Francisco de Borja Alonso-Pimentel Vigil de Quiñones de Borja y Centellas, nephew of the above, 11th Marquis of Lombay, 13th Duke of Gandia, 10th Count of Mayalde, Duke of Benavente and other titles. Married as his second wife Faustina Téllez-Girón Pérez de Guzmán, daughter of the 7th Duke of Osuna.
- María Josefa Alonso-Pimentel y Téllez-Girón, daughter of the above, 12th Marchioness of Lombay, 11th Countess of Mayalde, 15th Countess-12th Duchess of Benavente. Married her first cousin Pedro Téllez-Girón, 9th Duke of Osuna. Succeeded by her grandson.
- 12th
- 13th
- 14th
- 15th
- 16th
- 17th
- 18th
- 19th
- 20th
- María Dolores Téllez-Girón de Dominé (born 1859), 21st Marchioness of Lombay, 18th Duchess of Gandía, 11th Marchioness of Javalquinto, 19th Countess-20th Duchess of Benavente. Married to Emilio Bessieres y Ramírez de Arellano. Without issue.
- 22nd
- Ángela María Téllez-Girón y Duque de Estrada, 23rd Marchioness of Lombay, 19th Duchess of Gandía, 12th Marchioness of Javalquinto, Countess-Duchess of Benavente.
- Ángela María de Solís-Beaumont y Téllez-Giron, daughter of the above, 24th Marchioness of Lombay as per Carta de Sucesión ("Letter of Succession") dated 30 March 2016 after the death of her mother, the former title-holder.

== Bibliography ==
- Batllori, Miguel (1999). La familia de los Borjas (in Spanish). Madrid: Real Academia de la Historia. ISBN 84-89512-34-5.
- Salazar y Acha, Jaime de (2010). "Una rama subsistente del linaje de Borja en la América española" (PDF). Boletín de la Real Academia Matritense de Heráldica y Genealogía (in Spanish). No. 75. pp. 16–17. OCLC 27332380. Archived from the original (PDF) on 2012-04-12.
- Soler Salcedo, Juan Miguel (2008). Nobleza Española. Grandeza Inmemorial 1520 (in Spanish). Madrid: Visión Libros. ISBN 978-84-9886-179-2.
- Williams, George L. (1998). Papal Genealogy: The Families and Descendants of the Popes. Jefferson, North Carolina: McFarland & Co. ISBN 0-7864-2071-5.
