= Count of Mayalde =

County of Mayalde.
- Creation date: 1596
- Created by: Philip II of Spain
- Peerage: Spain
- First holder: Juan de Borja y Castro

Count of Mayalde is a noble title created in 1596 by King Philip II of Spain (House of Habsburg) for Juan de Borja y Castro son of Saint Francis Borgia, 1st Marquis of Lombay.

== Counts of Mayalde ==
=== House of Borgia ===
- Juan de Borja y Castro (1533–1606), 2nd Marquis of Lombay, 1st Count of Mayalde, 1st Count of Ficalho jointly with his wife, in 1599. Married as his second wife Francisca de Aragón y Barreto.
- Francisco de Borja y Aragón (1581–1658), son of the above, 2nd Count of Mayalde, Count of Ficalho, Count of Rebolledo, Viceroy of Peru, writer. Married his cousin Ana de Borja y Pignatelli (d. 1644), 5th Princess of Squillace.
- Fernando de Borja y Aragón, (1583–1655), brother of the above, 3rd Count of Mayalde, Viceroy of Aragón and of Valencia. Married in 1623 his niece (the daughter of his older brother, Francisco) María Francisca de Borja (d. 1649), 6th Princess of Squillace.
- Francisca de Borja y Aragón (d. 1693), daughter of the above, 4th Countess of Mayalde, 7th Princess of Squillace. Married twice: firstly in 1650 to Manuel de Aragón y Gurrea y Borja (d. 1653), without issue. Married again in 1654 Francisco Idiáquez-Butrón y Álava (d. 1687).
- Francisco Idiáquez Butrón Borja de Aragón, son of the above, 5th Count of Mayalde, 8th Prince of Squillace, 4th Duke of Ciudad Real and other titles. Married Francisca Niño de Guevara, without issue.
- Juana María Idiáquez Butrón (d. 1712), sister of the above, 6th Countess of Mayalde, 9th Princess of Squillace, and other titles. Married, as her first husband on 21 March 1685, Antonio Pimentel de Ibarra, 4th Marquis of Taracena.
- María Antonia Pimentel Idiáquez Butrón y Mújica Ibarra y Borja (1686–1728), daughter of the above, 7th Countess of Mayalde, 10th Princess of Squillace, and other titles. Married twice with no issue from either marriage.
- 8th
- Pascual de Borja y Centellas, 9th Count of Mayalde.
- María Ignacia de Borja y Centellas (1677–1711), 10th Count of Mayalde, daughter of Pascual de Borja y Centellas, married to Antonio Francisco Alonso-Pimentel Vigil de Quiñones y Zúñiga (d. 1743), 15th Count of Mayorga, 6th Marquis of Javalquinto, and other titles.
- Francisco Alonso-Pimentel Vigil de Quiñones y Borja (1703–1763), son of the above, 11th Count of Mayalde, 17th Count of Mayorga, 15th Count of Luna, 14th Count of Alba de Liste and other titles.

=== Title rehabilitated ===
In 1904, under King Alfonso XIII of Spain, the title of count of Mayalde was rehabilitated by:

- José Finat y Carvajal, 16th Count of Mayalde, 2nd Count of Finat and 11th Count of Villaflor, Marquis of Terranova, married to María Escrivá de Romaní y de la Quintana.
- José Finat y Escrivá de Romaní (1904–1995), son of the above, 17th Count of Mayalde since 19 September 1919, 3rd Count of Finat since 1956, 15th Count of Villaflor, 12th Marquis of Terranova, politician and government official at service of Francoist Spain, Mayor of Madrid. On 27 June 1919, married Castida Bustos y Figueroa (born 1910).
- José María de la Blanca Finat y Bustos (born 25 February 1932), son of the above, 18th Count of Mayalde, 14th Viscount of Rías, 11th Marquis of Corvera, and other titles. Married Aline Riva de Luna.
- Rafael Ángel Finat y Riva, 19th Count of Mayalde on 12 July 1996, married to Ana Martínez-Costa Risso.

== Bibliography ==
- Batllori, Miguel (1999). La familia de los Borjas (in Spanish). Madrid: Real Academia de la Historia. ISBN 84-89512-34-5.
- Cuiñas Gómez, Macarena (18 May 2009). "Don Francisco de Borja y Aragón, Príncipe de Esquilache". Cervantes Virtual (in Spanish). Instituto Cervantes.
- Soler Salcedo, Juan Miguel (2008). Nobleza Española. Grandeza Inmemorial 1520 (in Spanish). Madrid: Visión Libros. ISBN 978-84-9886-179-2.
- Williams, George L. (1998). Papal Genealogy: The Families and Descendants of the Popes. Jefferson, North Carolina: McFarland & Co. ISBN 0-7864-2071-5.
