= Francisco Téllez-Girón, 10th Duke of Osuna =

Spanish nobleman

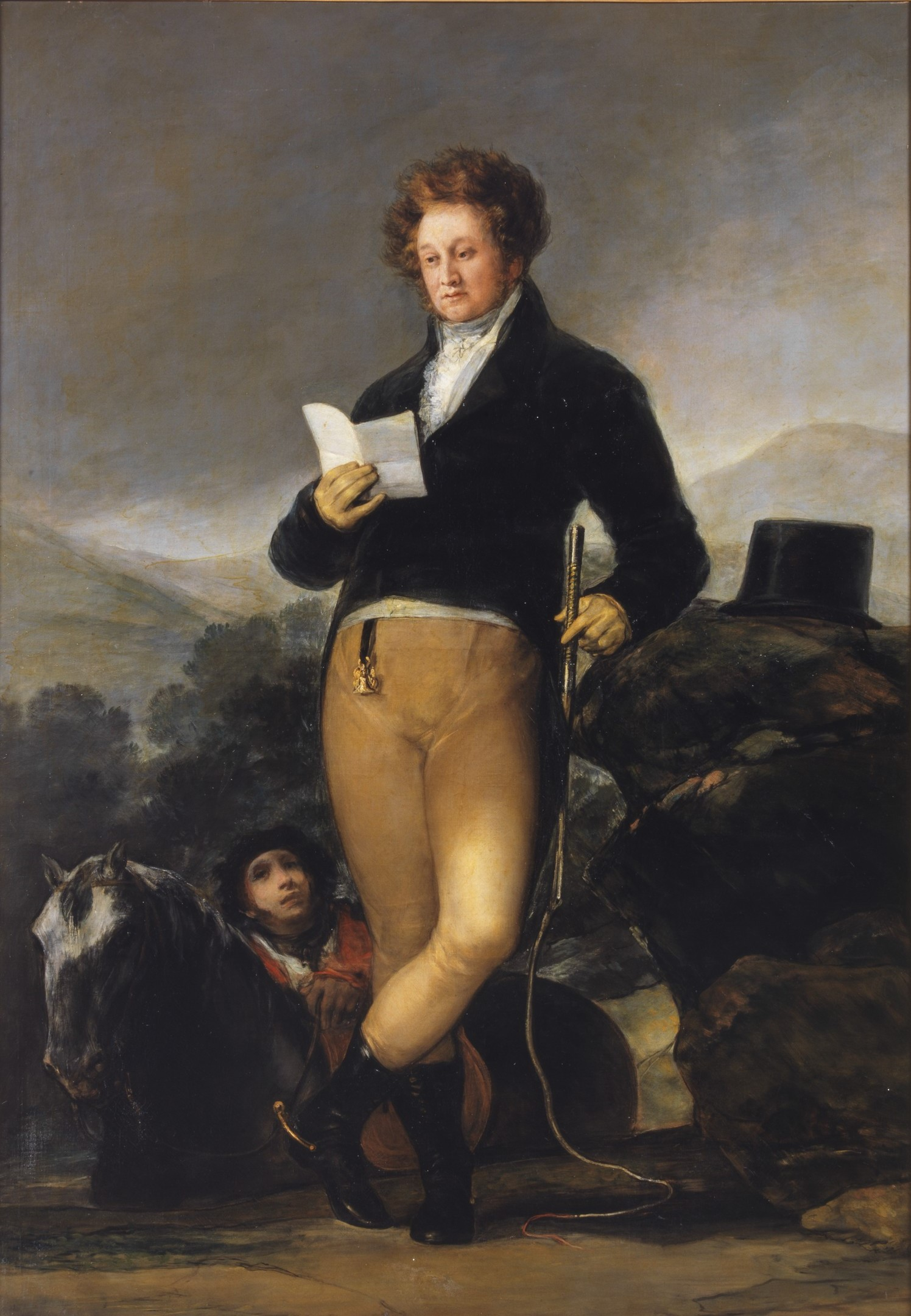
- Don Francisco de Borja Tellez Giron, by Francisco de Goya, Musée Bonnat
- Born: 6 October 1785
- Died: 21 May 1820 (aged 34)
- Noble family: House of Osuna
- Spouse: Marie-Françoise-Philippine Beaufort-Spontin
- Issue: Pedro de Alcántara Téllez-Girón y Beaufort Spontin, 14th Duke of the Infantado
- Father: Pedro Téllez-Girón, 9th Duke of Osuna
- Mother: María Josefa Pimentel, Duchess of Osuna

Francisco de Borja Téllez-Girón y Pimentel, 10th Duke de Osuna (6 October 1785 – 21 May 1820), Grandee of Spain, was a Spanish nobleman.

Francisco Téllez-Girón was the 7th son of Pedro Téllez-Girón, 9th Duke of Osuna (1756–1807). In 1802, he married Countess Marie Françoise Philippine Beaufort-Spontin (1785–1830), daughter of Frederic Augustus Alexander, Duke of Beaufort-Spontin and his wife Leopoldina Álvarez de Toledo (1760–1792), who in turn was the daughter of Pedro de Alcántara Álvarez de Toledo y Silva, 12th Duke of the Infantado.

Their son, the 11th Duke, Pedro de Álcantara was born in 1810, but died in 1844 without issue.

== Sources ==
- Hobbs, Nicolas (2007). "Grandes de España" (in Spanish).
- Instituto de Salazar y Castro. Elenco de Grandezas y Titulos Nobiliarios Españoles (in Spanish). periodic publication.

Spanish nobility
Preceded by Pedro Téllez-Girón	Duke of Osuna; 1807–1820	Succeeded by Pedro Téllez-Girón
