= Frederic Augustus Alexander, Duke of Beaufort-Spontin =

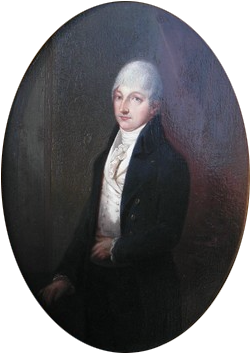
Frederic, 1st Duke of Beaufort-Spontin

Frédéric Auguste Alexandre de Beaufort-Spontin, 1st Duke of Beaufort-Spontin (Note: French: Frédéric Auguste Alexandre duc de Beaufort-Spontin) (Namur, 14 September 1751 – Brussels, April 1817), was a member of the House of Beaufort-Spontin, a Belgian noble family that opposed Napoleon I of France.

== Biography ==
Beaufort was, by letters patent of the Holy Roman Emperor Joseph II, dated 2 December 1782, count of the Holy Roman Empire, Marquis of Florennes, etc. and a privy councillor and chamberlain of Archduke Karl of Austria in Brussels.

Beaufort was Governor-General of the Austrian Netherlands on behalf of the Sixth Coalition Powers in 1814, and President of the Privy Council, chamberlain, and grand marshal of the court of King William I of the Netherlands. He was also a member of the First Chamber of the States General and Commander of the Order of the Netherlands Lion.
