= Haro (surname) =

Haro is the family name of:

- House of Haro, a family of Spanish nobility
  - Alonso Núñez de Haro y Peralta (1729–1800), Archbishop of Mexico and Viceroy of New Spain
  - Diego López de Haro (disambiguation)
  - Fernando Díaz de Haro (Lord of Orduña and Balmaseda) (14th century)
  - Fernando Ramírez de Haro, 16th Count of Bornos (born 1949)
  - Fernando Ramírez de Haro, 10th Marquis of Villanueva del Duero (born 1976)
  - Francisco de Haro (1792–1849), first alcalde (mayor) of Yerba Buena (later named San Francisco, California)
  - Gaspar Méndez de Haro, 7th Marquis of Carpio (1629–1687), Spanish political figure and art collector
  - Gonzalo López de Haro (before 1788–1823), Spanish explorer
  - Ignacio Ramírez de Haro, 15th Count of Bornos (1918–2010)
  - Juan de Castilla y Haro (died 1326)
  - Juan Damián López de Haro (1581–1648), Bishop of Puerto Rico
  - Juan de Dios de Silva y Mendoza y Haro, 10th Duke of the Infantado (1672–1737)
  - Juan Domingo de Zuñiga y Fonseca (1640–1716), Spanish military and political figure
  - Lope Díaz de Haro (disambiguation)
  - Luis Méndez de Haro (1598–1661), Spanish politician and general
  - María Díaz de Haro (disambiguation)
  - Mécia Lopes de Haro (c. 1217–1270), Queen consort of Portugal
  - Teresa Díaz de Haro, daughter of Diego López II de Haro, lady of Biscay
  - Teresa Díaz II de Haro (born before 1254)
  - Urraca López de Haro (c. 1160-c. 1230), Queen consort of León
- Antonio Haro (1910–2002), Mexican fencer
- Bob Haro (born 1958), former freestyle BMX rider, artist and business executive, founder of Haro Bikes
- Christopher de Haro, Lisbon-based merchant of Flemish origin who financially backed Magellan's 1519 circumnavigation of the world
- David García Haro (born 1980), Spanish footballer
- Eduardo Haro Tecglen (1924–2005), Spanish journalist, writer and theatre critic
- Guillermo Haro (1913–1988), Mexican astronomer
- Klaus Härö (born 1971), Finland-Swedish film director
- Lauri Härö (1899–1980), Finnish sprinter
- Manuel Gaspar Haro (born 1981), Spanish footballer
- Mariano Haro (born 1940), Spanish former long-distance runner
- Melissa Haro (born 1987), American model
- Miguel Nazar Haro (c. 1924–2012), head of Mexico's Dirección Federal de Seguridad (Federal Security Directorate) from 1978 to 1989
- Claudia Haro (born ?), American actress convicted of attempted murder on her ex-husband
