= Diego López =

Diego López may refer to:

== Academics ==
- Diego López de Zúñiga (theologian) (died 1531), Spanish Biblical scholar
- Diego López de Cogolludo, Spanish Franciscan historian of Yucatán

== Artists and entertainers ==
- Diego López (painter) (c. 1465–1530), Spanish Renaissance painter
- Diego López Rivera (born 1952), Mexican filmmaker

== Politicians ==
- Diego López de Pacheco, 2nd Duke of Escalona (1456–1529), Spanish nobleman
- Diego López de Zúñiga, 4th Count of Nieva (c. 1510–1564), viceroy of Peru, 1561–1564
- Diego López Pacheco, 7th Duke of Escalona (1599–1653), Spanish nobleman
- Diego López Garrido (born 1947), Spanish politician

== Sportspeople ==
=== Association football ===
- Diego López (footballer, born March 1974) (Diego Miguel López Santos), Spanish former midfielder
- Diego López (footballer, born August 1974) (Luis Diego López Breijo), Uruguayan former defender and manager of Universidad de Chile
- Diego López (Argentine footballer, born 1981) (Diego Martín López), former midfielder
- Diego López (Spanish footballer, born 1981) (Diego López Rodríguez), goalkeeper for Rayo Vallecano
- Diego López (footballer, born 1983) (Diego López Aguilar), Mexican former defender and manager of Chihuahua
- Diego López (footballer, born 1992) (Diego Fores López), Argentine defender for Estudiantes BA
- Diego López (footballer, born 1994) (Diego Gastón López Barrios), Uruguayan midfielder for Llacuabamba
- Diego López (footballer, born 1995) (Diego Eduardo López), Paraguayan midfielder
- Diego López (footballer, born 1996) (Diego Ignacio López), Argentine midfielder for Sportivo Las Parejas
- Diego López (footballer, born 1999) (Diego López Reyes), Uruguayan defender for Sud América
- Diego López (footballer, born May 2002) (Diego López Noguerol), Spanish forward for Valencia
- Diego Lopes (footballer) (Diego Hipólito da Silva Lopes), Brazilian midfielder, born 1994, for Chinese Super League club Qingdao Hainiu
- Diego Jiménez (footballer, born 1991) (Diego Jiménez López), Spanish defender

=== Other sports ===
- Diego Lopes (fighter) (born 1994), Brazilian MMA featherweight for the Ultimate Fighting Championship
- Diego López (cyclist), Spanish cyclist
- Diego López Díaz (born 1994), Mexican Paralympic swimmer

== See also ==
- Diego López de Haro (disambiguation)
