= Susticacán =

- Municipality
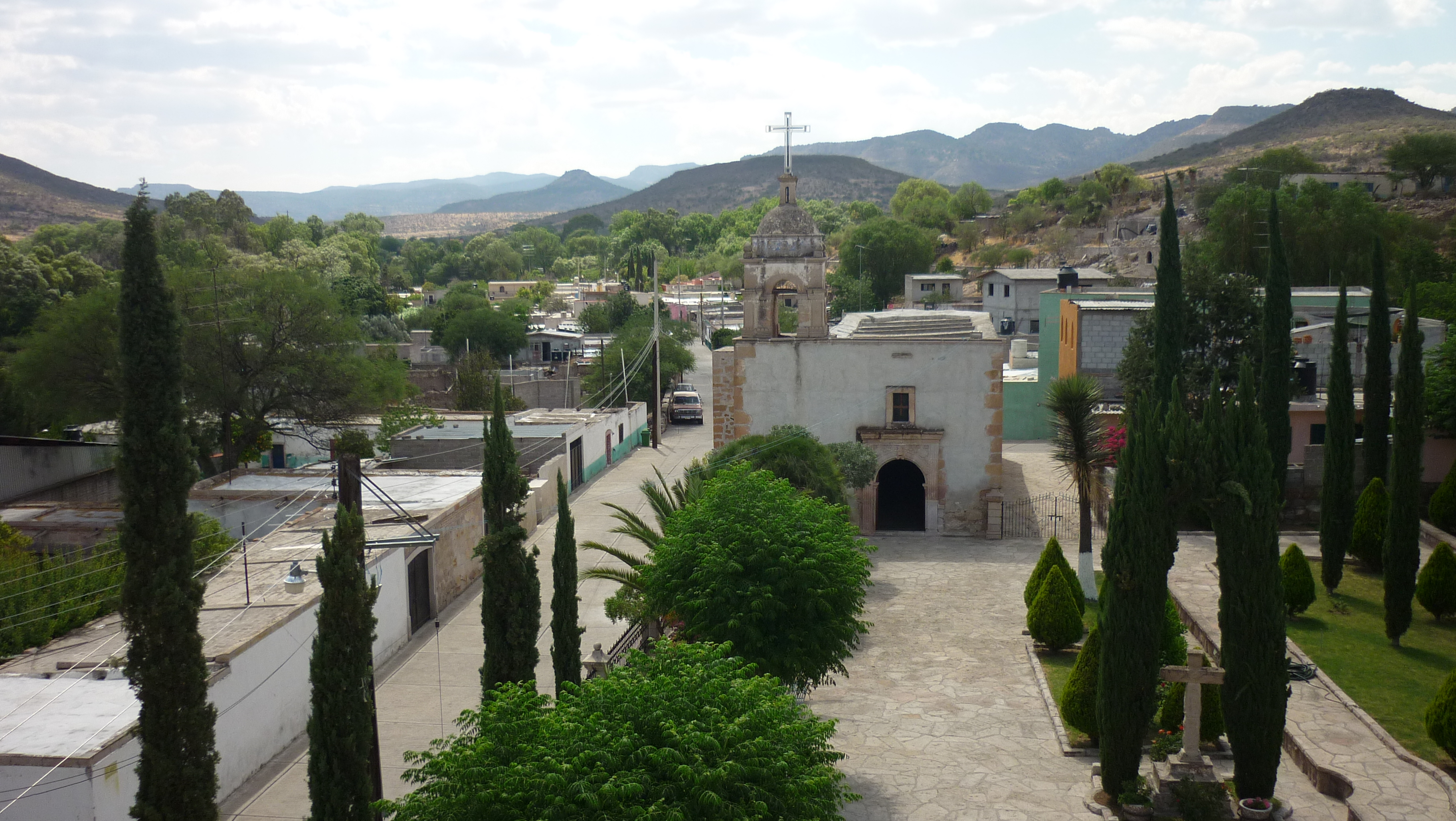
- The Capilla de San Pedro in Susticacán

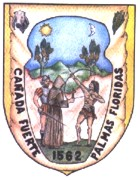
- Coat of arms

- Location of Susticacán Susticacán (Mexico)
- Coordinates: 22°36′35″N 103°05′51″W
- Country: Mexico
- State: Zacatecas
- Established: 29 October 1833
- Seat: Susticacán

Government
  - Municipal president: Fabiola Rodríguez Saldívar

Area
  - Total: 199.6 km^{2} (77.1 sq mi)
- Elevation (of seat): 2,043 m (6,703 ft)

Population (2020 Census)
  - Total: 1,365
  - Density: 6.839/km^{2} (17.71/sq mi)
  - Seat: 929
- Time zone: UTC-6 (Central)
- Postal code: 99480
- Area code: 494

Susticacán (from Purépecha Etsosticacán, derived from et, "gully"; sost, "strong"; and can, "place") is a municipality in the Mexican state of Zacatecas, located approximately 55 kilometres (34 mi) west of Zacatecas City, the state capital.

== Geography ==
The municipality of Susticacán lies at an elevation between 2,000 and 3,000 metres (6,600–9,800 ft) in the Sierra de los Cardos in west-central Zacatecas. It borders the municipalities of Jerez to the northwest, Tepetongo to the south, Monte Escobedo to the southwest, and Valparaíso to the northwest. The municipality covers an area of 199.6 square kilometres (77.1 sq mi) and comprises 0.3% of the state's area.

The land cover in Susticacán comprises temperate forest (58%), grassland (20%), tropical forest (16%), agricultural land (4%), and built-up areas (1%).

=== Hydrography ===
The municipality lies in the basin of the Bolaños River in the Río Grande de Santiago system. It is drained by seasonal streams, the most important of these being the Susticacán which flows east into the Jerez River, and the Chiquihuite which flows south into the Huejúcar River. The Jerez and Huejúcar rivers combine at Las Liebres in Jalisco to form the Colotlán River. The municipality's largest reservoir is the Susticacán Reservoir on the Susticacán River, which has a total capacity of 4,500,000 cubic metres (160,000,000 cu ft).

=== Climate ===
Susticacán's climate ranges from temperate in the higher elevations of the west to semiarid in the east, with dry winters. Average temperatures in the municipality range between 12 and 18 °C (54–64 °F), and average annual precipitation ranges between 500 and 800 millimetres (20–31 in).

Climate data for Susticacán Reservoir weather station at 22°36′35″N 103°05′51″W, 2030 m above sea level (1981–2010 averages, 1951–2010 extremes)
Month	Jan	Feb	Mar	Apr	May	Jun	Jul	Aug	Sep	Oct	Nov	Dec	Year
Record high °C (°F)	29.5 (85.1)	31.0 (87.8)	32.0 (89.6)	36.0 (96.8)	41.0 (105.8)	38.0 (100.4)	37.0 (98.6)	33.0 (91.4)	31.0 (87.8)	38.0 (100.4)	31.0 (87.8)	29.0 (84.2)	41.0 (105.8)
Mean daily maximum °C (°F)	21.5 (70.7)	23.2 (73.8)	25.4 (77.7)	28.1 (82.6)	30.2 (86.4)	29.4 (84.9)	27.1 (80.8)	26.7 (80.1)	25.7 (78.3)	25.4 (77.7)	24.3 (75.7)	22.2 (72.0)	25.8 (78.4)
Daily mean °C (°F)	12.5 (54.5)	13.9 (57.0)	15.7 (60.3)	18.0 (64.4)	20.3 (68.5)	20.9 (69.6)	19.9 (67.8)	19.5 (67.1)	18.7 (65.7)	17.6 (63.7)	15.3 (59.5)	13.3 (55.9)	17.1 (62.8)
Mean daily minimum °C (°F)	3.5 (38.3)	4.6 (40.3)	6.0 (42.8)	8.0 (46.4)	10.4 (50.7)	12.3 (54.1)	12.6 (54.7)	12.3 (54.1)	11.8 (53.2)	9.7 (49.5)	6.4 (43.5)	4.5 (40.1)	8.5 (47.3)
Record low °C (°F)	−6.0 (21.2)	−5.0 (23.0)	−1.5 (29.3)	−1.0 (30.2)	3.0 (37.4)	3.0 (37.4)	7.0 (44.6)	4.0 (39.2)	2.0 (35.6)	0.0 (32.0)	−4.0 (24.8)	−11.0 (12.2)	−11.0 (12.2)
Average precipitation mm (inches)	30.8 (1.21)	17.9 (0.70)	4.9 (0.19)	3.1 (0.12)	14.7 (0.58)	68.7 (2.70)	122.4 (4.82)	102.6 (4.04)	86.8 (3.42)	38.2 (1.50)	10.2 (0.40)	15.1 (0.59)	515.4 (20.29)
Average rainy days (≥ 1 mm)	3.0	1.7	0.7	1.0	2.8	9.8	12.7	11.2	9.4	4.6	1.7	2.2	60.8
Source: Servicio Meteorológico Nacional

== Etymology ==
The name Susticacán is believed to be derived from the Tarascan etsosticacán, meaning "place of the strong canyon." The modified Susticacán is a result of changing dialects of the time.

== History ==
The first indigenous inhabitants of the region, a Zacatecos band of Chichimeca, were not subdued by force from Spanish conquistadors, but rather became integrated into the government of New Spain with the establishment of the Catholic faith. The town of Santo Tomás de Etsosticacán was founded in 1562 by local indigenous peoples under the leadership of Andrés Melchor. The Spaniards originally permitted the natives to live under their own laws with Melchor as their first leader.

The original land allocation was imprecise and in 1597 the area was reduced to fewer than 800 hectares. In the 17th century, this led to the acquisition of additional land due to social organization and the collective efforts of residents, including the work of religious congregations such as the Brotherhood of the Virgin of the Assumption (also called La Virgen del Rayo).

In 1648, Juan Antonio, the indigenous steward of the Brotherhood, purchased a large tract of land the mountains and with his family founded the ranch Chiquihuitillo, a community in the municipality of Susticacán known today as El Chiquihuite. In the years that followed, the boundaries of the municipality continued to expand with the formation of additional communities into the late 18th century.

The town later switched its patronage first to St. Peter of Alcántara, and then in 1677 to the Virgin of the Immaculate Conception; a church dedicated to her was built in 1704.

After Mexican independence, Susticacán became part of the partido or district of Jerez. A municipal government (junta municipal) was established for the town on 29 October 1833. After partidos were abolished in 1916, Susticacán became an independent municipality. A dirt road connecting Susticacán to Jerez was built in 1960; Susticacán Reservoir was built from 1962 to 1965; and the municipal seat was electrified in 1968.

== Administration ==
The municipal government of Susticacán comprises a president, a councillor (Spanish: síndico), and seven trustees (regidores), four elected by relative majority and three by proportional representation. The current president of the municipality is Fabiola Rodríguez Saldívar.

== Demographics ==
Susticacán is the least populous municipality in Zacatecas. In the 2020 INEGI census, it recorded a population of 1365 inhabitants living in 404 households. The 2010 Census recorded a population of 1360 inhabitants in Susticacán.

There are eight inhabited localities in the municipality, of which only the municipal seat, also called Susticacán, is classified as urban. It recorded a population of 929 inhabitants in the 2020 Census.

== Economy ==
According to the 2015 Intercensal Survey, 22% of Susticacán's workforce was employed in the primary sector, 45% in the secondary sector, 5% in commerce, and 27% in services. Economic activities in the municipality include farming of silage corn and oats, and tourism.
