= Fernando Ramírez =

Fernando Ramírez can refer to:

- Fernando Ramírez (Mexican athlete), a Mexican sprinter who competed in the 1932 Summer Olympics
- Fernando Ramírez (Norwegian athlete), a retired athlete who represented Norway in several World Championships
- Fernando Ramírez de Haro, 10th Marquis of Villanueva del Duero, a Spanish aristocrat
- Fernando Ramírez de Haro, 16th Count of Bornos, a Spanish aristocrat

== See also ==
- Fernando Remírez de Estenoz, a Cuban politician
