= Tiburcio Arnáiz Muñoz =

Spanish Roman Catholic priest

Blessed Tiburcio Arnaiz Muñoz SJ
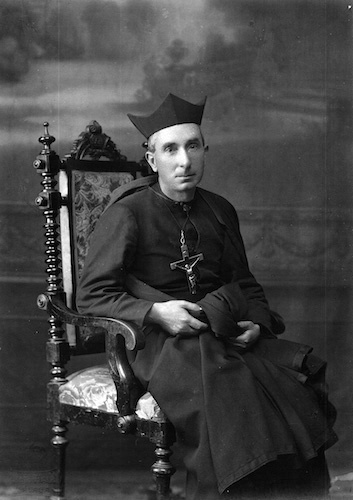
- Pictured circa 1910.
- Born: 11 August 1865; Valladolid, Kingdom of Spain
- Died: 18 July 1926 (aged 60); Málaga, Kingdom of Spain
- Venerated in: Roman Catholic Church
- Beatified: 20 October 2018, Catedral Basílica de la Encarnación, Málaga, Spain by Cardinal Giovanni Angelo Becciu
- Feast: 18 July

Tiburcio Arnaiz Muñoz (11 August 1865 - 18 July 1926) was a Spanish Roman Catholic priest and a professed member of the Jesuits. He was also the co-founder of the Missionaries of the Rural Parishes (1922) and decided to establish it to further his own pastoral goals of aiding the poor with a particular emphasis on workers and people living in those rural areas across the nation. His ecclesial career was spent in two parishes for just over a decade, before he entered the Jesuit novitiate. He became known for his tender care of all people.

His canonization cause opened under Pope John Paul II on 5 December 1989 and he became titled as a Servant of God while Pope Francis named him as venerable after confirming his heroic virtue on 10 October 2016. Francis confirmed a miracle attributed to him on 18 December 2017 and cleared him for beatification. The beatification was celebrated on 20 October 2018.

== Life ==
Arnaiz was born in Valladolid on 11 August 1865 as the younger of two children to Ezequiel and his wife; his elder sister was Gregoria (b. 1858). He was born at 23 Calle de Panaderos. His father died in August 1870.

His ecclesial studies saw him as an internal student though his harsh economic condition prompted him to continue his studies as an external student. During the course of his education he served as a sacristan to the Dominican nuns at their San Felipe convent. Arnaiz was ordained to the priesthood on 20 April 1890 and from 1893 served as the parish priest at Villanueva de Duero until at least 1896. He earned a doctorate in theological studies at Toledo on 19 December 1896 at which point he was transferred to a new parish since his superiors thought it would be better for one of his talents. This transferral was to Poyales del Hoyo; his mother died not long following this. He joined the Jesuits on 30 March 1902 and entered the novitiate in Granada and his novitiate ended in 1904. In September 1909 he spent a brief period of time in Murcia. His sister - after their mother died - joined the Dominican nuns at the convent where he had once served as their sacristan.

In 1911 he was in Málaga where he dedicated himself to tending to the poor and those in need. He soon became concerned with those living in farms and in other rural locations, though also spent some time in Loyola. He was in Cádiz from 1916 to 1917 before returning to Málaga to continue his work. In 1922 he co-founded the Missionaries of the Rural Parishes, alongside María Isabel González del Valle Sarandeses, whom he had come to know. This organization would be of use to the priest in his unwavering commitment to the moral and cultural wellbeing of the poor with an added emphasis on those who lived in remote and rural areas. Arnaiz also knew the Bishop of Málaga Manuel González García who had praised him for his work and encouraged him to continue it on a grand scale.

In June 1926, he fell ill when preaching the novena for the Sacred Heart of Jesus. He suffered from a high fever, and a car was sent for him to take him to his residence where he was confined to bed and soon diagnosed with bronchopneumonia. He died from this a month later, and his remains were interred in the church of the Corazón de Jesús in Málaga after his Jesuit compatriots secured special permission to do so.

== Beatification ==
Arnaiz's beatification cause commenced under Pope John Paul II on 5 December 1989 after the Congregation for the Causes of Saints issued the official "nihil obstat" and titled him as a Servant of God; the diocesan process took place in the Málaga diocese from 18 March 1990 until its closure later on 23 December 1995. The C.C.S. later validated this in Rome on 23 February 1996 before receiving the Positio dossier in two parts in 2008 and then on 27 April 2010. Historians first approved this cause on 3 June 2008 as did theologians sometime later while the C.C.S. also approved it on 4 October 2016.

On 10 October 2016 he was proclaimed to be venerable after Pope Francis confirmed that the late Jesuit priest had lived a model Christian life of heroic virtue. The miracle required for his beatification was investigated in Málaga and concerned the mid-1990s cure of a man who had been in a coma for a week and was on the verge of death; he likewise suffered from a cardiorespiratory arrest. The C.C.S. validated this process too prior to a medical panel approving that science could not explain the healing on 15 December 2016. Theologians also approved this miracle later on 27 June 2017. The cardinal and bishop members confirmed this healing as a miracle on 21 November 2017 with Pope Francis later giving final recognition needed for it a month after on 18 December. The beatification was celebrated on 20 October 2018 with Cardinal Giovanni Angelo Becciu presiding over the celebration on the pope's behalf.

The current postulator for this cause is Silvia Mónica Correale and the vice-postulator is the Jesuit priest Vicente Luque.
