= Haro =

Haro may refer to:

== Places ==
- Los Haro, a town in Jerez, Zacatecas, Mexico
- Haro, La Rioja, a town in Spain
- Haro Maya (woreda), Ethiopia
- Haro River, a river in Pakistan
- Haró, the Hungarian name for Hărău Commune, Hunedoara County, Romania
- Haro Strait, between British Columbia, Canada and Washington, United States
- Haro Woods, an urban forest in the Municipality of Saanich, British Columbia

== People ==
- Haro (surname)
- House of Haro, Spanish nobility
- Haro Aso, Japanese manga artist

== Other uses ==
- Haro Bikes, a BMX bicycle manufacturer
- Haro (character), a fictional robot in the Gundam metaseries
- Help a Reporter Out (HARO), a website that connects reporters with experts

== See also ==
- Clameur de haro, an ancient legal injunction
