= Diego Lopes =

Diego Lopes may refer to:

- Diego Lopes (footballer) (born 1994), Brazilian footballer
- Diego Lopes (fighter) (born 1994), Brazilian mixed martial artist

== See also ==
- Diego López (disambiguation)
