= Ignacio Ramírez =

Ignacio Ramírez may refer to:

- Ignacio Ramírez (politician) (1818-1879), Mexican politician and writer
- Ignacio Ramírez de Haro, 15th Count of Bornos (1918-2010), Spanish nobleman
- Ignacio Ramírez (volleyball) (born 1976), Mexican volleyball player
- Ignacio Ramírez (footballer) (born 1997), Uruguayan footballer
