= Jaime Daniel Castaño Zacarías =

Mexican journalist, (d. 2020)

- Died: 9 December 2020; Jerez de García Salinas, Mexico
- Burial place: Panteón de Dolores, Jerez de García Salinas
- Occupation: Journalist

Jaime Daniel Castaño Zacarías (died 9 December 2020) was a Mexican journalist. He was assassinated on 9 December 2020.
