= Jerez River (Mexico) =

Location
- Country: Mexico

Physical characteristics
- Mouth
  - location: Colotlán River

The Jerez River (Mexico) is a river of Mexico. It is a tributary of the Colotlán River, part of the Río Grande de Santiago system.

== See also ==
- List of rivers of Mexico
