= Count of Bornos =

Countship of Bornos
- Creation date: 10 August 1642
- Created by: Philip IV
- Peerage: Peerage of Spain
- First holder: Diego Ramírez de Haro y Gaitán de Ayala, 1st Count of Bornos
- Present holder: Fernando Ramírez de Haro y Valdés, 16th Count of Bornos

Count of Bornos (Spanish: Conde de Bornos) is a hereditary title in the Peerage of Spain accompanied by the dignity of Grandee, granted in 1642 by Philip IV to Diego Ramírez de Haro, captain of arquebusiers and Gentilhombre of Charles II when he was an infant.

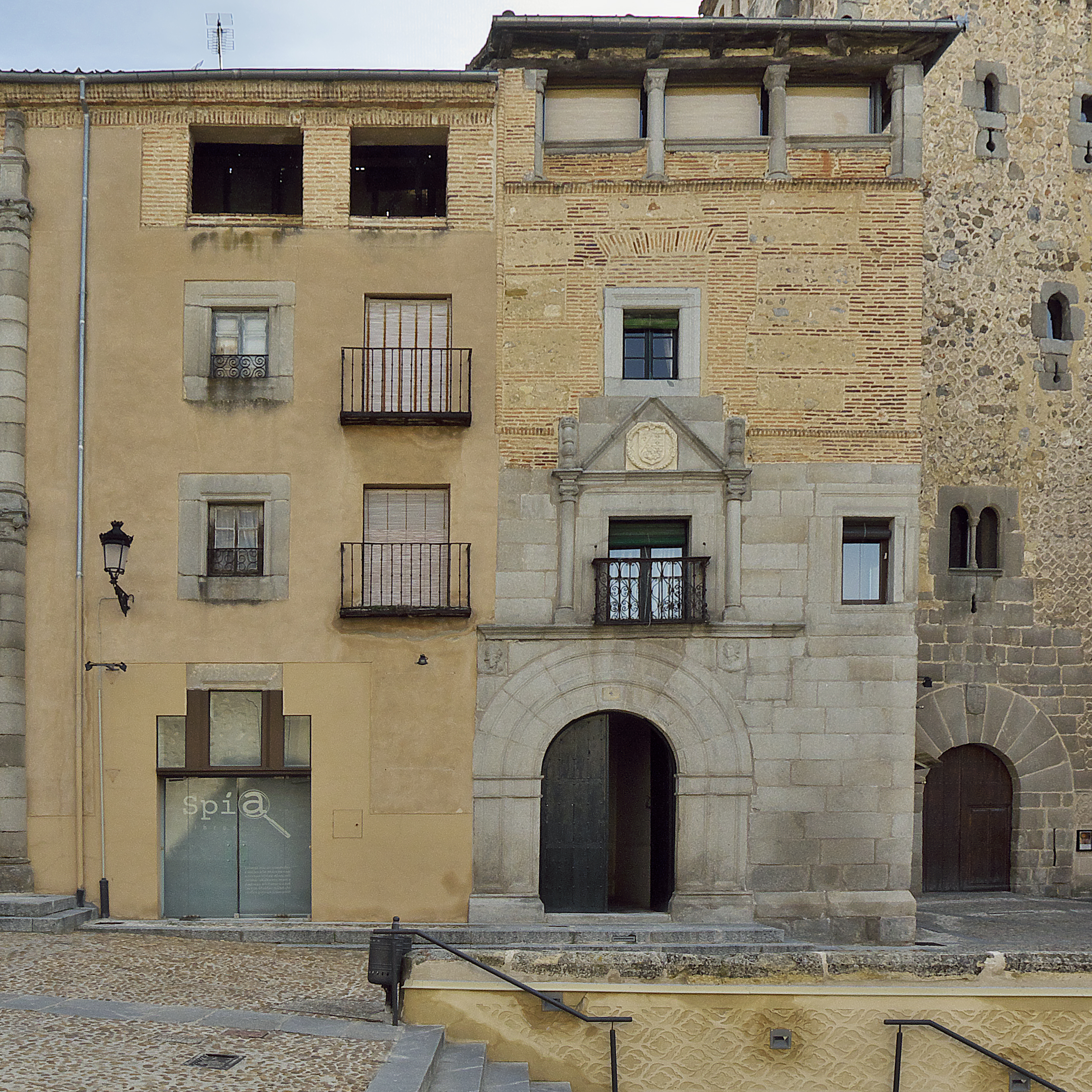
Medieval tower of the Counts of Bornos in Segovia

== Counts of Bornos (1642) ==
- Diego Ramírez de Haro y Gaitán de Ayala, 1st Count of Bornos
- Francisco Ramírez de Haro y Gaitán de Ayala, 2nd Count of Bornos
- Antonio Ramírez de Haro y Otazo de Guevara, 3rd Count of Bornos
- Ángela Ramírez de Haro y Otazo de Guevara, 4th Countess of Bornos
- Inés Ramírez de Haro y Losada, 5th Countess of Bornos
- Ignacio Ramírez de Haro y Lasso de la Vega, 6th Count of Bornos
- Onofre Ramírez de Haro y Lasso de la Vega, 7th Count of Bornos
- Joaquín Ramírez de Haro y Adsor, 8th Count of Bornos
- Antonio Ramírez de Haro y Ramírez de Arellano, 9th Count of Bornos
- José Ramírez de Haro y Ramírez de Arellano, 10th Count of Bornos
- Manuel Ramírez de Haro y Bellvís de Moncada, 11th Count of Bornos
- María Asunción Ramírez de Haro y Crespí de Valldaura, 12th Count of Bornos
- Fernando María Ramírez de Haro y Patiño, 13th Count of Bornos
- Fernando Ramírez de Haro y Álvarez de Toledo, 14th Count of Bornos
- Ignacio Ramírez de Haro y Pérez de Guzmán, 15th Count of Bornos
- Fernando Ramírez de Haro y Valdés, 16th Count of Bornos

== See also ==
- List of current grandees of Spain

== Bibliography ==
- Hidalgos de España, Real Asociación de (2018). Elenco de Grandezas y Títulos Nobiliarios Españoles. Ediciones Hidalguía. ISBN 978-84-94841-02-6.
