= Lope Díaz de Haro =

Lope Díaz de Haro may refer to:

- Lope Díaz I de Haro (1105–1170)
- Lope Díaz II de Haro Cabeza Brava (1170–1236)
- Lope Díaz III de Haro (died 1288)
- Lope Díaz de Haro (died 1322), Lord of Orduña and Balmaseda

== See also ==
- Diego López de Haro (disambiguation)
- House of Haro
