= Diego López (footballer, born 1996) =

Argentine footballer

Personal information
- Full name: Diego Ignacio López
- Date of birth: 14 February 1996 (age 30)
- Place of birth: Sunchales, Argentina
- Position: Midfielder

Youth career
- Unión Sunchales

Senior career*
Years	Team	Apps	(Gls)
2013–2017	Unión Sunchales	57	(13)
2017–2018	Agropecuario	1	(0)
2018	Guillermo Brown	3	(0)
2019–2021	Unión Sunchales	41	(8)
2021	Ben Hur	6	(2)
2022	Sportivo Las Parejas	9	(0)
- * Club domestic league appearances and goals

Diego Ignacio López (born 14 February 1996) is an Argentine footballer who plays as a midfielder.

== Career ==
López began his career with Unión Sunchales. After making three appearances as they won promotion from Torneo Federal B in 2014, he made his bow in Torneo Federal A on 29 March 2015 during a draw with Vélez de San Ramón. In his second season, López scored his first senior goal against Defensores de Pronunciamiento. The 2016–17 campaign saw López score thirteen times, including braces over Defensores de Belgrano and Gimnasia y Tiro. Agropecuario, 2016–17 champions, signed López in July 2017, ahead of their season in Primera B Nacional. A twenty-three minute cameo against Atlético de Rafaela gave López his pro debut.

López joined Guillermo Brown on 30 June 2018. He featured in three fixtures before leaving midway through the campaign to rejoin Unión Sunchales in January 2019. He departed in June 2020.

== Career statistics ==
As of 10 July 2020.

Club statistics
Club	Season	League			Cup		League Cup		Continental		Other		Total	
Club	Season	Division	Apps	Goals	Apps	Goals	Apps	Goals	Apps	Goals	Apps	Goals	Apps	Goals
Unión Sunchales	2015	Torneo Federal A	20	0	0	0	—		—		7 (Note: Appearance(s) in the Torneo Federal A play-offs)	0	27	0
Unión Sunchales	2016	Torneo Federal A	7	1	2	0	—		—		0	0	9	1
Unión Sunchales	2016–17	Torneo Federal A	27	12	3	0	—		—		2	1	32	13
Unión Sunchales	Total		54	13	5	0	—		—		9	1	68	14
Agropecuario	2017–18	Primera B Nacional	1	0	0	0	—		—		0	0	1	0
Guillermo Brown	2018–19	Primera B Nacional	3	0	1	0	—		—		0	0	4	0
Unión Sunchales	2018–19	Torneo Federal A	8	2	2	0	—		—		0	0	10	2
Unión Sunchales	2019–20	Torneo Federal A	8	3	1	0	—		—		0	0	9	3
Unión Sunchales	Total		16	5	3	0	—		—		0	0	19	5
Career total			74	18	9	0	—		—		9	1	92	19
