= Los Haro =

- Coat of arms
- Interactive map of Los Haro
- Coordinates: 22°46′00″N 102°57′46″W
- Country: Mexico
- State: Zacatecas
- Municipality: Jerez
- Founder: Jesus Haros
- Elevation: 2,000 m (6,600 ft)

Population (2022)
  - Total: 4
- Demonym: Jerezano/a
- Time zone: UTC−5 (UTC)
- Area code: 494

Los Haro is a small village located about 10 miles from the town center of Jerez, Zacatecas, Mexico. Los Haro was first settled by Spanish immigrants over 400 years ago, around the same time that the first English settlements were getting started in North America. Since the time of its founding, Los Haro has had a colorful history, enduring as an independent ranching and farming community on the periphery of Spanish control. Since the 1950s men have traveled to work in the vineyards and wineries of Napa, California; there are now some 200 families living and working in Napa; other families have settled in Sacramento, Los Angeles, Phoenix, as well as in towns and cities in Colorado and Texas. While people have become geographically dispersed, many still see themselves as belonging to Los Haro and maintain a strong connection and a deep affection for their hometown, making this a truly "transnational" community.

As of 2010, the population was of about 900. It is named after one of the original 10 families who settled the town during the 17th century.

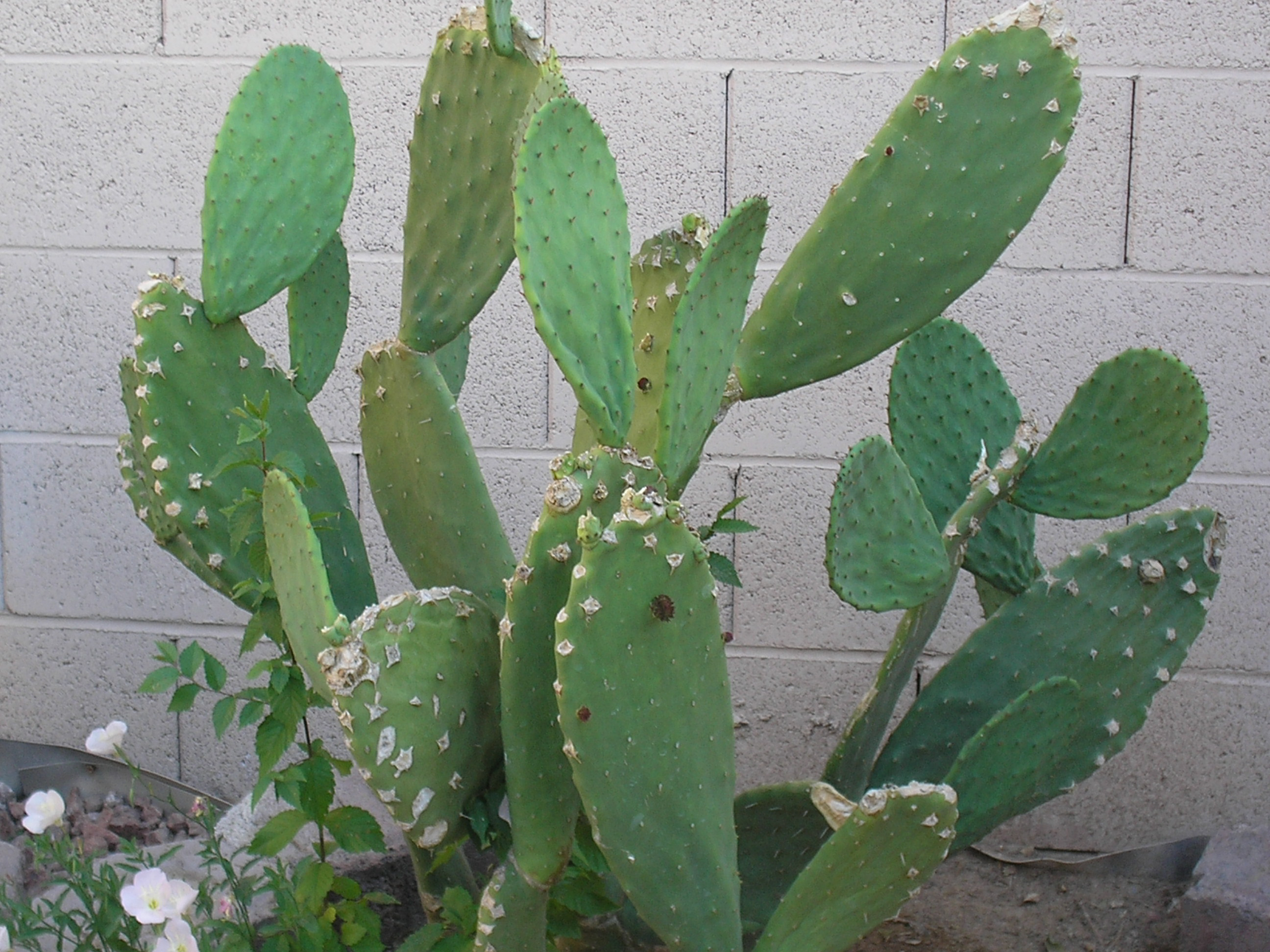
Captive prickly pear grown for food

== History ==
=== Pre-Hispanic ===
Prior to the arrival of the Spanish, the Jerez Valley was home to Chichimecas who cultivated corn and squash adjacent to the river and streams. However, for the most part this vast region of semi-arid land was the domain of bands of hunter-gatherers who successfully resisted any attempts at control by the Aztec empire in the south. The Chichimecas instilled fear upon Meso-American sedentary people thanks to their fierce tactics of lightning raids and scalping of enemies. These marksmen hunted, with bow and arrow, deer, rabbits, snakes, and rats.

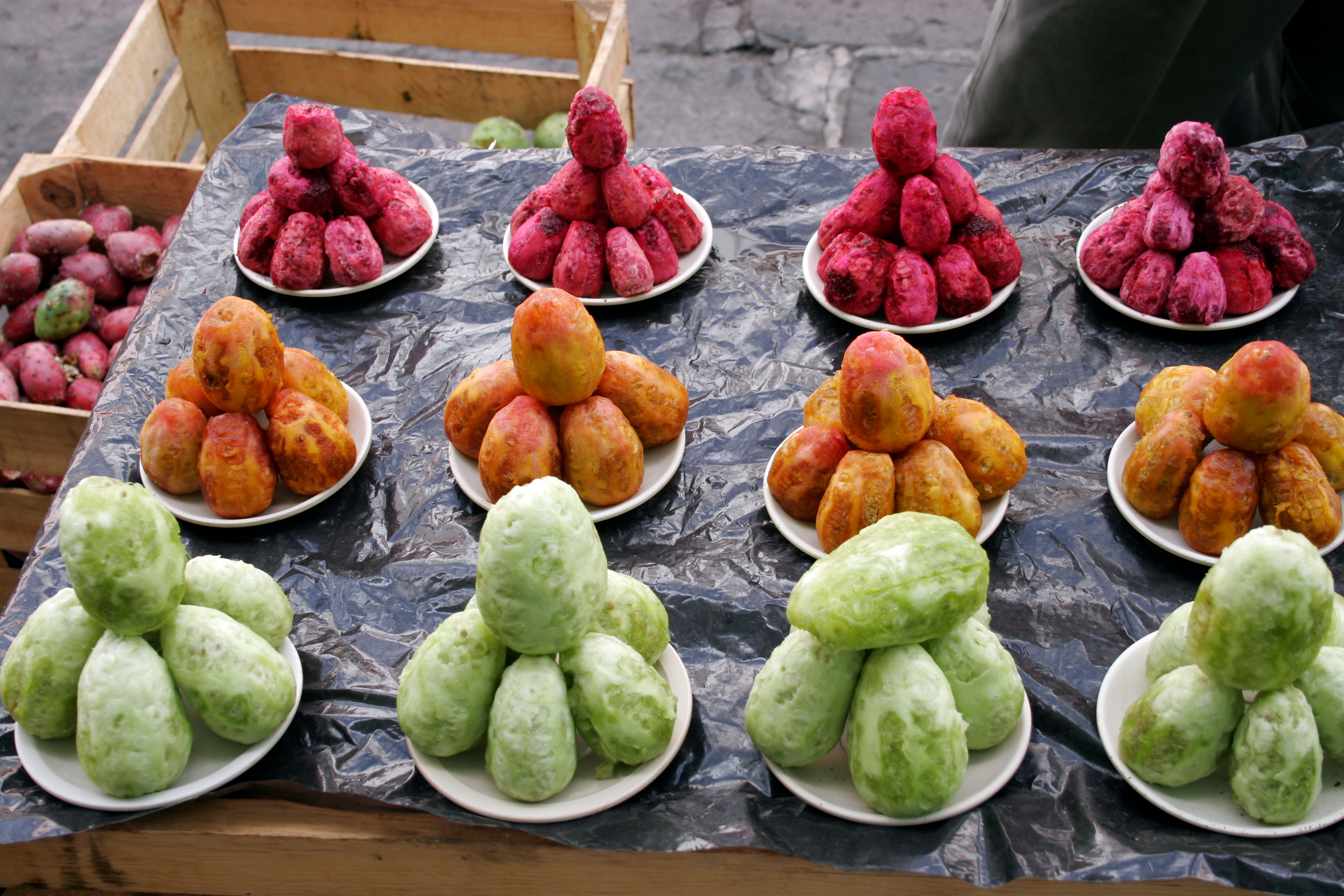
Prickly pear fruit for sale at a market, Zacatecas, Mexico

The nopal cactus and mesquite were vital to their subsistence. From the nopal, they ate its leaves, hearts, flowers and the fruit called "tunas" and from the mesquite they made bread cakes that could be stored. Unlike their neighbors to the South, whose rich volcanic soils and rainfall made possible agriculture that could generate a considerable surplus, their semi-arid ecosystem forced substantial mobility.

=== Arrival of the Spaniards ===
In the 1540s, rich silver deposits were discovered in Zacatecas brought about the onset of a silver rush and the eventual demise of the Chichimeca hunter-gatherer ways. Spanish fortune seekers, slaves, free laborers, soldiers, priests, merchants, and administrators populated the area. Their arrival demanded a productive, sedentary agriculture. Initially, these workers obtained the necessary materials and foodstuffs from other established posts in New Spain such as Guadalajara. The arduous routes, prevalent with attacks by the Chichimeca, forced mine owners to turn to closer sources of supply, such as the Jerez Valley. The Jerez Valley was already a connection point between Fresnillo and Guadalajara. In the Jerez Valley, they could raise cattle, horses, sheep and mules to supply the mines. By the early 17th century land grants and agricultural development were beginning to take place throughout the Jerez Valley. The present-day Los Haro, adjacent to the Jerez-Fresnillo road at the northern end of the Valley, was settled in the early 1600s by a Spaniard named Tomas Gonzales. By 1700, at least 10 Spanish immigrant families were living there bearing the surnames of Aro, Hurtado, Muñiz de Chavez, Felix de la Cruz, and Perez. Later arrivals included the De Haros, De Loeras, Seguras, Saldivars, Castañedas, and Acuñas, all of which are established family names today. A key feature that sets Los Haro apart from other towns, besides the strong continuity of these family lineages, is that from its origin it has been free and fiercely independent community of families. Unlike most of the other settlements in the Jerez Valley, it was neither established by the Spanish crown as a means of settling Indians, nor was it an hacienda where residents lived in a state of semi-slavery. The layout of the town attests its origins. Instead of the characteristic grid pattern mandated by the Council of Indies in Seville, the layout of Los Haro is rather an original one: with no central plaza to anchor the settlements, the streets and individual lot extend in ribbon-fashion along the right bank of the river, with three neighborhoods, each developing its own fresh spring water. These original neighborhoods are still identified with the town's three principal families, the De Haros in the center, the Santiagos in the northern, and the Saldivars in the south.

=== Colonial era ===
The settlers of Los Haro sought to escape the restraint of central authority by moving out to the periphery, where the Crown's power was the weakest. Of modest origin, these immigrants moved to remote terrains to buy land, intermarry with local inhabitants and to carry out livelihoods of independence and self-reliance. These pioneers came to the New World not simply to amass fortune, fame and status before returning to Spain wealthy men, but instead to settle and develop new lives for themselves, and on their own terms. As the colonial silver economy of Zacatecas developed, Los Haro found itself in the middle of large haciendas that were controlled by the Church, merchants and miners. Throughout the colonial era and into the first decade of the 20th century, Los Haro maintained a symbiotic, though uneasy, relationship with these neighboring haciendas. These haciendas were integral to the survival and productivity of the Zacatecas mining districts, which were the main engine of New Spain's silver economy for nearly 200 years. They supplied meat, hides, work animals, food and other necessities to the nearby mines. The Los Haro residents often made extended trips to neighboring communities as well as the city of Zacatecas to exchange surplus grain, livestock, cheeses, eggs, fruits, and vegetables, for cloth, tools, and other manufactured goods. These haciendas also provided the men of Los Haro with a source of employment when they needed to supplement their own family's income. More often than not, relations with adjacent haciendas were rife with conflict. The formidable haciendas had twelve-foot walls separating hacienda and town lands. These boundaries fueled conflict and resentment as the hacienda foremen and settlers clashed over water, arable land and grazing rights. In addition, Los Haro farmers and their pack animals had to pay nearby haciendas a fee to cross their vast holding on their two-day journey to market in Zacatecas, which only added conflict to the already unstable relations. These tensions would later submerge the region into years of violence and turmoil during the Mexican Revolution.

== Religion ==
The majority of the town residents as well as their descendants are Roman Catholic.

=== Our Lady of Refuge of Los Haro ===
In the late 17th century, a parish in honor of Our Lady of Refuge of Los Haro is constructed. However, one day, the image disappeared from the altar never again to be seen, and thus was eradicated from the memories of Los Haro residents. The parish then fell into ruins.

=== San Rafael Arcangel ===
After the disappearance of the image of Our Lady of Refuge of Los Haro, the community was determined to find a saint to venerate. According to town stories, the Tesorero hacienda would lend Los Haro the San Rafael statue during the annual October town-wide celebration. However, one day the Tesorero hacienda opposed lending Los Haro the saint. Nevertheless, San Rafael appeared in Los Haro during the festival and on the way to Los Haro, small traces were recorded. The owners of the hacienda then decided to give the community of Los Haro, San Rafael. In return, Los Haro residents began the construction of a new church on April 6, 1905. The church was completed on June 6, 1906. The annual town fiesta, in late October, continues to honor San Rafael to this present day.

== Culture ==
=== La Morisma ===
The celebration for the patron saint, San Rafael, is famous throughout Zacatecas because of the Morisma that takes place over the three days, from October 23 through the 25th. The Morisma is a grand recreation enacting a scripted drama that recounts Medieval conflict between the Christians and Muslims. These recreations date back to at least 900 years to a Spain invaded with Muslims. The Morisma is based on the Battle of Lepanto, in which Christian forces under John of Austria defeated the Turkish (Ottoman) navy in 1571, thereby impeding Muslim expansion into Europe. Don Quixote author, Miguel de Cervantes, participated in the battle and later wrote an account on it, from which the Los Haro libretto is drawn. A key feature that sets apart the Los Haro Morisma from the larger version performed at Bracho, Zacatecas, is the presence of mounted cavalry. Even though the Battle of Lepanto itself was a naval engagement off the coast of Greece, given the Los Haro terrain and the fact that riding was an integral part of everyday life, it seemed apt to substitute the galleys and display the charro skills of the brave townsmen.

== Economy ==
The economy of Los Haro revolves around farming and agriculture. Mainly rich Plums and Peaches, but often corn.

== Los Haro Summer Camp program ==
The Los Haro Summer Camp program began in 2007 as a pilot project to address the needs of children and youth of a border-spanning Mexican community. Thousands of Mexico-U.S. transnational communities have developed over the last half century as people have left their villages in search of jobs and opportunities in the United States. Los Haro being one of them. As with the children of Mexican immigrants in general, life for the second generation can be a confusing challenge. They are caught between two worlds and often find themselves struggling to reconcile their parents’ reality with the need to function in a society that is at once unfamiliar to their parents, and full of risks for themselves. Researchers have found that the immigrant children who stay in school and do best in America are those who retain a connection with their parents’ culture. Awareness and respect for their origins allows for the maintenance of strong family ties and inter-generational bonds, and provides children with a sense of self-worth that helps anchor them while they navigate the turbulence of adolescence in the United States.

The Los Haro Summer Camp emerged from the concerns of the Los Haro Support Committee (Comité de Apoyo Los Haro), a Napa-based volunteer hometown organization. In the past, dedicated members of the Los Haro community in Napa have raised funds for a variety of projects to benefit the home village, including support for the church, to purchase an ambulance, to upgrade the potable water system, to help pave village streets, among other projects. Now this new Committee is taking a fresh approach as it seeks to address problems facing the next generation, both at home and in Napa. In August 2006 members of the Los Haro Support Committee gathered to conduct a diagnosis of their home community's future prospects and concluded that without serious intervention their village would continue its downward spiral towards decay and abandonment as emigration to the United States continues unabated. They noted that new types of problems and tensions are emerging as increasing numbers of youth from the United States travel home to spend the summer with relatives, but once there find themselves with little to do. Adults in Los Haro report growing conflict between local and visiting youths, and a rise in vandalism, alcohol and drug abuse.

In response to this situation, and in consultation with relatives and neighbors in Los Haro, the Committee decided to launch a youth-oriented program to address the need for healthy summer activities, to promote pride and respect for the village, to enhance learning opportunities for both local and visiting youth, and to build bridges of friendship between the two groups.

Through community gatherings, slide shows and other presentations, the Los Haro Support Committee will be shares its experiences and lessons learned with other hometown organizations. Besides strengthening Mexican families and contributing to youth well-being and self-worth, this program builds bridges of friendship and understanding between Mexican families and the wider Napa community.
