= Diego López (footballer, born March 1974) =

Spanish footballer

Personal information
- Full name: Diego Miguel López Santos
- Date of birth: 14 March 1974 (age 52)
- Place of birth: Málaga, Spain
- Height: 1.72 m (5 ft 7 1/2 in)
- Position: Midfielder

Senior career*
Years	Team	Apps	(Gls)
1991–1993	CD Málaga	9	(0)
1993–1994	Málaga CF	35	(6)
1994–1996	Almería	83	(16)
1996–1997	Hércules	24	(2)
1998	Granada	19	(0)
1998–1999	Xerez	34	(7)
1999–2001	Ceuta	60	(10)
2001–2002	Motril	46	(5)
2003	Novelda	17	(0)
2003–2006	Linense		
2006–2008	Granada 74		
Total		327	(46)
- * Club domestic league appearances and goals

Diego Miguel López Santos (born 14 March 1974) is a Spanish former professional footballer who played as a midfielder.

== Career ==
López started his career in 1991 with CD Málaga. He made his professional bow during a Segunda División win away to Sabadell on 17 November, with eight further appearances following as they were relegated. 1993 saw López move to Málaga CF of Segunda División B. He netted six goals, including two on his debut in the Copa del Rey over Almería, in the 1993–94 campaign as he again suffered relegation. Almería subsequently signed López at the end of that season. Eleven goals in thirty-six fixtures came with promotion to the second tier in his first campaign. After two seasons, López was relegated for a third time as they placed seventeenth.

Despite going down with Almería, López moved up to La Liga in 1996 after agreeing a deal with Hércules. Goals against Espanyol and Athletic Bilbao arrived but it was to be relegation again for the midfielder as Hércules finished twenty-first. A short stint with Granada followed, prior to López featuring for Xerez and Ceuta between 1998 and 2001. In 2001, López joined Segunda División B side Motril. His first season with the club ended with the Group IV title, though they missed out on promotion to Getafe, but his secondary campaign concluded with a fifth career relegation. López had subsequent spells with Novelda, Linense and Granada 74.

== Career statistics ==
Club statistics
Club	Season	League			Cup		Continental		Other		Total	
Club	Season	Division	Apps	Goals	Apps	Goals	Apps	Goals	Apps	Goals	Apps	Goals
CD Málaga	1991–92	Segunda División	9	0	0	0	—		0	0	9	0
Málaga CF	1993–94	Segunda División B	35	6	2	2	—		0	0	37	8
Almería	1994–95	Segunda División B	36	11	2	0	—		5 (Note: Appearance(s) in the Segunda División B play-offs)	1	43	12
Almería	1995–96	Segunda División	33	3	3	0	—		0	0	36	3
Almería	1996–97	Segunda División	14	2	4	0	—		0	0	18	2
Almería	Total		83	16	9	0	—		5	1	97	17
Hércules	1996–97	La Liga	23	2	1	0	—		0	0	24	2
Hércules	1997–98	Segunda División	1	0	0	0	—		0	0	1	0
Hércules	Total		24	2	1	0	—		0	0	25	2
Granada	1997–98	Segunda División B	19	0	0	0	—		3	0	22	0
Xerez	1998–99	Segunda División B	34	7	2	0	—		0	0	36	7
Ceuta	1999–2000	Segunda División B	34	7	0	0	—		6	1	40	8
Ceuta	2000–01	Segunda División B	26	3	2	0	—		5	0	33	3
Ceuta	Total		60	10	2	0	—		11	1	73	11
Motril	2001–02	Segunda División B	32	2	0	0	—		6	0	38	2
Motril	2002–03	Segunda División B	14	3	1	0	—		0	0	15	3
Motril	Total		46	5	1	0	—		6	0	53	5
Novelda	2002–03	Segunda División B	17	0	0	0	—		0	0	17	0
Career total			327	46	17	2	—		25	2	369	50

== Honours ==
Motril

- Segunda División B: 2001–02 Group IV
