= Poyales del Hoyo =

- municipality
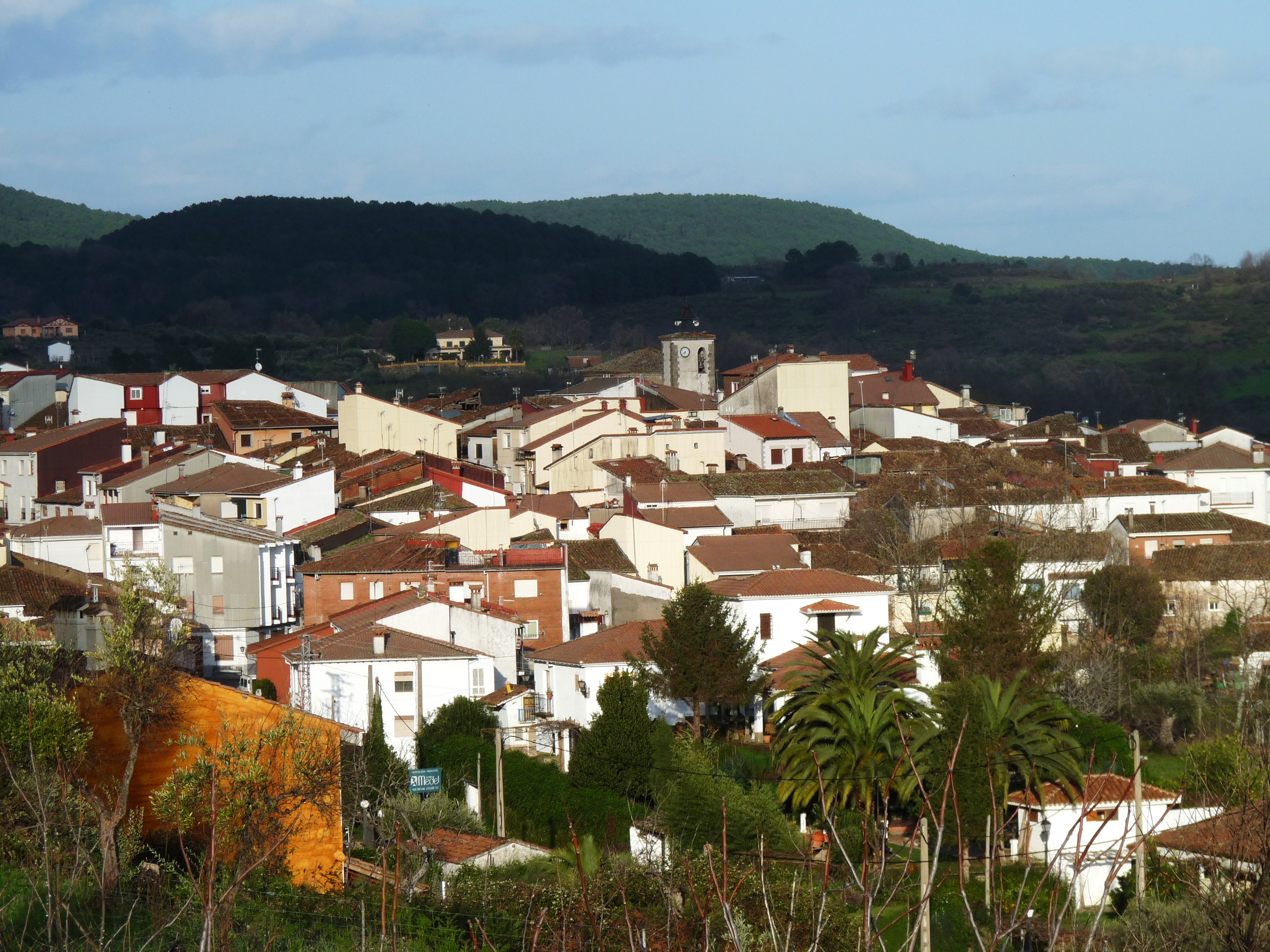
- View of Poyales del Hoyo
- Flag Coat of arms
- Location in Spain. Poyales del Hoyo (Spain)
- Coordinates: 40°10′18″N 5°09′25″W
- Country: Spain
- Autonomous community: Castile and León
- Province: Ávila
- Municipality: Poyales del Hoyo

Area
  - Total: 3 km^{2} (1.2 sq mi)
- Elevation: 750 m (2,460 ft)

Population (2025-01-01)
  - Total: 498
  - Density: 170/km^{2} (430/sq mi)
- Time zone: UTC+1 (CET)
  - Summer (DST): UTC+2 (CEST)
- Website: Official website

Poyales del Hoyo is a municipality located in the province of Ávila, Castile and León, Spain.

== History ==
During the spanish civil war, three women taken from Poyales del Hoyo on the night of 29 December 1936 and murdered by Fallangist at the roadside. All the killers were from the village. The town was famous in Spanish news and even had article in The New York Times about how still there are a big polarization between society in Spain and the unfinished spanish transition to democracy after the dictator Francisco Franco. In 2011, it had clashes at a protest over the exhumation of civil war graves in the village.

== Population ==
Historical population
Year	Pop.	±% p.a.
2023	493	—
2024	487	−1.22%
2025	498	+2.26%
Source: INE
