= Diego López de Haro =

Diego López de Haro may refer to:

- Diego López I de Haro (died 1124×6)
- Diego López II de Haro (1162 – 1214)
- Diego López III de Haro (died 1254)
- Diego López IV de Haro (died 1289)
- Diego López V de Haro (c. 1250 – 1310)
- Diego López VI de Haro, son of Maria of Portugal, Lady of Meneses and Orduña
- Diego López de Haro y Sotomayor (died 1582) I Marques of Carpio

== See also ==
- Diego López (disambiguation)
- Lope Díaz de Haro (disambiguation)
