= Jerez de García Salinas =

Jerez, Zacatecas
- City
- Jerez de García Salinas
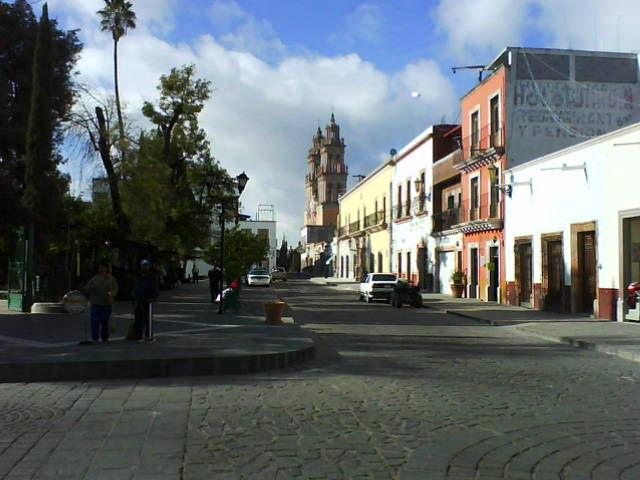
- Calle del Santuario in Jerez

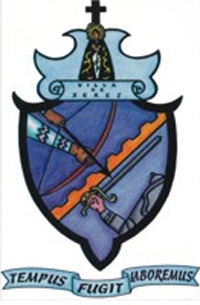
- Coat of arms

- Location within Zacatecas Location within Mexico
- Coordinates: 22°38′53″N 102°59′25″W
- Country: Mexico
- State: Zacatecas
- Municipality: Jerez
- Founded: 1569

Government
  - Municipal president: José Humberto Salazar Contreras; PT; PVEM; Morena; Panal

Area
  - Municipality: 587.26 km^{2} (226.74 sq mi)
- Elevation: 2,000 m (6,600 ft)

Population (2010)
  - Total: 57,610
  - Demonym: Jerezano
- Time zone: UTC-6 (Central (US Central))
- Postal code: 99300

Jerez (Spanish: [xeˈɾes ðe ɣaɾˈsia saˈlinas]) is a town, as well as a municipality, in the Mexican state of Zacatecas. To distinguish the two, the town is officially called Jerez de García Salinas, in honor of a 19th-century reformer. The town of Jerez governs 128 other communities, which comprise a rural area known for its production of fruit trees and dairy. Jerez was designated a Pueblo Mágico to promote tourism, as it is in close proximity to the state capital of Zacatecas and offers handcrafts, traditional food, and architecture.

== The town ==
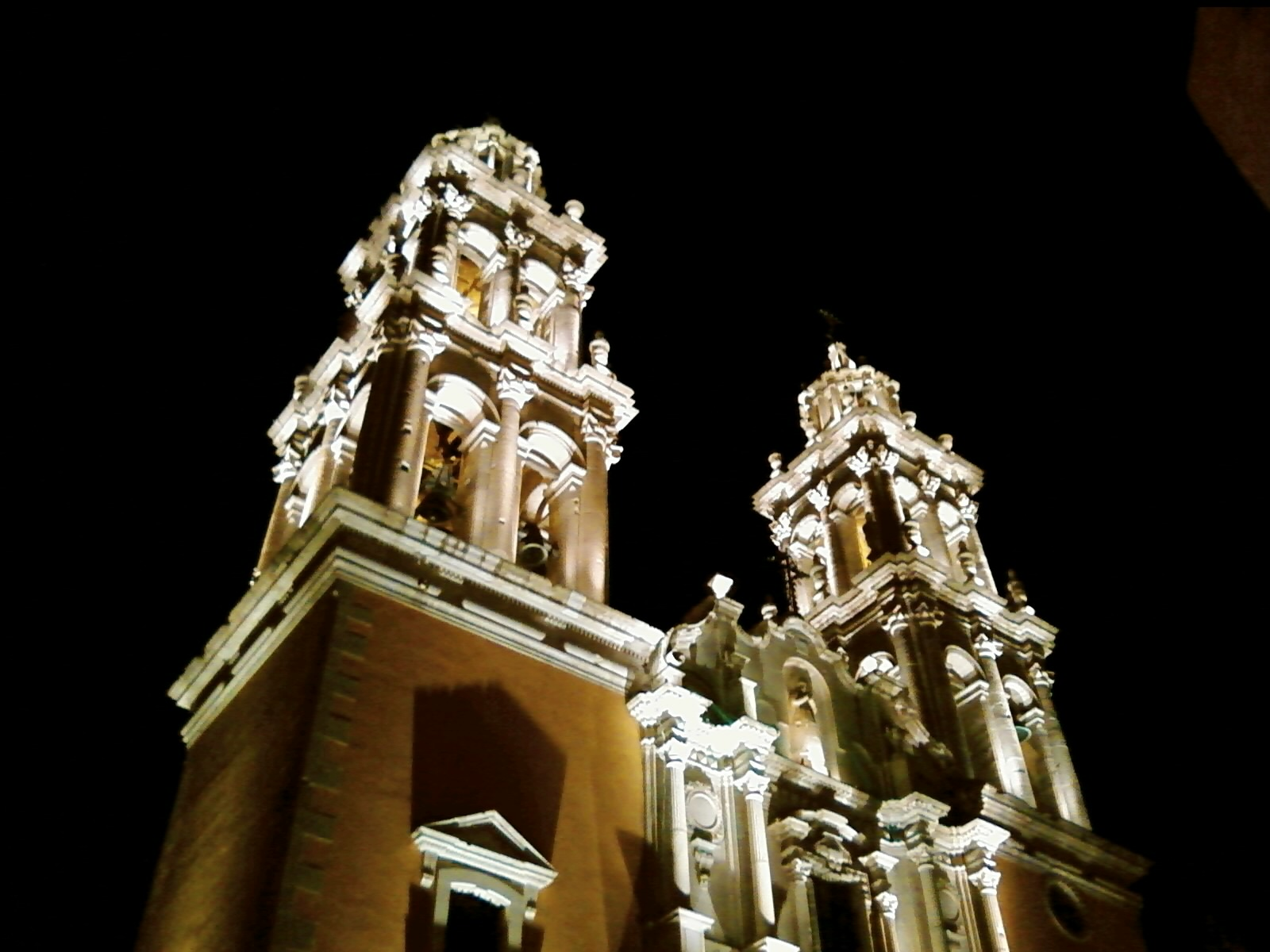
The Sanctuary of Our Lady of Solitude

The town of Jerez is located fifty-seven kilometers west-southwest from the state capital of Zacatecas, nestled in a deep valley surrounded by forests and fruit orchards.

Its architecture and layout distinguish it from the state capital. The town's focal point is a central square known as Jardín (garden) Rafael Páez, which historically served as the site of the traditional market. This square is enclosed by an ornate wrought iron fence, and its centerpiece is a Moorish-style kiosk constructed of metal with a sandstone base. On Sundays, it becomes a popular gathering place for men playing dominoes and for bands performing a local music genre called tamborazo, known for its distinctive rhythm.

On the south side of the square stands the Portal Humboldt, featuring two different styles of arches, one in the Romance style and the other in Arabic. To the north is the Portal Inguanzo, which dates back to 1797 and was originally a private residence. Today, the building has been repurposed into a café and ice cream shop.

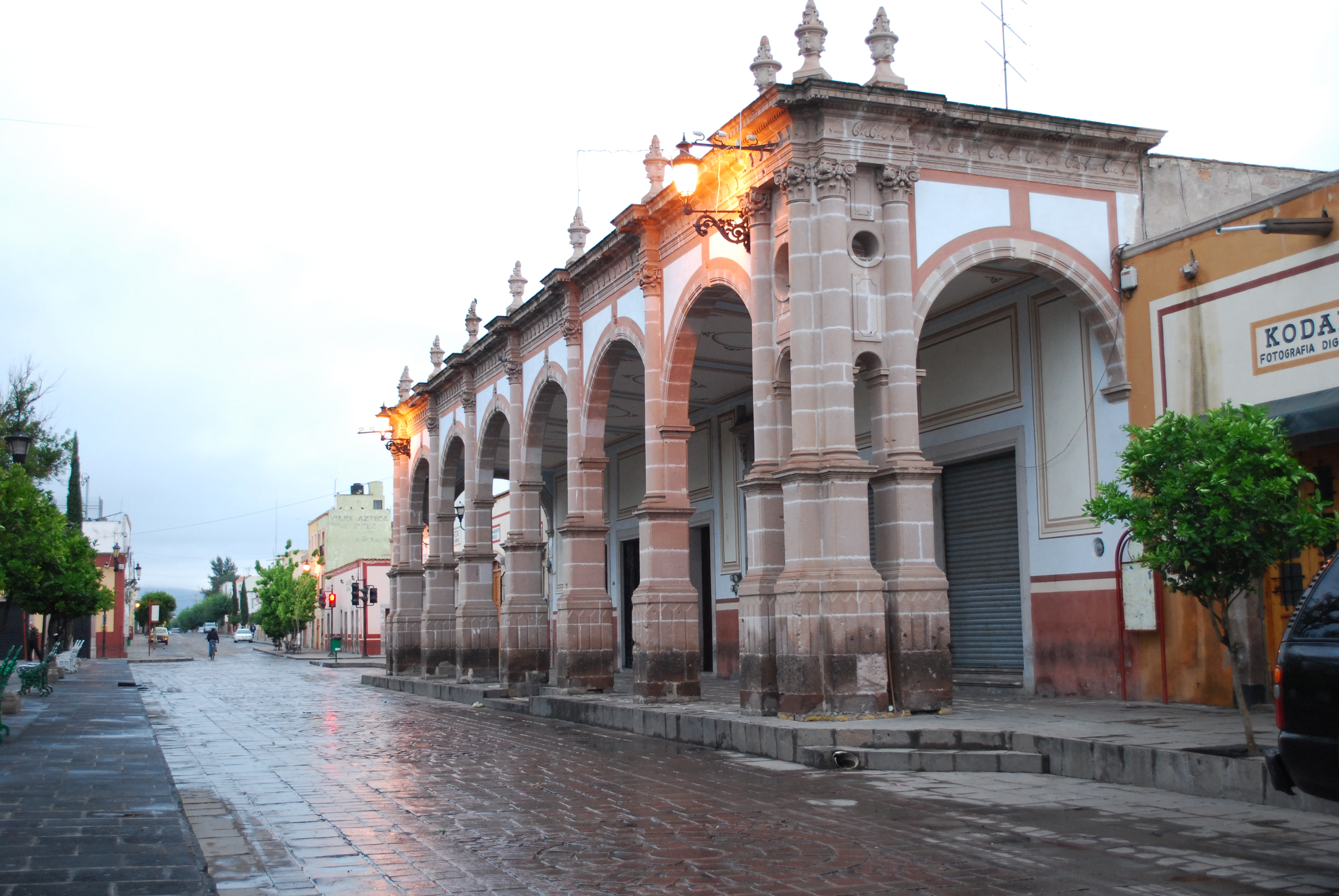
Portal Inguanzo

The Palacio Municipal (Municipal Palace) or town government building is housed in a former two-story mansion that was constructed between 1730 and 1745. The building features a Baroque facade made of sandstone. It underwent renovations in the last decades of the 20th century, but its original facade was meticulously preserved. Inside, there is a central courtyard surrounded by arches, and there are two stairwells connecting the floors. The main staircase is located on the east side, while the south staircase features a portrait of Francisco García Salinas.

The Sanctuary of Nuestra Señora de la Soledad (Our Lady of Solitude) dates back to 1805, built on the site of a former hospital for indigenous people. It is said that the architect drew inspiration from the cathedral in Santiago de Compostela. The style is Neoclassic, although it incorporates various Baroque elements, notably in the main atrium gate. The interior is characterized by the main altar, which houses the image of the Virgin Mary following the death of Jesus. Additionally, the sanctuary features finely sculpted confession booths and a pulpit. This local icon, known as the 'General' and celebrated annually from January to February, gained prominence during the Mexican Revolution when she was honored by troops.

The Edificio de la Torre (Torre Building) was constructed on the site donated by Pantaleón de la Torre in 1894 to promote education and culture in the municipality. Initially, it served as a school for girls. The architectural style of the building is a blend of Romance and Moorish influences, constructed by stonemason Dámaso Muñetón, who was also responsible for the north tower of the Zacatecas Cathedral. Today, the Edificio de la Torre houses the Jerez Cultural Center and the municipal library. Adjacent to the building is an alley dedicated to local handcrafts, including boots, wide cowboy hats, and embroidered leather belts (piteado).

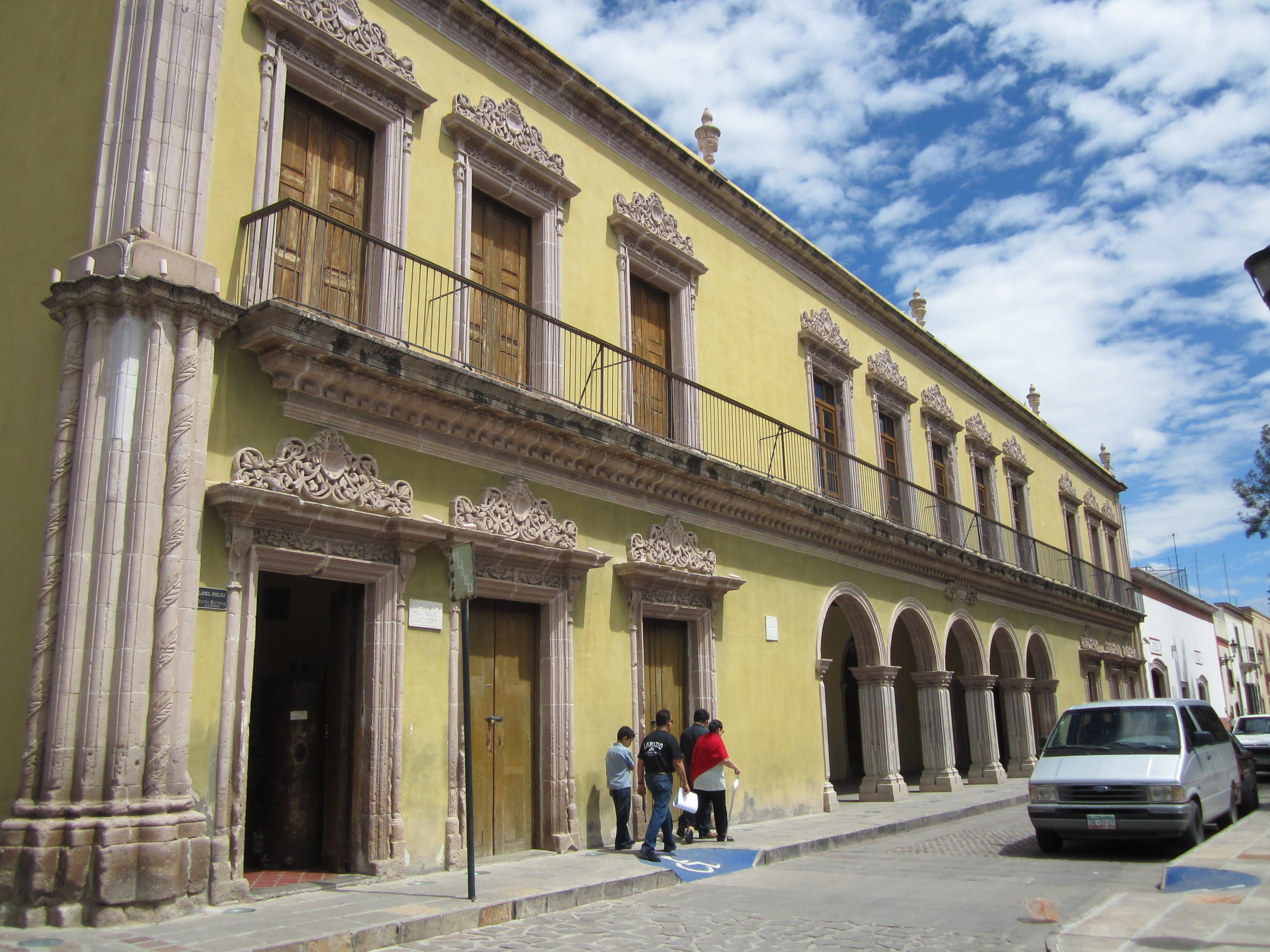
Teatro Hinojosa (Hinojosa Theater)

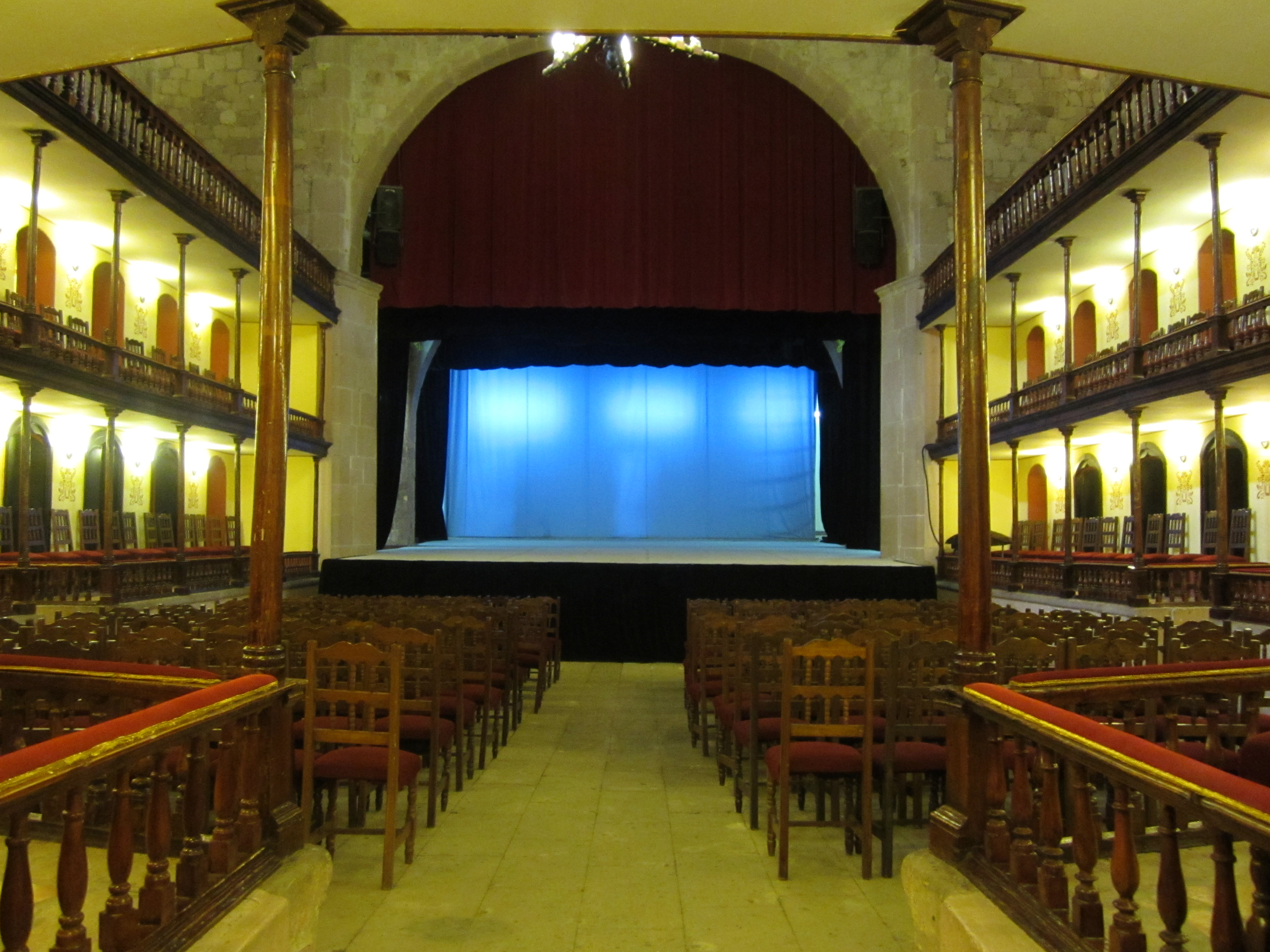
Inside Teatro Hinojosa

Behind the Sanctuary of Nuestra Señora de la Soledad is Jardín (garden) Hidalgo, which faces the Hinojosa Theater. The theater, built in Moorish style with arches, windows, and railings grouped in threes and fives, was constructed between 1876 and 1890 through the efforts of local politician José María Hinojosa. The stage is set beneath a sandstone arch, and the seats are finely carved from wood. Throughout most of its history, lighting was provided by carbide lamps, and a large mirror from that era still remains. It is believed that the building served as a barracks during the Mexican Revolution. Today, it is utilized for live performances, but in the past, it served various functions, including being a movie theater, a venue for social events, a library, and a public school. Adjacent to the building is the Community Museum, which features an array of items such as carpentry tools, archaeological pieces, sewing machines, and more from the area's rich history."

The Ramón López Velarde House Museum is situated on the street named after the town's most famous poet. This house was the childhood home of López Velarde and retains its original furnishings from the 19th century. It also showcases the poet's personal items, including family photographs and copies of manuscripts from works like 'Suave Patria,' which was completed in 1921 to commemorate the 100th anniversary of the end of the Mexican War of Independence. The building was transformed into a museum in 1951, and in 2009, the space underwent renovation, incorporating recordings of López Velarde's verses alongside the original furnishings and many of the poet's personal effects.

The Inmaculada Concepción parish is constructed from white sandstone. It was built in the 18th century, featuring a simple single bell tower and a Baroque facade. The arch of the main entrance is crowned by a papal crown and the keys of Saint Peter, with images of the Four Evangelists nearby. The interior is Neoclassical, adorned with gold leaf accents on the altars and columns.

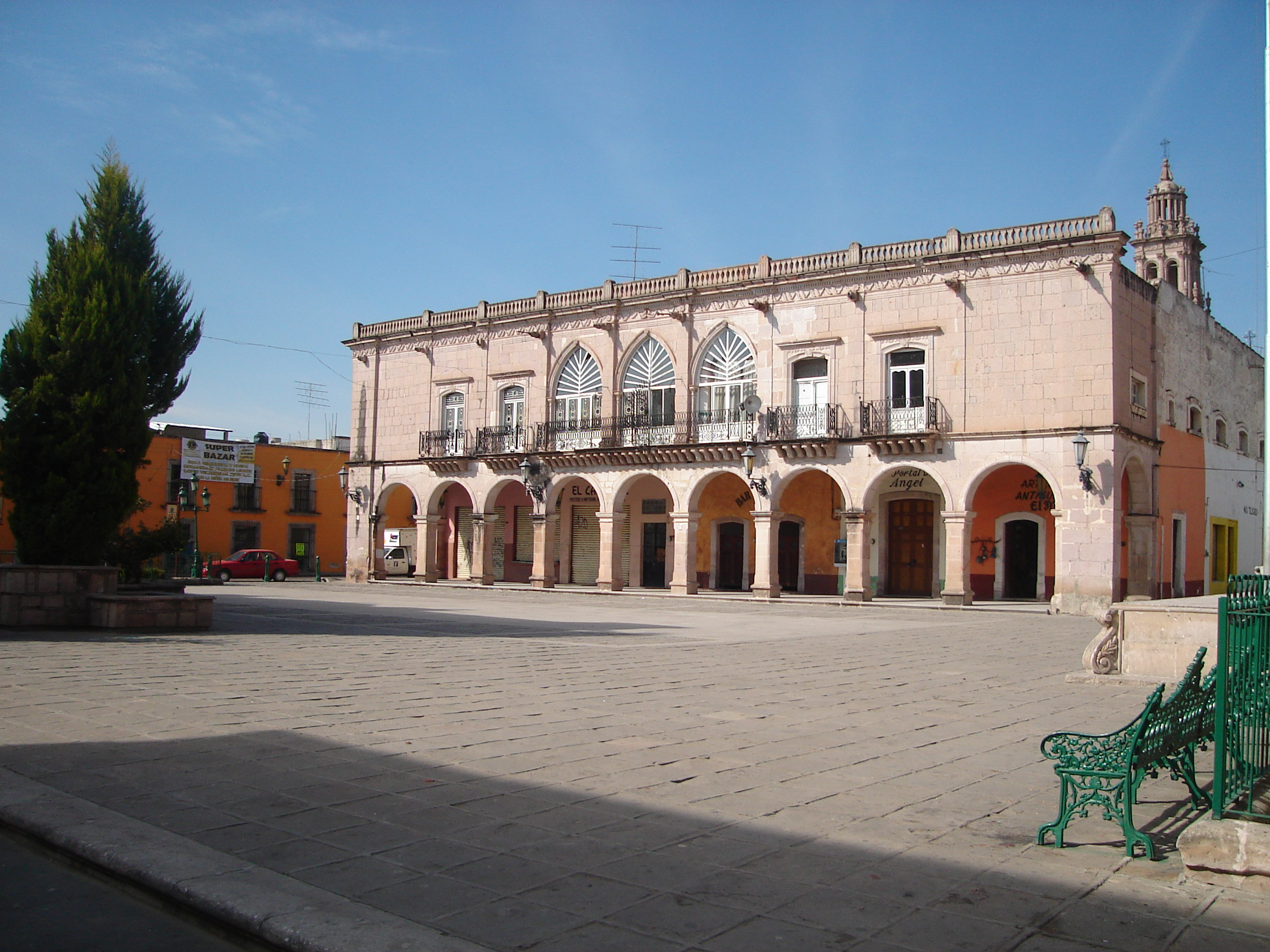
The Portal de las Palomas is home to several traditional bars, fronted by a square called Plaza Tacuba.

Located away from the town center, several other landmarks can be found. The Casa de Campesino is an 18th-century structure that once served as the home for various organizations dedicated to rural farmers. Today, it is a multi-use building. The Chapel of Nuestra Señora de los Dolores (Our Lady of Sorrow) was erected at the beginning of the 19th century. The Portal de las Palomas is home to several traditional bars, facing a square known as Plaza Tacuba. The present town market is a building featuring arches on two sides. This market offers a variety of products, including fruits, vegetables, handcrafted items, and prepared food.

Much of town life remains traditional, with businesses closing either fully or partially on Saturdays. Charrería and bullfighting are important to the heritage of the area. Charrería and bullfighting hold significant cultural importance in the area. A major tradition in the town is the Burning of Judas on Holy Saturday, which marks the beginning of the Feria de Primavera (spring festival). On this day, events such as charrería, cockfighting, and the running of the bulls take place. The day's activities are organized by the town's bar owners and attract approximately 70,000 visitors. The Feria de Primavera is a secular fair, and it's the oldest and most traditional of its kind in the state. Its origins date back to 1824 when local authorities aimed to promote the area's products, ranging from produce to yarn, minerals, and plaster. During Carnival, there is a unique tradition called Las Jerezaditas, where children run among very young (one to two years old) bulls.

== The municipality ==
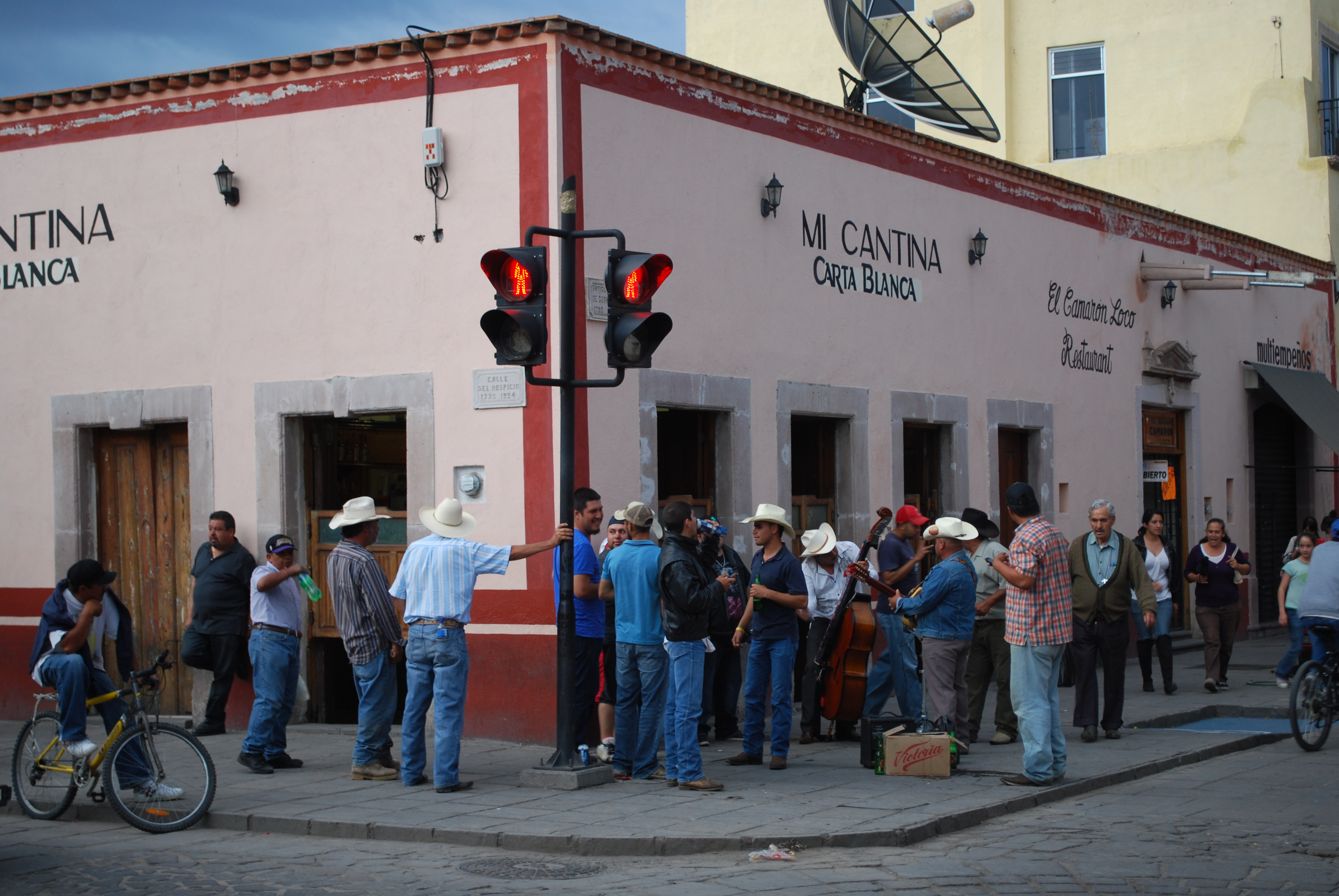
Traditional band plays in front of a bar

The town of Jerez serves as the local government for 128 other communities, encompassing an area of 1,521 km^{2} (587 sq mi). The municipality, simply referred to as Jerez, shares borders with the municipalities of Fresnillo, Calera de Víctor Rosales, Susticacán, Zacatecas, Villanueva, and Valparaíso. The largest community within the municipality is the municipal seat, which is home to half of the municipality's population. Other significant communities include Ermita de Guadalupe, Ermita de Los Correa, El Cargadero, and Santa Rita. These are predominantly rural, agricultural towns. Notably, El Cargadero is known for its population of expatriates from the United States.

The Hacienda de Ciénega belonged to the Gordoa family, one of the most influential families in Zacatecas in the 19th century. The hacienda can only be viewed from the outside. The main house and chapel feature thick walls and large, heavy wooden doors. The chapel is dedicated to Our Lady of Sorrows. The complex encompasses a spacious plaza with trees.

== Estates, haciendas, and ranches ==
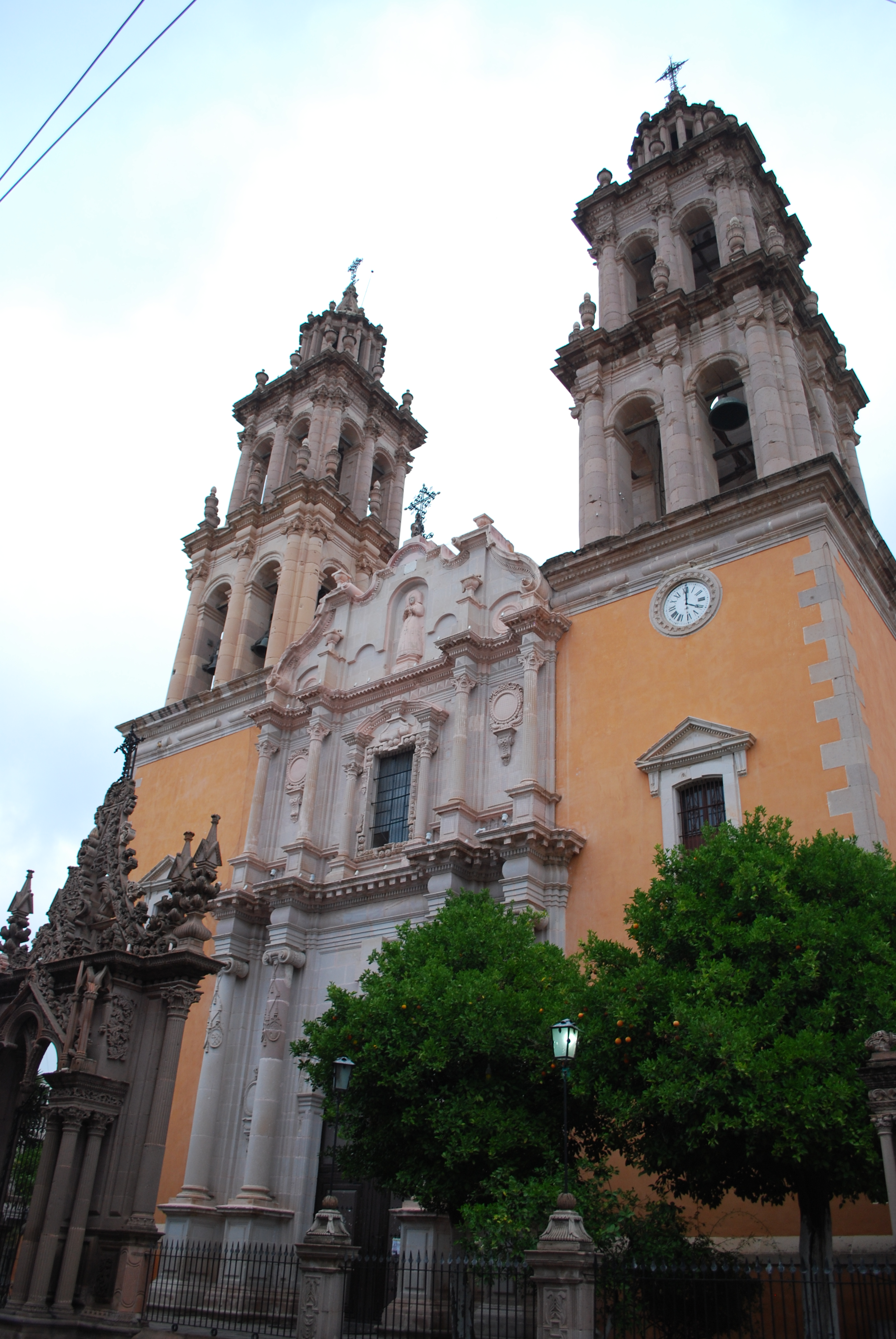
Sanctuary of Our Lady of Solitude

Name	Category	Municipality	District	Year of Earliest Record
Boca del Tesorero	Rancho	Ciudad Garcia	Jerez	
El Cargadero	Rancho	San Juan	Jerez	1746
Casa Blanca	Rancho	Ciudad Garcia	Jerez	1748
Ciénega (Grande)	Hacienda	Ciudad Garcia	Jerez	
Chorritos	Rancho	Ciudad Garcia	Jerez	
San Cayetano	Rancho	Ciudad Garcia	Jerez	
El Moral	Rancho	Ciudad Garcia	Jerez	1743
Ermita de Guadalupe	Rancho	Ciudad Garcia	Jerez	1784
Ermita de los Correa	Rancho	Ciudad Garcia	Jerez	
Gavia	Rancho	Ciudad Garcia	Jerez	1744
Hacienda de Tesorero	Hacienda	Ciudad Garcia	Jerez	
La Canada	Rancho	Ciudad Garcia	Jerez	
Colonia Briseño	Rancho	Ciudad Garcia	Jerez	
Los Garcias	Estancia	Monte Escobedo	Jerez	1770
Los Haro	Rancho	Ciudad Garcia	Jerez	1772
Huejote	Rancho	Ciudad Garcia	Jerez	
Jomulco	Rancho	San Juan	Jerez	1743
Jomulquillo	Rancho	San Juan	Jerez	
Juana Gomez	Estate	Ciudad Garcia	Jerez	
Labor del Marquez	Hacienda	Ciudad Garcia	Jerez	
Lajas	Rancho	Ciudad Garcia	Jerez	
Los Juarez	Rancho	Ciudad Garcia	Jerez	1745
Los Lirios	Rancho	Monte Escobedo	Jerez	1744
Lo de Luna	Rancho	Ciudad Garcia	Jerez	1743
Lo de Salas	Rancho	Ciudad Garcia	Jerez	
Montecillo	Rancho	Ciudad Garcia	Jerez	
Monte de Garcia	Rancho	Monte Escobedo	Jerez	1794
Los Ortizes	Rancho	San Juan	Jerez	
El Porvenir (La Tetarrona)	Rancho	Ciudad Garcia	Jerez	1730
Rio Florida(Senor de Roma)	Rancho	Ciudad Garcia	Jerez	
Los Rodartes	Rancho	Ciudad Garcia	Jerez	1770
San Rafael	Rancho	Monte Escobedo	Jerez	
Sauz de los Garcia	Rancho	Ciudad Garcia	Jerez	1746
Colonia Miguel Hidalgo	Rancho		Jerez	
El Tambor	Rancho		Jerez	
Tetillas	Rancho	Ciudad Garcia	Jerez	
Santa Rita	Rancho		Jerez	

== History ==
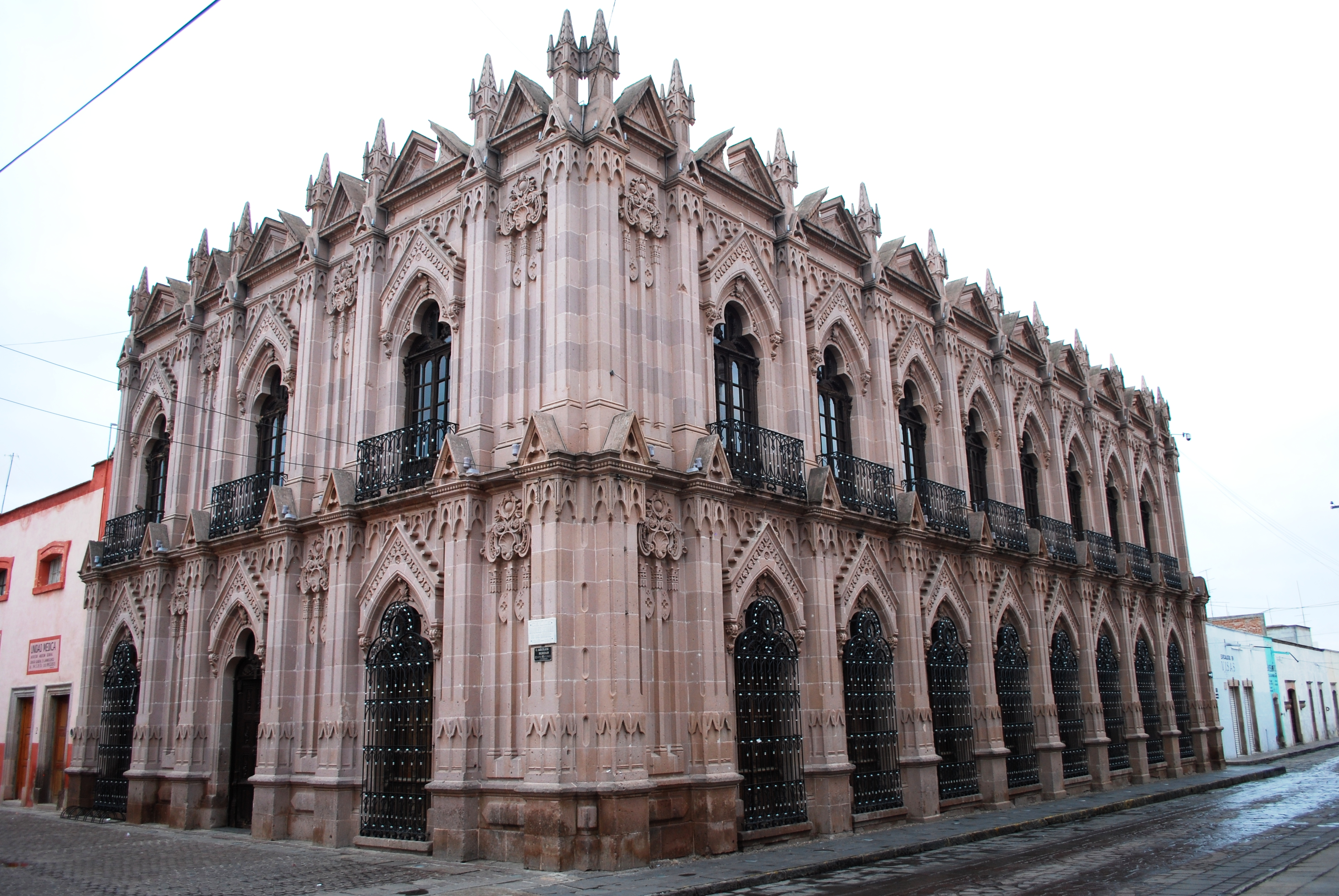
Escuela De la Torre (Tower School) currently abandoned

The area was named by the town's founders: Pedro Carrillo Dávila, Pedro Caldera, and Martín Morelos, who originally hailed from Jerez de la Frontera, Spain. The town in Zacatecas is named after its Spanish counterpart. 'Jerez' originates from the Arabic 'scherich,' which denotes an abundance of produce. The choice of this name was influenced by the fertility of the Zacatecas region and its resemblance to the founders' hometown. The addition of the town's name took place in 1952 and is a tribute to Francisco García Salinas, a local politician who played a key role in land redistribution, establishing textile mills, and opening schools. The municipality also boasts an official seal, featuring an image of Our Lady of Solitude."

Before the arrival of the Spanish, two indigenous groups dominated the region: the Guachichils and the Zacatecos. The Zacatecos spoke a language similar to Nahuatl and were engaged in agriculture.

In the 16th century, Jerez was situated on the route that Cristobal de Oñate traversed in search of gold, which he eventually discovered southwest of the city of Zacatecas. The land in this area was granted to Captain Pedro Carrillo Dávila for his role in the Conquest. He was married to the daughter of the conquistador Bernardino Vázquez De Tapia, Sancha De Belmar. Missionaries followed, working to convert the indigenous population in the area until the late 16th century. The original churches in the town were dedicated to Ildefonsus and Saint Dominic.

According to oral history, the town was founded in 1536 to protect the road between Guadalajara and Zacatecas from indigenous attacks. However, written records officially date the town's founding to 1570.

During the Mexican War of Independence, forces loyal to the Spanish Crown seized control of the town in 1811 and began executing those suspected of aiding the insurgents. This event played a decisive role in the town's subsequent support for the independence movement.

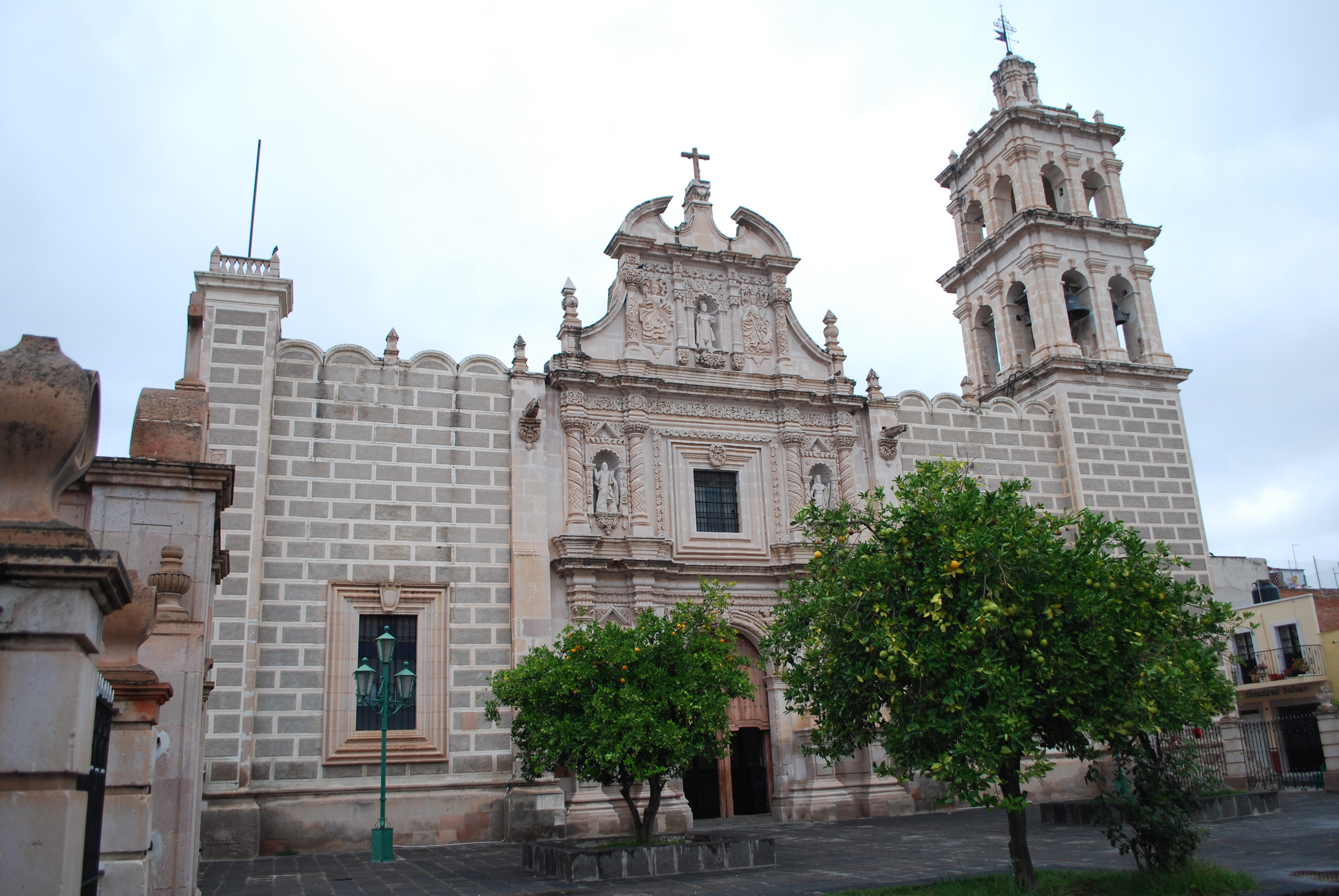
Immaculate Conception parish in Jerez, Zacatecas

According to the Commercial Directory of 1898, during the same period, the mining companies operating in Jerez were Compañía Minera La Soledad, Compañía Minera Palmira, and Compañía Minera San Luis. In this era, Jerez was home to two printing establishments, a brewery, two carriage manufacturers, a solitary hotel owned by Antonio Castellanos, two silversmiths, three flour mills, and numerous other businesses."

During the 19th century, the town and its surrounding area experienced growth and prosperity, primarily due to agriculture. The first phase of the sanctuary of Our Lady of Solitude was completed in 1819. The state's Instituto Literario was established here but later relocated to the city of Zacatecas in 1837. The Hinojosa Theater was constructed in 1869. By the late 19th and early 20th centuries, the area had a population of approximately 12,000 inhabitants. The haciendas in the vicinity of Jerez were among the most productive in the region. However, no railroads were built here to transport goods to the market; instead, they were sent to the city of Zacatecas. It was during this time that two of the town's noted artists, Ramón López Velarde (born in 1888) and Máximo Pérez Torres (born in 1899), emerged.

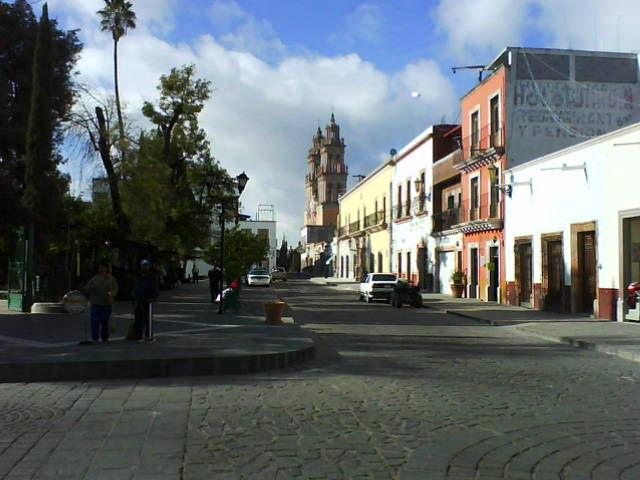
Jerez de García Salinas, Zacatecas

Just before the outbreak of the Mexican Revolution, an incident occurred here on September 15, 1910. On this date, the traditional Grito de Dolores was held to commemorate the start of the War of Independence. However, instead of shouting "Viva México," the townspeople shouted "Viva Madero," in support of the politician opposed to the ruling Porfirio Díaz. This led to political instability in the following days.

Rebels against Díaz in the area were informed of the situation and, on September 19, ambushed and killed federal troops. They also set fire to the Hinojosa Theater and the municipal building. This fire destroyed many historical records of the municipality, forcing numerous inhabitants to flee to other places as the situation deteriorated.

The city was officially taken over by troops led by Pánfilo Natera in 1913. The town survived the Revolution, but its recovery was slowed by the subsequent Cristero War. One battle of this conflict occurred near the community of Santa Fe, resulting in a victory for the Cristeros.

In 1952, the town's name was changed from simply "Jerez" to "Jerez de García Salinas," while the municipality retained the name "Jerez." The image of the Virgen de la Soledad was refurbished in 1979. The new municipal palace was inaugurated in 1983 by then-Mexican President Miguel de la Madrid. In 2001, the municipality elected its first non-Partido Revolucionario Institucional (PRI) president since the Mexican Revolution.

== Geography ==
The terrain is primarily flat, with some small hills, except for the northern edge, where you can find the Sierra de Jerez. The highest elevation in the area reaches 2,750 meters (9,020 ft) above sea level. About twenty kilometers to the west of the town center lies the Sierra de Los Cardos, where most of the municipality's natural scenery can be found. It offers rugged terrain suitable for activities such as camping, mountain biking, rock climbing, rappelling, and other sports. During the rainy season, numerous streams flow.

The primary surface water source is the Jerez River, which runs from north to south through the municipality. This river and several streams are home to five dams, including Encino Mocho and Tesorero. The Cargadero and Tesorero dams are popular for sports fishing. Additionally, the area is served by 158 wells that provide drinking water for the community and support agricultural needs.

=== Climate ===
The climate is temperate and dry, with an annual rainfall of approximately 500 mm (20 in), primarily occurring during the summer. The average annual temperature is 16 °C (61 °F).

Climate data for Jerez de García Salinas (1951–2010)
Month	Jan	Feb	Mar	Apr	May	Jun	Jul	Aug	Sep	Oct	Nov	Dec	Year
Record high °C (°F)	29.0 (84.2)	32.0 (89.6)	32.0 (89.6)	36.0 (96.8)	36.0 (96.8)	37.0 (98.6)	34.0 (93.2)	33.0 (91.4)	39.0 (102.2)	33.0 (91.4)	32.0 (89.6)	29.0 (84.2)	39.0 (102.2)
Mean daily maximum °C (°F)	22.7 (72.9)	24.0 (75.2)	26.3 (79.3)	29.0 (84.2)	30.6 (87.1)	29.9 (85.8)	27.8 (82.0)	27.6 (81.7)	26.9 (80.4)	26.3 (79.3)	25.2 (77.4)	22.9 (73.2)	26.6 (79.9)
Daily mean °C (°F)	12.7 (54.9)	14.2 (57.6)	16.0 (60.8)	18.5 (65.3)	20.8 (69.4)	21.8 (71.2)	20.8 (69.4)	20.6 (69.1)	19.8 (67.6)	17.9 (64.2)	15.5 (59.9)	13.5 (56.3)	17.7 (63.9)
Mean daily minimum °C (°F)	2.8 (37.0)	4.4 (39.9)	5.7 (42.3)	8.1 (46.6)	11.0 (51.8)	13.8 (56.8)	13.7 (56.7)	13.6 (56.5)	12.7 (54.9)	9.4 (48.9)	5.8 (42.4)	4.0 (39.2)	8.8 (47.8)
Record low °C (°F)	−7.0 (19.4)	−4.0 (24.8)	−3.0 (26.6)	−2.0 (28.4)	3.5 (38.3)	8.0 (46.4)	10.0 (50.0)	8.5 (47.3)	4.0 (39.2)	1.5 (34.7)	−3.0 (26.6)	−5.0 (23.0)	−7.0 (19.4)
Average precipitation mm (inches)	22.9 (0.90)	15.9 (0.63)	1.2 (0.05)	2.6 (0.10)	13.7 (0.54)	70.1 (2.76)	125.3 (4.93)	116.0 (4.57)	76.9 (3.03)	29.0 (1.14)	10.0 (0.39)	12.1 (0.48)	495.7 (19.52)
Average precipitation days (≥ 0.1 mm)	2.2	1.4	0.4	0.5	3.1	9.3	12.8	12.4	8.7	4.2	2.0	2.2	59.2
Source: Servicio Meteorologico Nacional

=== Flora and Fauna ===
The municipality boasts a range of wild vegetation, including holm oak, pine trees, mesquite, huizache, nopal cactus, and various types of grasses. The local wildlife predominantly comprises mammals, such as rabbits, pumas, javelinas, wildcats, coyotes, deer, and raccoons, as well as a variety of birds and reptiles.

== Socioeconomics ==
The municipality's economy is primarily centered around agriculture, including crops such as corn, beans, and animal feed. The region is renowned for its fruit orchards, specializing in the production of peaches, apples, and apricots, with approximately half of the production concentrated around the town of El Cargadero. Additionally, there is a significant dairy industry producing products like cheese.

Another important traditional economic activity in the area includes craftsmanship, featuring leather products such as saddles, boots, and especially belts, which are often embroidered with maguey fiber (piteado). Moreover, artisans craft gold and silver jewelry, particularly gold filigree half-moon earrings, in addition to working with iron, stone masonry, and pottery.

Despite its proximity to the capital, Jerez remains relatively undiscovered by most of the state's tourists. In an effort to promote tourism, the town of Jerez has joined the federal government's Pueblos Mágicos program, highlighting its traditional architecture, cultural traditions, and a rich culinary heritage, which includes dishes like mole jerezano (a mole sauce with almonds), carne de puerco en salsa verde, carne adobada, carne deshebrada (shredded beef), asado de boda, brocheta jerezana (beef tips with sausage, bacon, onion, tomatoes, and poblano chili peppers), burritos, and fruit ices.

Visitors can also enjoy attractions such as the Las Margaritas water park and the El Manantial Eco-Tourism Center, offering camping, hiking, rappelling, and well-equipped cabins for a complete outdoor experience.
