= Fernando Ramírez de Haro, 10th Marquess of Villanueva del Duero =

Spanish noble (born 1976)

Fernando Ramírez de Haro y Aguirre, 10th Marquess of Villanueva del Duero, GE (born 23 August 1976) is a Spanish aristocrat.

Born at Madrid, he is the eldest son of Fernando Ramírez de Haro, 16th Count of Bornos, Grandee of Spain, and his wife Esperanza Aguirre y Gil de Biedma, the prominent conservative politician and former President of the Community of Madrid.

On 12 April 2000, his paternal grandfather, Ignacio Ramírez de Haro, 15th Count of Bornos, ceded him the marquessate of Villanueva de Duero

== Ancestry ==
Ancestors of Fernando Ramírez de Haro, 10th Marquess of Villanueva del Duero

16. Fernando Ramírez de Haro, 13th Count of Bornos
8. Fernando Ramírez de Haro, 14th Count of Bornos
17. Inés Álvarez de Toledo, 16th Marchioness of Cazaza in Africa
4. Ignacio Ramírez de Haro, 15th Count of Bornos
18. Juan Pérez de Guzmán, 2nd Duke of T'Serclaes
9. María Dolores Pérez de Guzmán y Sanjuán
19. María Dolores Sanjuán y Garvey
2. Fernando Ramírez de Haro, 16th Count of Bornos
20. José Félix Valdés, 2nd Marquess of Casa Valdés
10. Juan Valdés, 3rd Marquess of Casa Valdés
21. Manuela Armada y de los Ríos-Enríquez
5. Beatriz Valdés, 4th Marchioness of Casa Valdés
22. Jacobo Ozores, 14th Lord of la Casa de Rubianes
11. María Teresa Ozores y Saavedra
23. Corina de Saavedra y Cueto
1. Fernando Ramírez de Haro, 10th Marquess of Villanueva de Duero
24. Moisés Aguirre
12. José Luis Aguirre y Martos
25. Mariana Martos y O'Neale
6. José Luis Aguirre y Borrell
26. Félix Borrell y Vidal
13. Esperanza Borrell y García-Lastra
27. María García-Lastra y Sáinz de la Lastra
3. Esperanza Aguirre y Gil de Biedma
28. José Gil y Becerril
14. José Gil de Biedma, 3rd Count of Sepúlveda
29. Isabel de Biedma y Oñate
7. Piedad Gil de Biedma y Vega de Seoane
30. Baldomero Vega de Seoane y Andrea-Pérez
15. María Isabel Vega de Seoane y Echevarría
31. Antonia Echevarría y Pizarro

== Notes ==
Spanish nobility
Preceded by Ignacio Ramírez de Haro	Marquess of Villanueva de Duero; 20 April 2000 –	Incumbent
