= Diego López (Argentine footballer, born 1981) =

Argentine footballer

Personal information
- Full name: Diego Martín López
- Date of birth: 2 November 1981 (age 45)
- Place of birth: Lanús, Argentina
- Height: 1.74 m (5 ft 9 in)
- Position: Midfielder

Senior career*
Years	Team	Apps	(Gls)
2000–2002	Lanús	9	(0)
2002	Defensa y Justicia	6	(0)
2004	Sportivo Luqueño	6	(1)
2007–2009	Real Arroyo Seco	47	(2)
2009–2011	9 de Julio	42	(4)
2011–2012	Santamarina	15	(0)
2012–2013	Flandria	6	(0)
Total		131	(7)
- * Club domestic league appearances and goals

Diego Martín López (born 2 November 1981) is an Argentine former professional footballer who played as a midfielder.

== Career ==
Lanús were López's first senior club, with the midfielder appearing nine times for them in the Argentine Primera División between 2000 and 2002. A move to Defensa y Justicia of Primera B Nacional followed, along with six appearances. In 2004, López switched Argentina for Paraguay by agreeing to join Sportivo Luqueño. He scored his first senior league goal for the Paraguayans, it arrived during a 6–1 defeat to Libertad on 24 March. Three years later, Torneo Argentino A side Real Arroyo Seco signed López. Two goals in forty-seven matches occurred, one of which came against 9 de Julio who became his fifth club in August 2009.

After two campaigns in the third tier with 9 de Julio, which brought goals versus Ben Hur, Unión Sunchales, Rivadavia and Juventud Antoniana, López departed to sign for fellow Torneo Argentino A team Santamarina. On 5 July 2012, López moved to Primera B Metropolitana's Flandria. He made his debut in a 4–0 loss at the hands of Temperley on 5 August. Five more appearances followed, prior to López retiring.

== Career statistics ==
Appearances and goals by club, season and competition
Club	Season	League			Cup		Continental		Other		Total	
Club	Season	Division	Apps	Goals	Apps	Goals	Apps	Goals	Apps	Goals	Apps	Goals
Defensa y Justicia	2002–03	Primera B Nacional	6	0	0	0	—		0	0	6	0
Sportivo Luqueño	2004	Primera División	6	1	0	0	—		0	0	6	1
Santamarina	2011–12	Torneo Argentino A	15	0	0	0	—		0	0	15	0
Flandria	2012–13	Primera B Metropolitana	6	0	0	0	—		0	0	6	0
Career total			33	1	0	0	—		0	0	33	1
