= María Díaz de Haro =

María Díaz de Haro may refer to:

- María Díaz de Haro, daughter of Diego López II de Haro, wife of count Gonzalo Núñez de Lara
- María Díaz I de Haro (1270-1342), Lady of Biscay, daughter of Lope Díaz III de Haro, wife of John of Castile
- María Díaz II de Haro (1318/1320-1348), Lady of Biscay, daughter of Juan de Castilla y Haro, wife of Juan Núñez III de Lara
