= Diego López (footballer, born 1995) =

Paraguayan footballer

Personal information
- Full name: Diego Eduardo López
- Date of birth: 11 May 1995 (age 31)
- Place of birth: Paraguay
- Position: Midfielder

Senior career*
Years	Team	Apps	(Gls)
2013–2014	Cerro Porteño	2	(0)
2014	Olimpia	0	(0)
- * Club domestic league appearances and goals

Diego Eduardo López (born 11 May 1995) is a Paraguayan professional footballer who plays as a midfielder.

== Club career ==
López's career got underway with Cerro Porteño. He began featuring for the club during the 2013 Primera División season, making his professional debut on 2 December 2013 as Cerro Porteño lost 2–7 on home soil to Olimpia; he was substituted on after seventy-two minutes in place of Elías Moreira. López started and finished a 6–0 loss away to Guaraní days later. On 31 August 2014, López completed a move to Olimpia.

== International career ==
In June 2014, López was called up by the Paraguay U20s.

== Career statistics ==
As of 10 July 2020.

Club statistics
Club	Season	League			Cup		Continental		Other		Total	
Club	Season	Division	Apps	Goals	Apps	Goals	Apps	Goals	Apps	Goals	Apps	Goals
Cerro Porteño	2013	Primera División	2	0	—		—		0	0	2	0
Olimpia	2014	Primera División	0	0	—		—		0	0	0	0
Career total			2	0	—		—		0	0	2	0
