= Villanueva de Duero =

Coordinates: 41°31′N 4°52′W

Villanueva de Duero, Spain
- Flag Coat of arms

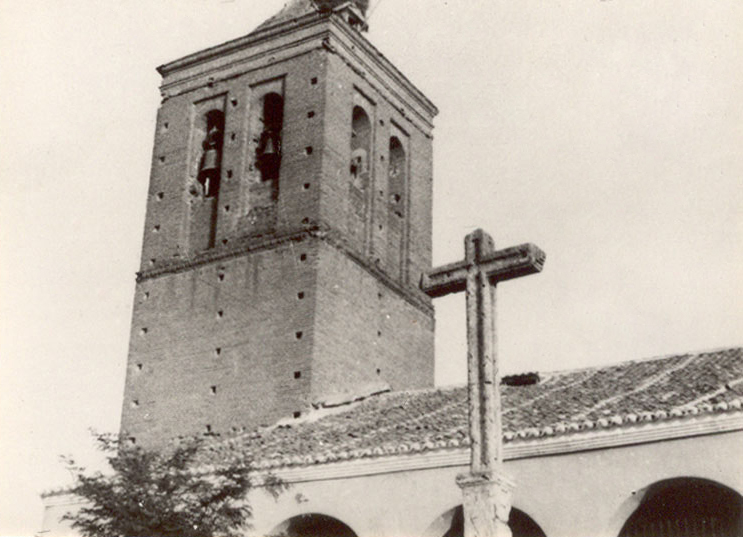
- Church
- Country: Spain
- Autonomous community: Castile and León
- Province: Valladolid
- Municipality: Villanueva de Duero

Area
  - Total: 37.29 km^{2} (14.40 sq mi)
- Elevation: 694 m (2,277 ft)

Population (2025-01-01)
  - Total: 1,263
  - Density: 33.87/km^{2} (87.72/sq mi)
- Time zone: UTC+1 (CET)
  - Summer (DST): UTC+2 (CEST)

Villanueva de Duero is a municipality located in the province of Valladolid, Castile and León, Spain. According to the 2004 census (INE), the municipality had a population of 1,067 inhabitants.
