= Fernando Ramírez de Haro, 16th Count of Bornos =

Spanish noble

Fernando Ramírez de Haro y Valdés, 16th Count of Bornos, 15th Count of Murillo, GE, RMCS (b. 17 December 1949) is a Spanish nobleman and landowner, a former president of Real Club de la Puerta de Hierro. Born in Madrid, Bornos is the elder son of the late Ignacio Ramírez de Haro, 15th Count of Bornos, Grandee of Spain (1918–2010), and his wife Beatriz Valdés, 4th Marchioness of Casa Valdés. On 5 November 1975, his father ceded him the Countship of Murillo.

== Family ==
He married, on 1 September 1974, Esperanza Aguirre y Gil de Biedma, prominent politician and former President of the Community of Madrid, eldest daughter of José Luis Aguirre y Borrel and Piedad Gil de Biedma y Vega de Seoane, daughter of the 3rd Count of Sepúlveda. They have two sons:

- Don Fernando Ramírez de Haro, 10th Marquess of Villanueva del Duero, Grandee of Spain, (b. 23 August 1976).
- Don Álvaro Ramírez de Haro, 16th Count of Villariezo, (b. 4 April 1980).

== Ancestry ==
Ancestors of Fernando Ramírez de Haro, 16th Count of Bornos

8. Fernando Ramírez de Haro, 13th Count of Bornos
4. Fernando Ramírez de Haro, 14th Count of Bornos
9. Inés Álvarez de Toledo, 16th Marchioness of Cazaza in Africa
2. Ignacio Ramírez de Haro, 15th Count of Bornos
10. Juan Pérez de Guzmán, 2nd Duke of T'Serclaes
5. María Dolores Pérez de Guzmán y Sanjuán
11. María Dolores Sanjuán y Garvey
1. Fernando Ramírez de Haro, 15th Count of Murillo
12. José Félix Valdés, 2nd Marquess of Casa Valdés
6. Juan Valdés, 3rd Marquess of Casa Valdés
13. Manuela Armada y de los Ríos-Enríquez
3. Beatriz Valdés, 4th Marchioness of Casa Valdés
14. Jacobo Ozores, 14th Lord of la Casa de Rubianes
7. María Teresa Ozores y Saavedra
15. Corina de Saavedra y Cueto

== See also ==
- Count of Bornos

== Sources ==
- Elenco de Grandezas y Títulos Nobiliarios Españoles, Hidalguía Editions, 2008

Spanish nobility
Preceded by Ignacio Ramírez de Haro	Count of Murillo; 5 November 1975 – 26 April 2012	Succeeded by Beatriz Ramírez de Haro
Preceded by Ignacio Ramírez de Haro	Count of Bornos; 25 February 2013 –	Incumbent
