= Colotlán River =

Location
- Country: Mexico

Physical characteristics
- Mouth
  - location: Bolaños River

The Colotlán River is a river of Mexico. It is a tributary of the Bolaños River, which is part of the Río Grande de Santiago system.

== See also ==
- List of rivers of Mexico
