= Ignacio Ramírez de Haro, 15th Count of Bornos =

Don Ignacio Fernando Ramírez de Haro y Pérez de Guzmán, 15th Count of Bornos, G.d.E (20 September 1918 – 24 October 2010), born at San Sebastián, Guipúzcoa, was a Spanish nobleman and the husband of Beatriz Valdés, 4th Marchioness of Casa Valdés.

Ignacio Ramírez de Haro, 15th Count of Bornos and 3rd Marquess of Cazaza in Africa and his wife Beatriz Valdés y Ozores had six children, including Fernando Ramírez de Haro, 16th Count of Bornos and 15th Count of Murillo, who married in 1974 Esperanza Aguirre, a Spanish politician and former President of Madrid. His grandson is Fernando Ramírez de Haro, 10th Marquis of Villanueva de Duero.

He died of legionella at the Hospital Fundación Jiménez Díaz in Madrid on 24 October 2010, aged 92. Ramirez de Haro was buried in the family cemetery in the municipality of Yebes, in the Province of Guadalajara.

== Ancestry ==
Ancestors of Ignacio Ramírez de Haro, 15th Count of Bornos

16. José Ramírez de Haro, 10th Count of Bornos
8. Fernando Ramírez de Haro, 9th Count of Villariezo
17. María de la Asunción Bellvís de Moncada y Rojas
4. Fernando Ramírez de Haro, 13th Count of Bornos
18. Luis Patiño, 5th Marquis of Castelar
9. María del Patrocinio Patiño y Osorio
19. María del Patrocino Osorio y Zayas
2. Fernando Ramírez de Haro, 14th Count of Bornos
20. Pedro de Alcántara Álvarez de Toledo, 17th Duke of Medina Sidonia
10. José Joaquín Álvarez de Toledo, 18th Duke of Medina Sidonia
21. María Joaquina de Silva y Téllez-Girón
5. Inés Álvarez de Toledo, 16th Marchioness of Cazaza in Africa
22. Pedro Caro, 4th Marquis of la Romana
11. Rosalía Caro y Álvarez de Toledo
23. María Tomasa Álvarez de Toledo y Palafox
1. Ignacio Ramírez de Haro, 15th Count of Bornos
24. Francisco Javier Pérez de Guzmán y Ruiz de Castro
12. José María Pérez de Guzmán, 1st Duke of Tserclaes
25. María Asunción de Liano y Alor
6. Juan Pérez de Guzmán, 2nd Duke of Tserclaes
26. Jerónimo Rabael Boza y Saravia
13. María de las Mercedes Boza y Auberade
27. María de Europa de Auberade y Pérez de Quiñones
3. María Dolores Pérez de Guzmán y Sanjuán
14. Ramón Sanjuán e Irigoyen
7. María Dolores Sanjuán y Garvey
30. Patricio Garvey y Gómez
15. María de los Ángeles Garvey, 1st Marchioness of San Juan
31. María de los Ángeles Capdepón y Lacoste

== Titles and styles ==
=== Titles ===
- 15th Count of Bornos, Grandee of Spain
- 14th Count of Murillo, Grandee of Spain -Ceded to his son Don Fernando
- 9th Marquess of Villanueva del Duero, Grandee of Spain -Ceded to his grandson Don Fernando
- 18th Marquess of Cazaza in Africa -Ceded to his son Don Ignacio
- 15th Count of Villariezo -Ceded to his grandson Don Álvaro
- 12th Count of Montenuevo -Ceded to his son Don Juan

=== Styles ===
- The Most Illustrious Don Ignacio Ramírez de Haro y Pérez de Guzmán (1918–1952)
- The Most Excellent The Marquis of Villanueva del Duero (1952–1973)
- The Most Excellent The Count of Bornos (1973–2010)
