= The Kiss of Death (photograph) =

1957 black and white photograph

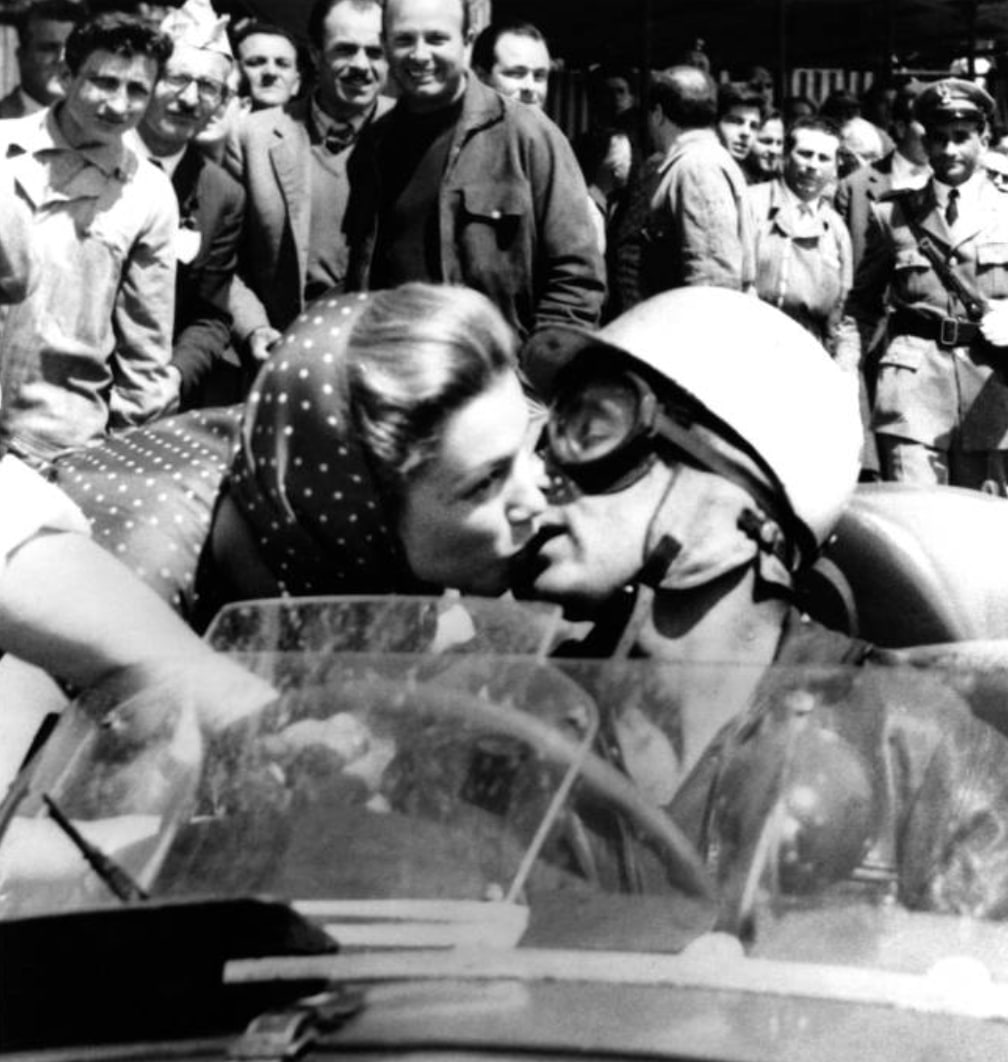
The Kiss of Death, Rome, 12 May 1957.

The Kiss of Death (Italian: Il Bacio della Morte), also known as The Last Kiss (Italian: L'Ultimo Bacio), is a black and white photograph by an unknown author, taken on 12 May 1957 in Rome. It depicts the moment in which Linda Christian kisses Alfonso de Portago at a brief pit stop during the 1957 Mille Miglia Brescia–Rome–Brescia road race in northern Italy. Portago was killed hours later when a tire burst at 150 miles per hour (240 km/h) on the last leg from Mantua to Brescia when approaching Guidizzolo. Over the years, it has become one of the most renowned photographs of kisses and a symbol of young audacity and passion.

The photograph depicts actress Linda Christian (wearing a dotted dress and headscarf), leaning in for a short kiss with Ferrari driver Alfonso de Portago who wears the typical 1950's Formula 1 racing gear; a white helmet, goggles and a leather jacket. A crowd of onlookers joyfully stares, while journalists immortalise the scene with their cameras. The photograph became famous in Italy and was popularly named "Il Bacio della Morte" (The Kiss of Death) in reference to Portago's death shortly after the image was taken. The image was published in newspapers in the days following the race. Life magazine gave fame to the photograph after it published it in its May 27 issue, under the title "Death finally takes a man who courted it".

In later interviews, Linda Christian remembered the moment almost like a premonition:

I had a strange sensation with that kiss. It was cold, and it caused me to look for the first time at Nelson seated behind him. He seemed to be like a mummy, gray, ashen, as if mesmerised. He had the eyes of someone who had suffered an enormous shock.

The image is part of the Bettmann Archive, stored in the Iron Mountain National Underground Storage Facility, a former limestone quarry located 220 feet (67 m) below ground in western Pennsylvania.

== See also ==
- Il bacio (Hayez)
