= Alfonso de Portago =

Spanish aristocrat and racing driver (1928–1957)

The Marquess of Portago
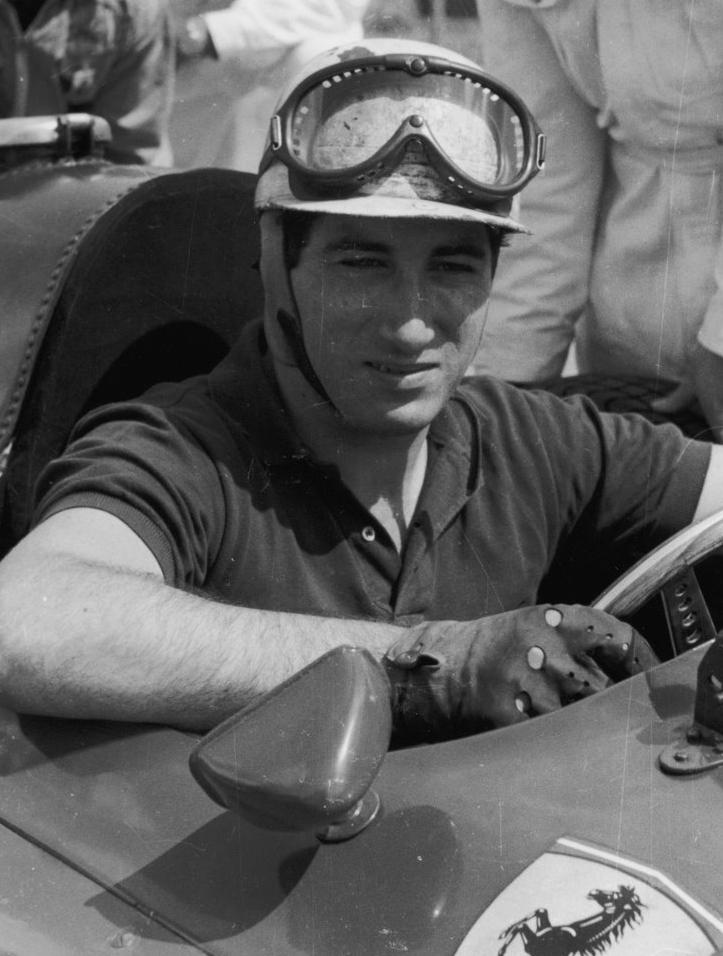
- Portago aboard his Ferrari 860 Monza, 1957
- Born: Alfonso Antonio Vicente Eduardo Ángel Blas Francisco de Borja Cabeza de Vaca y Leighton; 11 October 1928; London, England
- Died: 12 May 1957 (aged 28); Cavriana, Lombardy, Italy

Formula One World Championship career
- Nationality: (Spain) Spanish
- Active years: 1956 – 1957
- Team: Ferrari
- Entries: 5
- Championships: 0
- Wins: 0
- Podiums: 1
- Career points: 4
- Pole positions: 0
- Fastest laps: 0
- First entry: 1956 French Grand Prix
- Last entry: 1957 Argentine Grand Prix

Medal record

Bobsleigh

Representing Spain

World Championships
Bronze medal – third place	1957 St. Moritz	Two-man

Alfonso Cabeza de Vaca y Leighton, 11th Marquess of Portago, GE (11 October 1928 – 12 May 1957), best known as Alfonso de Portago, was a Spanish aristocrat, racing and bobsleigh driver, jockey and pilot.

Born in London to a prominent family in the peerage of Spain, Portago was named after his godfather, King Alfonso XIII. His grandfather, the 9th Marquess of Portago, had been Minister of Public Instruction and Fine Arts and Mayor of Madrid, while his father, who was President of Puerta de Hierro and a prolific golfer, died of a heart attack while showering after a polo match. His mother, Olga Leighton, was an Irish nurse.

At the age of 17, Portago began displaying his flamboyant lifestyle by winning a $500 bet after flying a borrowed plane under London Tower Bridge. He twice rode the Grand National as "gentleman rider" and formed the first Spanish bobsleigh team with his cousins, finishing fourth in the 1956 Winter Olympics, missing the bronze medal by 0.16 seconds.

In 1953, Portago was introduced into the Scuderia Ferrari team, competing at the Carrera Panamericana, 1000 km Buenos Aires and several Grand Prix, including a win and second place at the 1956 Tour de France Automobile and 1956 British Grand Prix respectively.

Portago’s promising career was cut short in May 1957 after his renowned Ferrari 335 S crashed near the village of Guidizzolo when a tyre burst while driving along a dead straight road at 150 mph (240 km/h) in the 1957 running of the Mille Miglia, killing Portago, his navigator, and nine spectators. The young age of the marquess, who was 28 at the time of his death, combined with his status as a sex symbol, caused a shock amongst many. Several tributes and landmarks were named after him, most notably the "Portago curve" at Jarama racetrack.

The Marquess of Portago was seen by many as a true playboy of his time; "a tall, handsome and wealthy Spanish aristocrat who captured everybody's imagination". Gregor Grant famously said of him: "a man like Portago appears only once in a generation, and it would probably be more accurate to say only once in a lifetime. The fellow does everything fabulously well. Never mind the driving, the steeplechasing, the bobsledding, the athletic side of things, never mind being fluent in 4 languages. (...) He could be the best bridge player in the world if he cared to try, he could certainly be a great soldier, and I suspect he could be a fine writer".

== Biography ==
=== Early life ===
Portago was born in London, and lived between Madrid and Biarritz. He became articulate in four languages, and spoke English with a distinctive British accent. Portago was heir to a respected title in Spain and a millionaire.

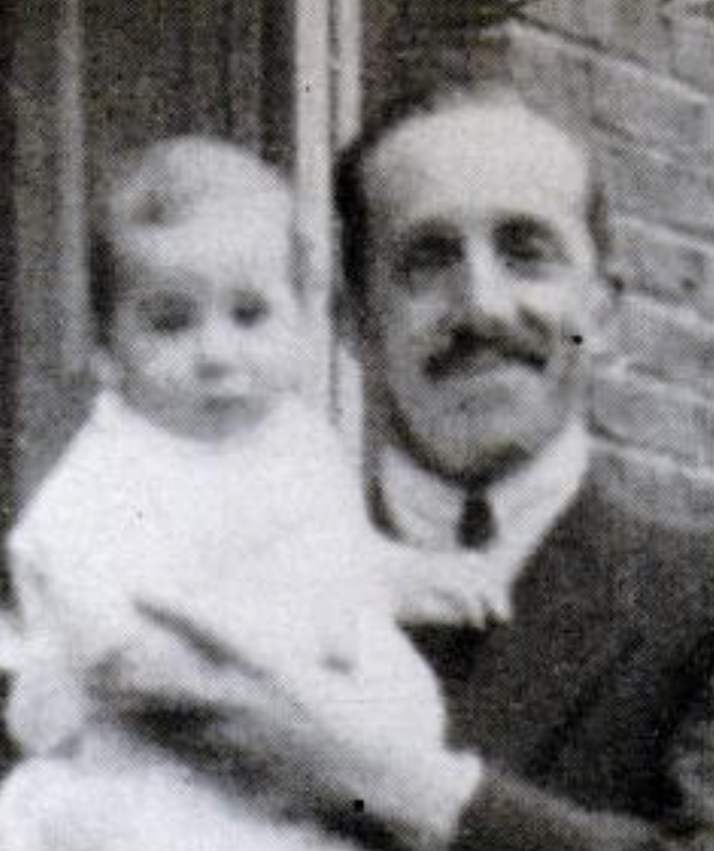
A one-year-old Alfonso being held by his namesake godfather king Alfonso XIII, ca. 1929

Among his ancestors were explorer Álvar Núñez Cabeza de Vaca. His father was Antonio Cabeza de Vaca y Carvajal, 10th Marquess of Portago, who died during half time at a polo match at a young age. His paternal grandfather was Vicente Cabeza de Vaca y Fernández de Córdoba, 9th Marquess of Portago, Minister of Public Instruction & Fine Arts and Mayor of Madrid. His mother, named Olga Beatrice Leighton, came from an Irish family and was a former nurse, and widow of American financier Frank MacKey. She also had a daughter named Sol [for Soledad], who married and became known as the (5th) Marchioness of Moratalla in racing circles. She died in 2017. Olga's first husband, Frank MacKey, who was more than 40 years older than she was, shot himself while terminally ill and left Olga an enormous fortune ($500 million) made as founder of Household Finance Corp. Portago was a first cousin of Vicente Sartorius, 4th Marquess of Mariño as well as José Luis de Vilallonga, 9th Marquess of Castellbell.

Portago was dark-haired and had freckles and blue eyes. He was 1.83 m (6 ft) tall and weighed 77 kg (170 Ibs). He famously won a bet at the age of 17 when he flew his plane beneath London Tower Bridge. He participated twice in the Grand National Steeplechase at Aintree as a gentleman jockey, although he found keeping his weight down to be a struggle.

=== Race car driver ===
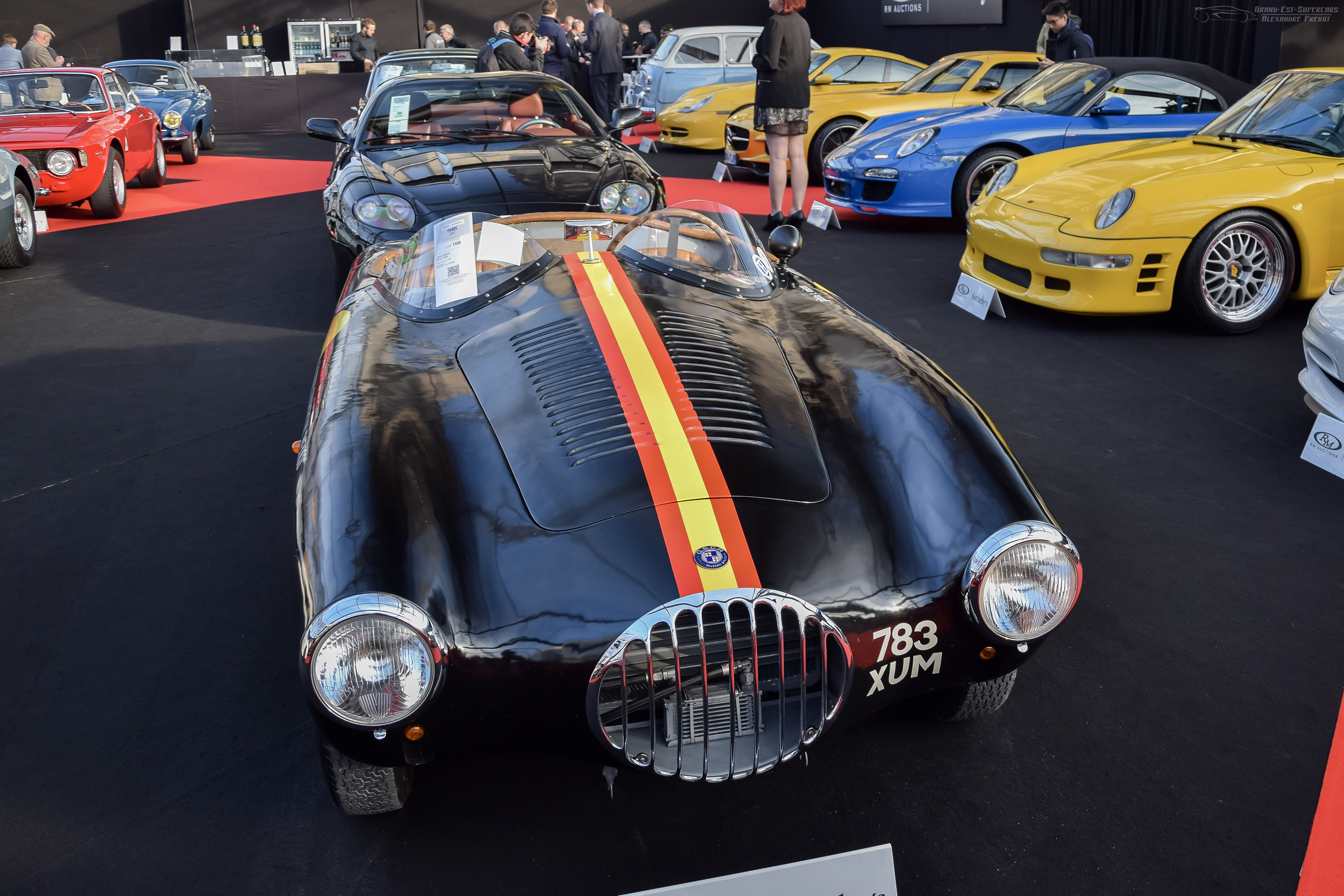
Portago's iconic Maserati Osca MT4, driven during the 1954 24 Hours of Le Mans

Portago began racing sports cars in 1953 after his meeting with the Ferrari importer in the USA, Luigi Chinetti, who asked him to be his co-driver in the Carrera Panamericana. He later raced alone in a personal Ferrari Sport model at the 1954 1000 km Buenos Aires. Portago won six major races, including the Tour de France automobile race, the Grand Prix of Oporto, and the Nassau Governor's Cup (twice). In Nassau, during the winter of 1956, Portago trailed the car ahead of him by centimeters while travelling at 240 km/h. Portago used his skill to avert careening into a crowd after the driver ahead of him touched his brakes and both cars went into a 180 m skid. Among sports car enthusiasts, Portago was known as a two-car man, because of the many burned-out brakes, clutches, transmissions, and wrecked cars for which he was responsible. He often needed several cars to finish a race.

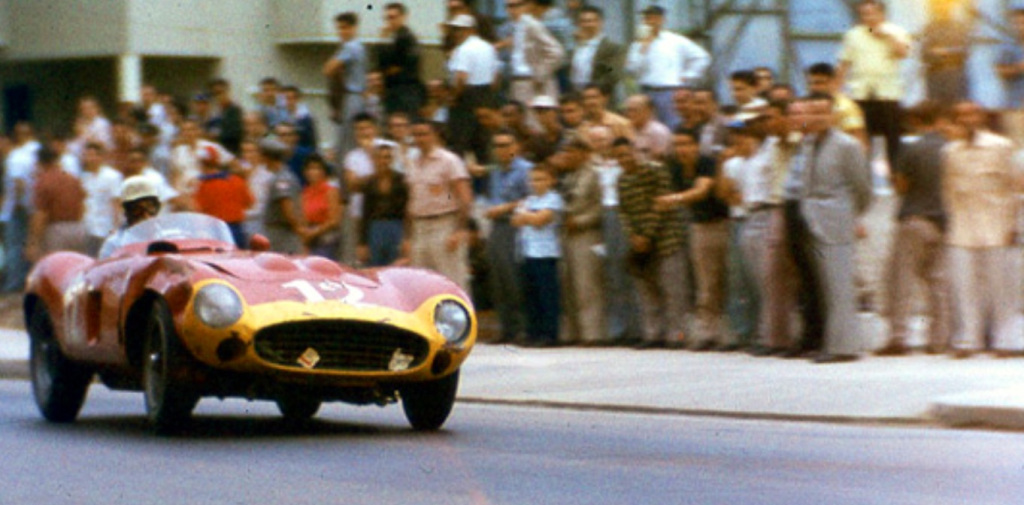
#12 Alfonso de Portago during the 1957 Cuban Grand Prix in Havana

He participated in five World Championship Formula One Grands Prix, debuting on 1 July 1956. His best result was a second place at the 1956 British Grand Prix (a shared drive with Peter Collins), and scored a total of four championship points. In 1953 he raced with Chinetti in the Carrera Panamericana. During a sprint at Silverstone in 1955, Portago was thrown from his Ferrari while racing at 140 km/h after losing control on a patch of oil. He was hospitalized with a broken leg.

=== Bobsleigh ===
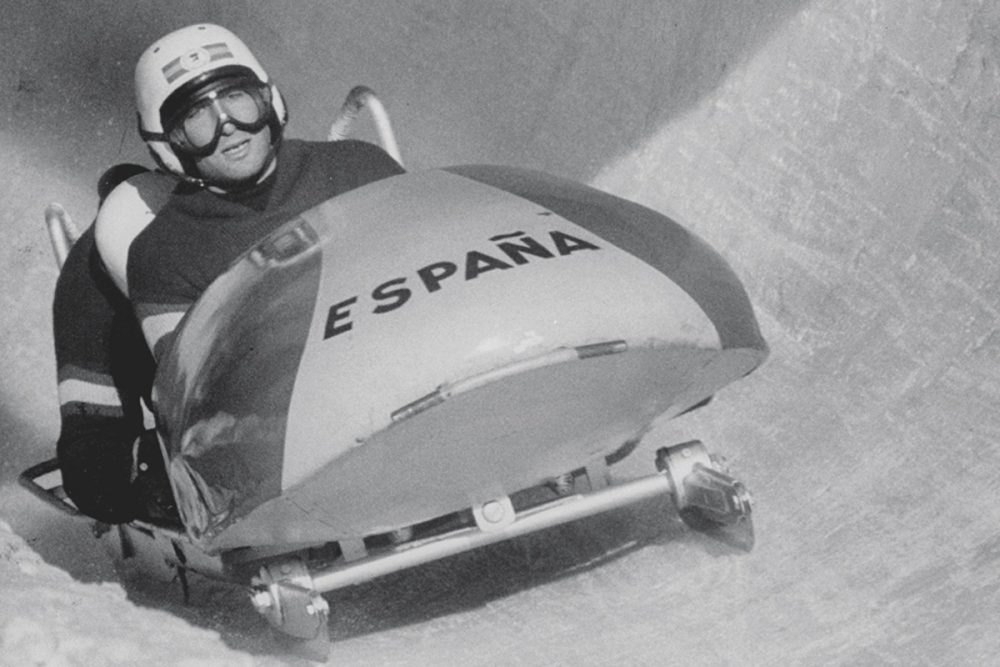
Portago at the 1956 Winter Olympics, where he missed bronze by 0.16 seconds

He also was a bobsleigh runner, recruiting several cousins in order to form Spain's first bobsleigh team for the 1956 Winter Olympic Games in Cortina d'Ampezzo. He had had only two or three practice runs in Switzerland before buying a pair of sleds. With Portago steering, the two-man bob finished fourth to the surprise of the traditional teams, missing out on a medal by 0.16 seconds. He was introduced to bobsledding by an American from Beloit, Wisconsin, Edmund Nelson, whom he later teamed up with in order to win the Tour de France automobile race.

Portago also won a bronze medal in the two-man event at the 1957 FIBT World Championships in St. Moritz.

=== Death ===
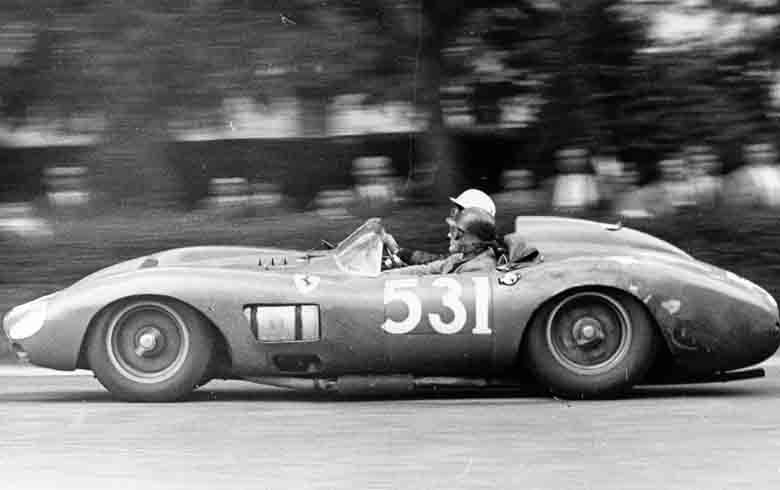
Portago and Nelson aboard the Ferrari 335 S at the Mille Miglia, 1957

He and his co-driver Edmund Nelson (1916-1957) were killed on 12 May 1957 in a crash during that year's Mille Miglia, in a straight road section between Cerlongo and Guidizzolo, in the communal territory of Cavriana about 70 km from Brescia, the start and finish point of the event race. The wreck also claimed the lives of nine spectators, among them five children. Portago was apprehensive about competing in the Mille Miglia, a race he considered too dangerous, as he was concerned about the almost complete impossibility of knowing every corner (even with a navigator) and every possible road condition over 1,000 mi (1,600 km) of open public roads with very limited information on what to expect in the race. A tire blew on Portago's third-place Ferrari 335 S causing it to spin into the crowd lining the highway. He was travelling at 240 km/h (150 mph). The 335 hurtled over a canal on the left side of the road, then veered back across the canal, causing the deaths of nine onlookers in total. Two of the dead children were hit by a concrete highway milestone that was ripped from the ground by Portago's car and thrown into the crowd. The bodies of Portago and Nelson were badly disfigured with Portago's body being found underneath his own Ferrari, severed in two. A photograph dubbed "The Kiss of Death" shows Portago kissing actress Linda Christian at a stop just before his fatal crash.

Once Portago commented, "I won't die in an accident. I'll die of old age or be executed in some gross miscarriage of justice". Nelson countered this assertion, saying Portago would not live to be 30. According to Nelson, "every time Portago comes in from a race the front of his car is wrinkled where he has been nudging people out of the way at 130 mph (210 km/h)".

== Legacy ==
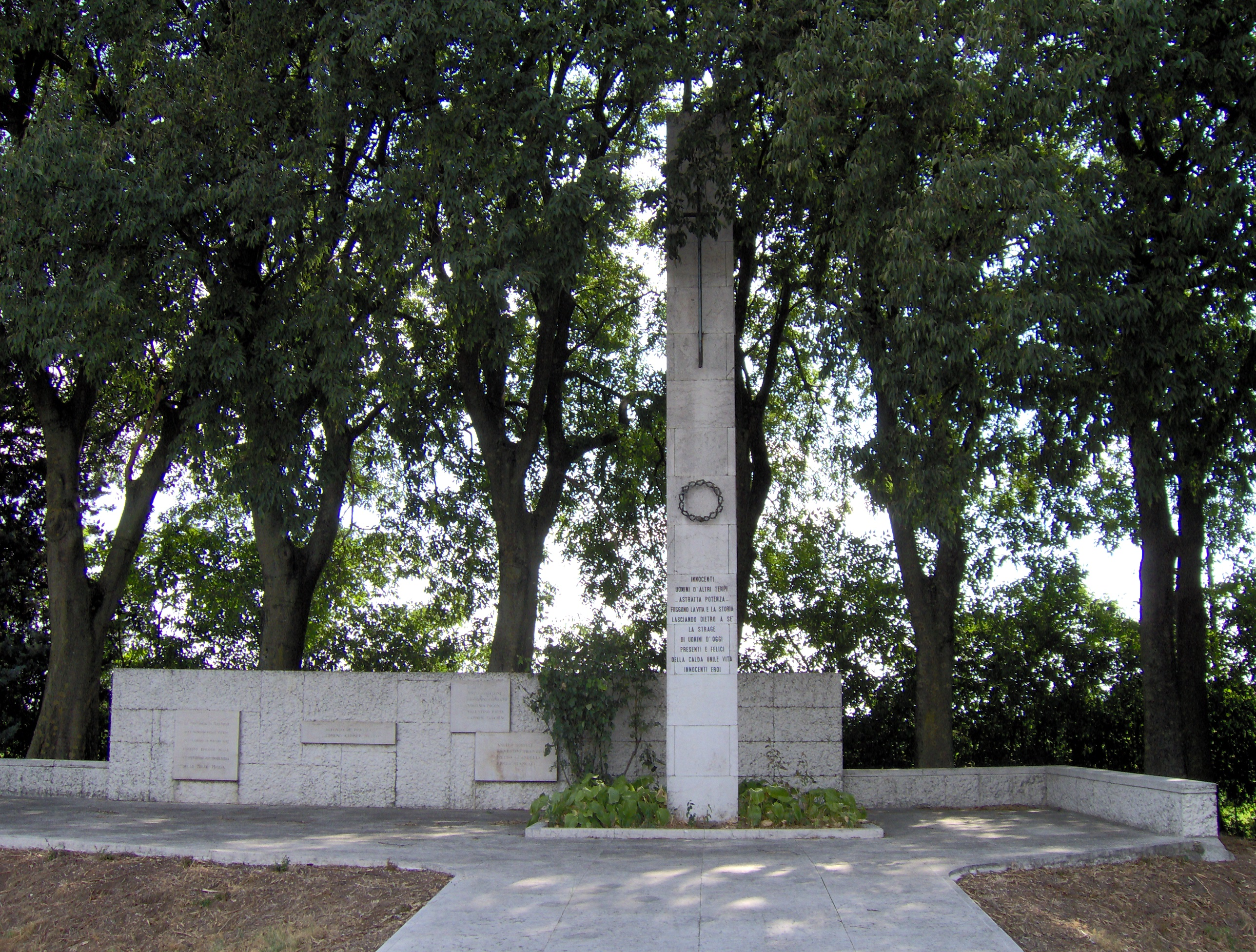
Memorial to victims of Mille Miglia at de Portago's fatal crash location, in Cavriana

The Portago curve at the St. Moritz-Celerina Olympic Bobrun is named in his honor for his foundation's efforts to renovate the lower portion of the track. A Portago curve (#9) is also shown on the Jarama motor racing circuit in Spain.

== Personal life ==
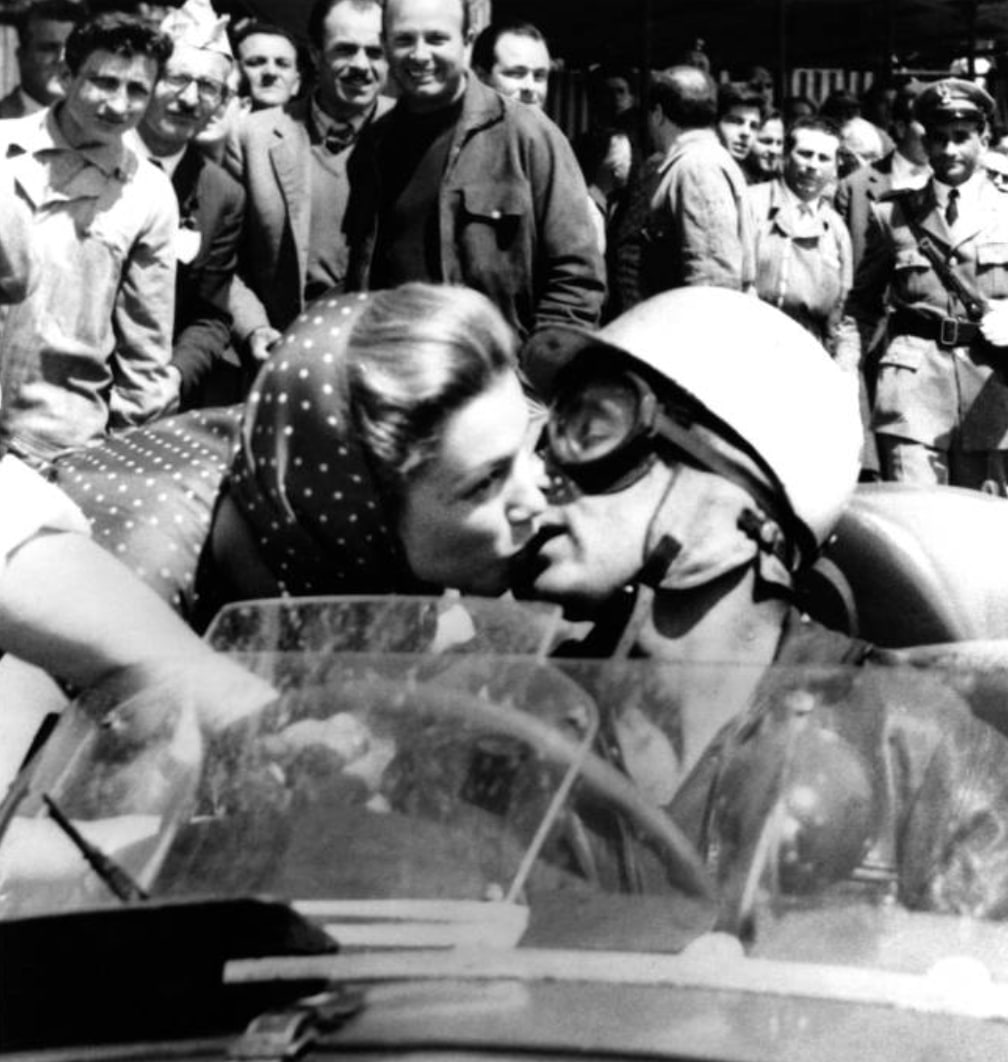
The Kiss of Death, 1957

In 1949, when he was only twenty, Portago married American former model Carroll McDaniel (by whom he had two children). McDaniel was several years older than Portago and they barely knew each other. She subsequently married the philanthropist Milton Petrie. One of Portago's daughters is photographer Andrea Portago, who was on the June 1977 cover of Andy Warhol's Interview magazine. His son, Anthony (1954–1990), was a stockbroker who married in 1973 (and divorced in 1978) Sorbonne-educated society fundraiser and costume and set designer Barbara de Portago (née Schlubach), daughter of German financier Henrik Schlubach, partner in Schlubach Exporting and Importing Company in Hamburg. Barbara's mother Florence van der Kemp (née Harris), was president of the Versailles-Claude Monet Foundation in New York and daughter of the late Rear Admiral Frederic R. Harris, of Washington and New York. Her stepfather, Gérald van der Kemp, was a curator who restored the Palace of Versailles. Barbara de Portago subsequently married, in 1984, actor and playwright Jason Harrison Grant; after their divorce she married in 1991 (divorced 1994) investment banker William James Tapert.

Supposedly, Carroll McDaniel and Alfonso de Portago were in the process of getting a divorce so he could legitimize his invalid Mexican marriage to fashion model Dorian Leigh (who had already aborted their first pregnancy in 1954 and then gave birth to their son Kim on 27 September 1955). Leigh was eleven years his senior. However, Portago was also dating actress Linda Christian, actor Tyrone Power's ex-wife.

== Complete Formula One World Championship results ==
(key)

Year	Entrant	Chassis	Engine	1	2	3	4	5	6	7	8	WDC	Points
1956	Scuderia Ferrari	Ferrari D50	Ferrari V8	ARG	MON	500	BEL	FRA; Ret	GBR; 2 †	GER; Ret	ITA; Ret	15th	3
1957	Scuderia Ferrari	Ferrari D50A	Ferrari V8	ARG; 5 *	MON	500	FRA	GBR	GER	PES	ITA	20th	1

† Indicates shared drive with Peter Collins
* Indicates shared drive with José Froilán González

== Titles ==
- 11th Marquess of Portago
  - Grandee of Spain
- 13th Count of la Mejorada

== Heraldry ==
Heraldry of Alfonso de Portago

Coat of Arms as Marquess of Portago (1943-1957)

== In popular culture ==
=== Film ===
- Brazilian actor Gabriel Leone portrayed Portago in the 2023 biopic Ferrari.

== See also ==
- Scuderia Ferrari

== Bibliography ==
- Dolcini, Carlo (2011-09-15). Alfonso de Portago. L'ultima corsa. Silea. ISBN 978-88-7911-532-2.
- McDonough, Edward (2006). Marqués de Portago: La Leyenda. Mercian Manuals Ltd. ISBN 978-19-03088-27-2.
- Wallechinsky, David (1984). "Bobsled: Two-man". The Complete Book of the Olympics: 1896 – 1980. New York: Penguin Books. p. 558.
