= Marquess of Moratalla =

Hereditary title in the Peerage of Spain

Marquessate of Moratalla
- Creation date: 15 July 1681
- Created by: Charles II
- Peerage: Peerage of Spain
- First holder: Francisco Luis Fernández de Córdoba y de la Cerda, 1st Marquess of Moratalla
- Present holder: Isidro Forester Labrouche y Cabeza de Vaca, 6th Marquess of Moratalla

Marquess of Moratalla (Spanish: Marqués de Moratalla) is a hereditary title in the Peerage of Spain, granted in 1681 by Charles II to Francisco Luis Fernández de Córdoba, Lord of Belmonte and Moratalla.

The name refers to the Palace of Moratalla in Hornachuelos, Córdoba.

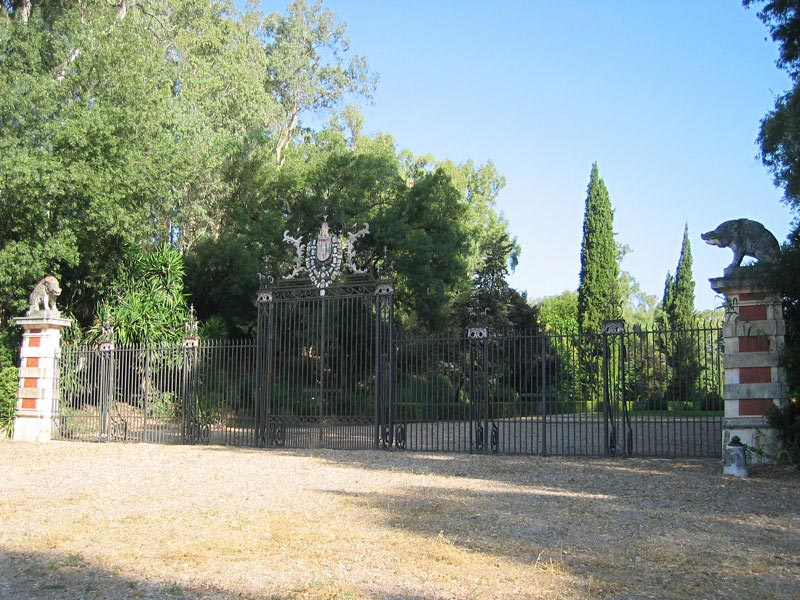
Gates at the entrance of the Palace of Moratalla in Córdoba

== Marquesses of Moratalla (1681) ==
- Francisco Luis Fernández de Córdoba y de la Cerda, 1st Marquess of Moratalla
- José Garcés Fernández de Córdoba y Carrillo de Mendoza, 2nd Marquess of Moratalla
- María Belén Fernández de Córdoba y Lante della Rovere, 3rd Marchioness of Moratalla

== Marquesses of Moratalla (1962) ==
- Ángel Cabeza de Vaca y Carvajal, 4th Marquess of Moratalla
- María de la Soledad (Sol) Cabeza de Vaca y Leighton, 5th Marchioness of Moratalla
- Isidro Forester Labrouche y Cabeza de Vaca, 6th Marquess of Moratalla

== See also ==
- Marquess of Portago
- Count of la Mejorada

== Bibliography ==
- Hidalgos de España, Real Asociación de (2018). Elenco de Grandezas y Títulos Nobiliarios Españoles. Ediciones Hidalguía. ISBN 978-84-94841-02-6.
