= 1957 Mille Miglia =

Italian endurance automobile race

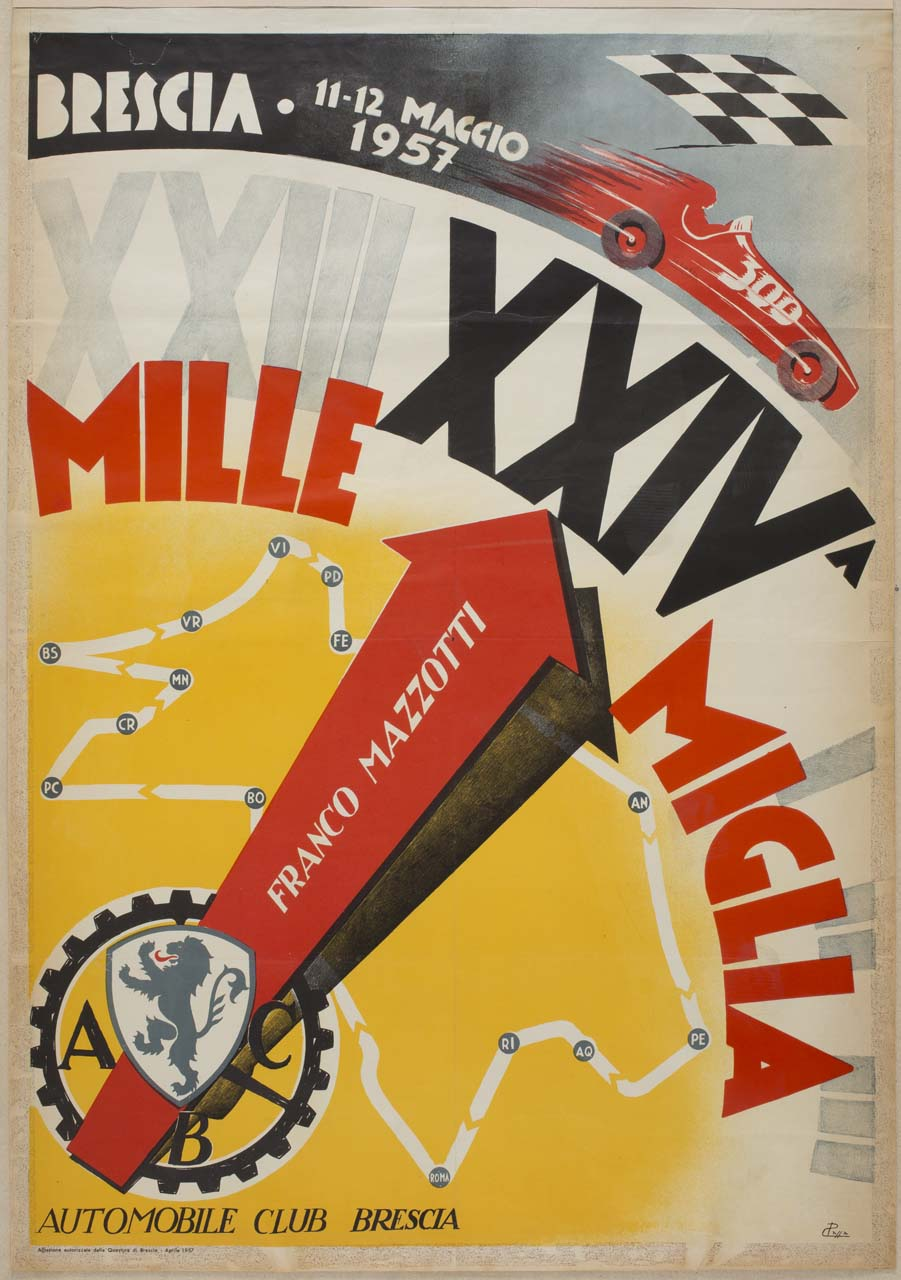
Official poster, with the cities on the course marked by their two letter province codes, save for Roma

The 24. edizione Mille Miglia (Italian for "One Thousand Miles") was an auto race held on a course totalling 992.332 miles (1,597.004 km), made up entirely of public roads around Italy, mostly on the outer parts of the country on 11–12 May 1957. The route was based on a round trip in northern Italy, starting in Brescia, following the Adriatic Sea coast, crossing mountains to Rome, and returning via mountains passes to Brescia. It was the 3rd round of the 1957 World Sportscar Championship season. It was the last edition of the Mille Miglia as a flat out race as the Ferrari of Alfonso de Portago and Edmund G Nelson killed nine spectators near the road, among them five children. Including the unrelated fatal crash of Josef H. Göttgens, twelve persons died during the race, leading the Italian government to immediately end the Mille Miglia and banning all motor racing on the public roads of Italy, which also affected the Targa Florio of that year.

As in previous years, the event was a race against the clock, as the cars were released at one-minute intervals, at night or in the morning hours. The smaller displacement, slower cars started first, with each car number related to their allocated start time. For example, Wolfgang von Trips's car had the number 532, he left Brescia at 5:32am, while the first cars had started late in the evening on the previous day. Some drivers went with navigators, others did not; a number of local Italian drivers had knowledge of the routes being used and felt confident enough that they would not need one.

This race was won by Scuderia Ferrari driver Piero Taruffi without the aid of a navigator, the 3rd time in the past 4 years that a driver won the race without a navigator. He completed the 992-mile distance in 10 hours, 27 minutes and 47 seconds- an average speed of 94.841 mph (152.632 km/h). The Italian finished three minutes in front of his second-placed team-mate, German Wolfgang von Trips. Belgians Olivier Gendebien and Jacques Washer were next, ensuring Scuderia Ferrari finished 1-2-3.

== Report ==
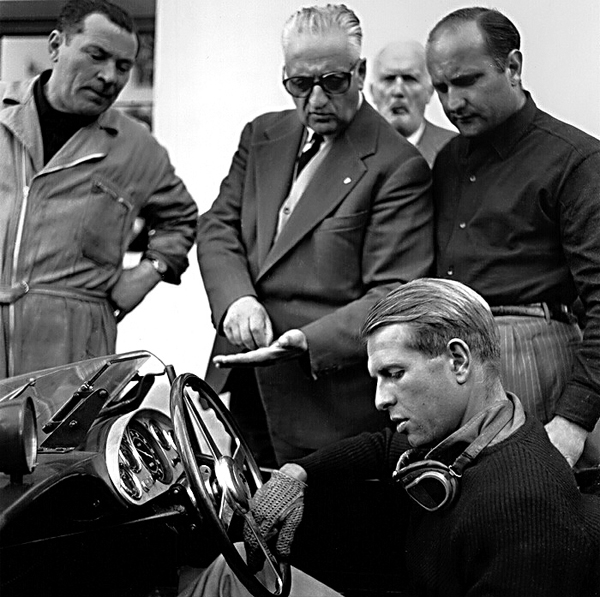
Enzo Ferrari with Peter Collins shortly before departure

=== Entry ===
A total of 391 cars were entered for the event, across 25 classes based on engine sizes, ranging from up to 750cc to over 2.0-litre, for Grand Touring Cars, Touring Cars and Sport Cars. Of these, 310 cars started the event. The limit on the number of starts was reduced from previous years. The Auto Club of Brescia took steps to try to combat the unsportsmanlike tactics by which some competitors sought to negate the procedure of drawing lots for departure times.

Even though the event continued to count towards the World Sportscar Championship, only Ferrari and Maserati entered works teams. Officine Alfieri Maserati was in receivership but still managed to have two 450Ss for Stirling Moss and Jean Behra, a brand new 350S for Hans Herrmann and older 300S for the Italian Giorgio Scarlatti. Meanwhile, Scuderia Ferrari entered four Sports cars, to be driven by Taruffi, von Trips, Peter Collins and Alfonso de Portago. They also entered Olivier Gendebien in a Grand Touring car. Britain was represented by a single semi-works Jaguar D-Type, entered by the Scottish team Ecurie Ecosse for Ron Flockhart.

One of the more unusual entrants was a Kurtis Kraft roadster for Akton Miller, a car constructed in the US, with a powerful 6.4 litre Chrysler engine, mounted on a space-frame single seat chassis, designed for use on American oval circuits.

== Course ==
Brescia – Verona – Venice – Padua – Rovigo – Ferrara – Ravenna – Forlì – Rimini – Pesaro – Ancona – Pescara – L’Aquila – Rieti – Rom – Viterbo – Radicofani – Siena – Florence – Futa pass – Raticosa pass – Bologna – Modena – Reggio nell’Emilia – Parma – Piacenza – Cremona – Mantua – Montichiari – Brescia

== Race ==
Soon after the race started, Maserati's hopes vanished. Before the event even started, Behra was out, having crashed his 450S during pre-test. Moss was forced to retire soon after the start, having rather dangerously snapped a brake pedal. Herrmann did not get as far as the Ravenna checkpoint.

When Taruffi arrived back in Brescia, he was dueling with von Trips but had a three-minute advantage over him due to a later start time. Gendebien finished third, completing a top three sweep for Ferrari. Maserati experienced a debacle with only Scarlatti arriving in Brescia in fourth place overall, followed 15 minutes later by the small 1500cc Porsche 550 RS of Umberto Maglioli. Taruffi reached Brescia after racing for 10 hours and 27 minutes after he left Brescia at 05:35.

== Fatal crashes ==
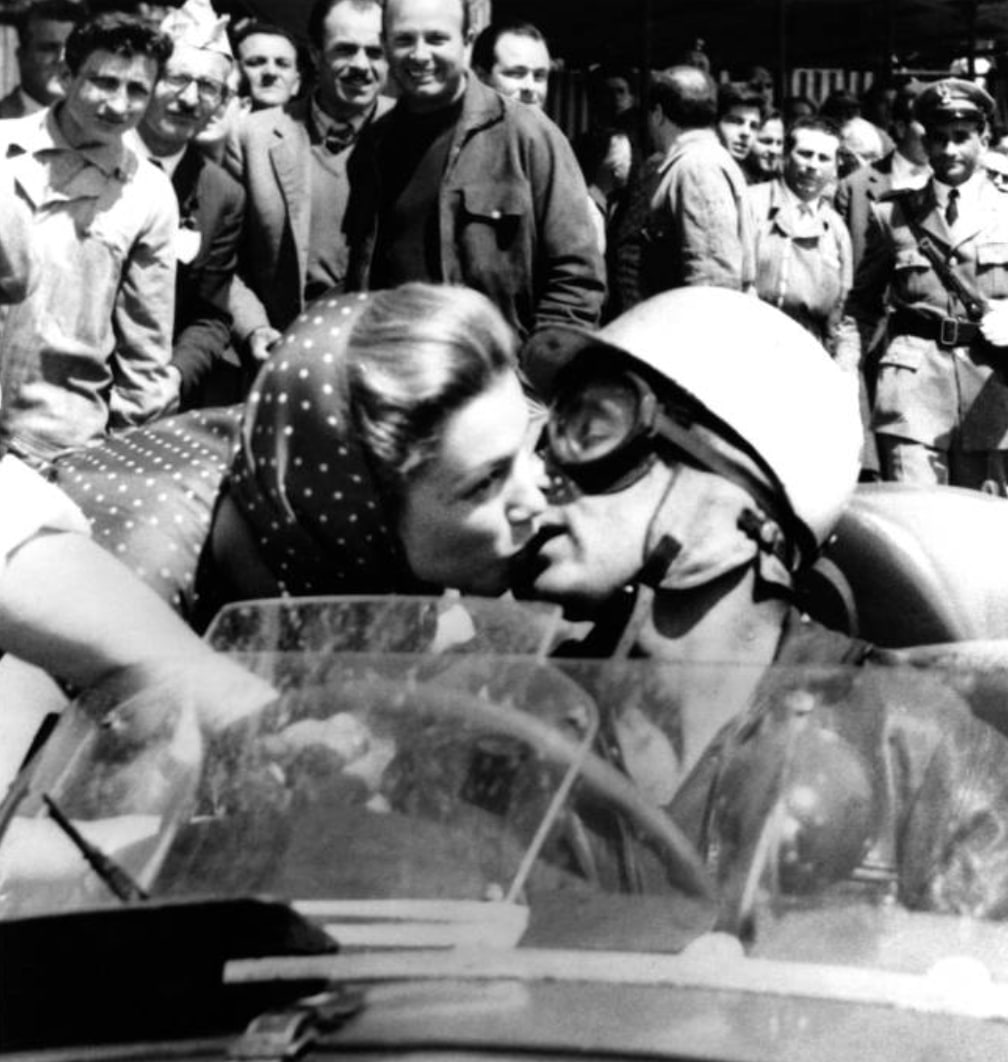
Linda Christian kissing Alfonso de Portago before the latter departed for his last part of the Mille Miglia race. The photo is popularly known as "The Kiss of Death" (Il Bacio della Morte).

In the 1938 edition of the Mille Miglia, 10 spectators were killed in Bologna (Sciagura di Bologna), and the event was banned in 1939 and resumed on a shorter course in 1940. Worse was to come in 1957.

Coming from Mantua and approaching Guidizzolo, less than 40 miles from the finish in Brescia, de Portago's front tyre exploded. He lost control of the car; it hit a telephone pole, jumped over a brook, then hit several spectators. The Ferrari then bounced back on the road, hitting more spectators, slid over the road, spinning, and ended up, wheels down, in a brook at the other side of the road. In addition to de Portago, his American navigator Edmund Gunner Nelson and nine spectators – among them five children – were killed, and a further 20 were injured. De Portago's body was found near the car, severed in half.

Unrelated, Dutchman Josef Göttgens crashed his Triumph TR3 near Florence and later died of his injuries in a Florence hospital.

Enzo Ferrari was prosecuted on 11 counts of manslaughter. He was acquitted in 1961 after a panel of automobile engineers told the court that the blowout was probably caused by the car striking a "cat's eye" road marker.

Three days after the race, the Italian government decreed the end of the Mille Miglia and banned all motor racing on the public roads of Italy which also affected the Targa Florio. Taruffi thus became the last winner of this famous event.

== Classification ==
=== Official results ===
Of the 310 starters, 172 were classified as finishers. Therefore, only a selection of notable racers has been listed below.

Class Winners are in Bold text.

Pos.	No.	Class	Driver		Entrant	Car - Engine	Time	Reason Out
1st	**535**	**S+2.0**	**(Italy) Piero Taruffi**		**Scuderia Ferrari**	**Ferrari 315 S**	**10hr 27:47**	
2nd	532	S+2.0	(West Germany) Wolfgang von Trips		Scuderia Ferrari	Ferrari 315 S	10hr 30:48	
3rd	**417**	**GT+2.0**	**(Belgium) Olivier Gendebien**	**(Belgium) Jacques Washer**	**Scuderia Ferrari**	**Ferrari 250 GT LWB Scaglietti**	**10hr 35:53**	
4th	530	S+2.0	(Italy) Giorgio Scarlatti		Officine Alfieri Maserati	Maserati 300S	11hr 00:58	
5th	**349**	**S1.5**	**(Italy) Umberto Maglioli**			**Porsche 550 RS**	**11hr 14:07**	
6th	441	GT+2.0	(Italy) Camillo Luglio	(Italy) Umberto Carli		Ferrari 250 GT LWB Zagato	11hr 26.58	
7th	431	GT+2.0	(Italy) Paolo Ferraro			Ferrari 250 GT LWB Scaglietti	11hr 30:55	
8th	**451**	**S2.0**	**(Italy) Gino Munaron**			**Ferrari 500 TRC**	**11hr 32:04**	
9th	430	GT+2.0	(Italy) Albino Buticchi			Ferrari 250 GT LWB Zagato	11hr 44:27	
10th	458	S2.0	(Austria) Gotfrid Köchert		Gotfrid Köchert	Ferrari 500 TRC	11hr 49:02	
11th	354	S1.5	(Switzerland) Heinz Schiller		Ecurie La Meute	Porsche 550 RS	11hr 54:24	
12th	453	S2.0	(Italy) Siro Sbraci			Ferrari 500 TRC	12hr 02:08	
13th	507	S2.0	(France) Jean Guichet			Ferrari 500 Mondial	12hr 08:22	
14th	**225**	**GT1.6**	**(West Germany) Paul-Ernst Strähle**	**(West Germany) Herbert Linge**		**Porsche 356A Carrera**	**12hr 10:08**	
15th	442	GT+2.0	(Italy) ”Kammamuri”	(Italy) Vincenzo Bellini		Ferrari 250 GT LWB Scaglietti	12hr 21:21	
16th	435	GT+2.0	(Italy) Erasmo Crivellari	(Italy) Oscar Papais		Ferrari 250 GT LWB Scaglietti	12hr 22:08	
17th	224	GT1.6	(West Germany) Dieter Lissmann			Porsche 356A Carrera	12hr 29:45	
18th	217	GT1.6	(West Germany) Hans-Joachim Walter	(West Germany) R. Reinhold		Porsche 356A Carrera	12hr 33:18	
19th	422	GT+2.0	(Italy) Guido Mario Terzi			Lancia Aurelia B20	12hr 35:45	
20th	**105**	**GT1.3**	**(Switzerland) Henry Convert**	**(Switzerland) Raul Martin**		**Alfa Romeo Giulietta SV**	**12hr 39:44**	
21st	122	GT1.3	(Italy) Pietro Laureati			Alfa Romeo Giulietta SV	12hr 44:50	
22nd	450	S2.0	(Italy) Odoardo Govoni			Maserati A6GCS	12hr 46:07	
23rd	504	S2.0	(Italy) Nando Pagliarini			Maserati 200SI	12hr 47:47	
24th	102	GT1.3	(Greece) Kostas Spiliotakis	(Greece) S. Zannos		Alfa Romeo Giulietta SV	12hr 48:54	
25th	439	GT+2.0	(Italy) Ovidio Capelli			Ferrari 250 GT LWB Scaglietti	12hr 49:28	
26th	**325**	**S1.1**	**(Italy) Giulio Cabianca**			**Osca S950**	**12hr 51:46**	
27th	403	S1.5	(West Germany) Harald von Saucken	(West Germany) Georg Bialas		Porsche 550 RS	12hr 54:05	
28th	**410**	**TS+2.0**	**(Switzerland) Albert Heuberger**			**BMW 502**	**12hr 54:33**	
29th	109	GT1.3	(Italy) Bruno Grazioli Vicenza	(Italy) Paolo Grazioli		Alfa Romeo Giulietta SV	12hr 54:47	
30th	117	GT1.3	(Italy) Rocco Lanzini	(Italy) Gianfranco Stanga		Alfa Romeo Giulietta SV	12hr 55:16	
31st	357	GT1.3	(United Kingdom) Robin Carnegie		Fitzwilliam Racing Team	MG A	12hr 55:21	
33rd	121	GT1.3	(Italy) Carlo Mario Abate			Alfa Romeo Giulietta SVZ	13hr 00:04	
34th	**308**	**GT2.0**	**(Italy) Luigi Nobile**	**(Italy) Pietro Cagnana**		**Fiat 8V Zagato**	**13hr 00:49**	
37th	414	GT+2.0	(United Kingdom) Tommy Wisdom	(United Kingdom) Cecil Winby		Austin-Healey 100/Six	13hr 04:10	
41st	230	GT1.6	(Netherlands) Carel Godin de Beaufort			Porsche 356A Carrera	13hr 06:58	
46th	409	TS+2.0	(West Germany) Walter Löffler	(Norway) Carsten Johansson		BMW 502	13hr 18:27	
50th	**012**	**GT1.1**	**(Italy) Luciano Mantovani**			**Lancia Appia GT Zagato**	**13hr 20:22**	
54th	024	GT1.1	(Italy) Enrico Anselmi			Lancia Appia GT Zagato	13hr 23:39	
58th	**138**	**S750**	**(Italy) Giancarlo Rigamonti**			**Osca S750**	**13hr 29:41**	
59th	505	S2.0	(Italy) Roberto Montali			Ferrari 500 Mondial berlinetta	13hr 29:44	
63rd	**52**	**GT750**	**(Italy) Alfonso Thiele**			**Fiat-Abarth 750 GT Zagato**	**13hr 32:33**	
66th	**040**	**TS1.3**	**(France) Roger Delagenste**			**Peugeot 403**	**13hr 34:17**	
68th	40	GT750	(Italy) Marino Guarnieri			Fiat-Abarth 750 GT Zagato	13hr 38:40	
73rd	015	GT1.1	(Italy) Giorgio Lurani			Lancia Appia GT Zagato	13hr 40:52	
77th	46	GT750	(Italy) Vittorio Gianni	(Italy) Luciano Gianni		Fiat-Abarth 750 Zagato	13hr 45:57	
78th	**208**	**TS1.6**	**(West Germany) Joachim Springer**			**Ford Taunus 15 M**	**13hr 46:54**	
79th	348	S1.5	(Belgium) Georges Berger	(Belgium) René Foiret		Maserati 150S	13hr 47:28	
81st	**73**	**GT1.0**	**(France) Jean-Claude Vidilles**			**D.B-Panhard HBR**	**13hr 47:42**	
83rd	**64**	**TS1.0**	**(Belgium) Paul Frère**			**Renault Dauphine**	**13hr 47:55**	
86th	**256**	**TS2.0**	**(France) Jean Aumas**	**(West Germany) Willy Brandt**		**Alfa Romeo 1900TI**	**13hr 56:24**	
87th	**244**	**T2.0**	**(Italy) Achille Fona**	**(Italy) Amletto Della Fona**		**Alfa Romeo 1900TI**	**13hr 56:30**	
91st	**006**	**TS1.1**	**(Italy) Ersilio Mandrini**	**(Italy) Luigi Bertassi**		**Alfa Romeo Giulietta**	**14hr 16:55**	
93rd	212	TS1.6	(United Kingdom) Peter Harper	(United Kingdom) Jackie Reece		Sunbeam Rapier	14hr 06:16	
95th	**206**	**T1.6**	**(France) Paul Guiraud**	**(France) G. Chevron**		**Peugeot 403**	**14hr 12:28**	
98th	257	TS2.0	(France) Claude Bourillot	(France) Pierre About		Citroën DS19	14hr 15:16	
99th	**032**	**T1.3**	**(Italy) Alberto Massari**	**(Italy) Pier Luigi Gatti**		**Peugeot 403**	**14hr 12:28**	
103rd	253	TS2.0	(Monaco) Louis Chiron	(Monaco) André Testut		Citroën DS19	14hr 22:01	
108th	**2348**	**T1.1**	**(Italy) Dino Faggi**			**Fiat 1100/103TV**	**14hr 31:23**	
110th	71	TS1.0	(France) Maurice Michy			Renault Dauphine	14hr 32:53	
141st	**63**	**T1.0**	**(France) Robert Chancel**	**(France) Bergonoukoux**		**Panhard Dyna 54**	**15hr 22:40**	
154th	**14**	**TS750**	**(France) Louis Chardin**			**Renault 4CV**	**15hr 59:47**	
161st	**3**	**T750**	**(Sweden) Carl Lohmander**	**(Sweden) Harald Kronegård**		**Saab 93**	**16hr 40:22**	
172nd	77	GT1.0	(France) Gerard Parmentier			D.B.-Panhard HBR	18hr 34:03	
DNF	534	S+2.0	(United Kingdom) Peter Collins	(United Kingdom) Louis Klemantaski	Scuderia Ferrari	Ferrari 335 S	5hr 03:11	Drive shaft
DNF	531	S+2.0	(Spain) Alfonso de Portago	(United States) Edmund G Nelson	Scuderia Ferrari	Ferrari 335 S	5hr 17:43	Fatal accident (de Portago & Nelson & 9 spectators)
DNF	448	S2.0	(Italy) Franco Bordoni			Maserati 200SI	6hr 32:24	DNF
DNF	337	S1.1	(United Kingdom) Gregor Grant			Lotus-Climax Eleven	6hr 58:42	Split fuel tank
DNF	437	GT+2.0	(Italy) Piero Scotti	(Italy) Adalberto Parenti		Mercedes-Benz 300 SL		DNF
DNF	69	TS1.0	(France) Jean Lucas			Renault Dauphine	7hr 18:43	DNF
DNF	39	GT750	(France) Jean Rédélé			Alpine A106 MM	7hr 26:49	DNF
DNF	309	GT2.0	(Netherlands) Joseph H. Göttgens			Triumph TR3	7hr 56:12	Fatal accident
DNF	141	S750	(France) René Philippe Faure			Stanguellini Efac Sport 750		DNF
DNF	213	TS1.6	(United Kingdom) Sheila van Damm	(United Kingdom) David Humphrey		Sunbeam Rapier		Accident
DNF	227	GT1.6	(Sweden) Gunnar Blomqvist			Porsche 356A Carrera 1500 GS		DNF
DNF	301	GT2.0	(Italy) Ludovico Scarfiotti			Fiat 8V Zagato		DNF
DNF	339	S1.1	(United Kingdom) Bruno Ferrari			Lotus-Climax Eleven		DNF
DNF	428	GT+2.0	(Sweden) Bengt Martenson	(West Germany) Wittigo von Einseidel		Mercedes-Benz 300 SL		DNF
DNF	440	GT+2.0	(West Germany) Wolfgang Seidel	(West Germany) Helmut Glöckler		Mercedes-Benz 300 SL		DNF
DNF	506	S2.0	(Italy) Luigi Bellucci		Officine Alfieri Maserati	Maserati 200SI		Oil leak
DNF	518	S+2.0	(United Kingdom) Ron Flockhart		Ecurie Ecosse	Jaguar D-Type		Loose fuel tank
DNF	524	S+2.0	(United States) Ak Miller	(United States) Douglas Harrison	Akton Miller	Caballo de Hiero-Chrysler Mk II		Broken exhaust
DNF	115	GT1.3	(United States) Henry N. Manney III			Alfa Romeo Giulietta SV		DNF
DNF	533	S+2.0	(West Germany) Hans Herrmann		Officine Alfieri Maserati	Maserati 350S		Holed sump
DNF	537	S+2.0	(United Kingdom) Stirling Moss	(United Kingdom) Denis Jenkinson	Officine Alfieri Maserati	Maserati 450S		Broken brake pedal

=== Class winners ===
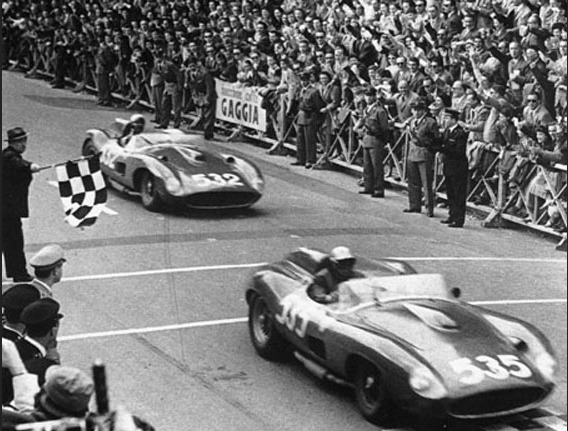
Taruffi and von Trips cross the finish line in Brescia on 12 May 1957. Taruffi had started 3 minutes later and caught up with v. Trips

Class	Winners		
Sport +2000	535	Ferrari 315 S	Taruffi
Sports 2000	451	Ferrari 500 TRC	Munaron
Sports 1500	349	Porsche 550 RS	Maglioli
Sports 1100	325	Osca S950	Cabianca
Sports 750	138	Osca S750	Rigamonti
Grand Touring +2000	417	Ferrari 250 GT LWB Scaglietti	Gendebien / Washer
Grand Touring 2000	308	Fiat 8V Zagato	Nobile / Cagnana
Grand Touring 1600	225	Porsche 356A Carrera	Strähle / Linge
Grand Touring 1300	105	Alfa Romeo Giulietta SV	Convert / Martin
Grand Touring 1100	012	Lancia Appia GT Zagato	Mantovani
Grand Touring 1000	73	D.B.-Panhard HBR	Vidilles
Grand Touring 750	52	Fiat-Abarth 750 Zagato	Thiele
Touring Special +2000	410	BMW 502	Heuberger
Touring Special 2000	256	Alfa Romeo 1900 TI	Aumas / Brandt
Touring Special 1600	208	Ford Taunus 15 M	Springer
Touring Special 1300	040	Peugeot 403	Delageneste
Touring Special 1100	006	Fiat 1100/103	Mandrini / Bertassi
Touring Special 1000	64	Renault Dauphine	Frère
Touring Special 750	14	Renault 4CV	Chardin
Touring Prep 2000	244	Alfa Romeo 1900 TI	Fona / Della Tore
Touring Prep 1600	206	Peugeot 403	Guiraud / Chevron
Touring Prep 1300	032	Alf Romeo Giulietta	Massari / Gatti
Touring Prep 1100	2348	Fiat 1100/103 TV	Faggi
Touring Prep 1000	63	Panhard Dyna 54	Chancel / Bergonoukoux
Touring Prep 750	3	Saab 93	Lohmander / Kronegård

== Standings after the race ==
Pos	Championship	Points
1	(Italy) Ferrari	19
2	(Italy) Maserati	17
3	(United Kingdom) Jaguar	7
4	(West Germany) Porsche	2
5	(Italy) O.S.C.A.	1

- Note: Only the top five positions are included in this set of standings.
  Championship points were awarded for the first six places in each race in the order of 8-6-4-3-2-1. Manufacturers were only awarded points for their highest finishing car with no points awarded for positions filled by additional cars. Only the best 4 results out of the 6 races could be retained by each manufacturer. Points earned but not counted towards the championship totals are listed within brackets in the above table.

== In popular culture ==
- The race is dramatized in the 2023 film Ferrari, including a gory depiction of de Portago’s fatal crash.

World Sportscar Championship
Previous race: 12 Hours of Sebring	1957 season	Next race: 1000km of Nürburgring
