= Linda Christian =

Mexican actress (1923–2011)

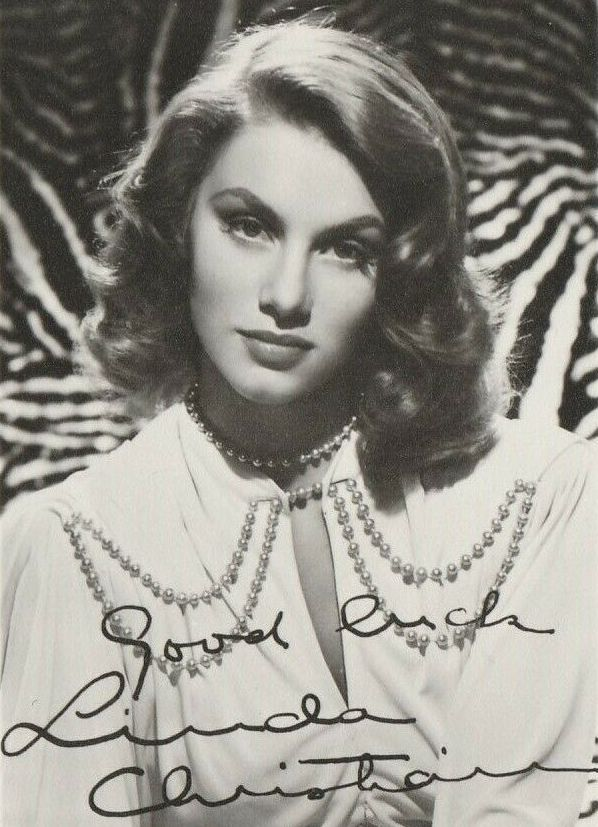
- Christian, c. 1948
- Born: Blanca Rosa Henrietta Stella Welter Vorhauer; November 13, 1923; Tampico, Tamaulipas, Mexico
- Died: July 22, 2011 (aged 87); Palm Desert, California, U.S.
- Other names: Linda Christian Power, Linda Welter
- Occupation: Actress
- Years active: 1943–1988
- Spouses: Tyrone Power (m. 1949; div. 1956) Edmund Purdom (m. 1962; div. 1963)
- Children: Romina Power; Taryn Power
- Family: Ariadne Welter (sister)

Linda Christian (born Blanca Rosa Henrietta Stella Welter Vorhauer; November 13, 1923 – July 22, 2011) was a Mexican film actress who appeared in Mexican and Hollywood films. Her career reached its peak in the 1940s and 1950s. She played Mara in the last Johnny Weissmuller Tarzan film Tarzan and the Mermaids (1948). She is also noted for being the first Bond girl, appearing in a 1954 television adaptation of the James Bond novel Casino Royale. In 1963, she starred as Eva Ashley in an episode of The Alfred Hitchcock Hour titled "An Out for Oscar".

== Early life ==
Christian was born in Tampico, Tamaulipas, Mexico, a daughter of Dutch engineer and Royal Dutch Shell executive Gerardus Jacob Welter, and his Mexican-born wife, Blanca Rosa Vorhauer, who was of Spanish, German and French descent. The Welter family moved a great deal during Christian's youth, living everywhere from South America and Europe to the Middle East and Africa. As a result of this nomadic lifestyle, Christian became an accomplished polyglot with the ability to speak fluent French, German, Dutch, Spanish, English, Italian and even a bit of haphazard Arabic and Russian.

Christian had three younger siblings: a sister, actress Ariadna Gloria Welter, and two brothers, Gerardus Jacob Welter and Edward Albert Welter.

== Career ==
In her youth, Christian's only aspiration was to become a physician. After she graduated from secondary school she had a fortuitous meeting with her screen idol Errol Flynn, who became her lover; he persuaded her to give up her hopes of joining the medical profession, move to Hollywood, and pursue an acting career. Not long after arriving in Hollywood she was spotted by Louis B. Mayer's secretary at a fashion show in Beverly Hills. He offered, and she accepted, a seven-year contract with MGM.

Her stage name was invented by Flynn, who gave her the surname of Fletcher Christian of Mutiny on the Bounty fame. Flynn had played Fletcher Christian in a 1933 Australian film.

In his autobiography My Wicked, Wicked Ways, Flynn states that immediately after Linda Christian's screen test, he offered to pay for her to have a couple of crooked teeth fixed. When he got a whopping bill, he discovered that she had taken the opportunity to undergo major cosmetic dentistry. Years later, when he met her again, he said, "Smile, baby – I want to see those choppers: they took their first bite out of me."

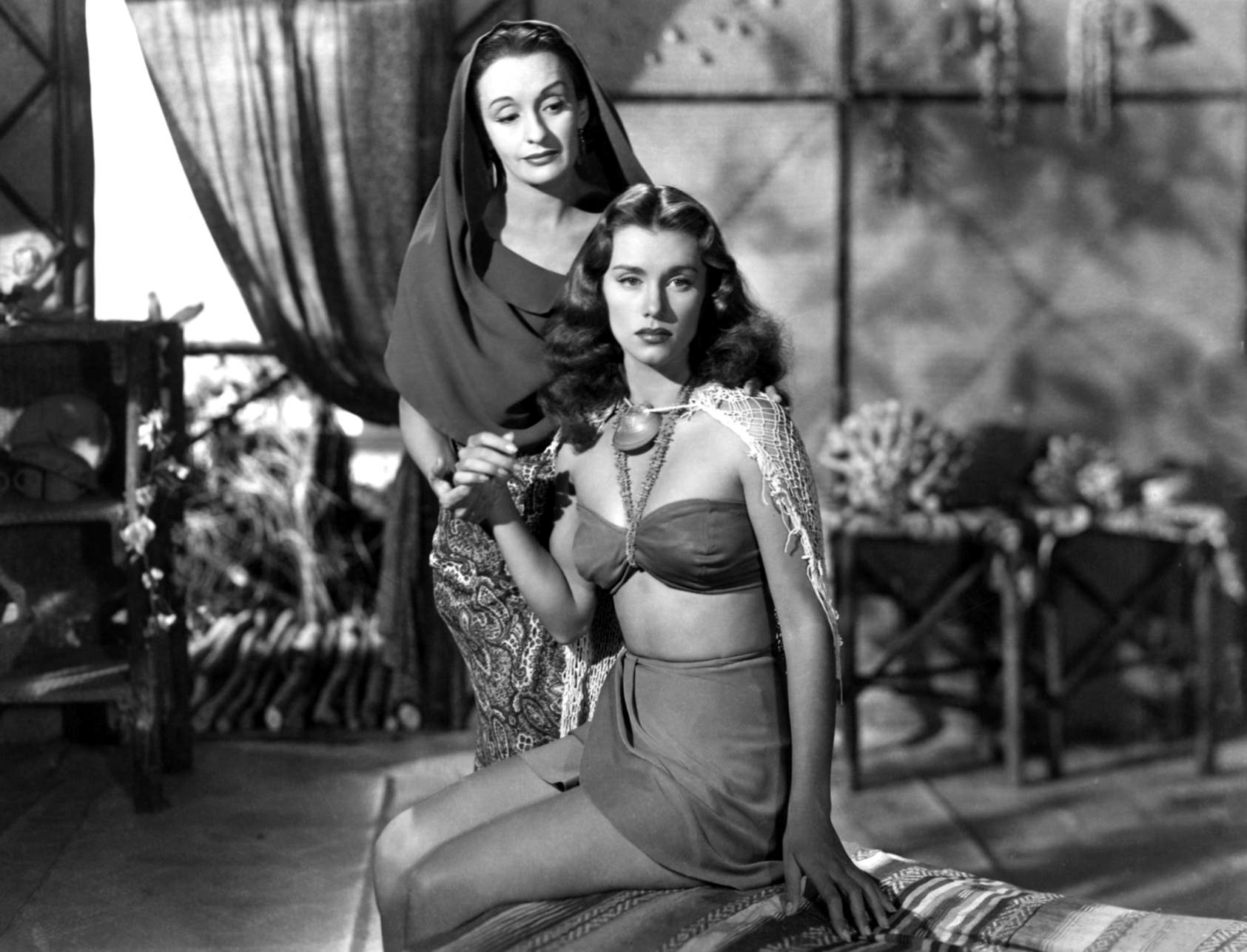
Christian with Andrea Palma in Tarzan and the Mermaids (1948)

She made her film debut in the 1944 musical comedy Up in Arms, co-starring Danny Kaye and Dinah Shore. This movie also happened to be Danny Kaye's own first film. This film was followed by Holiday in Mexico (1946), Green Dolphin Street (1947), and what was perhaps her best-known film, Tarzan and the Mermaids (1948). She was the subject of a well-known photograph published in the January 1, 1949 issue of Vogue.

Christian was the first Bond girl to appear on screen, playing Valerie Mathis (opposite Barry Nelson as James Bond) in the 1954 TV adaptation of Casino Royale, beating Ursula Andress to the screen by eight years.

In 2001, a Golden Palm Star on the Palm Springs Walk of Stars was dedicated to her.

== Marriages and relationships ==
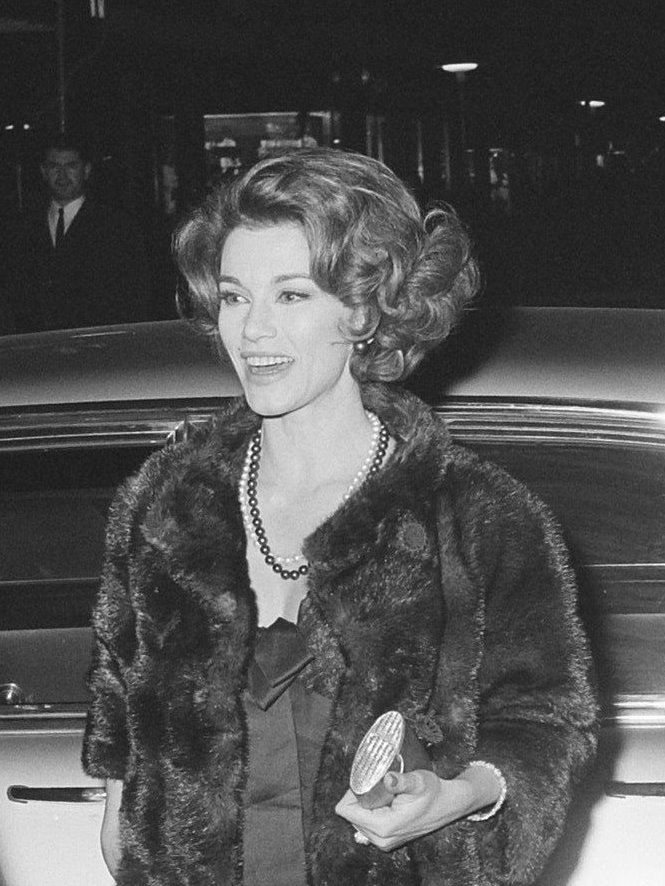
Christian in 1966

Christian's fame, however, was largely derived from being married to the popular screen idol Tyrone Power between 1949 and 1956, and then from being divorced from him. The couple married in Rome, Italy, with Monsignor William A. Hemmick performing the ceremony at Santa Francesca Romana. Christian wore a formfitting gold-damask gown, and the church was decorated with two thousand "Esther" carnations. She and Power were the parents of singer Romina Power and actress Taryn Power. Romina was one half of the Italian singing duo Al Bano and Romina Power.

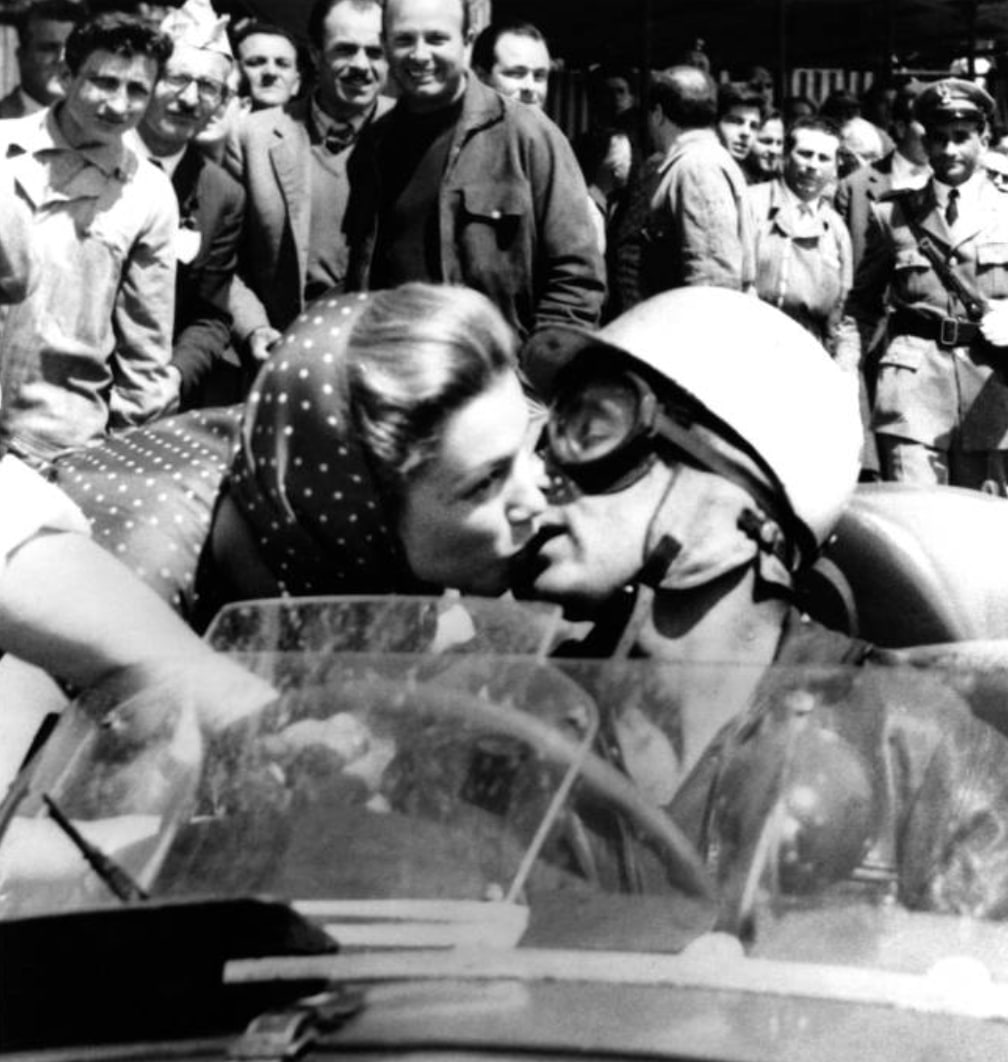
The Kiss of Death, Rome, 12 May 1957.

A month after she divorced Tyrone Power, Christian was seen with Spanish racing driver Alfonso de Portago, who was married to American Carroll de Portago (later Carroll Petrie). Carroll had recently given birth to "Fon's" second child Anthony. De Portago was dating model Dorian Leigh, mother of his recently born illegitimate son Kim.

Linda was photographed with de Portago at the 1957 Mille Miglia road race across Italy. The photo shows Christian leaning in to kiss Fon before he resumed the race in which he would crash his Ferrari, killing himself, his navigator Ed Nelson, and nine spectators. The press labeled the photo "The Kiss of Death". De Portago was 28 years old. Her ex-husband, Tyrone Power, died the following year of a heart attack at the age of 44. Christian was later married to the Rome-based British actor Edmund Purdom.

On several occasions, Christian and Power were offered the opportunity to work together, but for various reasons each offer was refused or rescinded. The most notable opportunity to co-star together came in 1953, when they were offered leading roles in From Here to Eternity. Power did not want to do the film and rejected the offer. The roles went to Donna Reed and Montgomery Clift.

Christian had a relationship with Glenn Ford in the early 1960s.

== Death ==
Christian died on July 22, 2011, at the age of 87.

== In popular culture ==
- Canadian actress Sarah Gadon portrayed Christian in the 2023 biopic Ferrari.

== Selected filmography ==
Two items appear in this article's introductory paragraph which are not in the following list.

- The Rock of Souls (1942) (credited as Linda Welter)
- Up in Arms (1944) as Goldwyn Girl (uncredited)
- Holiday in Mexico (1946) as Angel (uncredited)
- Green Dolphin Street (1947) as Hine-Moa
- Tarzan and the Mermaids (1948) as Mara
- The Happy Time (1952) as Mignonette Chappius
- Athena (1954) as Beth Hallson
- Casino Royale (1954)
- Thunderstorm (1956) as Maria Ramon
- Peter Voss, Hero of the Day (1959) as Grace McNaughty
- The House of the Seven Hawks (1959) as Elsa
- The Devil's Hand (1962) as Bianca Milan
- The V.I.P.s (1963) as Miriam Marshall
- The Alfred Hitchcock Hour (1963) (Season 1 Episode 26: "An Out for Oscar") as Eva Ashley
- The Beauty Jungle (1964) as Self, Rose of England Judge (uncredited)
- Full Hearts and Empty Pockets (1964) as Minelli
- The Moment of Truth (1965) as Linda, American Woman
- How to Seduce a Playboy (1966) as Lucy's Mother
- 10:32 (1966) as Ellen Martens

== Bibliography ==
- Christian, Linda. Linda, My Own Story. New York: Crown Publishers (1962).

== Sources ==
- Parla, Paul & Mitchell, Charles P. (2000). Screen Sirens Scream!. McFarland. ISBN 0786445874.

| New title | Bond girl actress 1954 | Succeeded by Ursula Andress |
