= Cavriana =

- Comune
- Comune di Cavriana
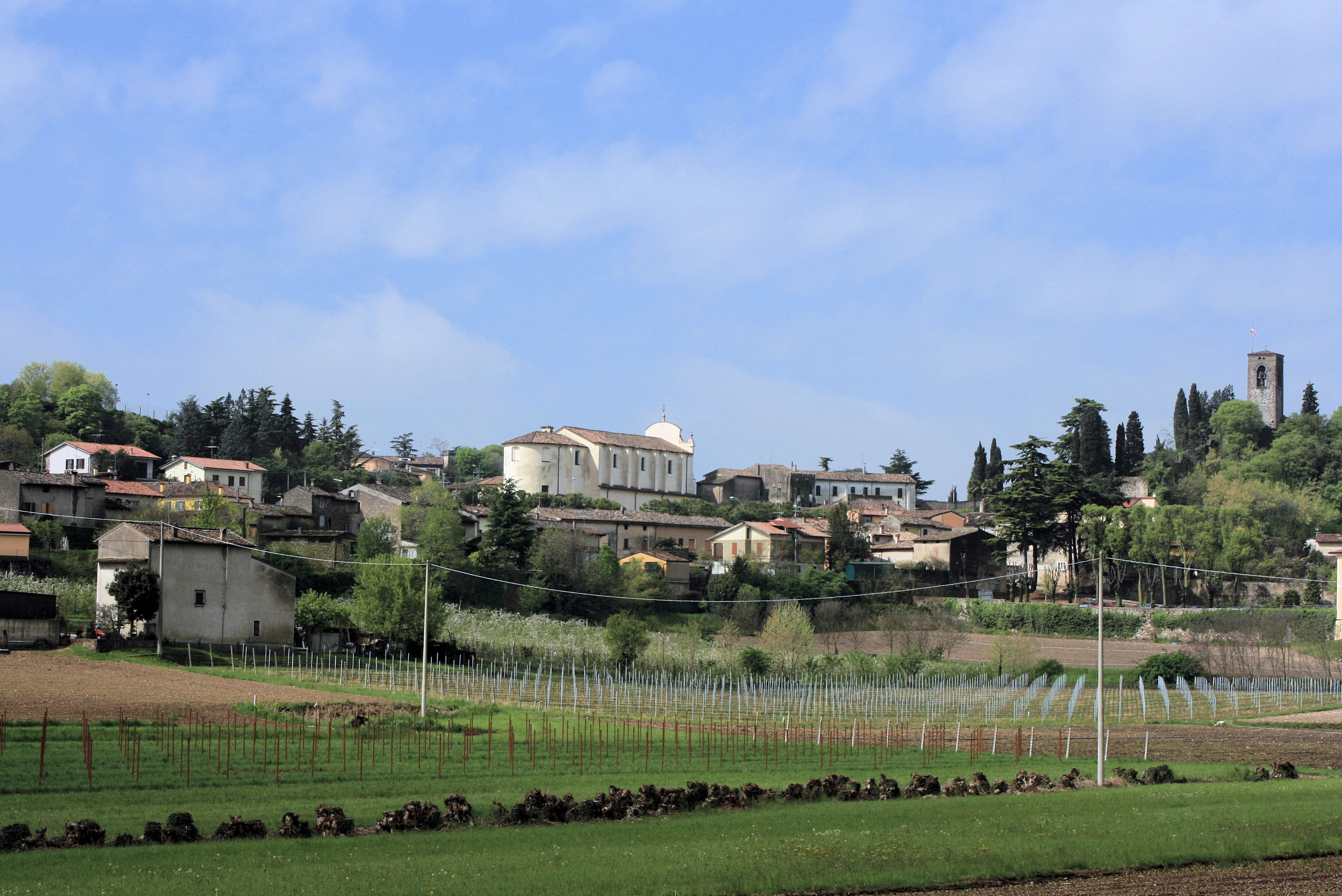

- Coat of arms

- Location within Italy Location within Lombardy
- Coordinates: 45°21′N 10°36′E
- Country: Italy
- Region: Lombardy
- Province: Mantua (MN)
- Frazioni: Bande, Campagnolo, Castelgrimaldo, San Giacomo, San Cassiano

Government
  - Mayor: Matteo Guardini

Area
  - Total: 36.8 km^{2} (14.2 sq mi)

Population (March 2021)
  - Total: 3,710
  - Density: 101/km^{2} (261/sq mi)
- Time zone: UTC+1 (CET)
  - Summer (DST): UTC+2 (CEST)
- Postal code: 46040
- Dialing code: 0376
- Patron saint: san Biagio
- Saint day: 3 February
- Website: Official website

Cavriana is a comune (municipality) in the Province of Mantua in the Italian region Lombardy, part of the municipalities of Alto Mantovano.

== Geography ==
Cavriana is in the northern part of the Province of Mantua. It is located about 110 kilometres (68 mi) east of Milan and about 25 kilometres (16 mi) northwest of Mantua. It is on a hilly territory (with a minimum altitude of 43 m and a maximum of 202 m). Cavriana borders with the Province of Brescia, with the municipalities of Pozzolengo and Lonato del Garda, while the Province of Verona (Valeggio sul Mincio) and the Garda Lake are just a few kilometers away.

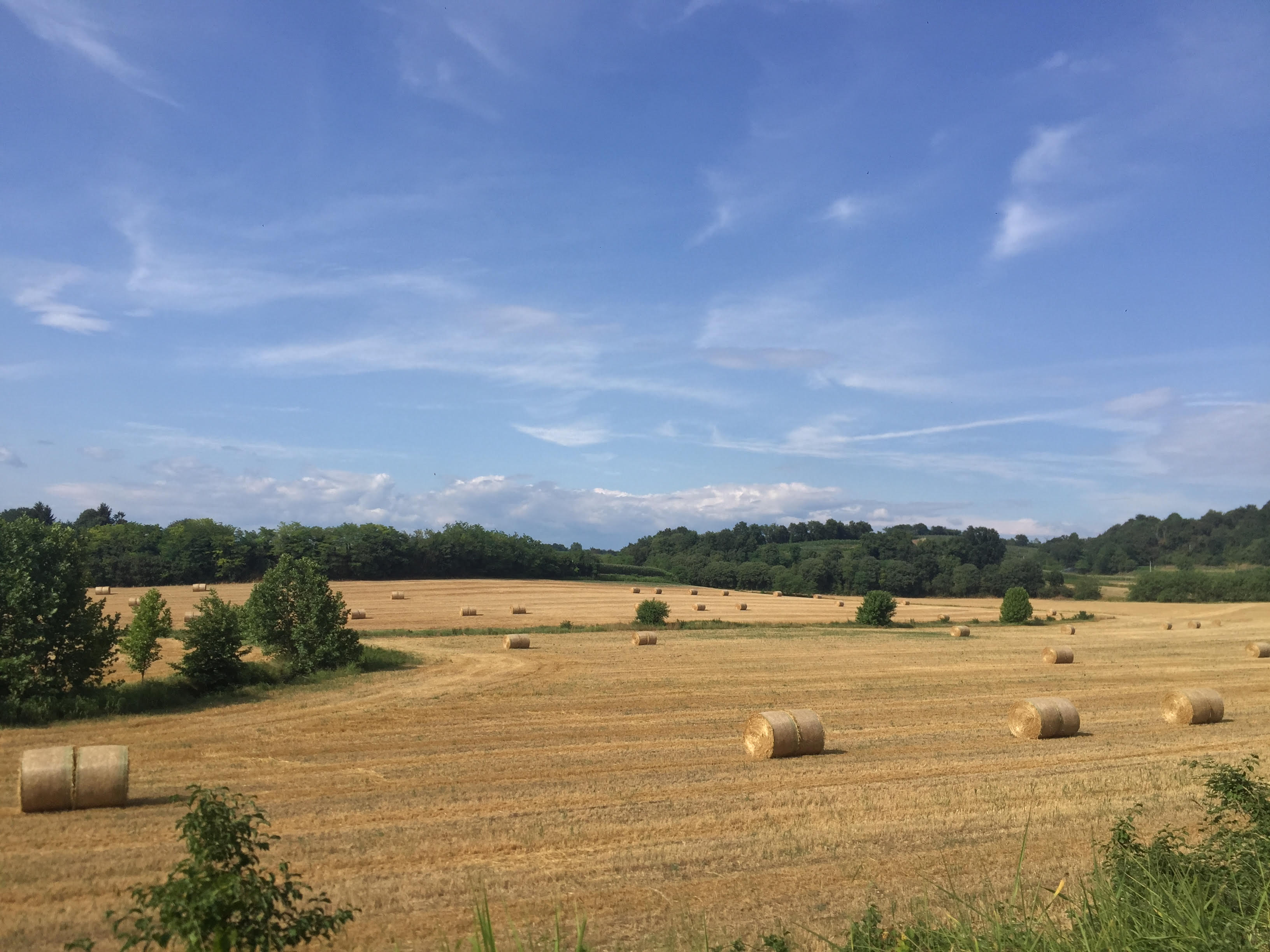
View of the hills of Cavriana, hamlet of Campagnolo

The town has 5 hamlets: San Cassiano, San Giacomo, Castelgrimaldo, Campagnolo and Bande.

== Origins of the name ==
The name "Cavriana" could derive from the Latin Caprius or Caprilius plus the suffix -ana.

What is sure is that the small town was called Capriana: it is indeed mentioned in the Latin poem Anticerberus by Bongiovanni da Cavriana written in the second half of the XIII century. He wrote: "Me Capriana tulit, dicor Bonus atque Iohannes" [I was born in Cavriana and my name is Bongiovanni].

== History ==
Settlements in Cavriana started in the Bronze Age, specifically in 2040 B.C. with the pile-dwelling of Bande, now one of the hamlets of Cavriana. Many findings of that age have been discovered, among which some important brotlaibidoles, small clay objects dating back to the 2100-1400 B.C. periods, engraved with symbols whose meaning is still unknown and found throughout Europe.

The phase of Romanization started in 225 b.C. Cavriana was a centre of commerce thanks to the main roads passing near the settlement (Via Postumia and Strada Cavallara): this is why many Roman villas have been discovered, as well as two necropolis and a worship place.

The early medieval history is not as known as the prehistoric one and Northern Italy was invaded by different peoples. Probably the first defensive structure dates back to 1045, when Henry III acknowledged Cavriana as property of the bishop of Mantua. In 1367 Cavriana became part of the territories of the House of Gonzaga, princes of Mantua. The castle was expanded in these years because Cavriana was a border area between Visconti and the Republic of Venice. With Ludovico III, in the XV century, the castle of Cavriana became a refined home and hosted architects, such as Luca Fancelli, as well as Isabella d'Este. Cavriana saw a flourishing time and its decline started in 1630. It fell under Austrian domination in 1707. On the 24th June 1859 Cavriana saw the Battle of Solferino, when the Austrian army was defeated by Napoleon III. Cavriana joined the Kingdom of Italy in 1861.

The road between Cerlongo and Guidizzolo, in the communal territory of Cavriana, was the location of Alfonso de Portago's fatal accident in the 1957 Mille Miglia. A memorial slab remembers the event along the road.

== Main sights ==
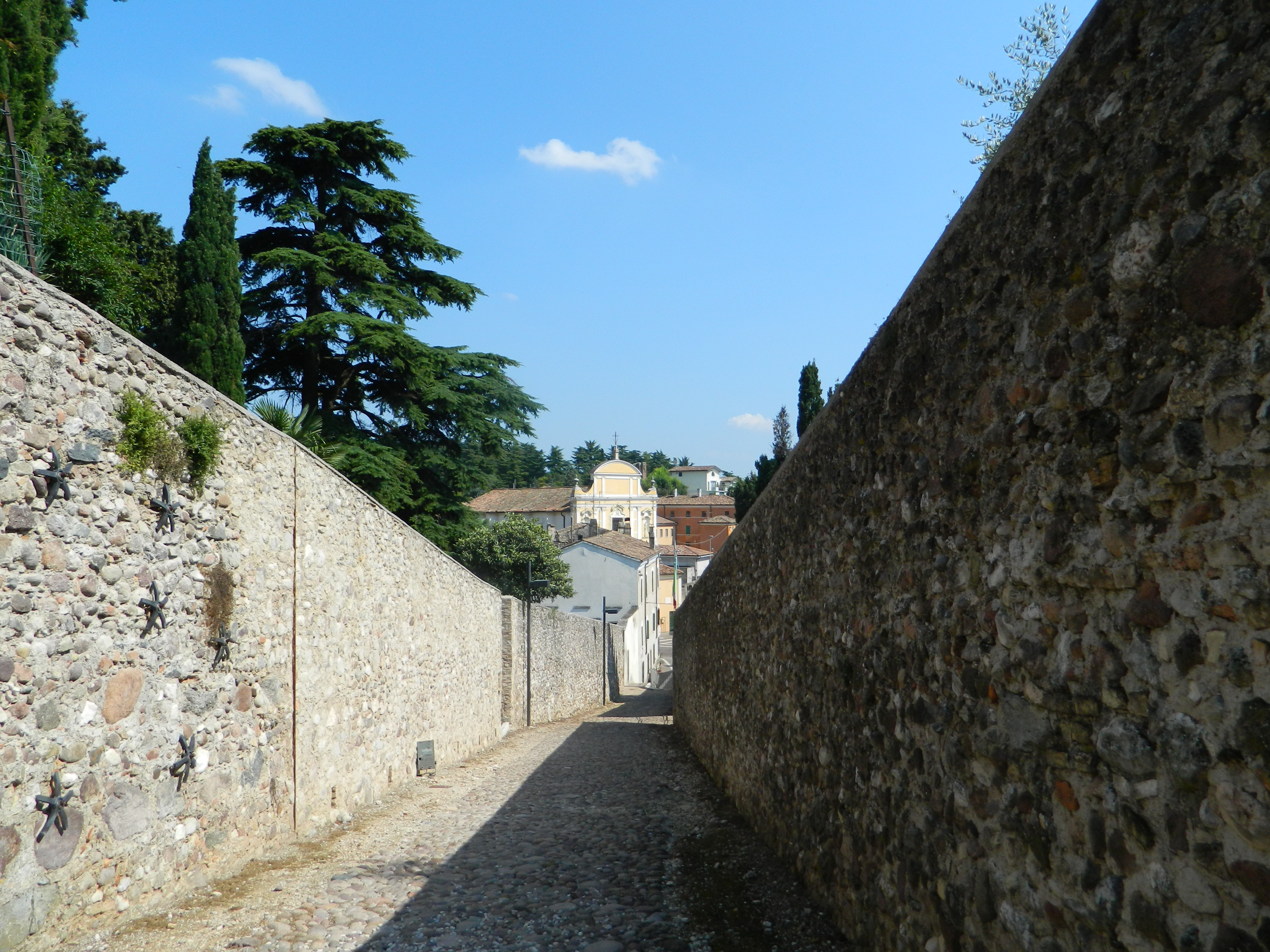
View from the ruins of the old castle towards the main square of Cavriana.

There are two main churches, the parish church of Santa Maria Nova - a Baroque building dedicated to the patron Saint Blaise - and a Pieve, a Romanic building dedicated to Saint Mary. Numerous oratories have been erected when Christianity spread in the area, as any small community built their own worship place.

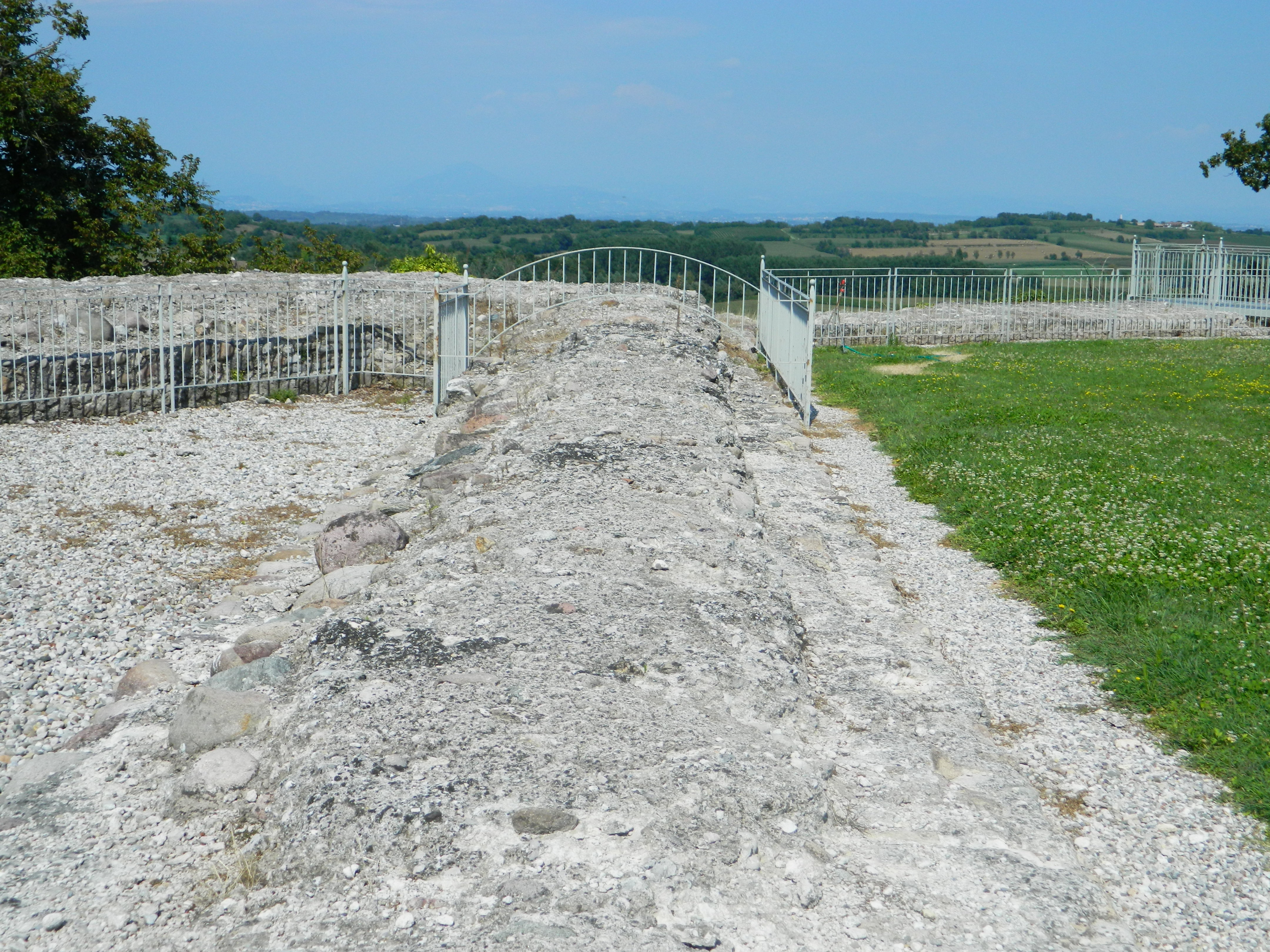
View from the ruins of the old castle towards the Alps and the Garda Lake.

The main historic buildings are Villa Mirra, which belonged to the Gonzaga family, and the ruins of the old castle, which was demolished around 1770 by the Austrians.

=== Unesco World Heritage Site ===
The hamlet of Bande is home to some prehistoric pile-dwelling (or stilt house) settlements. They were declared part of the World Heritage Site of Prehistoric pile dwellings around the Alps by UNESCO in 2011.

== Culture ==
=== Museums ===
There are two museums in Cavriana:

- the Museo archeologico dell'Alto Mantovano (Archeological Museum of the upper part of the Province of Mantua), which hosts a variety of archaeological findings and remains.
- the Museo Vecchio Mulino e Antichi Mestieri, home to a number of tools used in the area between 1800 and 1960.

=== Wines ===
Cavriana, as proven by the archaeological findings of the prehistoric era, has always been a territory with a vocation for wine. Today, the hills are covered by vineyards and some DOC wines are produced.

=== Palio della Capra d'Oro ===
The Palio della Capra d'Oro takes place in July and it was first held in 1998. The Palio is linked to the Renaissance period of the Gonzaga. It is a goat race (capra=goat) held once a year. A goat for each contrada has to complete a brief route and it is accompanied by a cavrer, usually a child, who cannot touch it, just call in order to be followed until the finish line. Before the race, people belonging to the different contrade parade toward the town center in Renaissance costumes. Each contrada has a specific colour: Villaggio (in yellow), San Rocco (in light blue), la Pieve (in violet), Castello (in bordeaux and white), Pozzone-Bande (in red and white), Scarnadore (in orange) and San Cassiano (in green). The winner of the race brings the prize to their own contrada: the Golden Goat (Capra d'Oro).

== See also ==
- Gonzaga
- Mantua
- Prehistoric pile dwellings around the Alps
- Lake Garda
