= Count of la Mejorada =

Countship of la Mejorada
- Creation date: 27 May 1617
- Created by: Philip III
- Peerage: Peerage of Spain
- First holder: Antonio de Padilla y Mendoza, 1st Count of la Mejorada
- Present holder: Andrea Cabeza de Vaca y McDaniel, 15th Countess of la Mejorada

Count of la Mejorada (Spanish: Conde de la Mejorada) is a hereditary title in the Peerage of Spain, granted in 1617 by Philip III to Antonio de Padilla, mayor of the fortresses of Martos and Alhama, two important enclaves of the Order of Calatrava during the Reconquista.

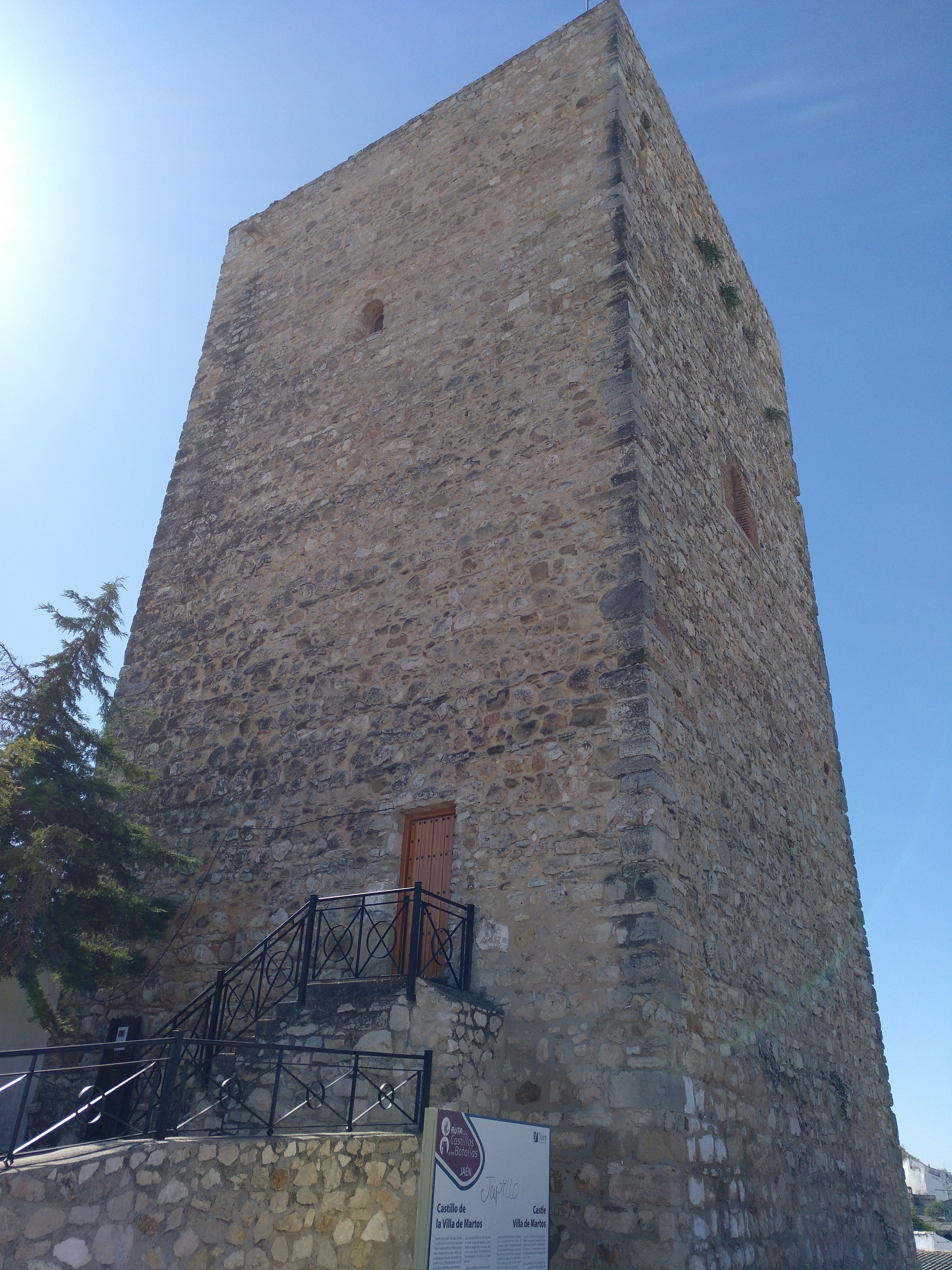
Tower at the fortress of Martos

== Counts of la Mejorada (1617) ==
- Antonio de Padilla y Mendoza, 1st Count of la Mejorada
- Ana de Sande y Padilla, 2nd Countess of la Mejorada
- Agustín de Portugal y Láncaster, 3rd Count of la Mejorada
- Juan Manuel de Láncaster y Noroña, 4th Count of la Mejorada
- Juan de Carvajal y Láncaster, 5th Count of la Mejorada
- Manuel Bernardino de Carvajal y Zúñiga, 6th Count of la Mejorada
- Ángel María de Carvajal y Gonzaga, 7th Count of la Mejorada
- Manuel Guillermo de Carvajal y Fernández de Córdoba, 8th Count of la Mejorada
- Ángel María de Carvajal y Fernández de Córdoba, 9th Count of la Mejorada
- Ángel María de Carvajal y Téllez-Girón, 10th Count of la Mejorada
- Ángela de Carvajal y Jiménez de Molina, 11th Countess of la Mejorada
- Antonio Cabeza de Vaca y Carvajal, 12th Count of la Mejorada
- Alfonso Cabeza de Vaca y Leighton, 13th Count of la Mejorada
- Antonio Alfonso Cabeza de Vaca y McDaniel, 14th Count of la Mejorada
- Andrea Cabeza de Vaca y McDaniel, 15th Countess of la Mejorada

== See also ==
- Marquess of Portago

== Bibliography ==
- Hidalgos de España, Real Asociación de (2018). Elenco de Grandezas y Títulos Nobiliarios Españoles. Ediciones Hidalguía. ISBN 978-84-94841-02-6.
