= Marquess of Portago =

Marquessate of Portago
- Creation date: 13 October 1744
- Created by: Philip V
- Peerage: Peerage of Spain
- First holder: José Gómez de Terán y Delgado, 1st Marquess of Portago
- Present holder: Theodora Cabeza de Vaca y Spier, 14th Marchioness of Portago

Marquess of Portago (Spanish: Marqués de Portago) is a hereditary title in the Peerage of Spain accompanied by the dignity of Grandee, granted in 1744 by Philip V to José Gómez de Terán y Delgado, Finance Treasurer and Council Minister of Spain.

== Marquesses of Portago (1744) ==
- José Gómez de Terán y Delgado, 1st Marquess of Portago (1686-1754)
- Francisco de Paula Gómez de Terán y García de La Madrid, 2nd Marquess of Portago (1730-1793), eldest son of the 1st Marquess
- José Gómez de Terán y Negrete, 3rd Marquess of Portago (d. 1801), eldest son of the 2nd Marquess
- Francisco Gómez de Terán y Negrete, 4th Marquess of Portago (1762-1816), second son of the 2nd Marquess
- Francisca Gómez de Terán y Negrete, 5th Marchioness of Portago (b. 1760), eldest daughter of the 2nd Marquess
- Vicente Cabeza de Vaca y Gómez de Terán, 6th Marquess of Portago (d. 1853), eldest son of the 5th Marchioness
- José Manuel Cabeza de Vaca y Morales, 7th Marquess of Portago (1819-1878), eldest son of the 6th Marquess
- Mariano Cabeza de Vaca y Morales, 8th Marquess of Portago (1821-1887), second son of the 6th Marquess
- Vicente Cabeza de Vaca y Fernández de Córdoba, 9th Marquess of Portago (1865-1921), eldest son of the 8th Marquess
- Antonio Cabeza de Vaca y Carvajal, 10th Marquess of Portago (1892-1941), eldest son of the 9th Marquess
- Alfonso Cabeza de Vaca y Leighton, 11th Marquess of Portago (1928-1957), eldest son of the 10th Marquess
- Antonio Alfonso Cabeza de Vaca y McDaniel, 12th Marquess of Portago (1954-1990), eldest son of the 11th Marquess
- Andrea Cabeza de Vaca y McDaniel, 13th Marchioness of Portago (b. 1951), eldest daughter of the 11th Marquess
- Theodora Cabeza de Vaca y Spier, 14th Marchioness of Portago (b. 1985), eldest daughter of the 12th Marquess

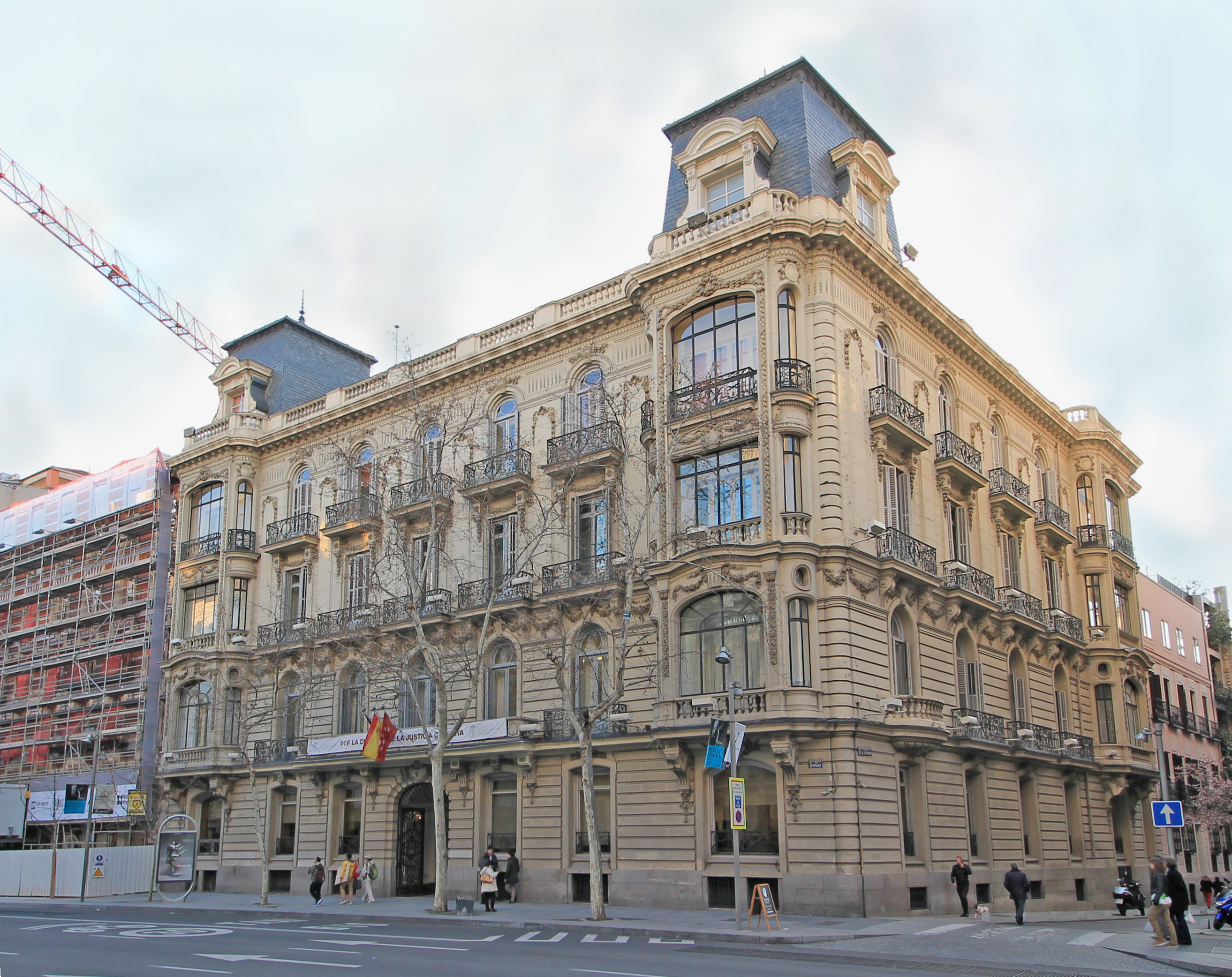
Palace of the Marquesses of Portago in Madrid

== See also ==
- List of current grandees of Spain
- Count of la Mejorada

== Bibliography ==
- Hidalgos de España, Real Asociación de (2018). Elenco de Grandezas y Títulos Nobiliarios Españoles. Ediciones Hidalguía. ISBN 978-84-94841-02-6.
