= Guidizzolo =

Guidizzolo Ghidisöl (Lombard)
- Comune
- Comune di Guidizzolo
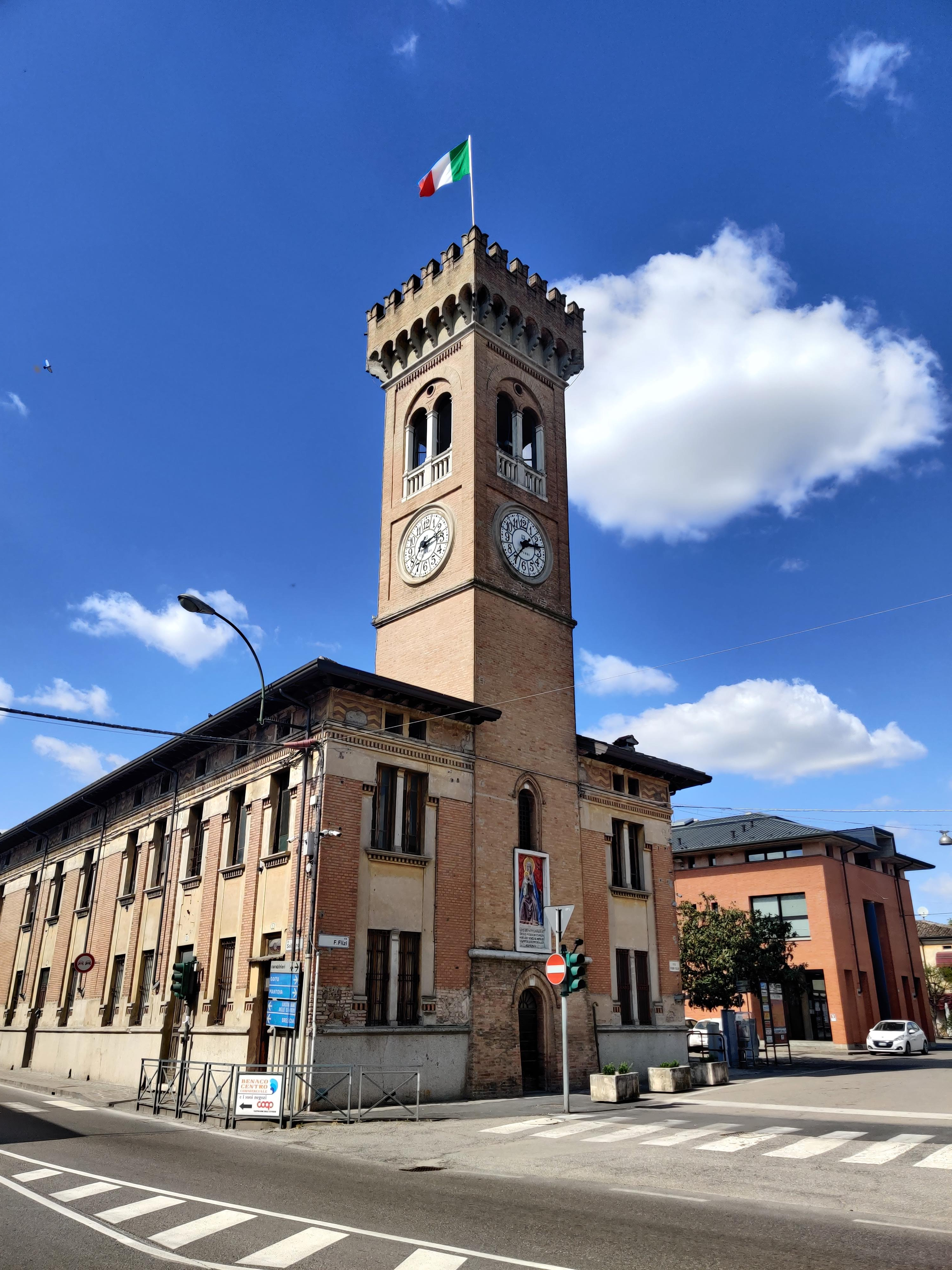
- St. Peter and Paul church

- Location within Italy Location within Lombardy
- Coordinates: 45°19′N 10°35′E
- Country: Italy
- Region: Lombardy
- Province: Mantua (MN)
- Frazioni: Birbesi, Rebecco, Selvarizzo

Government
  - Mayor: Stefano Meneghelli

Area
  - Total: 22.38 km^{2} (8.64 sq mi)
- Elevation: 46 m (151 ft)

Population (28 February 2017)
  - Total: 6,063
  - Density: 270.9/km^{2} (701.7/sq mi)
- Demonym: Guidizzolesi
- Time zone: UTC+1 (CET)
  - Summer (DST): UTC+2 (CEST)
- Postal code: 46040
- Dialing code: 0376
- Patron saint: Madonna of the Rosary
- Website: Official website

Guidizzolo (Upper Mantovano: Ghidisöl) is a comune (municipality) in the Province of Mantua in the Italian region Lombardy, located about 110 kilometres (68 mi) east of Milan and about 25 kilometres (16 mi) northwest of Mantua. The bordering municipalities of Guidizzolo are Cavriana, Ceresara, Goito, Medole and Solferino.

== Main sights ==
The most ancient edifice is the Oratory of St. Lawrence, a small Romanesque architecture devotional building dating from the 13th century.

== Location ==
The territory of Guidizzolo consists of the central core and three hamlets: Birbesi and Rebecco, located to the south-east, and Selvarizzo, located south-west of the main centre. It belongs to the sub-hilly area at the foot of the heights bordering Lake Garda towards the Po Valley.

The town is about 30 km from Mantua, 40 km from Brescia and Verona and 20 km from Lake Garda.

According to the Seismic Classification, the municipality belongs to zone 3 (medium-low seismicity).

The cycle path running along the Virgilio canal towpath makes it possible to retrace transversally - along the ideal east-west axis represented by the canal - a large portion of the foothills territory, from Guidizzolo to arrive near the Mincio river by connecting to the Mincio cycleway.

== Environment ==
Guidizzolo's climate is typical of the upper Po Valley of the temperate sub-continental type: winters are moderately harsh, with little rain and foggy days; summers are hot and muggy with thunderstorms; springs and autumns are generally rainy.

Climate classification: zone E 2428 62.

== Guidizzolo Tragedy ==
The road between Cerlongo and Guidizzolo, in the communal territory of Cavriana, was the location of Alfonso de Portago's fatal accident in the 1957 Mille Miglia, where 11 people died. A memorial at the roadside commemorates the event.

De Portago's 4.0-litre Ferrari 335 S blew a tyre and crashed into the roadside crowd while travelling at 250 kilometres per hour (160 mph). The crash killed the driver, the co-driver and nine spectators, including five children. Spinning out of control, the Ferrari hit a channel on the left side of the road, then veered back into the onlookers. Two of the dead children were hit by a concrete highway milestone that was ripped from the ground by the car and thrown into the crowd. The body of de Portago was in two sections, and co-driver Edmund Nelson was badly disfigured beneath the upside down vehicle.

Enzo Ferrari was charged with manslaughter in a criminal prosecution that was finally dismissed in 1961.
