= Mincio Cycleway =

Coordinates: 45.2190°N 10.7190°E

The Mincio Cycleway (or Peschiera-Mantua Cycleway) is a 43.5-kilometre (27.0 mi) segregated cycle track along the towpath of the River Mincio, connecting the lakeside towns of Peschiera del Garda and Mantua.

== Description ==
The facility is a two-way cycle track with a minor gradient. Completed in 2006 and entirely paved, it spans one of the four lengths of the fortified quadrangle created under Austrian rule during the first half of the 19th century. The cycleway is intended for bicycle touring. Heading southwards, it starts near the Peschiera del Garda railway viaduct, on the right bank of the Mincio, passing over to the left bank just before the village of Monzambano, near the Salionze dam. Shortly after this the castle of Valeggio sul Mincio, once a stronghold of the Veronese Scaligers, comes into view. This is followed by Borghetto sul Mincio, a settlement distinguished by its many watermills and the Ponte visconteo, a bridge erected by the Milanese House of Visconti. From here it continues, still along the Mincio, as far as Pozzolo, where an alternative route leads to Volta Mantovana. The track then veers away from the river, along the canals of the Mantuan plains. After approximately 40 km it reaches the historic city of Mantua. Although the railway station is within easy reach, visitors are advised to continue along the cycling and pedestrian track which runs along the Lago di mezzo (Middle Lake, one of the three basins formed by the Mincio, which wraps around the city), as far as the Ducal Palace, the very heart of town. The cycleway is clearly signposted all the way and offers several rest stops with facilities. It is particularly popular in springtime (see the stats below).

=== Route ===
The cycleway stars near the Peschiera del Garda railway viaduct, and follows the course of the Mincio to Pozzolo. From there, it follows the canals of the Mantuan plains until it reaches the Lago di Mezzo in Mantua. The cycleway is clearly marked with signposts along its route, and offers several rest stops with facilities.
