= Slavery in Portugal =

Slavery in Portugal existed since before the country's formation. During the pre-independence period, inhabitants of the current Portuguese territory were often enslaved and they enslaved others. After independence, during the existence of the Kingdom of Portugal, the country played a leading role in the Atlantic slave trade, which involved the mass trade and transportation of enslaved people from Africa and other parts of the world to the Americas. The import of black enslaved people was banned in European Portugal in 1761 by the Marquis of Pombal, and at the same time, the trade of black enslaved people to Brazil was encouraged, with the support and direct involvement of the Marquis. Slavery in Portugal was only abolished in 1869, but with the banning of the trade itself happening in 1836–1842.

The Atlantic slave trade began circa 1336 or 1341, when Portuguese traders brought the first Canarian slaves to Europe. In 1526, Portuguese mariners carried the first shipload of Africans to Brazil in the Americas, establishing the triangular Atlantic slave trade.

== History ==
=== Ancient era ===
Slavery was a major economic and social institution in Europe during the classical era and a great deal is known about the ancient Greeks and Romans in relation to the topic. Rome added Portugal to its empire (2nd century BC), the latter a province of Lusitania at the time. The details of slavery in ancient Roman Lusitania are not well-known; however, there were several forms of slavery, including enslaved miners and domestic servants.

=== Visigothic and Suebi kingdoms ===
The Visigoths and the Suebi (Germanic tribes), of the 5th century AD, seized control of the Iberian Peninsula as the Roman Empire fell. At the time, Portugal did not exist as a separate kingdom, but was primarily a part of the Visigothic Iberian kingdom (the Visigothic ruling class lived apart and heavily taxed the native population). However, during this period, a gradual transition to feudalism and serfdom was occurring throughout Europe.

=== Islamic Iberia ===
After the Umayyad conquest of Hispania in the 8th century, in which Moors from North Africa crossed the Strait of Gibraltar and defeated the Visigothic rulers of Iberia, the territory of both modern-day Portugal and Spain fell under Islamic control. The pattern of slavery and serfdom in the Iberian Peninsula differs from the rest of Western Europe due to the Islamic conquest. They established Moorish kingdoms in Iberia, including the area that is occupied by modern Portugal. Islamic Ibera became known as al-Andalus.

Al-Andalus was described in the Muslim world as the "land of jihad" or dar al-harb, a religious border land in a state of constant war with the infidels (kafir), which by Islamic Law was a legitimate zone for enslavement, and slaves were termed as coming from three different zones in Christian Iberia: Galicians from the northwest, Basques or Vascones from the central north, and Franks from the northeast and France.

Trade ties between the Moorish kingdoms and the North African Moorish state led to a greater flow of trade within those geographical areas. In addition, the Moors engaged sections of Spaniards and Portuguese Christians in slave labor. The Moors used ethnic European slaves: 1/12 of Iberian population were slave Europeans, less than 1% of Iberia were Moors and more than 99% were native Iberians. Periodic Arab and Moorish raiding expeditions were sent from Islamic Iberia to ravage the remaining Christian Iberian kingdoms, bringing back stolen goods and slaves.

The medieval Iberian Peninsula was the scene of episodic warfare among Muslims and Christians during the reconquista. Periodic raiding expeditions were sent from Al-Andalus to ravage the Christian Iberian kingdoms, bringing back booty and people. For example, in a raid on Lisbon in 1189 the Almohad caliph Yaqub al-Mansur took 3,000 female and child captives, and his governor of Córdoba took 3,000 Christian slaves in a subsequent attack upon Silves in 1191. In the Almohad raid to Evora in Portugal in 1181–82, 400 women were taken captives and put for sale in the slave market of Seville. The governor of Córdoba, in a subsequent attack upon Silves, held 3,000 Christian slaves in 1191. In addition, the Christian Iberians who lived within Arab and Moorish-ruled territories were subject to specific laws and taxes for state protection.

=== Reconquista ===
Muslim Moors who converted to Christianity, known as Moriscos, were enslaved by the Portuguese during the Reconquista; 9.3 per cent of slaves in southern Portugal were Moors and many Moors were enslaved in 16th-century Portugal. It has been documented that other slaves were treated better than Moriscos, the slaves were less than 1% of population.

After the Reconquista period, Moorish slaves began to outnumber Slavic slaves in both importance and numbers in Portugal.

=== Age of Discovery ===
==== Background ====
===== Origins of slavery in the Iberian peninsula =====
The prolonged conflicts between Moors and Christians on the Iberian Peninsula, driven by struggles for survival, laid the groundwork for the emergence of slavery as a byproduct of relentless violence. This historical context set the stage for Portugal's slave trade, which began out of economic and military necessities and expanded gradually. By the early 15th century, southern Portugal faced severe labor shortages in its sugarcane fields, causing escalating labor costs and prompting complaints from landowners as farmers abandoned the land. This economic strain led to the arrival of the first ship carrying captives from the Sahara coast in 1441, marking the integration of Moorish slaves as an essential labor force in Portuguese agriculture and spurring the development of slavery laws.

===== Slavery in Islamic military campaigns =====
Centuries earlier, during the 11th to 13th centuries, the Almoravid and Almohad invasions of Iberia introduced another dimension to slavery, with non-Islamized West African Black slaves imported as soldiers and organized into military units. This practice was underpinned by figures like Islamic scholar Ibn Khaldun (1332–1406), who dehumanized Black slaves by likening them to animals, providing a racial justification for their enslavement. Similarly, Islamic states highly valued Christian slaves as prized spoils of war, often noting that those redeemed through ransom returned profoundly altered, stripped of individuality and autonomy.

===== Economic pressures and the rise of the slave trade =====
Meanwhile, Portugal's own system of serfdom was waning by the 13th century, with peasants enjoying unrestricted mobility, reflecting a shift in labor dynamics that contrasted with the growing reliance on enslaved labor. This evolving economic landscape culminated in Portugal's 1415 conquest of Ceuta, a Muslim city in Morocco, which, while failing to secure control over Moroccan wheat production, proved a pivotal moment in expanding Portuguese maritime dominance, further intertwining slavery with the nation's economic and imperial ambitions.

Enslaved people from Africa prior to 1441 were predominately Berbers and Arabs from the North African Barbary Coast, known as "Moors" to the Iberians. They were typically enslaved during wars and conquests between Christian and Islamic kingdoms. The first Portuguese raids (around 1336) in search of loot and people to enslave took place in the Canary Islands, inhabited by a pagan people of Berber origin, the Guanches, who resisted bravely.

===== Strategic disruption of the Moorish slave trade =====
In the early 15th century, purchasing slaves primarily meant rescuing Christians enslaved by Muslim conquests. The military activities of Islamic states were closely tied to the slave trade, and weakening slave traders was seen as a way to undermine Moorish conquerors' military power. To break the Moorish monopoly on the slave trade, Portugal outlawed the enslavement of Christians and banned the trade of non-Christian slaves handled by Moorish traders. As part of its military strategy, Portugal encouraged its citizens and allied pagans to purchase slaves, aligning economic actions with efforts to weaken Muslim dominance.

==== African slaves ====
The illegal Portuguese slave ship Diligenté with 600 slaves onboard, May 1838

The first expeditions of Sub-Saharan Africa were sent out by Prince Infante D. Henrique, known commonly today as Henry the Navigator, with the intent to probe how far the kingdoms of the Moors and their power reached. The expeditions sent by Henry came back with black people to enslave as a way to compensate for the expenses of their voyages. The enslavement of black people was seen as a military campaign because the people that the Portuguese encountered were identified as Moorish and thus associated with Islam. The royal chronicler Gomes Eanes de Zurara was never decided on the "Moorishness" of those brought back from Africa, due to a seeming lack of contact with Islam. Slavery in Portugal and the number of enslaved people expanded after the Portuguese began an exploration of Sub-Saharan Africa.

Prince Infante D. Henrique began selling enslaved African people in Lagos in 1444. In 1455, Pope Nicholas V gave Portugal the rights to continue the slave trade in West Africa, under the provision that they convert all people who are enslaved. The Portuguese soon expanded their trade along the whole west coast of Africa. Infante D Henrique held the monopoly on all expeditions to Africa granted by the crown until his death in 1460. Afterward, any ship sailing for Africa required authorization from the crown. All slaves and goods brought back to Portugal were subject to duties and tariffs. Enslaved people were baptized before shipment. Their process of enslavement, which was viewed by critics as cruel, was justified by the conversion of the enslaved to Christianity.

The high demand for enslaved people was due to a shortage of laborers in Portuguese colonies such as Brazil, Cape Verde, Angola and Mozambique. Records of both royal institutions responsible for the sale of black enslaved people, the Casa de Guiné and the Casa dos Escravos were damaged during the earthquake of 1755 in Lisbon, and the fiscal records containing the numbers and sales of these companies were destroyed. The records of the royal chronicler Zurara claim that 927 African slaves were brought to Portugal between 1441 and 1448.

Around 1500, because of Portugal's small population, Portuguese colonization of the new world was only possible with a large number of slaves they had acquired to be shipped overseas. In the late 15th and into the 16th centuries, the Portuguese economic reliance on slaves was less in question than the sheer number of slaves found in Portugal. People wishing to purchase slaves in Portugal had two sources, the royal slaving company, the Casa da Guiné, or from slave merchants who had purchased their slaves through the Casa de Guiné to sell as retail. There were up to 70 slave merchants in Lisbon in the 1550s. Slave auctions occurred in the town or market square, or in the streets of central Lisbon. The sale of slaves was compared by observers as similar to the sale of horses or livestock. The laws of commerce regarding slavery address them as merchandise or objects. There was a period of time set upon purchase for the buyer to decide if he is happy with the slave he had purchased.

The occupations of enslaved people varied widely. Some enslaved people in Lisbon could find themselves working in domestic settings, but most worked hard labor in the mines and metal forges, while others worked at the docks loading and maintaining ships. Some worked peddling cheap goods at the markets and returning the profits to their masters. Opportunities for enslaved people were scarce. Enslaved women could be freed if their masters chose to marry them, but this was only common in the colonies. When Lisbon was on the verge of being invaded in 1580, enslaved people were promised their freedom in exchange for their military service. 440 slaves took the offer and most, after being freed, left Portugal. Slavery did little to alter society in Portugal, due to the slight ease of enslaved people's integration; those who did not assimilate were treated similarly to the poor with most being shipped to Brazil to work in the sugar cane plantation.

===== Trans-Atlantic slave trade database =====
The Trans-Atlantic Slave Trade Database (TSTD), compiled over 40 years by historians Stephen Behrendt, David Eltis, David Richardson, and Manolo Florentino, is considered the most recent and reliable source for African slave trade statistics. Comprising data from 36,000 slave trade voyages, it covers over 80% of such voyages and is highly regarded in peer-reviewed academic journals for its rigorous research.

The Trans-Atlantic Slave Trade Database (TSTD)
	Spain / Uruguay	Portugal / Brazil	Great Britain	Netherlands	U.S.A.	Total
1501-1550	31,738	32,387	0	0	0	64,125
1551-1600	88,223	121,804	1,922	1,365	0	213,380
1601-1650	127,089	469,128	33,695	33,528	824	667,894
1651-1700	18,461	542,064	394,567	186,373	3,327	1,207,738
1701-1750	0	1,011,143	964,639	156,911	37,281	2,560,634
1751-1800	10,654	1,201,860	1,580,658	173,103	152,023	3,933,984
1801-1850	568,815	2,460,570	283,959	3,026	111,395	3,647,971

==== Asians ====
After the Portuguese first made contact with Japan in 1543, a large-scale slave trade developed in the Nanban trade, one of the Portuguese trade includes the Portuguese purchase of Japanese that sold them to various locations overseas, including Portugal itself, the Nanban trade existed throughout the 16th and 17th centuries. Many documents mention the large slave trade along with protests against the enslavement of Japanese. Japanese slaves are believed to be the first of their nation to end up in Europe, and the Portuguese purchased large numbers of Japanese slave girls to bring to Portugal for sexual purposes, as noted by the Church in 1555. King Sebastian feared that it was having a negative effect on Catholic proselytization since the slave trade in Japanese was growing to large proportions, so he commanded that it be banned in 1571. Records of three Japanese slaves dating from the 16th century, named Gaspar Fernandes, Miguel and Ventura who ended up in Mexico showed that they were purchased by Portuguese slave traders in Japan, brought to Manila from where they were shipped to Mexico by their owner Perez.

More than several hundred Japanese, especially women, were sold as slaves. Portuguese visitors so often engaged in slavery in Japan and occasionally South Asian and African crew members were taken to Macau and other Portuguese colonies in Southeast Asia, the Americas, and India, where there was a community of Japanese slaves and traders in Goa by the early 17th century, many of whom became prostitutes. Enslaved Japanese women were even occasionally sold as concubines to black African crew members, along with their European counterparts serving on Portuguese ships trading in Japan, mentioned by Luis Cerqueira, a Portuguese Jesuit, in a 1598 document. Hideyoshi blamed the Portuguese and Jesuits for this slave trade and banned Christian proselytizing as a result. Historians have noted, however, that anti-Portuguese propaganda was actively promoted by the Japanese, particularly with regards to the Portuguese purchases of Japanese women for sexual purposes.

Some Korean slaves were bought by the Portuguese and brought to Portugal from Japan, where they had been among the tens of thousands of Korean prisoners of war transported to Japan during the Japanese invasions of Korea. Historians pointed out that at the same time Hideyoshi expressed his indignation and outrage at the Portuguese trade in Japanese slaves, he himself was engaging in a mass slave trade of Korean prisoners of war in Japan. Chinese were bought in large numbers as slaves by the Portuguese in the 1520s. Japanese Christian daimyos mainly responsible for selling to the Portuguese their fellow Japanese. Japanese women and Japanese men, Javanese, Chinese, and Indians were all sold as slaves in Portugal.

===== Chinese =====
Some Chinese slaves in Spain ended up there after being brought to Lisbon, Portugal, and sold when they were boys. Tristán de la China was a Chinese who was taken as a slave by the Portuguese, while he was still a boy and in the 1520s was obtained by Cristobál de Haro in Lisbon, and taken to live in Seville and Valladolid. He was paid for his service as a translator in the 1525 Loaísa expedition, during which he was still an adolescent. The survivors, including Tristan, were shipwrecked for a decade until 1537 when they were brought back by a Portuguese ship to Lisbon.

There are records of Chinese slaves in Lisbon as early as 1540. According to modern historians, the first known visit of a Chinese person to Europe dates to 1540 (or soon after), when a Chinese scholar, apparently enslaved by Portuguese raiders somewhere on the southern China coast, was brought to Portugal. Purchased by João de Barros, he worked with the Portuguese historian on translating Chinese texts into Portuguese.

In 16th-century southern Portugal there were Chinese slaves but the number of them was described as "negligible", being outnumbered by East Indian, Mourisco, and African slaves. Amerindians, Chinese, Malays, and Indians were slaves in Portugal but in far fewer number than Turks, Berbers, and Arabs. China and Malacca were origins of slaves delivered to Portugal by Portuguese viceroys. A testament from 23 October 1562 recorded a Chinese man named António who was enslaved and owned by a Portuguese woman, Dona Maria de Vilhena, a wealthy noblewoman in Évora. António was among the three most common male names given to male slaves in Évora. D. Maria owned one of the only two Chinese slaves in Évora and she specifically selected and used him from among the slaves she owned to drive her mules for her because he was Chinese since rigorous and demanding tasks were assigned to Mourisco, Chinese, and Indian slaves. D. Maria's owning a Chinese, three Indians, and three Mouriscos among her fifteen slaves reflected on her high social status, since Chinese, Mouriscos, and Indians were among the ethnicities of prized slaves and were very expensive compared to blacks, so high class individuals owned these ethnicities and it was because her former husband Simão was involved in the slave trade in the east that she owned slaves of many different ethnicities. When she died, D. Maria freed twelve of her slaves including this Chinese man in her testament, leaving them with sums from 20,000 to 10,000 réis in money. D. Maria de Vilhena was the daughter of the nobleman and explorer Sancho de Tovar, the capitão of Sofala (List of colonial governors of Mozambique), and she was married twice, the first marriage to the explorer Cristóvão de Mendonça, and her second marriage was to Simão da Silveira, capitão of Diu (Lista de governadores, capitães e castelões de Diu). D. Maria was left a widow by Simão, and she was a major slave owner, possessing the most slaves in Évora, with her testament recording fifteen slaves.

A legal case was brought before the Spanish Council of the Indies in the 1570s, involving two Chinese men in Seville, one of them a freeman, Esteban Cabrera, and the other a slave, Diego Indio, against Juan de Morales, Diego's owner. Diego called on Esteban to give evidence as a witness on his behalf. Diego recalled that he was taken as a slave by Francisco de Casteñeda from Mexico, to Nicaragua, then to Lima in Peru, then to Panama, and eventually to Spain via Lisbon, while he was still a boy.

Chinese boys were kidnapped from Macau and sold as slaves in Lisbon while they were still children. Brazil imported some of Lisbon's Chinese slaves. Fillippo Sassetti saw some Chinese and Japanese slaves in Lisbon among the large slave community in 1578, although most of the slaves were blacks. Brazil and Portugal were both recipients of Chinese slaves bought by Portuguese. Portugal exported to Brazil some Chinese slaves. Military, religious, and civil service secretarial work and other lenient and light jobs were given to Chinese slaves while hard labor was given to Africans. Only African slaves in 1578 Lisbon outnumbered the large numbers of Japanese and Chinese slaves in the same city. Some of the Chinese slaves were sold in Brazil, a Portuguese colony. Cooking was the main profession of Chinese slaves around 1580 in Lisbon, according to Fillippo Sassetti from Florence and the Portuguese viewed them as diligent, smart, and "loyal".

The Portuguese also valued Oriental slaves more than the black Africans and the Moors for their rarity. Chinese slaves were more expensive than Moors and blacks and showed off the high status of the owner The Portuguese attributed qualities like intelligence and industriousness to Chinese slaves. Traits such as high intelligence were ascribed to Chinese, Indian, and Japanese slaves.

In 1595, a law was passed by Portugal banning the selling and buying of Chinese and Japanese slaves due to hostility from the Chinese and Japanese regarding the trafficking in Japanese and Chinese slaves On 19 February 1624, the King of Portugal forbade the enslavement of Chinese people of either sex.

===== Others =====
A Portuguese woman, Dona Ana de Ataíde owned an Indian man named António as a slave in Évora. He served as a cook for her. Ana de Ataíde's Indian slave escaped from her in 1587. A large number of slaves were forcibly brought there since the commercial, artisanal, and service sectors all flourished in a regional capital like Évora.

A fugitive Indian slave from Evora named António went to Badajoz after leaving his master in 1545.

Portuguese domination was accepted by the "docile" Jau slaves. In Évora, Brites Figueira owned a Javanese (Jau) slave named Maria Jau. Antão Azedo took an Indian slave named Heitor to Evora, who along with another slave was from Bengal were among the 34 Indian slaves in total who were owned by Tristão Homem, a nobleman in 1544 in Évora. Manuel Gomes previously owned a slave who escaped in 1558 at age 18 and he was said to be from the "land of Prester John of the Indias" named Diogo.

In Évora, men were owned and used as slaves by female establishments like convents for nuns. Three male slaves and three female slaves were given to the nuns of Montemor by the alcaide-mor's widow. In order to "serve those who serve God" and being told to obey orders "in all things that they ordered them", a boy named Manual along with his slave mother were given to the Nuns of Montemor by father Jorge Fernandes in 1544. A capelão do rei, father João Pinto left an Indian man in Porto, where he was picked up in 1546 by the Évora-based Santa Marta convent's nuns to serve as their slave. However, female slaves did not serve in male establishments, unlike vice versa.

=== Slavery in Macau and the coast of China ===
Beginning in the 16th century, the Portuguese tried to establish trading ports and settlements along the coast of China. Early attempts at establishing such bases, such as those in Ningbo and Quanzhou, were however destroyed by the Chinese, following violent raids by the settlers to neighboring ports, which included pillaging and plunder and sometimes enslavement. The resulting complaints made it to the province's governor who commanded the settlement destroyed and the inhabitants wiped out. In 1545, a force of 60,000 Chinese troops descended on the community, and 800 of the 1,200 Portuguese residents were massacred, with 25 vessels and 42 junks destroyed.

Until the mid-17th century, during the early Portuguese mandate of Macau, some 5,000 slaves lived in the territory, in addition to 2,000 Portuguese and an ever-growing number of Chinese, which in 1664 reached 20,000. This number decreased in the following decades to between 1,000 and 2,000. Most of the slaves were of African origin. Rarely did Chinese women marry Portuguese, initially, mostly Goans, Ceylonese/Sinhalese (from today's Sri Lanka), Indochinese, Malay (from Malacca), and Japanese women were the wives of the Portuguese men in Macau. Slave women of Indian, Indonesian, Malay, and Japanese origin were used as partners by Portuguese men. Japanese girls would be purchased in Japan by Portuguese men. From 1555 onwards, Macau received slave women of Timorese origin as well as women of African origin, and from Malacca and India. Macau was permitted by Pombal to receive an influx of Timorese women. Macau received an influx of African slaves, Japanese slaves as well as Christian Korean slaves who were bought by the Portuguese from the Japanese after they were taken prisoner during the Japanese invasions of Korea in the era of Hideyoshi.

On 24 June 1622, the Dutch attacked Macau in the Battle of Macau, expecting to turn the area into a Dutch possession, with an 800-strong invasion force led by under Captain Kornelis Reyerszoon. The relatively small number of defenders repulsed the Dutch attack, which was not repeated. The majority of the defenders were Africans slaves, with only a few dozen Portuguese soldiers and priests in support, and they accounted for most of the victims in the battle. Following the defeat, the Dutch Governor Jan Coen said of the Macao slaves, that "it was they who defeated and drove away our people there". In China during the 19th century, the British consul to China noted that some Portuguese merchants were still buying children between five and eight years of age.

In 1814, the Jiaqing Emperor added a clause to the section of the fundamental laws of China titled "Wizards, Witches, and all Superstitions, prohibited", later modified in 1821 and published in 1826 by the Daoguang Emperor, which sentenced Europeans, namely Portuguese Christians who would not repent their conversion, to be sent to Muslim cities in Xinjiang as slaves to Muslim leaders.

=== Treatment ===
==== Black Slaves in the Early Modern Era ====
===== Employment and living conditions =====
Except for the very poorest members of society all classes of people in early modern Portugal, from kings to prostitutes, were known to own slaves. Slaves worked as domestic servants, labourers and artisans, with some employed on ships and in agriculture. As such their lives might not have been dissimilar to those of white lower classes at the time who were subject to the same laws and moral standards and many were also dependent on a master for food, clothes and lodging, moreover a master had a right of corporal punishment over anyone in his household: slave or free.

Slaves in Portugal wore European clothing, both to cope with the sometimes harsh winters and because it was seen as a necessity by the Portuguese to uphold the standards of a "proper Christian life". The clothing worn was dictated by the form of employment as was comparable to that worked by white Portuguese in similar work. Those who worked as servants might be provided with bright, high quality clothing: the employment of liviered servants became a commonplace practice in Europe from the Medieval era onwards such practices were seen not only as a form of 'conspicuous consumption' that reflected the status, and social position of the employer but also served as means to reinforce and distinguish members of the social hierarchy. Not all slaves were as lucky, sometimes slaves reduced to begging, or theft, in order to obtain food and clothing (as also evidenced by a law of 1538 that forbade slaves to beg).

What ultimately distinguished slaves from free servants was their status of slaves: others might be equally as dependent on a master but were free to leave their employment. Under laws slaves were their masters possessions for life, unless freed or sold. This "meant that their bodies were far more under their masters' control, and more open to physical and sexual abuse than those of free servants". It was this, alongside cultural practices and speech patterns that revealed traces of their African origins, as well as the obvious marker of skin colour, that marked them out as a distinct community from the white Portuguese lower classes.

===== Religion =====
Though Christianity proved the legal and moral justification of the slave trade the Church remained largely unconcerned with the spiritual welfare of slaves until the Council of Trent. Attempts to convert slaves did not take place until 70 years after they first arrived in Portugal and as late as 1493 the Portuguese king, Joao II, owned unbaptised slaves.

In 1593 King D. Manuel wrote to Pope Leo X expressing his distress that many of the slaves brought to Lisbon died before they were baptised. How sincere he was is doubted, his concern might have been primarily driven by a need to demonstrate piety so that the pope would grant him increased control over the church. The effectiveness of the measures he undertook is also in doubt since in 1553 the royal secretary was complaining of the large numbers of slaves sold in Lisbon who died before being baptised..

Conversion of slaves resident in Portugal may have had better results. D. Manuel issued an order, in 1514, that their masters had to ensure that their masters had to ensure that all adult slaves had to be baptised within six months of landing. However slaves over 10 years could refuse baptism. Children under 10 had to be baptised within 1 month of landing and infants were to be baptised at the same time as other children of the parish. Doubts exist as to how well this was enforced since the Archbishop of Lisbon, in 1568, ordered all masters to baptise slave children over the age of seven. It is clear though that many accepted and even embraced Christianity, taking part in religious ceremonies, forming lay orders an even taking holy orders. Black slaves also showed up in confirmation records as adults. This belief could form a path to cultural assimilation though contemporary reports indicate that the religious practices of slaves contained aspects of their African heritage. In 1633 a Capuchin friar described a religious celebration where participants were dressed in African clothing and processed to the sound of African Instruments..

Religious fraternities played an important part in black lives, though there were limits on how slaves, compared to free blacks, could join. They provided a means of mutual support and self-governance and were recognised as representing their communities. Though often lacking in funds, religious fraternities were known to seek manumission for their members.

===== Punishment and legal status =====
During transport to Portugal, enslaved people were fastened and chained with manacles, padlocks, and rings around their necks. Portuguese owners could whip, chain, and pour burning hot wax and fat onto the skin of their slaves, and punish their slaves in any way that they wished, as long as the slaves remained alive. The Portuguese also used branding irons to brand their slaves as property.

There is little evidence on how (black) slaves were treated and punished, including rape and sexual abuse, except in as much can be drawn from comparing birth records (which do not record the name of the father) and the rise marriages among slaves after the Council of Trent, though contemporary observers generally agreed that black slaves were treated better than Moors.

Under Portuguese laws slaves where considered chattel, i.e. personal property and could thus be sold, pawned or used for a ransom or security for a debt. The law did grant slaves the right to life, unless condemned to death in law. This corresponded to popular belief though there in no evidence that anyone was ever executed for killing a slave. Care must be taken in interpreting this since was a form of discrimination common to all the lower classes.

Portuguese custom recognised manumission i.e. the freeing of a slave. This was undertaken by the legal instrument of a carta de alforria, or letter of manumission. Slave could be freed by their master during the masters lifetime or in his will. Manumission could also be achieved through purchase with a slave's masters consent, typically for the slaves market value. Slaves were sometimes left sums of money in order to effect this, otherwise they could pay for this themselves, though slaves were able to obtain money through trading, obtaining enough money would take many years.

=== Banning ===
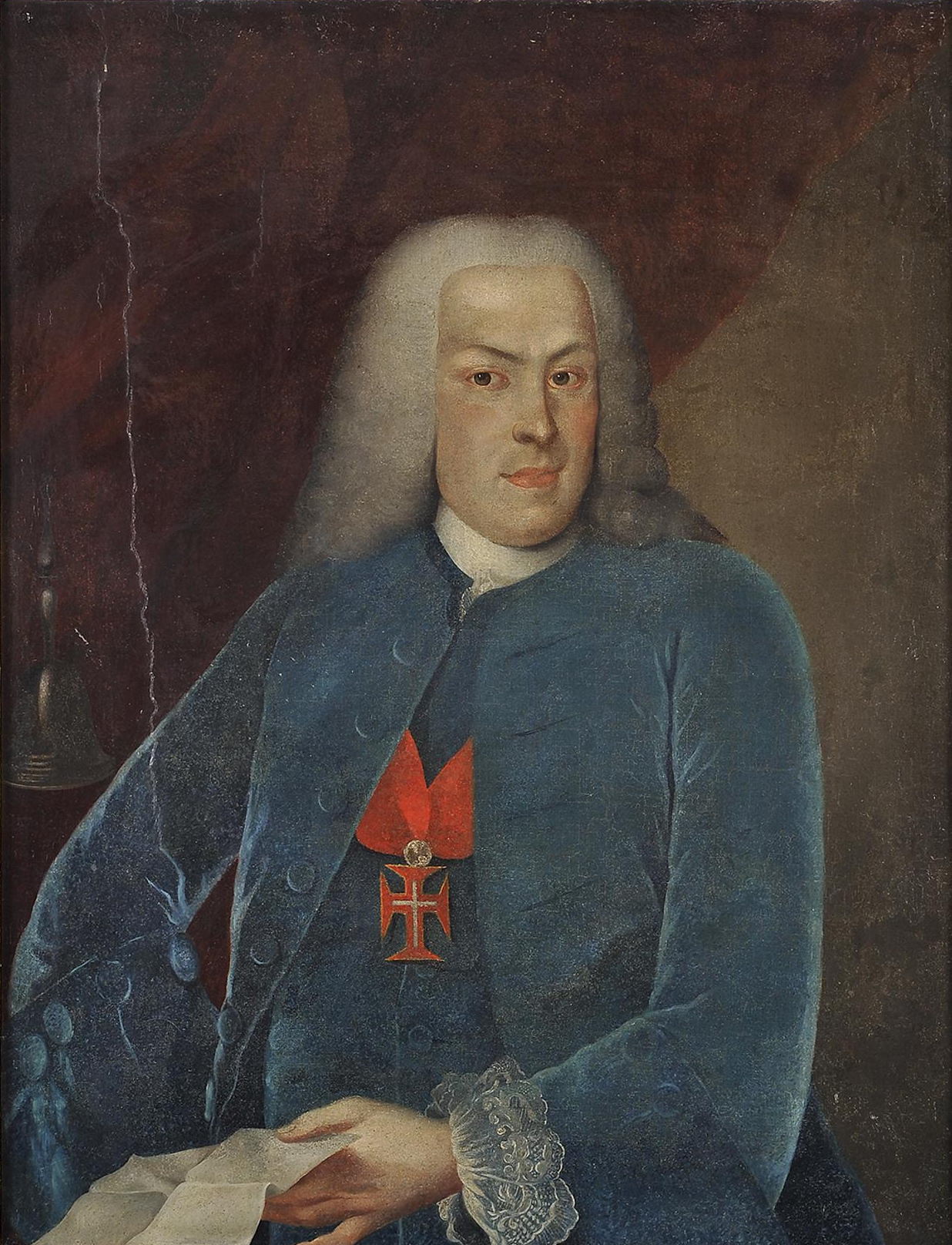
The Marquis of Pombal (pictured), who forbade the importation of African slaves to Portugal and Portuguese India in 1761

Voices condemning the slave trade were raised early during the Atlantic slave trade period. Among them was Gaspar da Cruz, a Dominican friar who dismissed any arguments by the slave traffickers that they had "legally" purchased already-enslaved children, among the earliest condemnations of slavery in Europe during this period.

From an early age during the Atlantic slave trade period, the crown attempted to stop the trading of non-African slaves. The enslavement and overseas trading of Chinese slaves, who the Portuguese prized, was specifically addressed in response to Chinese authorities' requests, who, although not against the enslavement of people in Macau and Chinese territories, which was common practice, at different times attempted to stop the transport of slaves outside the territory. In 1595, a Portuguese royal decree banned the selling and buying of ethnically Chinese slaves; it was reiterated by the Portuguese king on 19 February 1624, and, in 1744, by the Qianlong Emperor, who forbade the practice to Chinese subjects, reiterating his order in 1750. However, these laws were not able to stop the trade completely, a practice which lasted until the 1700s. In the American colonies, Portugal halted the use of Chinese, Japanese, Europeans, and Indians to work as slaves for sugar plantations, which was reserved exclusively for African slaves.

In 1761, the Marquis of Pombal banned the importation of African slaves to Portugal and Portuguese India; this however was not intended as an anti-slavery measure, but to ensure the slaves went to Brazil instead. Portugal abolished its involvement in the Atlantic slave trade in 1836, primarily due to Brazil becoming independent and British diplomatic pressure. Finally, in 1869, slavery was abolished for good in the Portuguese Empire.

== See also ==
- Al-Andalus
- Atlantic slave trade
- Barbary slave trade
- Barbary pirates
- Economic history of Portugal
- Slavery in ancient Rome
- Slavery in Angola
- Slavery in Brazil
- Slavery in China
- Slavery in India

== Bibliography ==
- Dias, Maria Suzette Fernandes (2007), Legacies of slavery: comparative perspectives, Cambridge Scholars Publishing, p. 238, ISBN 978-1-84718-111-4
- Ehalt, Rômulo da Silva (2018). Jesuits and the problem of slavery in early modern Japan (PDF) (PhD thesis). Tokyo University of Foreign Studies. doi:10.15026/91848.
- Ehalt, Rômulo (2023). "Geninka and Slavery: Jesuit Casuistry and Tokugawa Legislation on Japanese Bondage (1590s–1620s)" (PDF). Itinerario. 47 (3): 342–356. doi:10.1017/S0165115323000256.
