= Corumbela =

- Village
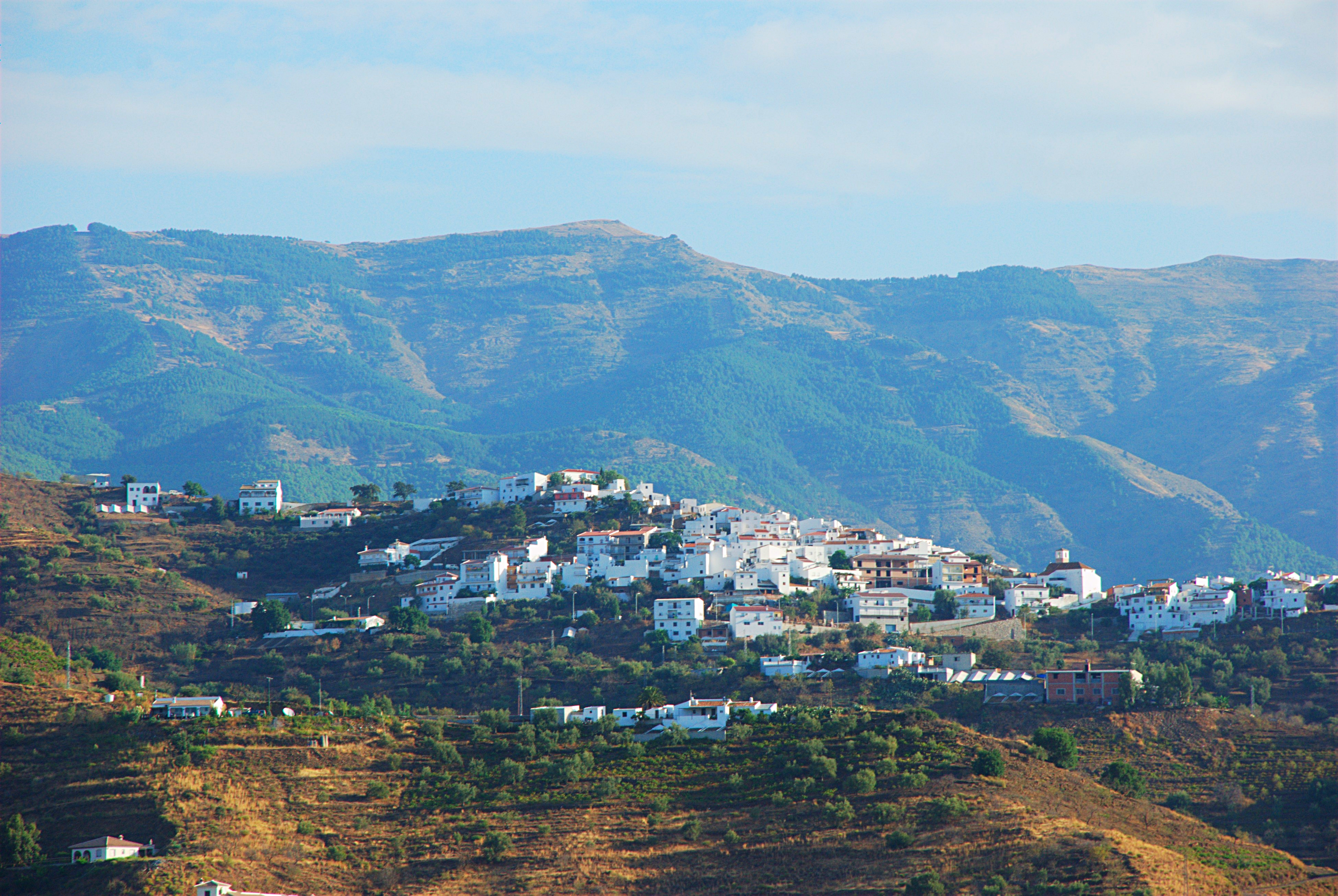
- View of Corumbela

- Location within Spain
- Coordinates: 36.821111°N 4.005278°W
- Country: Spain
- Autonomous community: Andalusia
- Province: Malaga
- Municipality: Sayalonga

Population (2012)
  - Total: 228
- Postal code: 29753

Corumbela is a village in the province of Málaga, Andalusia, Spain. The date of foundation is unknown, although it is believed that it was populated by Iberians. The name is Roman and means "dove".

At present, the village has about 300 inhabitants, because it never recovered from two natural disasters that occurred at the end of the 19th century: the phylloxera plague, a disease that affected the vineyards, and a strong earthquake, which badly affected the economy and made many people emigrate.

It is located at an altitude of 632 metres (2,073 ft), which results in great views in all directions, including views of the Mediterranean Sea. Corumbela has landscapes in which are full of enjoyable nature, since it is right beside the Sierras of Tejeda, Almijara and Alhama Natural Park.

== History ==
In 1493 the Catholic Monarchs Ferdinand II of Aragon and Isabella I of Castile, after completion of the conquest of the Emirate of Granada, gave Corumbela as payment for services to Diego Fernández de Córdoba y Mendoza, 3rd Count of Cabra. Afterwards it belonged to the Ducal House of Medinaceli, which owned the Estate until 1811 when the Cortes of Cádiz prohibited the lordships. From 1811 until 1868 it had its own council. In 1867 there was a regrouping into new municipal units in which Corumbela became part of the municipality of Sayalonga, where the Town Hall is located today.

== Monuments ==
The most important monument in Corumbela is without doubt its Church, which has a Mudéjar art minaret. The church has all the characteristics of once being a mosque, but the Minaret most faithfully preserves the Mudéjar architecture. It is built of masonry, with thick flat stones crossed by brick courses. Its interior is well preserved.

Another place to visit in Corumbela is "Las 3 Fuentes" (The 3 Springs), where natural and crystalline water runs. It is here where people gathered to collect drinking water. This is located on the outskirts of the town.

== Gastronomy ==
Corumbela has rich agriculture and gastronomy. Its cuisine is rich and varied. Some of the traditional dishes include fennel stew, blood sausages, and cateto bread, which made in a traditional wood oven.

== Festivals ==
- The Corumbela festival is held in honor of San Antón on the first weekend of July. For this, the village publishes an advertising book with the companies and businesses in the area, including the program for the 3 days, which is distributed by the town and the establishments weeks before the festival takes place.
- Holy Week in Corumbela has its main activity on three days: on Holy Thursday Our Lady of Sorrows and the Nazareno del Perdón leave in procession. On Good Friday, Our Lady of Sorrows and the Crucified Christ make their exit and finally on Easter Sunday the Risen Christ comes out accompanied again by Our Lady of Sorrows.

== Sources ==
- Ayuntamiento de Sayalonga Corumbela
- https://web.archive.org/web/20131104010911/http://www.pueblos-espana.org/andalucia/malaga/corumbela/
- https://web.archive.org/web/20091220080841/http://www.sayalonga.es/corumbela.htm
