= Battle of Moclín (1485) =

- Part of the Spanish Reconquista and Granada War
- Moclín Castle
Date	2 September 1485
Location	Moclín, Spain
Result	Granadan victory

Belligerents
Crown of Castile: Order of Calatrava	Emirate of Granada

Commanders and leaders
Diego Fernández de Córdoba (WIA); Martin Alfonso de Montemayor; Gonzalez Fernández de Córdoba †	Muhammad Al-Zagal

Strength
3,700 men	20,000 men

Casualties and losses
1,000 killed 100 captured	Unknown

The Battle of Moclín or Disaster of Moclín was a military engagement during the Granada War. Ferdinand II of Aragon dispatched a force under the Count of Cabra to capture the city of Moclin. The Granadan forces under Muhammad XII of Granada were victorious and repelled the Castilian attack.

== Background ==
In 1485, the Catholic Monarchs were preparing several campaigns against the Granadan towns. The Count of Cabra, Diego Fernández de Córdoba, reported to the Monarchs that the city of Moclín was defenseless and that it would be easy to capture. The king agreed to launch an expedition to capture it. The King entrusted the army to Diego and Martin Alfonso de Montemayor. The King believed that the capture of Moclín would lead to the surrender of Granada. The king dispatched a force of 700 cavalry and 3,000 infantry for the mission. Not all of the King's council approved the mission, but the King nevertheless ordered to do that.

== Battle ==
Diego quickly marched at midnight as he thought the Moors would be seized with terror and flee from Moclín by the cover of darkness. Arriving there on September 2, the Grananda king, Al-Zagal, learned of the upcoming attack and prepared a force of 20,000 cavalry and infantry to fend off the Castilians. Al-Zagal prepared an ambush, hiding the troops well. A force of Granandas attacked the Castilians and made a false retreat. The Castilians followed them but ended up being ambushed and surrounded. Many of the Castilians were killed, including Diego's brother, Gonzalez. Diego was wounded.

Diego ordered a retreat while the Granadans were slaughtering them from behind. The whole army could've been destroyed had not the intervention of the Grand Master of Calatrava covered the retreat and forced the Granadans to retreat to Moclín. The Castilians suffered more than 1,000 deaths and 100 prisoners. The Granadan king ordered the heads of the dead Castilians cut off and displayed in Granada so the people “would see what kind of king they had chosen.”

== Aftermath ==
The king received the news of the defeat, which distressed him. He reprimanded the count for thinking he could defeat a large number of Moors easily. The king abandoned the campaign of Moclín and instead he turned to Cambil and Alhabar, castles southeast of Jaén.

== Sources ==
- Nicolás Albornoz y Portocarrero (1909), Historia de la ciudad de Cabra.
- Alonso De Palencia (2011), Guerra de Granada.
- Joseph F. O'Callaghan (2014), The Last Crusade in the West, Castile and the Conquest of Granada.
