= Battle of Lucena =

1483 battle of the Granada War

- Part of Granada War
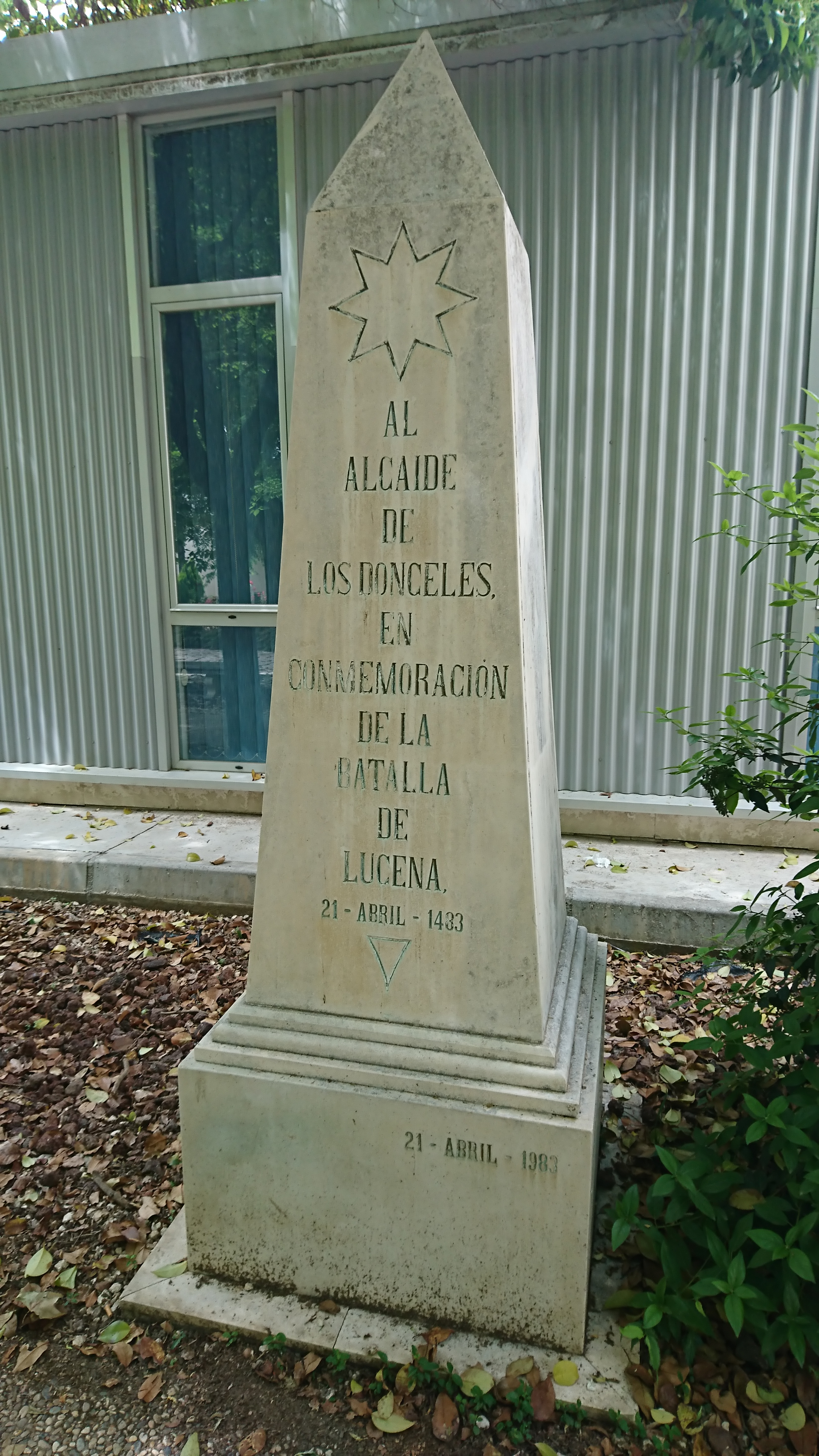
- A monument in Lucena commemorating the battle
Date	April, 1483
Location	Lucena, Spain 37°24′32″N 04°29′07″W
Result	Castilian victory

Belligerents
Emirate of Granada	Crown of Castile

Commanders and leaders
Muhammad XI of Granada (POW); Ibrahim Aliatar †	Diego Fernández de Córdoba y Carrillo de Albornoz; Diego Fernández de Córdoba y Arellano; Hernando de Argote

Strength
c. 5,000–6,000	c. 4,500–6,000

Casualties and losses
Very Heavy; Granadan army rendered ineffective	Minimal

The Battle of Lucena, also called Battle of Martín González, was a war event in which Christian forces of the Crown of Castile were faced against the Muslim forces of the Nasrid Emirate of Granada. It took place in the month of April of the year 1483, in the course of the Granada War, and in the course of it the Christian forces took Muhammad XI of Granada prisoner.

== Description ==
It was fought very close to the city of Lucena, in the province of Córdoba, Andalusia, Spain, south of the Sierra de Aras. The cause of the battle was the pretense of Muhammad XI of Granada (Boabdil) to take Lucena and perform a punishment raid against the Christians, to emulate the victory that his competitor, Muhammad XII had won in defeating Christian forces at Al-Sarquiyya (Córdoba). The Emirate of Granada was at that time experiencing a serious internal conflict between the supporters of the sultan Abu l-Hasan Ali and those who supported his son Muhammad XI of Granada (Boabdil).

Muhammad XI (Boabdil) besieged Lucena on April 20, 1483, with the help of his father-in-law Ibrahim Aliatar, mayor of Loja, an expert of the lands of southern Córdoba and a successful military of the Nasrids in terms of raids against Christians. The city of Lucena was defended by the "Alcaide de los Donceles" Diego Fernández de Córdoba y Arellano and the Alcaide of Lucena Hernando de Argote. The alcaide de los Donceles lit the merlons of the watchtowers to ask help from his uncle Diego Fernández de Córdoba y Carrillo de Albornoz, 2nd count of Cabra, who came with his army from nearby Cabra. Muhammad XI (Boabdil) arranged his army in the northwest direction to avoid being caught by surprise by the count's army. However, seeing that they were outnumbered, they withdrew to the outskirts of the city, where the battle as such began.

=== Capture of Muhammad XI (Boabdil) ===
In the course of the battle, the Muslim forces fled in disarray. Ibrahim Aliatar, Muhammad XI's father-in-law, died in battle and Muhammad XI tried to escape, but his horse got stuck in the mud and he had to hide in the vegetation. An infantry squad had him detained and the soldiers deduced that he was an important man because of his clothing, which it made possible for the Christians to capture Muhammad XI (Boabdil), who was taken prisoner to the Castle of Moral (in Lucena).

After such success, the nephew (the alcaide de los Donceles) and the uncle (the count of Cabra) began a dispute to see who would deliver the prisoner to the Catholic Monarchs. Such was the dispute that Ferdinand II of Aragon ordered both of them to take the sultan to Porcuna, where he was imprisoned again in the castle's tower, currently known as Torre de Boabdil.

The clothing, shoes and swords of Muhammad XI (Boabdil) were given by the Catholic Monarchs as a gift to the alcaide de los Donceles and the count of Cabra. The whole set is, currently, displayed at the Army Museum of Toledo.
