= Diego Fernández de Córdoba y Mendoza =

Castilian nobleman

Count of Cabra
- In office 1487–1525
- Preceded by: Diego Fernández de Córdoba y Carrillo de Albornoz
- Succeeded by: Luis Fernández de Córdoba y Zúñiga

Personal details
- Died: 11 August 1525 Baena, Córdoba
- Occupation: Nobleman

Diego Fernández de Córdoba y Mendoza (died 11 August 1525), 3rd Count of Cabra, was a Castilian nobleman. He served with distinction during the war in which the Emirate of Granada was conquered by the forces of Castile and Aragon, and subsequently had great influence in Castile.

== Family ==
Diego was son of Diego Fernández de Córdoba y Carrillo de Albornoz (c. 1438–1487), 2nd Count of Cabra, Viscount of Iznájar, lord of Baena and of many other manors. His father was one of the most prominent men of late medieval Castile, and under Henry IV of Castile (1425–1474) played a leading role in the conquest of the Nasrid Emirate of Granada. His mother was María Hurtado de Mendoza, daughter of Diego Hurtado de Mendoza, 1st Duke of the Infantado, and also of the highest Castilian nobility. Diego's childhood education was mainly concerned with the art of war, and he accompanied his father in the Granada War (1482–1491).

Diego's first wife was Beatriz Enriquez de Velasco, cousin of Ferdinand II of Aragon (1452–1516), daughter of Alonso Enríquez de Quiñones (c. 1432–1485), third Admiral of Castile, Count of Melgar y Rueda and uncle of King Ferdinand (Note: Juana Enriquez de Córdoba (1425–1468) was Ferdinand's mother.), and Maria de Velasco, daughter of Pedro Fernández de Velasco, 1st Count of Haro. His second wife was Francisca de Zúñiga and de la Cerda, daughter of Diego de Zúñiga, claimant to be Duke of Béjar, and Juana de la Cerda y Castañeda. He had many children, both legitimate and illegitimate.

== Military career ==
Diego succeeded his father in 1487, and began to distinguish himself in his own right in the sieges of Granada. In 1488 he was instructed by the Catholic monarchs, Ferdinand II of Aragon and Isabella I of Castile, to start an offensive against Grenada from Murcia, which he did with all the forces he could supply and won many victories, concluding with the capture of Baza and Huéscar. In 1489 he was told by the sovereigns to invade Grenada from Guadix in May. He provided 250 lances and 300 foot soldiers, and with his uncle Martín Alfonso de Córdoba y Montemayor made the whole of the Alpujarras region fall to the Christian forces the next year. The fighting continued, with another attack on the Nasrid emirate and the Vega de Granada, defense of Baza, and on 23 April 1491 a fresh attack on the Vega de Granada to end the armed conflict. Don Diego Fernández de Córdoba, count of Cabra, Viscount of Iznájar, lord of Baena is listed among those present in December 1491 in the Capitulations of Santa Fe. (Note: The Capitulations of Santa Fe was the agreement of 17 April 1492 between the Catholic monarchs and Christopher Columbus. Possibly the source means the Treaty of Granada (1491). The document recording this treaty is dated 30 December 1492, because at that time the new year was considered to start on 25 December, and confirms the capitulations that were granted in the Real de la Vega de Granada on 25 November 1491 between the Catholic sovereigns and the representatives on Boabdil, king of Granada.)

== Later career ==
After the war the Catholic monarchs rewarded Diego in 1493 with the lordship of the towns of Canillas de Aceituno, Árchez and Corumbela in the Sierra de Bentomiz and Vélez-Málaga area. He now had great influence in Castile. On 11 June 1499 he was appointed joint viceroy and governor of Castile with Gómez Suárez de Figueroa, Count of Feria and father of his relative the Marquis of Priego to represent them during his visit to Andalusia. Diego was one of the three ambassadors to England that left on 26 August 1501 to accompany princess Catherine of Aragon (1485–1536) on her marriage to Arthur, Prince of Wales (1486–1502). The others were Alonso de Fonseca (1440–1512), archbishop of Santiago de Compostela, and his cousin Antonio de Rojas Manrique (died 1527), bishop of Mallorca.

In November 1506 some nobles, including Diego Fernández de Córdoba y Mendoza and Pedro Fernández de Córdoba y Pacheco (1470–1517), Marquis of Priego, instigated a riot in Córdoba in which the Inquisition's prison was assaulted and the prisoners released. The inquisitor Diego Rodríguez de Lucero fled on a mule to save his life. Diego was appointed Alcalde mayor (Chief justice) and Alcaide (Governor) of the fortress of Alcalá la Real. In the last part of his life Diego Fernández de Córdoba seems to have carried out important pacification work in Córdoba, which earned him the gratitude of the Emperor Charles V (1500–1558). Diego Fernández de Córdoba and Mendoza died in Baena, Córdoba on 11 August 1525.

== Sources ==
- Molina Recio, Raúl (2018), Diego Fernández de Córdoba y Mendoza (in Spanish), Real Academia de la Historia
- Recio Mateo, Luis, "El inquisidor Rodríguez de Lucero", cordobainterculturalidad.com (in Spanish)
- Redondo, Antonio (2018), Breve Historia de la Villa de Almadrones (in Spanish)
