= Sayalonga =

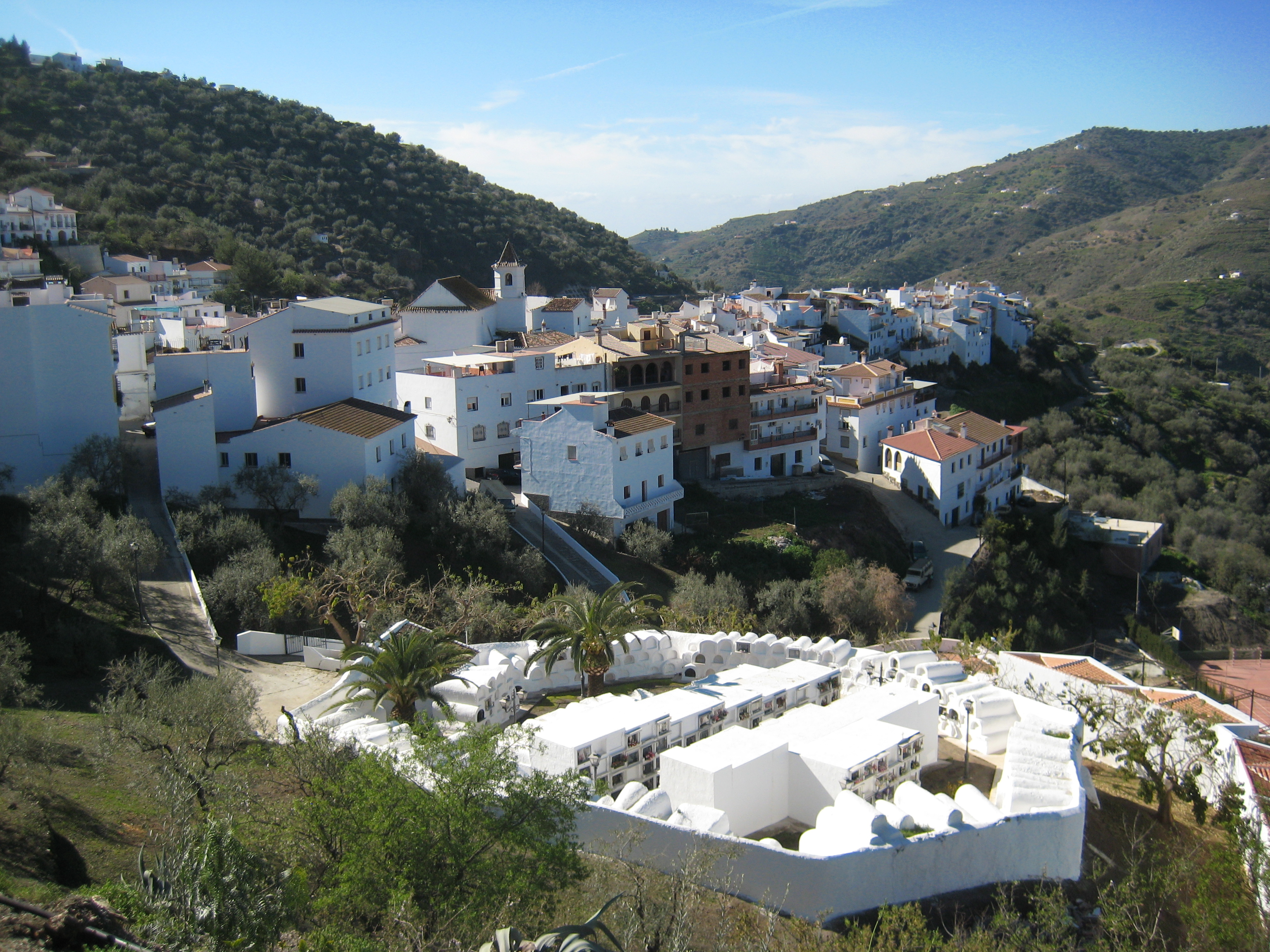

- Flag Coat of arms

- Location in Spain.
- Coordinates: 36°48′N 4°01′W
- Sovereign state: Spain
- Autonomous community: Andalusia
- Province: Málaga

Area
  - Total: 18.3 km^{2} (7.1 sq mi)
- Elevation: 359 m (1,178 ft)

Population (2025-01-01)
  - Total: 1,672
  - Density: 91.4/km^{2} (237/sq mi)
- Time zone: UTC+1 (CET)
  - Summer (DST): UTC+2 (CEST)
- Website: www.sayalonga.es

Sayalonga is a town and municipality in the province of Málaga, part of the autonomous community of Andalusia in southern Spain. It belongs to the comarca of La Axarquía. The municipality is situated approximately 38 kilometres from the capital of Málaga and 12 kilometres from Vélez Málaga. It has a population of approximately 1,300 residents. The natives are called Sayalonguinos.

In 1867 there was a regrouping into new municipal units in which the village of Corumbela became part of the municipality of Sayalonga.

== Twin towns ==
- Piaggine (Italy)

== See also ==
- List of municipalities in Málaga
