= Diego Fernández de Córdoba y Carrillo de Albornoz =

Castilian nobleman

Diego Fernández de Córdoba y Carrillo de Albornoz (c. 1438 – Baena, 5 October 1487) was a Castilian nobleman who held the titles of 2nd Count of Cabra, 2nd Viscount of Iznájar, 4th Lord of Baena and Marshal of Castile. He is best known for leading the Castilians during the Battle of Lucena (1483), in which the last emir of Granada Boabdil was taken prisoner.

== Biography ==
He was the eldest surviving son of Diego Fernández de Córdoba y Montemayor and María Carrillo y Venegas.
As a young man, he participated in the attacks on the Nasrid Kingdom of Granada during the first years of the reign of Henry IV of Castile. In 1455, he participated in the conquest of the Vega de Granada, an act for which he received the title of Marshal of Castile. This title was until then held by his father, who in exchange was granted the title of 1st Count of Cabra. Likewise, a few years later Henry IV granted him the town of Alcalá la Real. He continued to participate in Granada campaigns with his father, distinguishing himself in the campaigns against Archidona and Alhama de Granada.

During the War of the Castilian Succession between Henry IV of Castile and his half-brother Alfonso, Prince of Asturias, he fought against the rebellious nobles who proclaimed the Infante Alfonso king of Castile during the Farce of Ávila. Fulfilling his loyalty to the King, he reconquered the town of Écija in 1466, receiving Bujalance as a reward, although he never occupied it because his relative Alfonso de Aguilar prevented him from doing so. The enmity between the two became such that he was imprisoned by Alfonso in the castle of Cañete de las Torres. The reprisals were not long in coming and, once released, Diego attacked the town of Santaella, where many of Alfonso's relatives lived. He kidnapped some of them, such as the young Gonzalo Fernández de Córdoba and imprisoned them in the castle of Cabra until the intervention of Queen Isabella I of Castile.

=== Capture of Boabdil ===
Diego participated in the Battle of Lucena that took place in 1483, where he helped his nephew Diego Fernández de Córdoba y Arellano, 1st Marquis of Comares to defeat the Granadan army, and where Boabdil, Nasrid Emir of Granada, was taken prisoner. In gratitude for the services rendered, the Catholic Monarchs gave him the sword of Boabdil, which is currently on display in the Army Museum in Toledo.

After his death in 1487 in Baena, according to his will, he was buried in the Convento de Santa Marta in Córdoba. He was succeeded by Diego Fernández de Córdoba y Mendoza, the eldest of the eight children he had with his wife María Hurtado de Mendoza, daughter of Diego Hurtado de Mendoza, 1st Duke of the Infantado.
