= Lucena, Córdoba =

Lucena
- Municipality
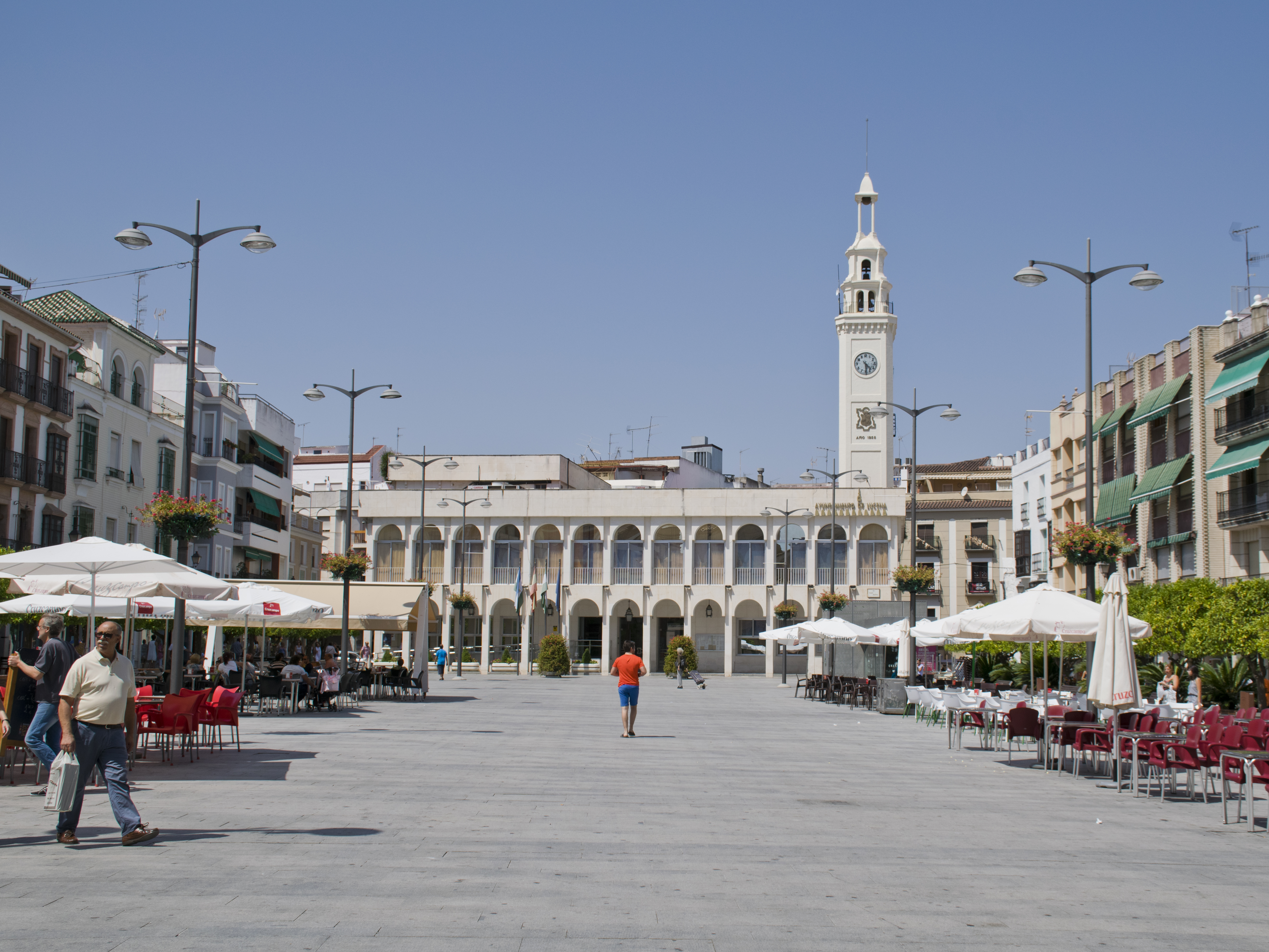

- Flag Seal
- Interactive map of Lucena
- Location within Spain Location within Andalusia Location within Province of Córdoba (Spain)
- Coordinates: 37°24′32″N 04°29′07″W
- Country: Spain
- Autonomous community: Andalusia
- Province: Córdoba

Government
  - Mayor: Juan Pérez Guerrero

Area
  - Total: 351 km^{2} (136 sq mi)
- Elevation: 485 m (1,591 ft)

Population (2025-01-01)
  - Total: 43,408
  - Density: 124/km^{2} (320/sq mi)
- Demonym: Lucentinos
- Postal code: 14900

Lucena (Spanish pronunciation: [luˈθena]) is a municipality of Spain belonging to the province of Córdoba, in the autonomous community of Andalusia. It is the second-most populated municipality in the province.

A major Jewish centre from the 9th to the 12th centuries, Lucena was remarked for having a Jewish-majority population.

== Geography ==
Lucena is located in the transition zone between the campiña in the Guadalquivir Depression and the Subbaetic system, at an altitude above mean sea level slightly below 500 meters. The Subbaetic system includes neighboring subranges such as the sierras of Cabra, Carcabuey, Pollos, Horconera, and Rute.

== History ==
Despite claims of association with earlier locations (such as ancient Erisana), Lucena did not enter historical record until the period of Islamic rule. It was first mentioned in an 853 responsum which described Lucena (Alisana), then part of the Emirate of Córdoba, as "a city of many Jews" with "no Gentile in its midst". The city then belonged to the Kūra (district) of Cabra. The Jewish scholars of Lucena maintained correspondence with the geonim of the Sura Academy in Babylonia. Some gravestones unearthed in the Jewish necropolis of Lucena have been tentatively dated to the 9th–10th centuries. Already in the 10th century, Lucena's Jewry competed in importance with Córdoba's. Amid the fitna of al-Andalus that brought the collapse of the Caliphate of Córdoba in the 11th century, Lucena became part of the Zirid Kingdom of Granada.

At the beginning of the 11th century, several important Jewish scholars lived in Lucena. Isaac Alfasi founded a large Talmudic academy in Lucena, and here also Isaac ibn Ghayyat, Isaac ibn Albalia, and Joseph ibn Migash were prominent.

Jews in Lucena drastically decreased in number upon the onset of Almoravid and Almohad rule, with Jews fleeing to locations of the Iberian Peninsula's Christian North (such as Toledo), being forcefully converted to Islam or being deported as captives to North Africa. The Talmudic academy was relocated to Toledo by ibn Migash's sons. The Almohad conquest of Lucena took place in 1148. Jewish commentator Abraham ibn Ezra lamented the fall of Lucena to the Almohads as if it were a sort of a minor Jerusalem. Whatever the case, Lucena effectively ceased to exist then as a Jewish centre.

Lucena was conquered by the Crown of Castile in 1240. It was thereby donated to the Bishop and the Cabildo of the Cathedral of Córdoba in 1241. Lucena remained under Cordobese bishopric control until 1342, when it became a stately possession under Leonor de Guzmán. It was thus granted a fuero similar to Córdoba's in 1344. A borderland town with the Nasrid Kingdom of Granada for the rest of the middle ages, it became a possession of a branch of the House of Fernández de Córdoba in the late 14th century. In 1483, when Muhammad XI of Granada invaded Castile, he was taken prisoner at Lucena.

Population boomed in the early 16th century, growing from 1,300 inhabitants in 1495 to about 8,172 in 1530, owing to the disappearance of the frontier condition in the wake of the Conquest of Granada in 1492. Lucena was then settled by numerous converso families, contributing to the demographic growth. Conversos leaned on serving the ruling aristocracy, the Marquises of Comares. Lucena was granted the title of ciudad ('city') in 1618.

Portuguese immigrants with a converso background such as the Rodríguez settled in Lucena in the early modern period linking with the local Carmona-Castillo converso lineage. Similarly to the situation in other towns of the Kingdom of Córdoba, the Portuguese were involved in sectors of the local economy such as the textile industry and slave trade.

The chief industries are the manufacture of furniture, industrial refrigerators, wine, bronze lamps and pottery, especially the large earthenware jars (tinajas) used in the past throughout Spain for the storage of oil and wine, some of which held more than 300 gallons. Matches also used to be made there. There is considerable trade in agricultural produce. The horse fair in September was famous throughout Andalusia, but since the last decades of the 20th century there is only a fair like in most towns in Andalusia.

== Easter celebrations - Semana Santa ==
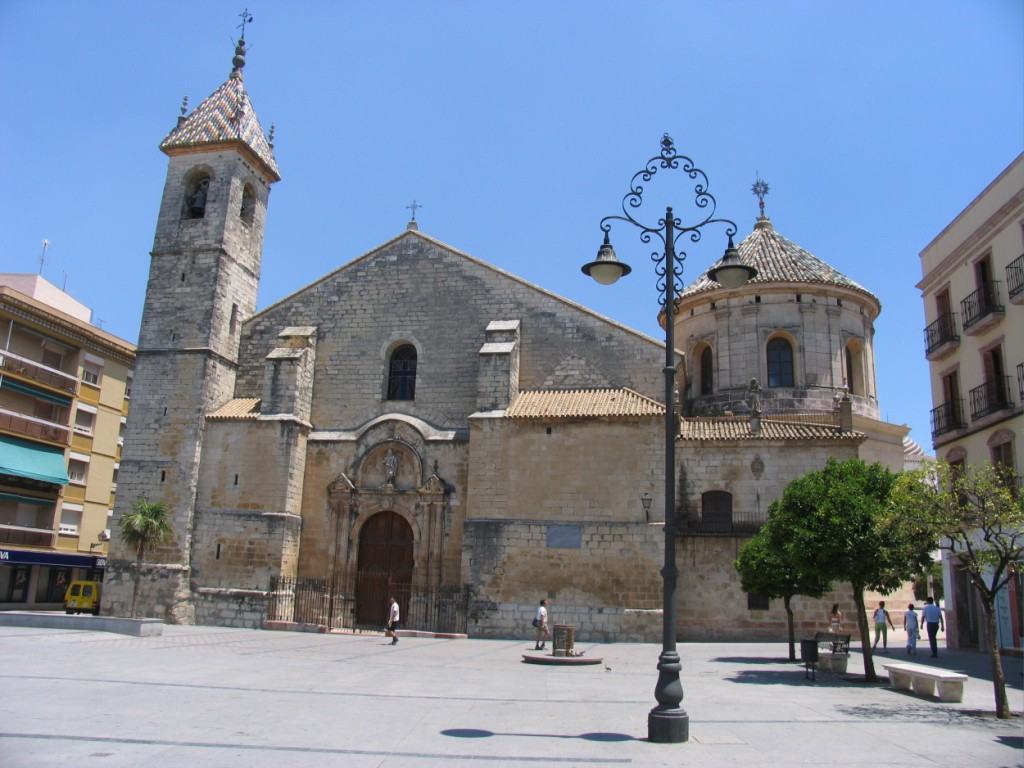
Church of St. Matthew

Easter, or Semana Santa, is a large celebration taking place yearly in Lucena, like in most parts of Spain. However, Lucena's Semana Santa, declared of Special Tourist Interest, is well known for its peculiar and unique way of porting or carrying the "pasos" or processions. All these "pasos" are formed by at least one sculpture, most of the time hundreds of years old. They are carried on shoulders as nowhere else in Andalusia, all porters uncovered (unlike the Seville way) and at the same level (unlike the Málaga way). The way processions are carried in Lucena is called "santería", and it is a particular trait to the city. Santería can best be appreciated on Easter Thursday (Jueves Santo) where 9 "pasos" take the streets. The most culturally important are the Cristo de la Columna, by renowned sculptor Pedro Roldán, created in 1675, and the Cristo de la Sangre, brought from the Spanish Americas in the beginning of the 17th century.

The most eventful Semana Santa days in Lucena are Palm Sunday (5), Tuesday (7), Thursday (9) and Saturday (1).

Palm Sunday sees 5 "pasos" on the streets belonging to 3 different congregations and churches. They come together at a certain point creating a single procession. Palm Sunday highlights the Cristo de la Bondad and the Oración en el Huerto and the Madonna de la Estrella.

Monday is all consecrated to only one congregation (cofradía), that of the Franciscan brothers. The "pasos" have their quarters at a Franciscan convent in downtown Lucena. Highlights this day are the "trono" (platform in which the sculptures are carried) of the venerated Medinaceli Christ, and the Virgen de Piedra.

Tuesday sees 3 different congregations and 7 different "pasos" on the streets of Lucena. First one, the Carmine congregation, founded in 1606 with 3 very old and historical "pasos" leaving from the Carmen church in Southern Lucena. The most culturally important are the "Virgen de los Dolores", of the old school of Granada sculptures, as well as the "Señor de la Humildad". This congregation is one of the oldest in the city and have kept the same traditions as they were centuries ago.

The two other congregations have their site in the very central St. Matthew's Cathedral, in Plaza Nueva. The Servitas congregation, founded in 1724, and the "Peace & Love" congregation, starring the "Madonna of Peace & Love" as well as the "Christ of Peace & Love".

Wednesday consists of only one congregation, that of "El Valle", and 2 "pasos" only on the streets. But this refers only until midnight arrives and "Jueves Santo" begins, the most complete and traditional day in Lucena.

Thursday at midnight, the "Cristo del Silencio" departs St. Matthew's Cathedral with the lights shut down. This procession connects Andalusian Holy Week traditions with those of Castilian background, presenting similarities to a Castilian procession in Lucena. In the early afternoon, a second congregation begins its procession from the "Dios Padre" chapel in eastern Lucena. Three "pasos" make up this congregation, including the "Holy Faith Allegory" and "Jesus washing St. Peter's feet."

After this, the next "paso" starts its procession the "Cristo de la Columna", by Pedro Roldán, comes out of St. Jacques church always punctual. The way this "paso" comes out is centred around the way it is carried, and all the "saetas" (flamenco-kind prayers that are sung as a virgin or christ is being processioned in Andalusia). Then, the "Cristo de la Sangre", one of the most traditional and historical "paso" there is in Lucena; Coming out of the St. Francis church in downtown Lucena. In total, there are 9 "pasos" on Thursday in Lucena. They all come together in Alcaide street Las Torres (downtown) where they head for Plaza Nueva (Main Square) before taking El Peso street, where they finally separate.

Thursday and Good Friday traditionally come together. There are just a few hours without "pasos" on the street since those of Thursday come back to church at 2:30 am and the next one, Nazareno Christ comes out at 6:00 am. Nazareno congregation is composed of 6 "pasos". The Nazareno itself is a very old and very much venerated sculpture of Renaissance style. The congregation was founded in 1599, one of the oldest in town. It has also kept its features of the past.

Saturday, there is only one congregation and one paso with it. The "Soledad". This congregation is the oldest one in Lucena, formed in 1564.

Sunday, as usual, the "Resurrection" congregation puts an end to a whole week of celebrations.

== See also ==
- Battle of Lucena
- List of municipalities in Córdoba

== Notable people ==
- Isaac ibn Ghiyyat (1038–1089)
- Joseph ibn Migash (Seville, 1077-1141), was a rabbi, posek and a rosh yeshiva who lived in Lucena most of his lifetime.
- Luis Ramírez de Lucena (1465-1530), a leading Spanish chess player, who wrote the oldest existing printed book on chess. The Lucena position is named after him.
- Luis Barahona de Soto (1548-1595), poet, a friend of Miguel de Cervantes.
- Antonio Mohedano (1561-1625, Antequera), painter of the Renaissance period.
- Francisco Hurtado Izquierdo (1699-1725, Priego de Córdoba), architect, author of the tabernacle in the Granada Charterhouse.
- José María Hinojosa, "El Tempranillo" (1805-1833), bandolero.
- Paco de Lucena (1859-1898), flamenco guitarist
- Victor Perez (Director) (born 1981), Spanish director, producer and digital film compositor
