= Paco de Lucena =

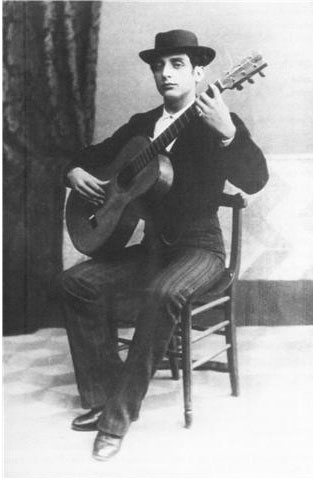
Paco de Lucena

Paco de Lucena, born Francisco Díaz Fernández (1859 – 1898 in Lucena) was a Spanish guitarist, and one of the most influential flamenco players of the late nineteenth century.

He influenced a number of classical and flamenco guitarists, who emerged early in the twentieth century as interest in the guitar revived.

Paco de Lucena died when Andrés Segovia was five. When Segovia began playing, a year later, his first guitar was one played by Lucena.

On 27–31 May 2009, the 150th anniversary of Lucena's birth was celebrated with a flamenco concert in Lucena Castle.
