= Jewish cemetery, Lucena =

Jewish cemetery in Spain

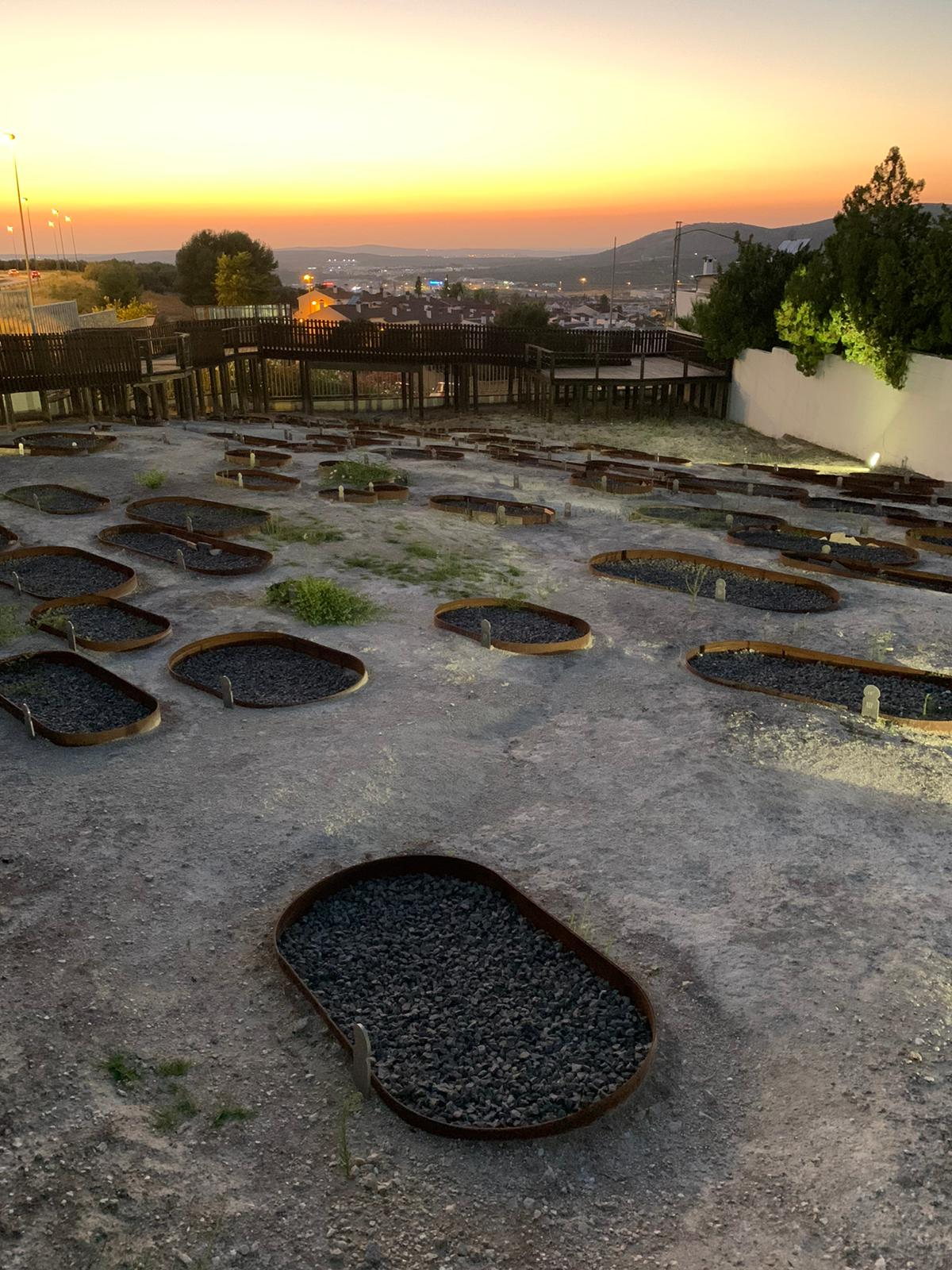
- Interactive map of Jewish cemetery, Lucena

Details
- Location: Lucena, Córdoba
- Country: Spain
- Coordinates: 37.4028799°N 4.48837734°W
- Type: Jewish
- No. of graves: 346

The Jewish necropolis of Lucena is a Jewish cemetery in Lucena, Spain. It was excavated in 2006 and has gravestones that date to as early as the 8th century CE. With 346 catalogued graves, it is the largest Jewish cemetery ever discovered in Spain.

== History ==
The Jewish community in Lucena was one of the most prosperous in the Iberian Peninsula until the rise of the Almoravid dynasty at the beginning of the 12th century. The city was destroyed in 1146.

The cemetery, a necropolis of at least 346 catalogued graves, was discovered in 2006, during construction of the southern ring road in Lucena. It is the largest Jewish cemetery excavated in Spain. One of the oldest gravestones with Hebrew letters at the site is dated to as early as the 8th century CE. Other remains discovered during the cemetery's excavation were dated to the period between 1000 and 1050 CE.

In 2011, scientists with the University of Granada studied teeth from remains at the graves to better understand the city's Jewish heritage. While the researchers received permission from the government of Lucena to examine the teeth, they did not secure permission from the Federation of Jewish Communities of Spain, the country's umbrella Jewish group.

During restoration work, more than 170 gravesites were exhumed. In December 2011, Chief Rabbi of Madrid Moshe Bendahan led a ceremony at the cemetery to rebury the bodies in line with Jewish burial standards.

The city of Lucena spent approximately $160,000 to rededicate the cemetery in 2013 and conducted a rededication ceremony on September 29, 2013, the European Day of Jewish Culture.
