= Convento de Santa Marta =

Convent in Córdoba, Spain

Coordinates: 37.8865°N 4.7749°W

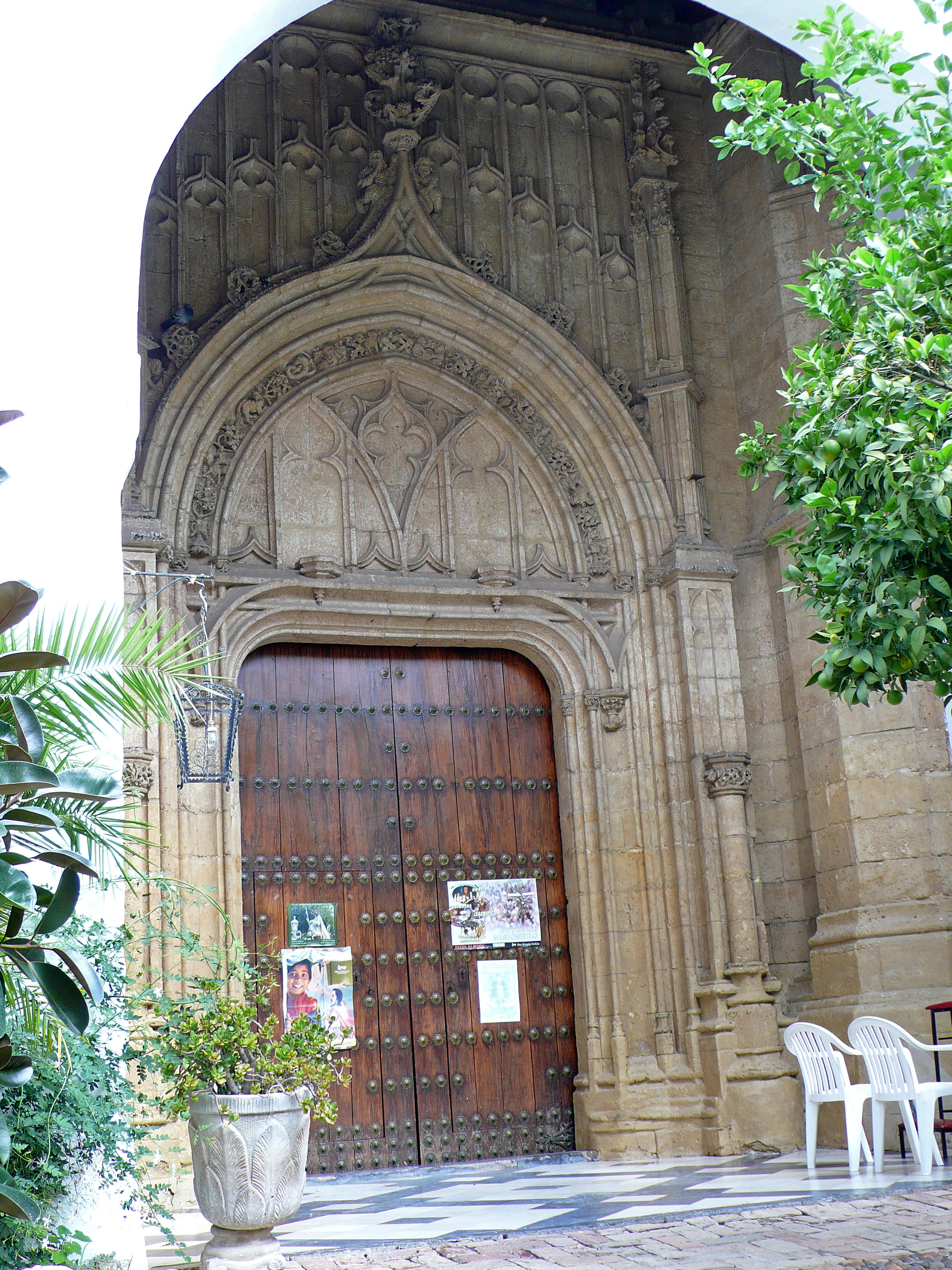
Convento de Santa Marta

The Convento de Santa Marta is a convent in Córdoba, Spain, on Calle de Santa Marta. Founded in 1464, it belongs to the female branch of the order Hieronymites.

Architecturally, the convent was built in the "Reyes Católicos" style and is characterized by its quadrangular nave covered by cross vaults, which highlight the altarpiece, made in the year 1582. The arch gives access to the cloister from the gallery and the Marian images both date to the 15th century. The convent has a late-16th-century altarpiece by the sculptor Andres Ocampo and the painter Baltasar del Águila. The roof of the church is made up of vaults and the entire complex is enclosed within a short wall.

== Burials ==
- Diego Fernández de Córdoba y Montemayor, 1st Count of Cabra (1410-1481),
- Diego Fernández de Córdoba y Carrillo de Albornoz, 2nd Count of Cabra (1438-1487).

== Gallery ==
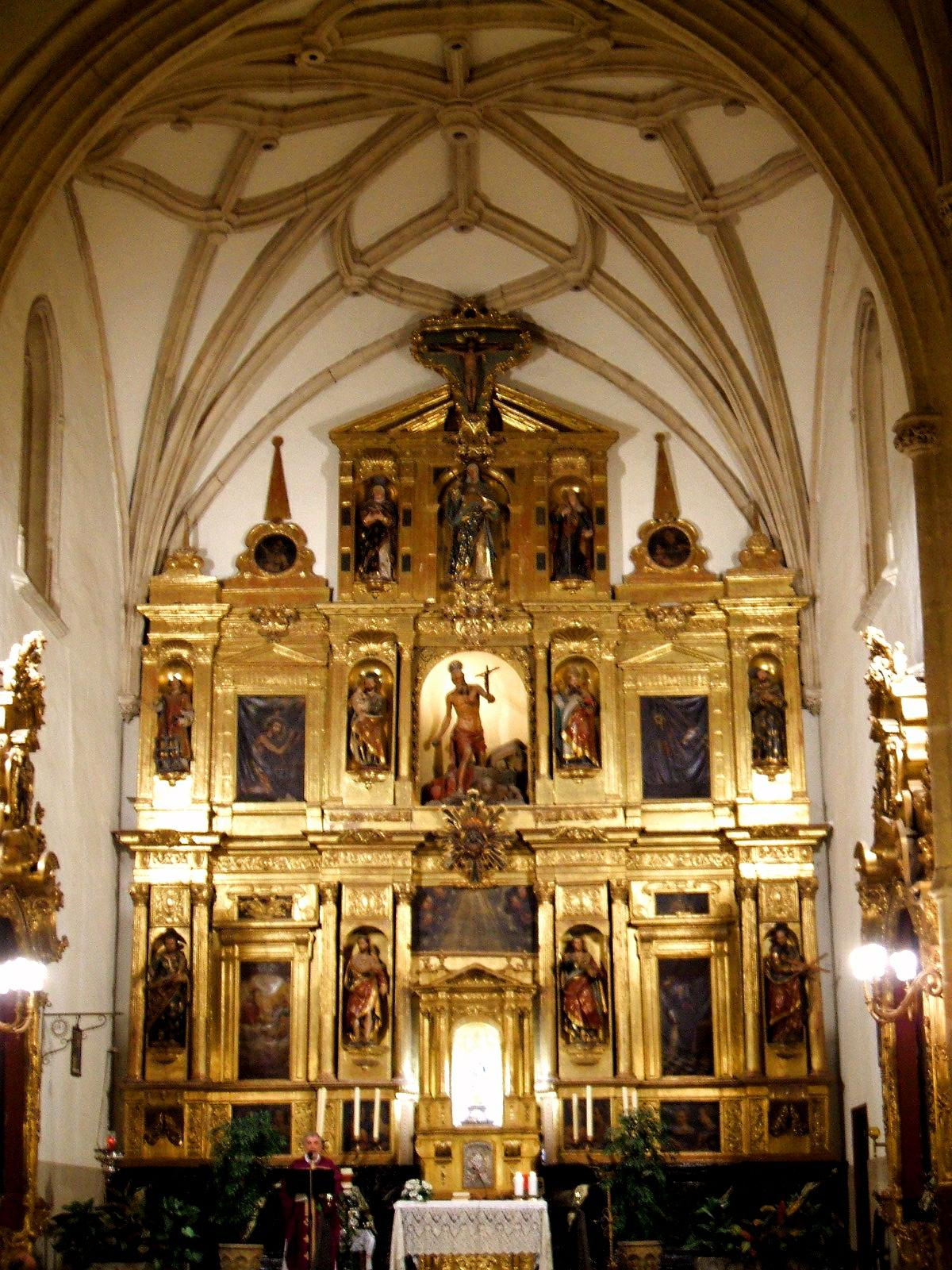
Altar

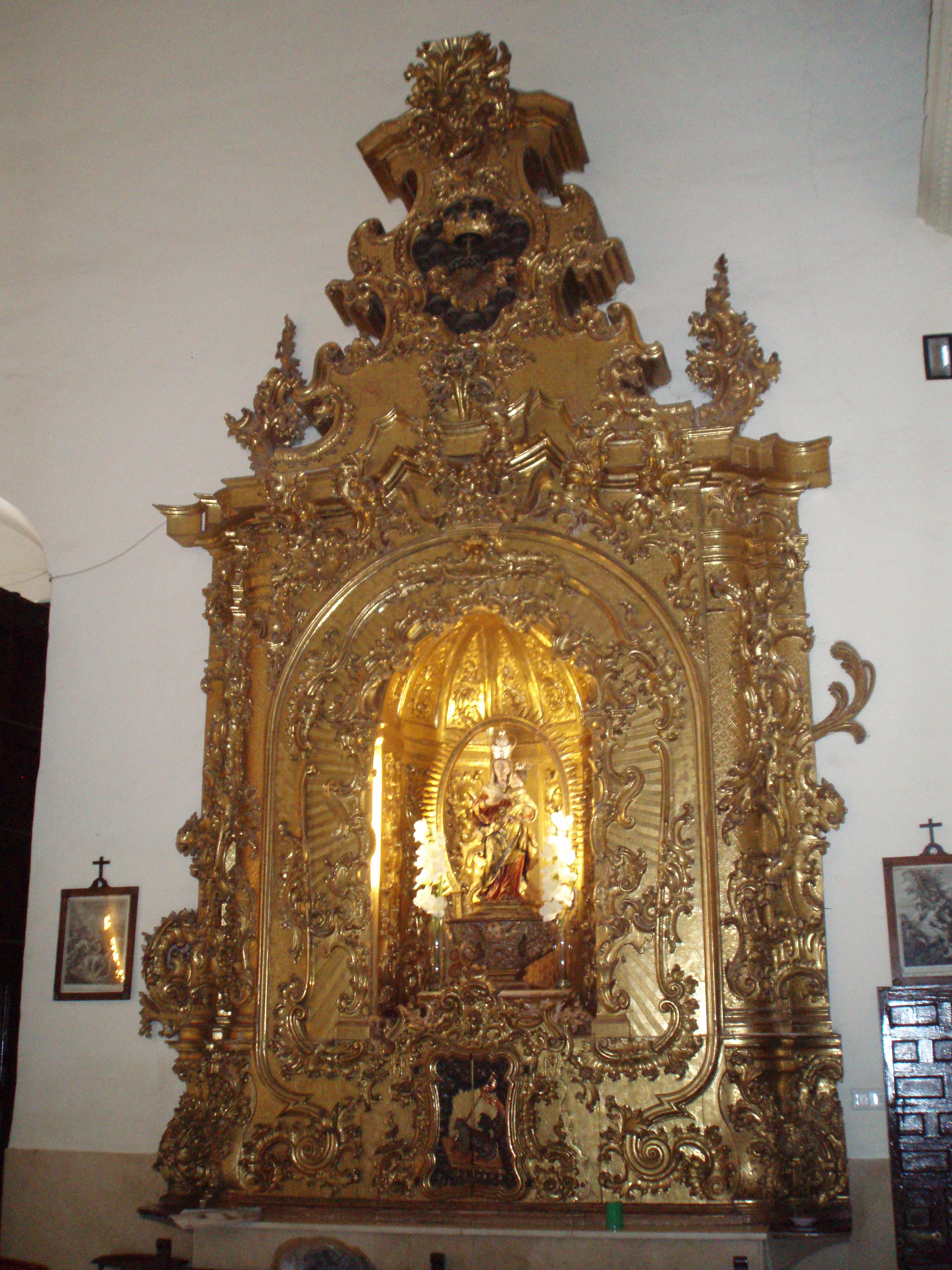
Altarpiece of the Virgin of the Valley

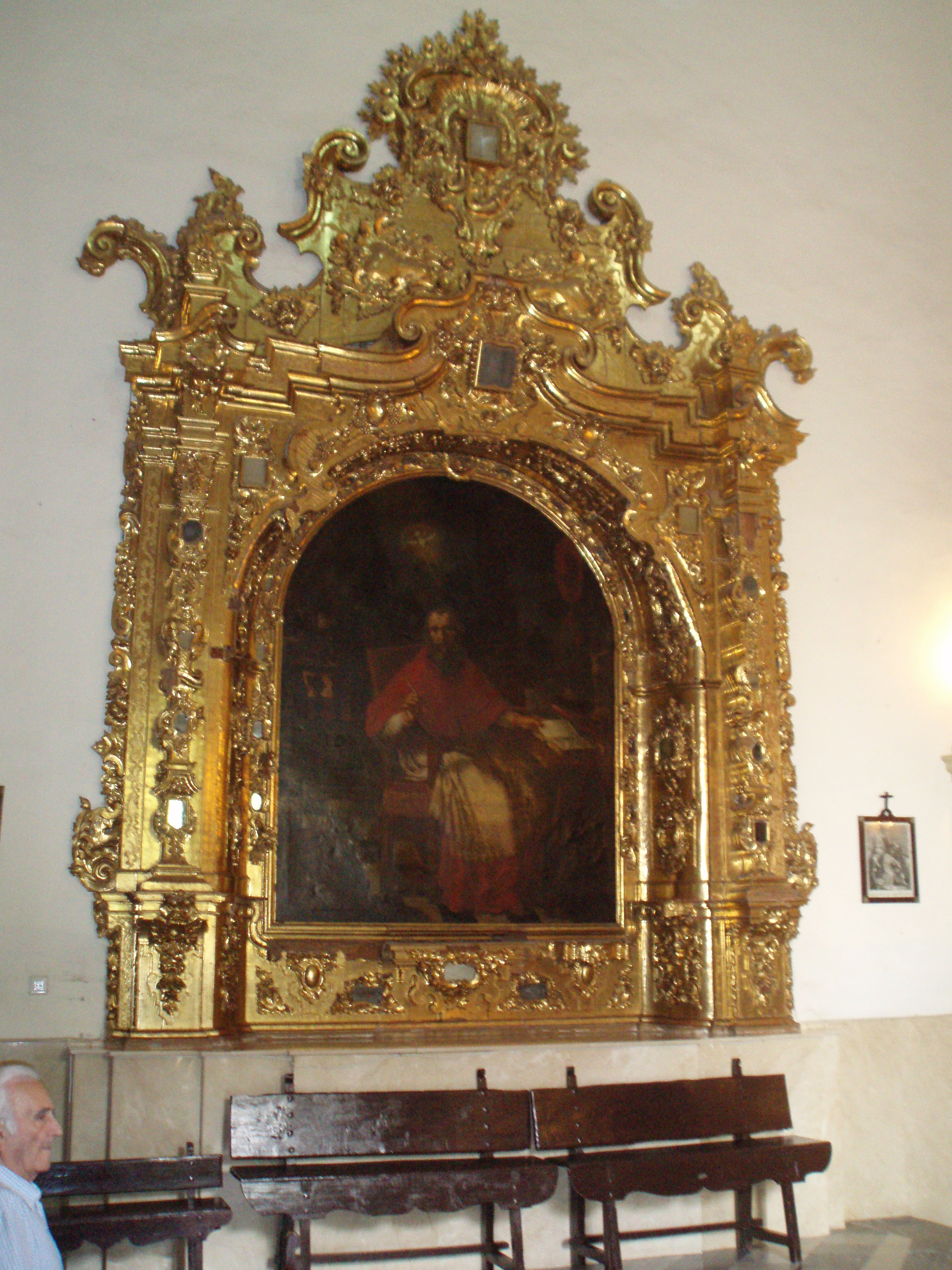
Altarpiece of San Jerónimo
