= Museum of the Army (Toledo) =

Military museum in Toledo, Spain

Coordinates: 39.8587°N 4.0205°W

- Museo del Ejército

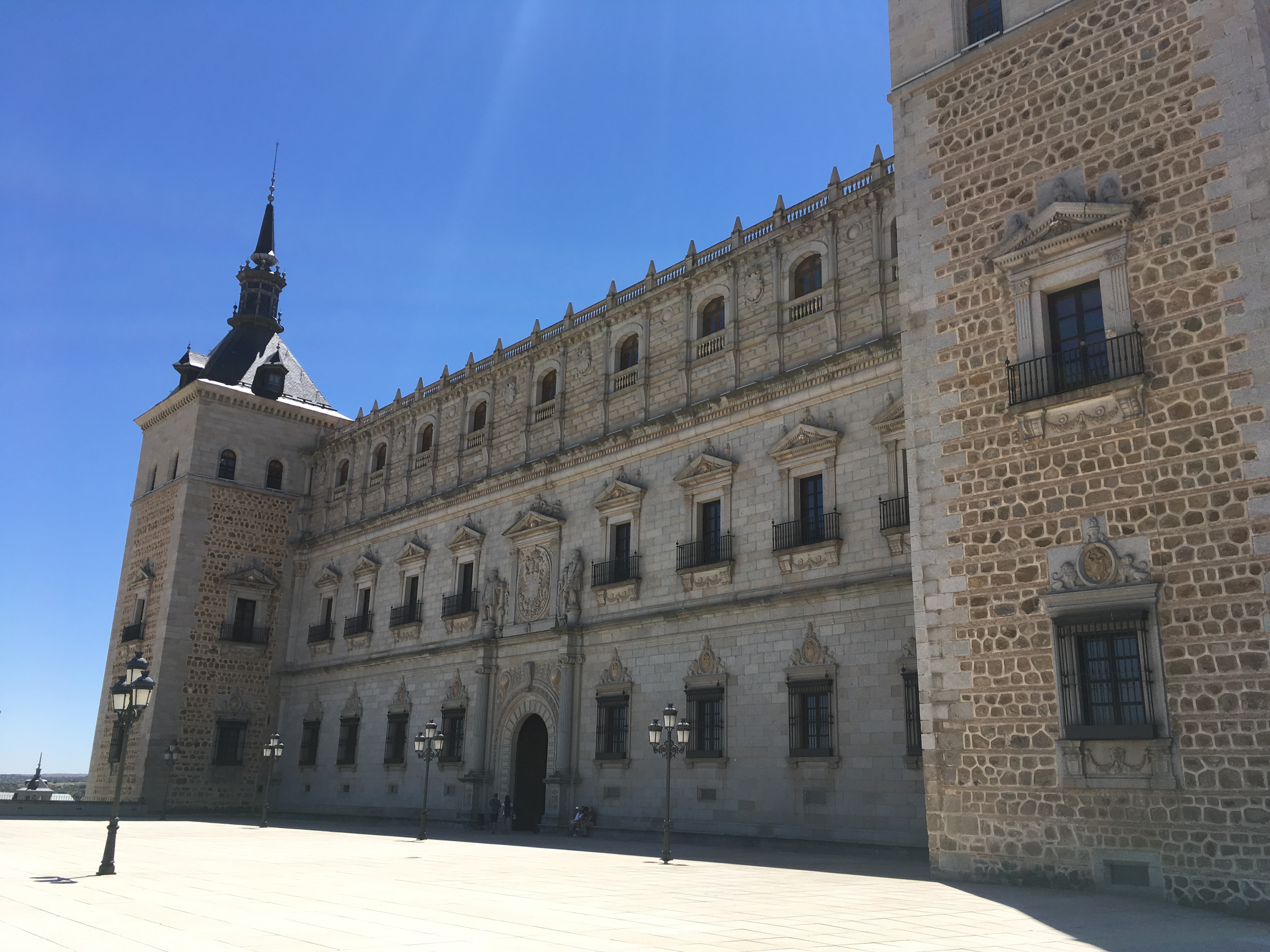
- Established: 2010 on present site
- Location: Toledo, Spain
- Owner: General State Administration
- Public transit access: Toledo railway station

The Museum of the Army (Spanish: Museo del Ejército) is a military museum in Toledo, Spain, devoted to the history of the Spanish Army. It is one of the National Museums of Spain and it is attached to the Ministry of Defence.

The collection was previously housed in Madrid, and the museum opened on its present site in 2010. It occupies two linked buildings, Toledo's historic Alcázar (castle) and a purpose-built extension.

== History ==
The history of the museum began in 1803 when the royal military museum was established in a building in Madrid known as the Palacio de Monteleón. The building also served as a barracks for artillery units and it was attacked and looted by the French when they suppressed the Dos de Mayo Uprising of 1808. The museum was reestablished, but in 1827 it was divided into two sections: the Museo de Artillería and the Museo de Ingenieros. Later the collections were unified and housed in the Hall of Realms.

In the twenty-first century the collections were moved from Madrid to Toledo. The new premises offered much more space, although the site was not without controversy because of its associations with the Siege of the Alcázar, an episode in the Spanish Civil War, when the castle was held by Nationalist forces. In the aftermath of the war, the ruins of the building became a propagandistic memorial to the Francoist victory. Yet still, the choice of content and the museographic treatment proved to be even more controversial.

The new museum was opened in 2010 by Felipe, Prince of Asturias.

== The Alcázar ==
The Alcázar is used for the Permanent Exhibition. Some rooms are devoted to chronological displays reflecting the history of Spain twinned with that of its Army, other rooms show the collections thematically.

== The new building ==
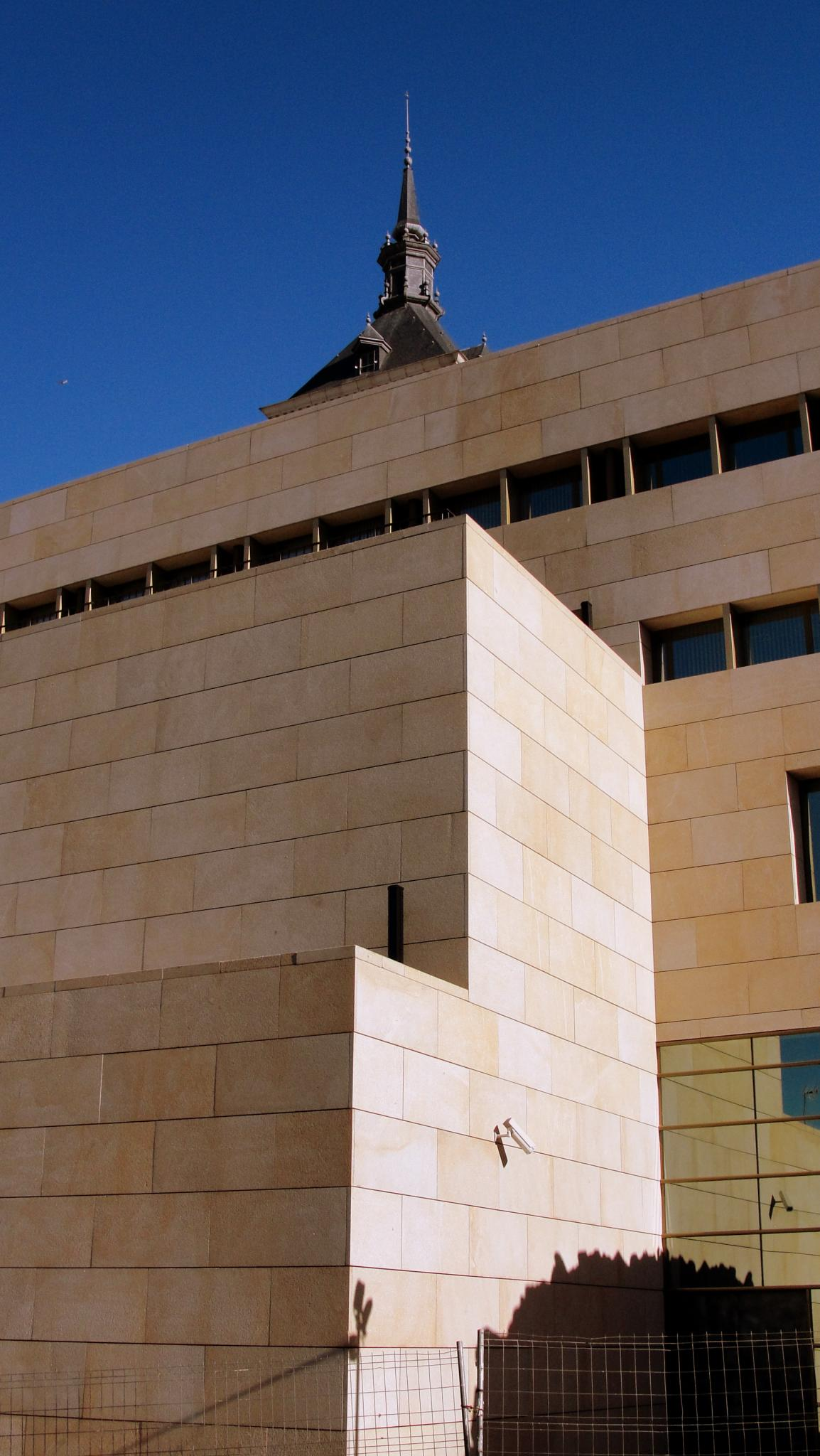
New annex building

The new building houses the administrative offices, the Temporary Exhibitions room, the Army room in the present time, the didactic classroom, the auditorium, the archive, the library, the coffee shop, the restoration workshops and the warehouses, all of them endowed with technical advances for the conservation, restoration, cataloging, investigation and diffusion of the funds that are guarded.

== Archaeology ==
Some items are archaeological. The displays include finds from excavations at the Alcázar which were undertaken prior to construction of the museum extension.

== Display cases and individual items ==
Some of the display cases belonging to the museum are of interest in their own right with decorative details reflecting their contents.

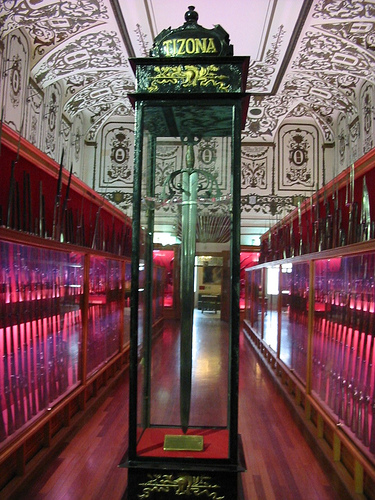
Sword on display at the Madrid site

The museum contains many miniature replicas of battles.

The displays on the 20th century include a 1930s Enigma machine in its original box. The Spanish have preserved a number of Enigma machines, modified versions of the commercial machine, which were obtained by Franco from Nazi Germany. In 1937, the British cryptographer Dilly Knox broke Franco's Enigma, but knowledge of this breakthrough was not shared with the Republicans. Two of the Spanish Enigma machines have been presented to British institutions in return for Enigma-related material.

== Gallery ==
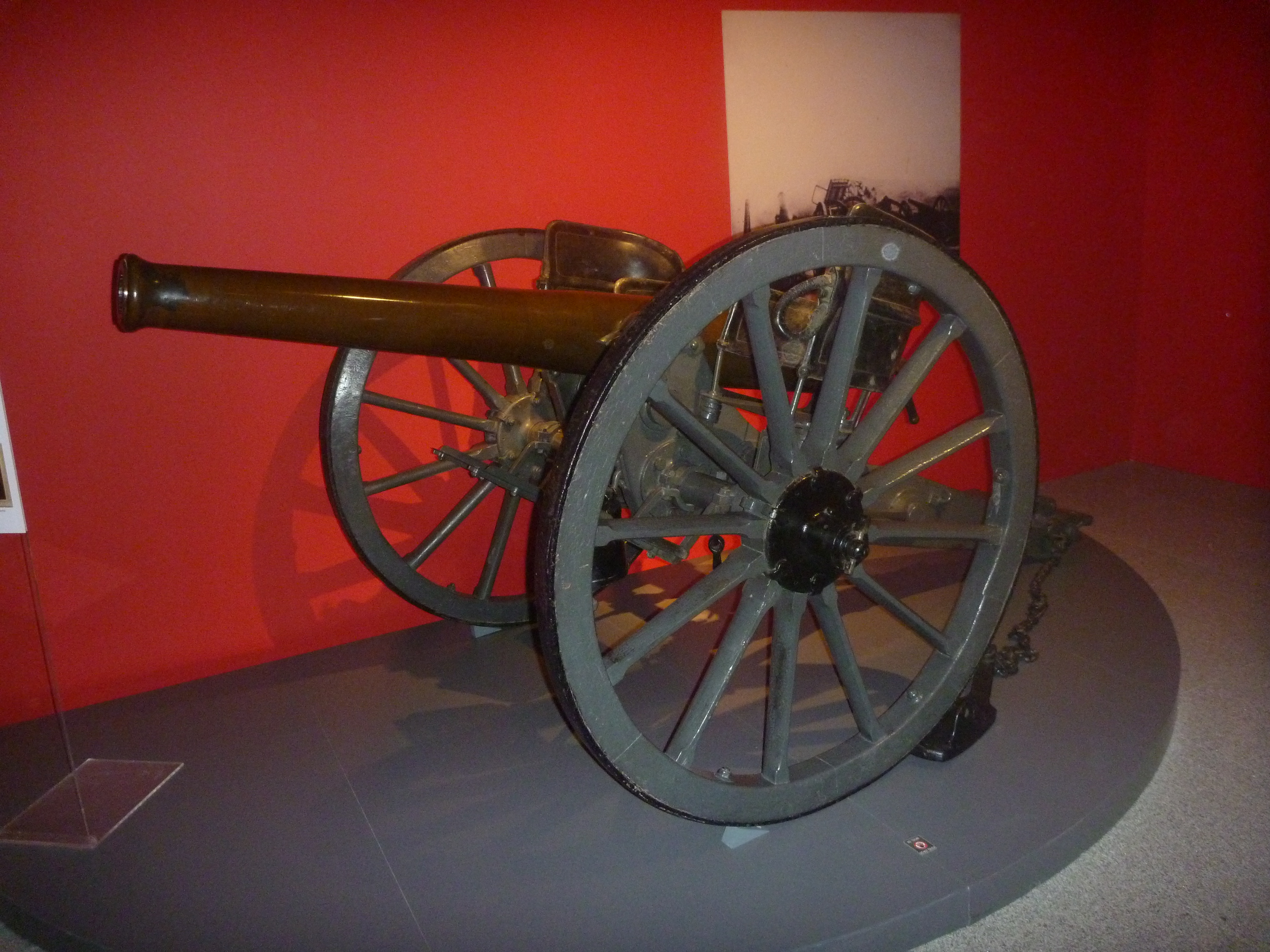
Bronze cannon Plasencia of 9 cm Model 1878 Krupp. Manufactured in the Royal Artillery Factory of Seville

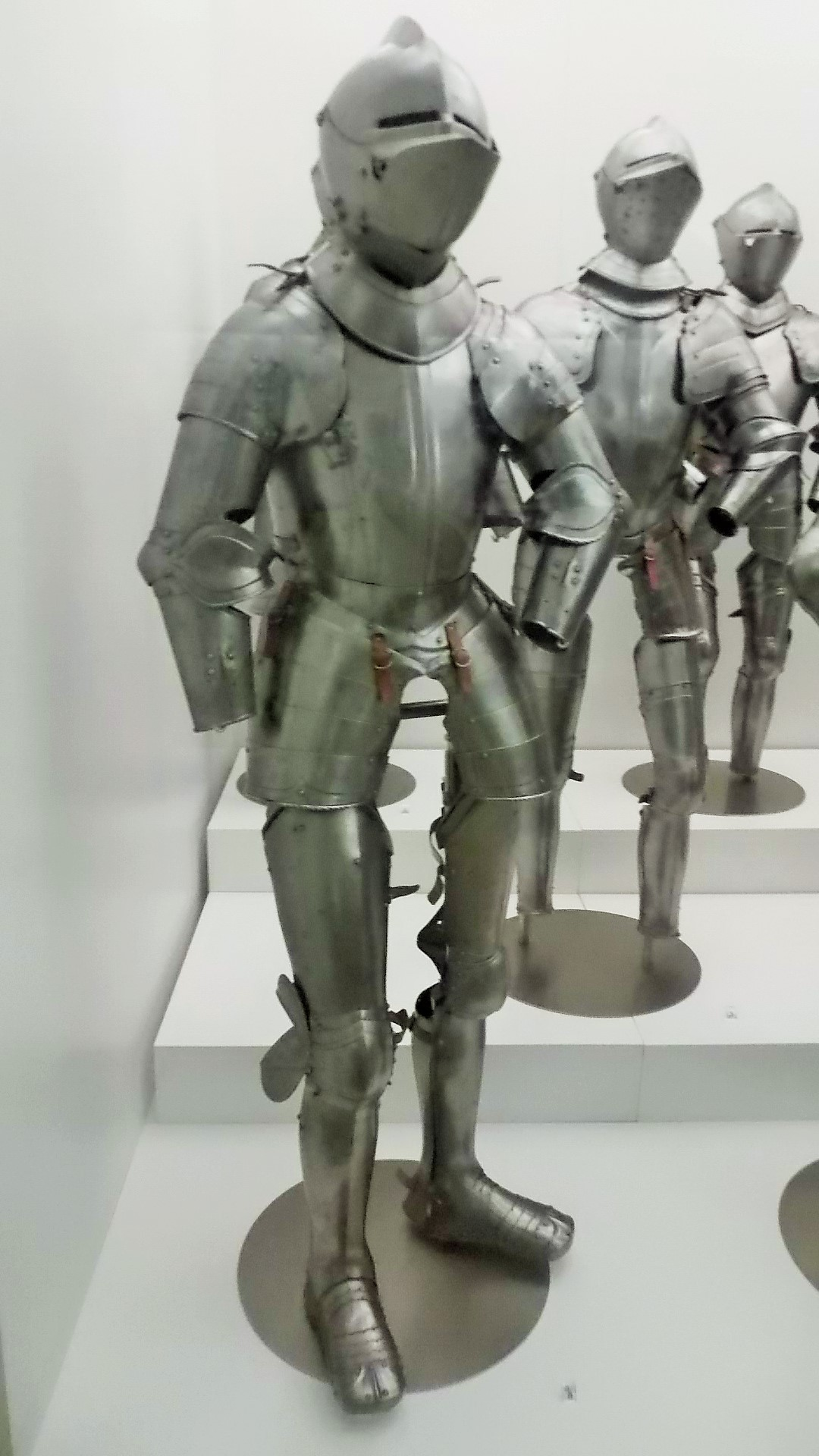
16th-century armours, Medinaceli Collection

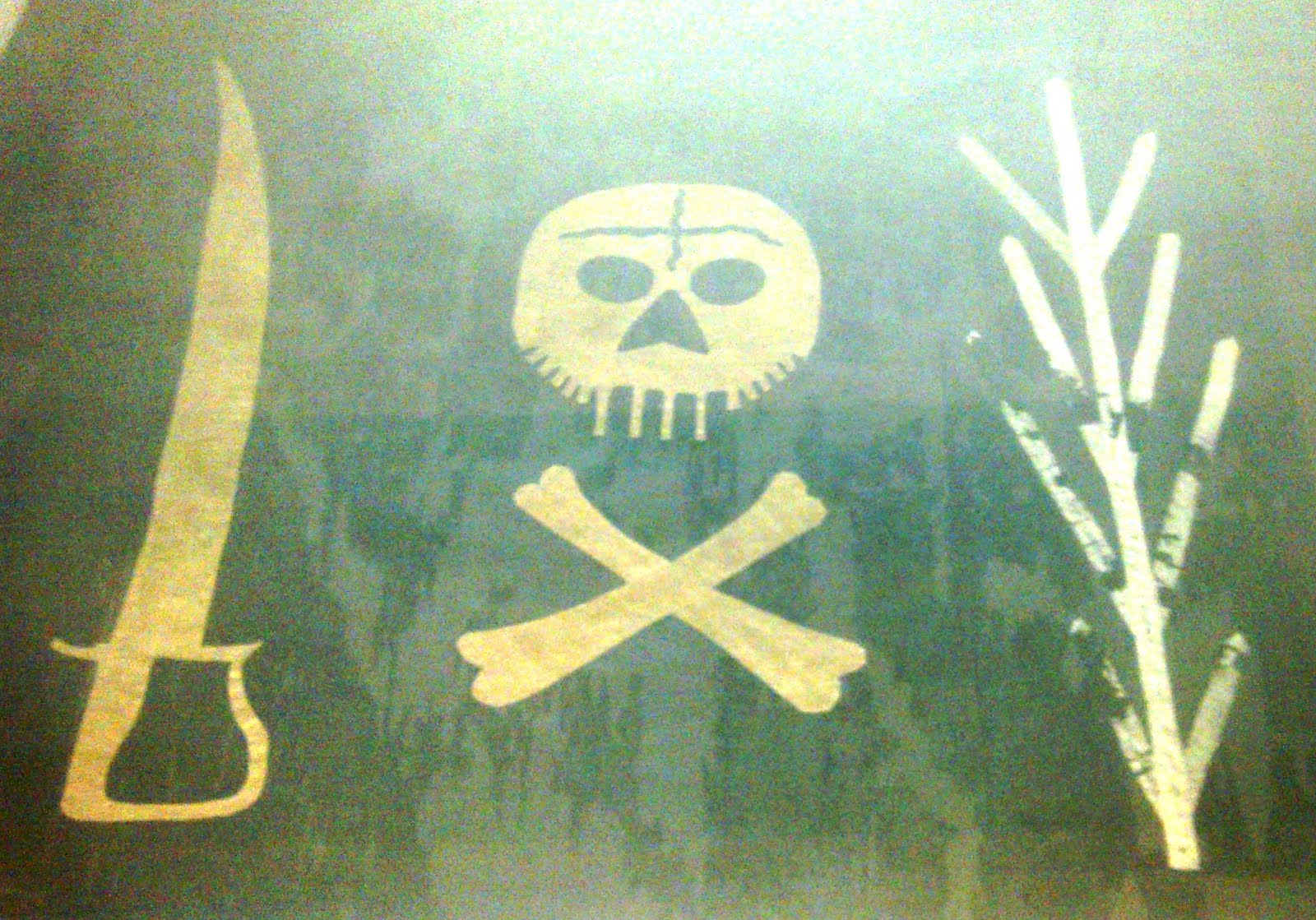
Flag of Ramón Cabrera

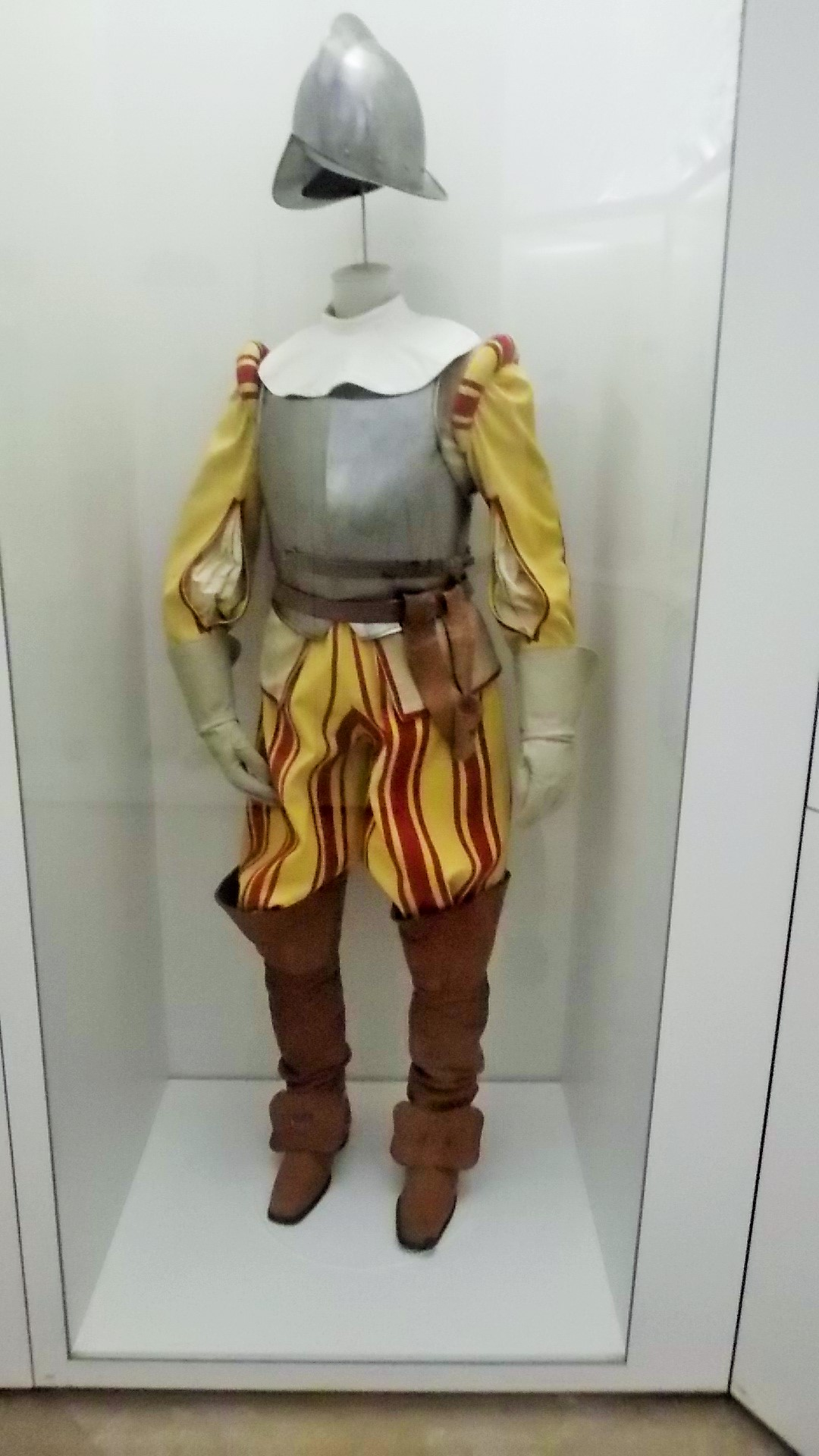
Costume of a cavalryman of the Trozo de Milan

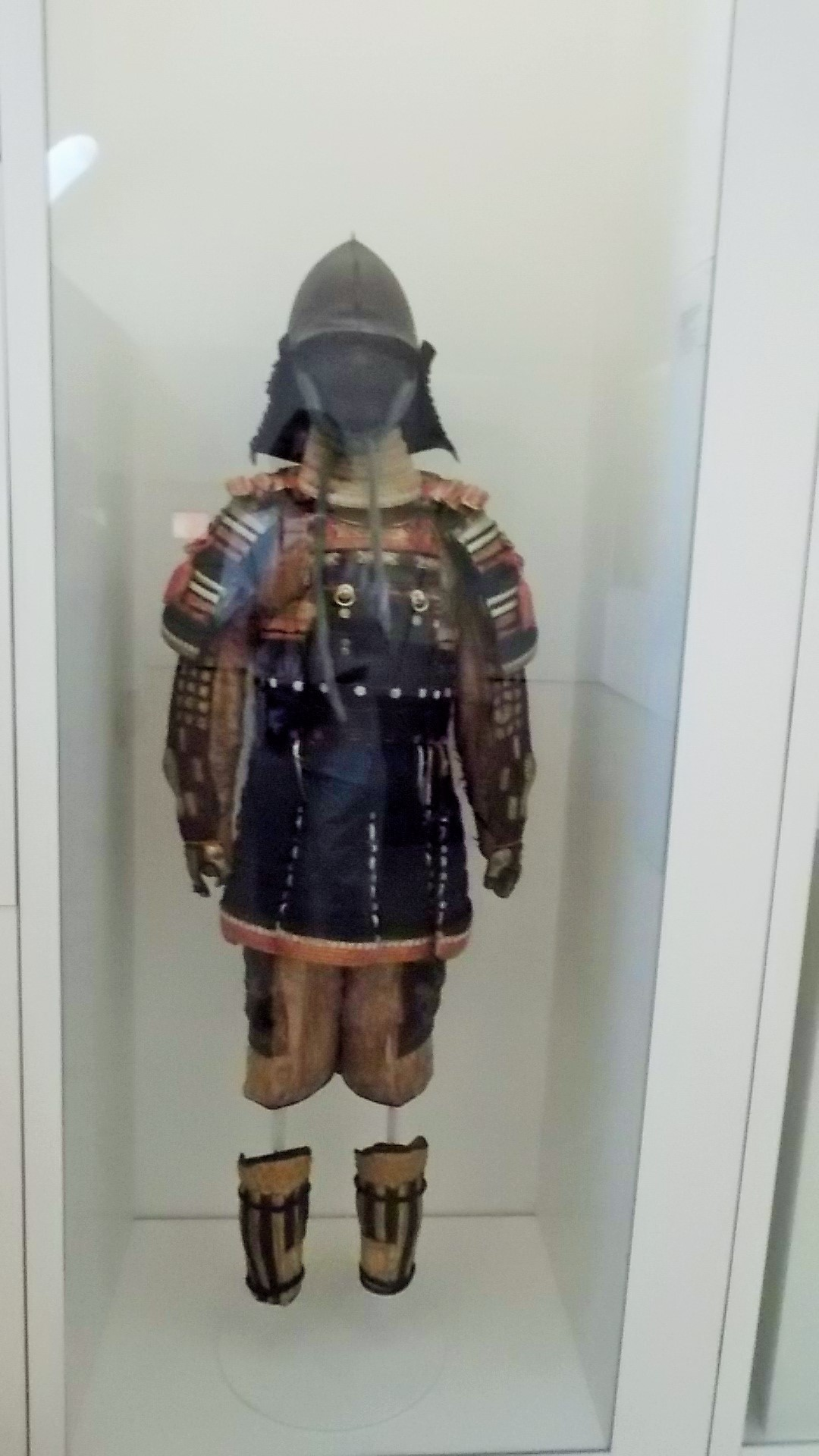
Japanese armor, end-Edo period (1603–1868)

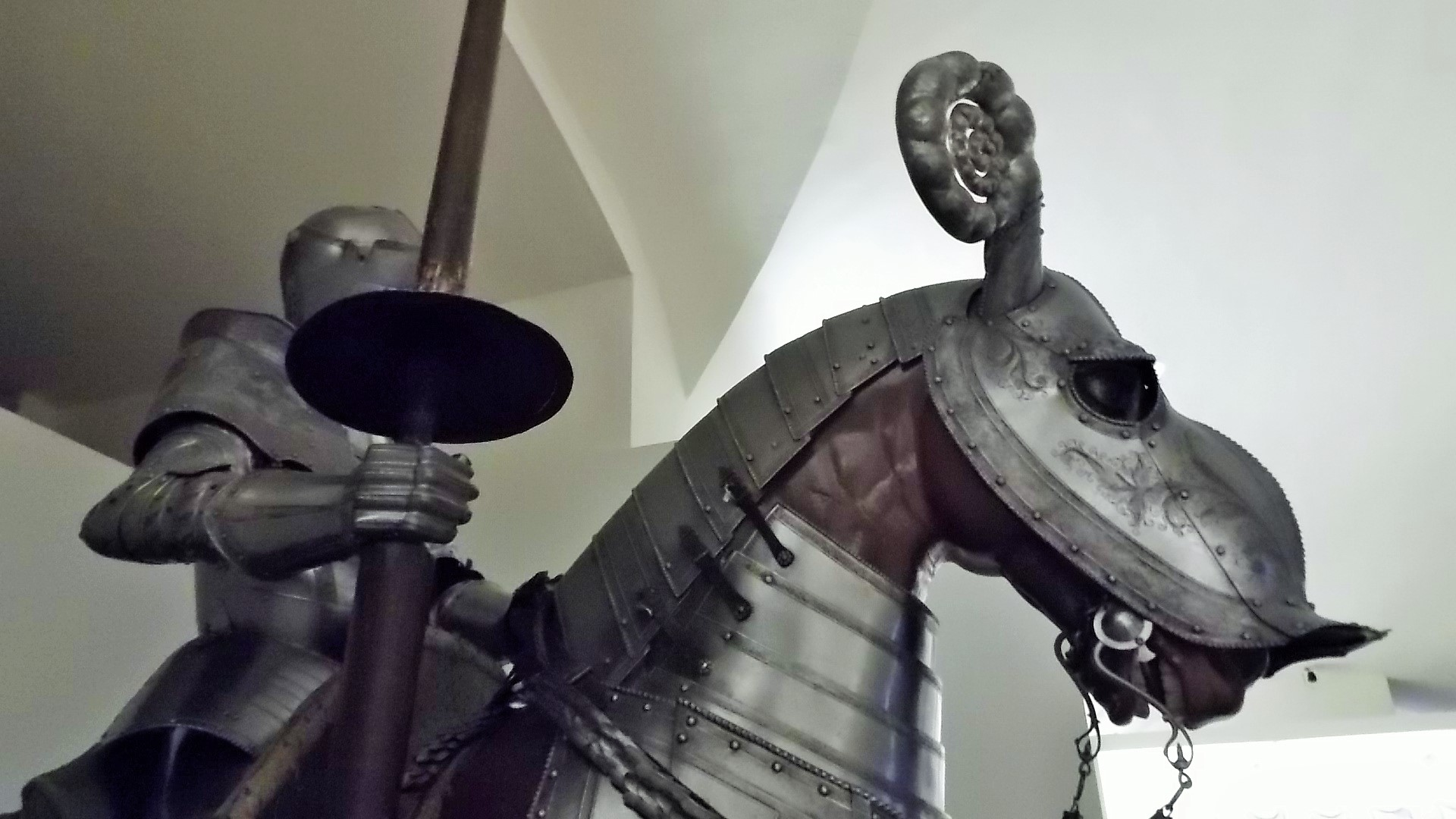
Armor of the Duke of Alcalá

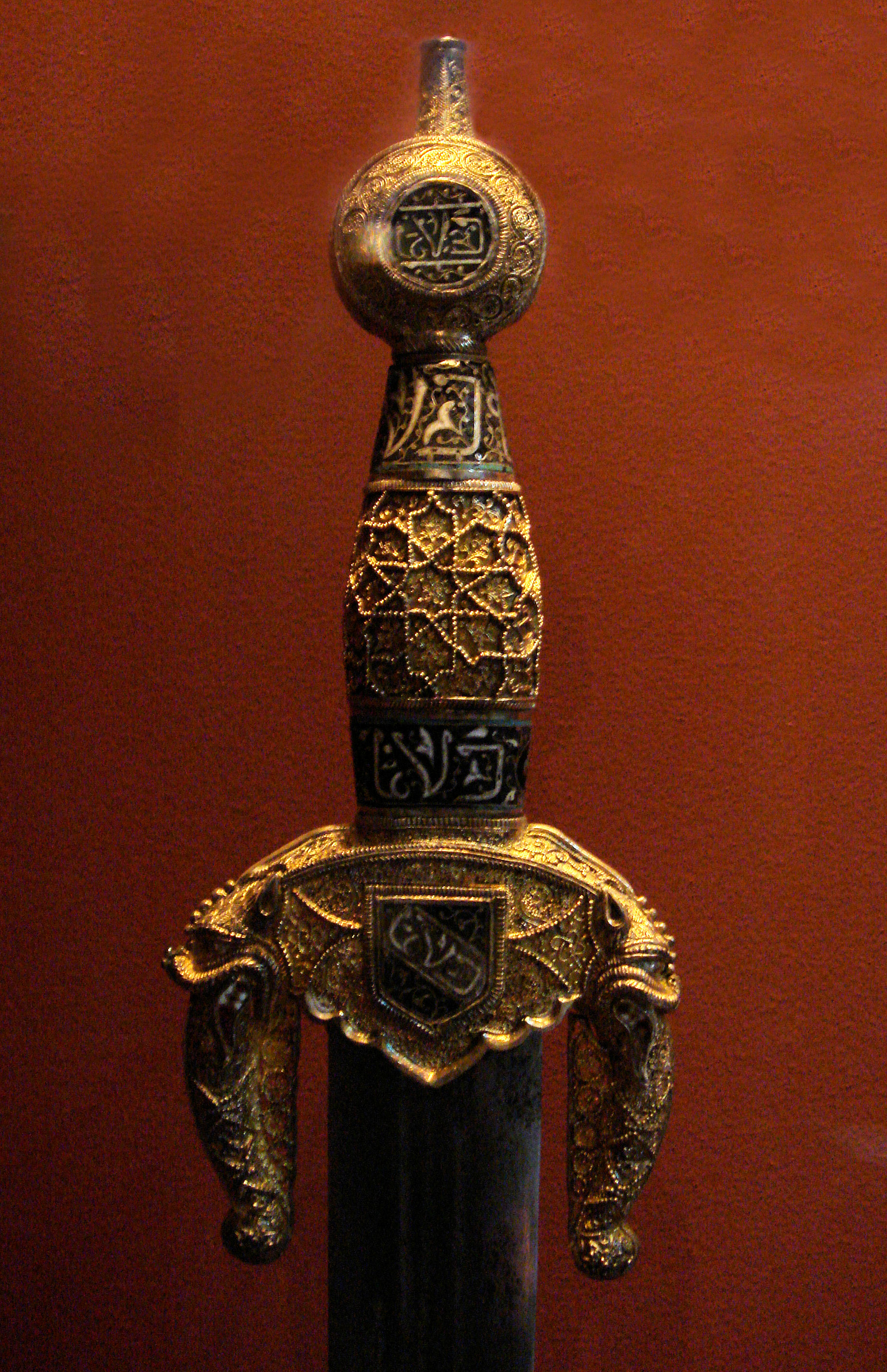
The personal sword, sultan clothing and shoes worn by Muhammad XI (last emir of Granada) during the battle of Lucena

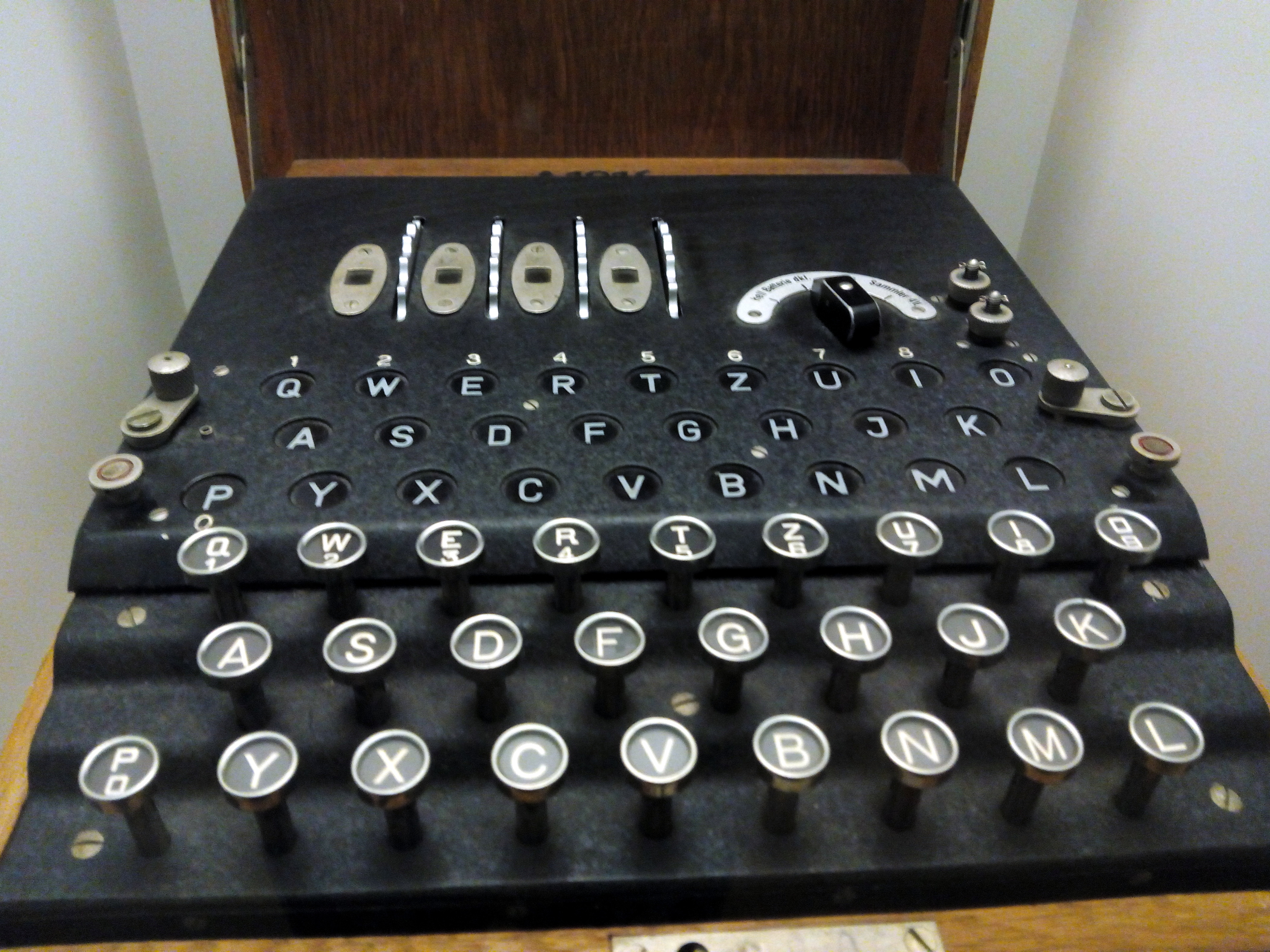
Enigma machine
