= Count of Cabra =

Count of Cabra Conde de Cabra

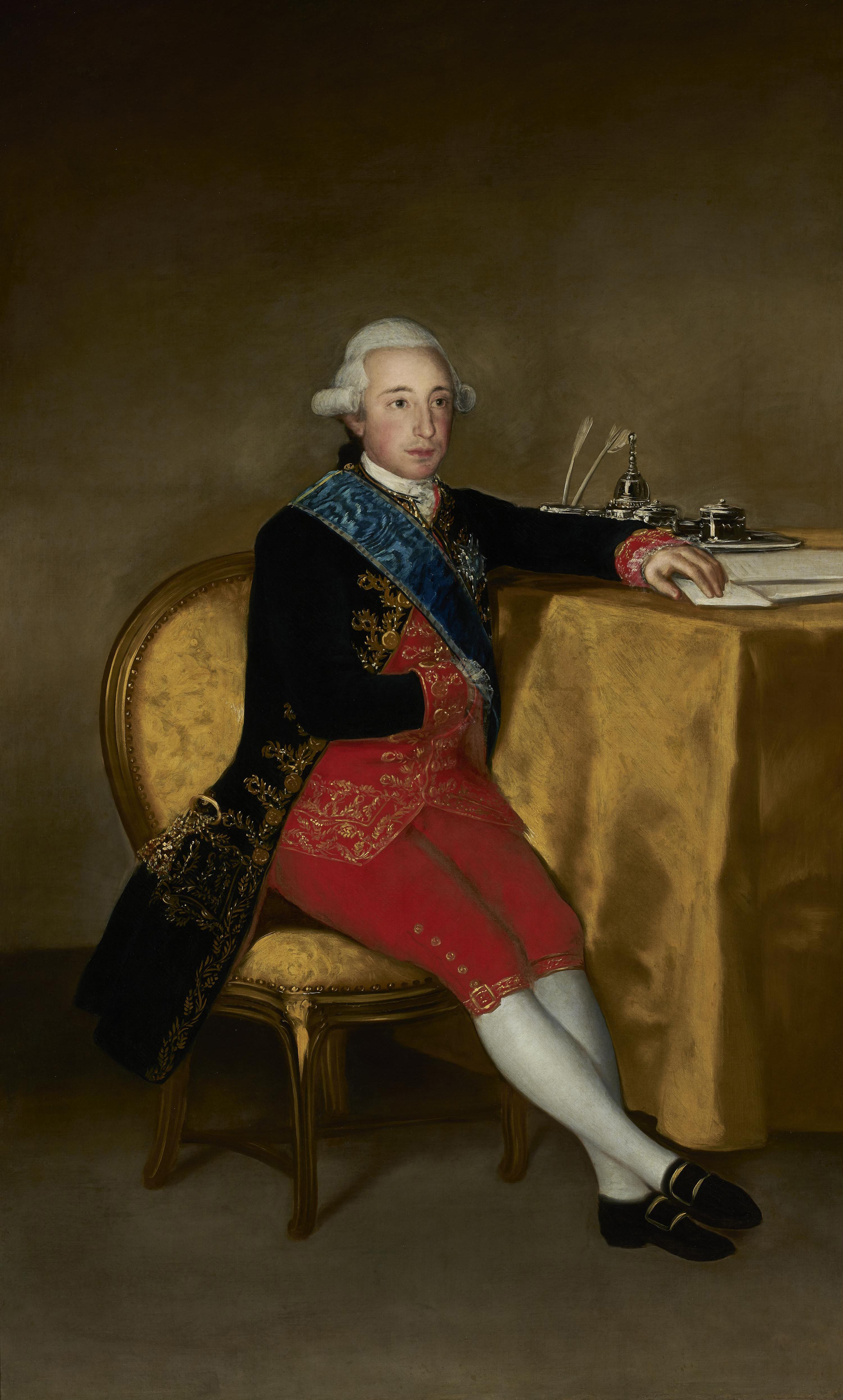
- Vicente Joaquín Osorio de Moscoso, conde de Altamira by Goya
- Parent family: Córdoba
- Country: Spain
- Founded: November 2, 1455 by Henry IV of Castile
- Founder: Diego Fernández de Córdoba y Montemayor
- Current head: Álvaro Francisco López Becerra de Solé y Casanova

Count of Cabra is a Spanish noble title created by King Henry IV of Castile on 2 November 1455 for Diego Fernandez de Cordova and Montemayor, 1st Viscount of Iznájar. The titleholder is a Grandee of Spain, the third oldest such title in Spain.

The name refers to the Andalusian municipality of Cabra in the province of Córdoba. The title is carried by the head of the House of Cabra.

== Count of Cabra, First creation (1380) ==
Prior to the concession of the countship of Cabra to Diego Fernández de Córdoba and Montemayor, Henry II of Castile had granted the title to Henry of Castile (1378–1404), his natural son with Juana de Sousa of Córdoba, who died without descendants as the 1st Duke of Medina Sidonia.

== Count of Cabra, Second creation (1455) ==
#	Title holder	Period
I	Diego Fernández de Córdoba y Montemayor	1455–1481
II	Diego Fernández de Córdoba y Carrillo de Albornoz	1481–1487
III	Diego Fernández de Córdoba y Mendoza	1487–1525
IV	Luis Fernández de Córdoba y Zúñiga	1525–1526
V	Gonzalo II Fernández de Córdoba	1526–1578
VI	Francisca Fernández de Córdoba y Fernández de Córdoba	1578–1597
VII	Antonio Fernández de Córdoba y Cardona	1597–1606
VIII	Luis Fernández de Córdoba y Aragón	1606–1642
IX	Antonio Fernández de Córdoba y Rojas	1642–1659
X	Francisco Fernández de Córdoba y Pimentel (also known as Francisco Fernández de Córdoba Folc de Cardona y Aragón)	1659–1681
XI	Francisco Fernández de Córdoba y Fernández de Córdoba	1681–1685
XII	Félix Fernández de Córdoba y Cardona	1685–1709
XIII	Francisco Fernández de Córdoba y Aragón	1709–1710
XIV	Francisco Javier Fernández de Córdoba y Aragón	1710–1735
XV	Ventura Francisca Fernández de Córdoba y Folch de Cardona y Aragón	1735–1768
XVI	Ventura Osorio de Moscoso y Fernández de Córdoba	1768–1776
XVII	Vicente Joaquín Osorio de Moscoso y Guzmán	1783–1816
XVIII	Vicente Isabel Osorio de Moscoso y Álvarez de Toledo	1816–1837
XIX	Vicente Pío Osorio de Moscoso y Ponce de León	1837–1864
XX	José María Osorio de Moscoso y Carvajal	1864–1881
XXI	Luis Osorio de Moscoso y Borbón	1881–1924
XXII	Francisco Osorio de Moscoso y Jordán de Urríes	1924–1925
XXIII	Ramón Osorio de Moscoso y Taramona	1925–1936
XXIV	María del Perpetuo Socorro Osorio de Moscoso y Reynoso	1939–1952
XXV	Fernando Barón y Osorio de Moscoso	1952–1978
XXVI	María del Pilar Paloma de Casanova y Barón	1978-2012
XXVII	Álvaro Francisco López Becerra de Solé y Casanova	2012–present
