= Elvira Manuel =

Spanish court official

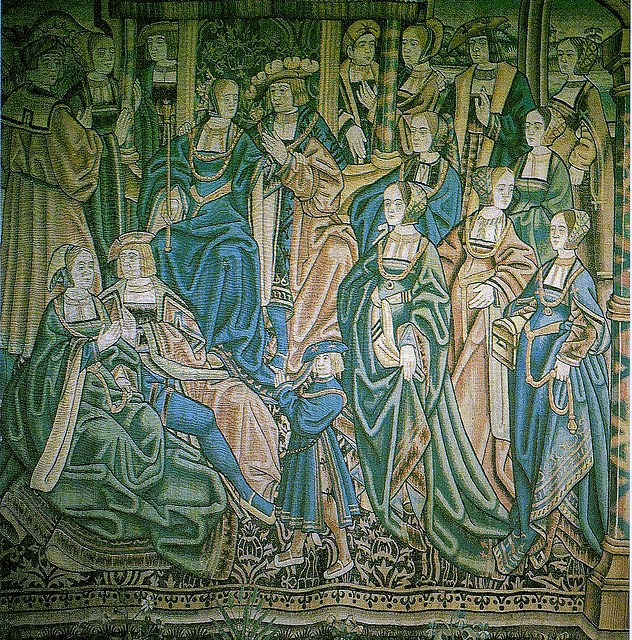
Arthur Prince of Wales & Catherine of Aragon surrounded by her ladies, Elvira among them.

Doña Elvira Manuel de Villena Suárez de Figueroa (c.after 1444–c.after 1506) was a Spanish court official. She served as duenna of Catherine of Aragon.

== Life and career ==
Elvira Manuel was the daughter of Juan Manuel de Villena Fonseca, lord of Belmonte de Campos and Aldonza Suarez de Figueroa, and married to Don Pedro Gomez Manrique.

She was appointed first lady-in-waiting and head of Catherine's female retinue before her departure to England in 1501. While the Count and Countess de Cabra were to act as head of Catherine's household, Elvira Manuel became governess and chaperone and entrusted to act as a mother substitute. She was formally employed as a duena (head of household), camarera mayor (chief lady in waiting) and guarda de las damas (guardian of the ladies), while her husband served as majo-domo and her son Inigo, as master of the pages of Catherine.

She was described as stern and proud. Catherine's mother, Queen Isabella I of Castile, trusted Elvira completely. She and her husband, Ferdinand II of Aragon, instructed the Duke de Estrada that Elvira would order Catherine's household according to her discretion and their orders, and he should see that Catherine do as Elvira advised.

Two years before the death of Queen Isabella in 1504, Catherine's husband, Arthur, Prince of Wales, died. Catherine was then betrothed to the future Henry VIII. Meanwhile, Catherine's sister, Joanna was now reigning with her husband Philip in Castile. Joanna had a mental disability and could not properly rule as queen, so it was Philip who held all the power. Henry VII saw that an alliance with Austria and Castile would serve him better.

By this time, Philip had turned against his father-in-law, Ferdinand, Catherine's father, and took matters into his own hands by arranging with Henry VII that his son, the future Charles V, Holy Roman Emperor, was to be married to Princess Mary Tudor and his daughter Archduchess Eleanor of Austria to Prince Henry. Henry VII then made his son repudiate his betrothal to Catherine and secretly betrothed him to Catherine's niece. Doña Elvira took part in this intrigue as a spy, because she absolutely loathed Ferdinand. Suddenly, in 1506, King Philip died. At this point it was only Aragon that was left as a political option for Henry VII, and he recanted and reinstated the betrothal of Catherine and Prince Henry. Still, it would be three more years before Catherine would marry Henry VIII.

When Catherine later discovered Doña Elvira's betrayal, she immediately dismissed her from her service. On 6 September 1507, Alonso de Esquivel wrote to Miguel Perez Almazan that it had been an horrible hour when Elvira left Catherine's service.
