= Archiepiscopal Palace of Alcalá de Henares =

- Palacio Arzobispal de Alcalá de Henares (Spanish)
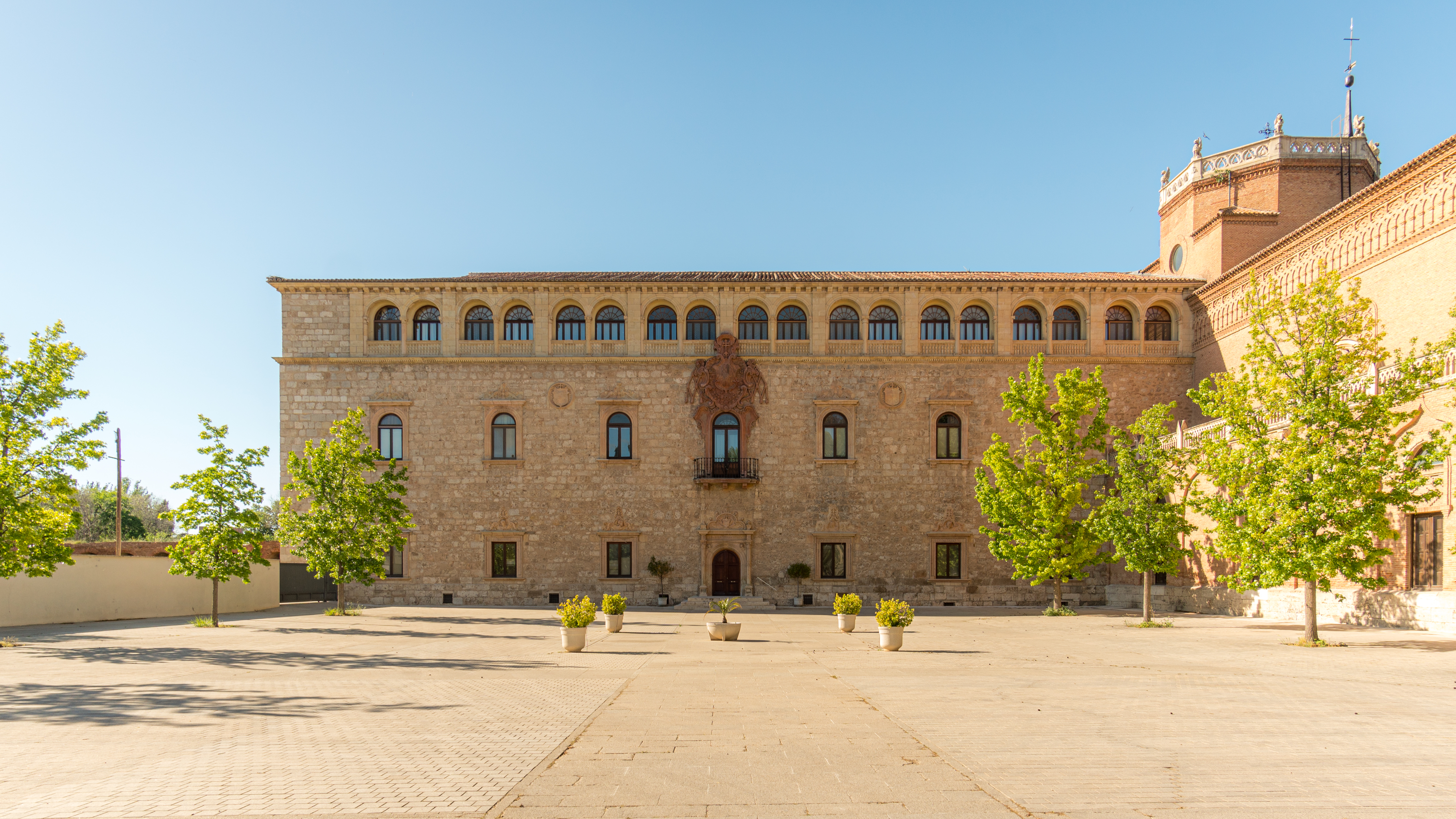
- The Archiepiscopal Palace in 2023.

- Location within Spain
- 40.482435°N 3.369649°W
- Location: Alcalá de Henares, Community of Madrid, Spain

UNESCO World Heritage Site
- Official name: University and Historic Precinct of Alcalá de Henares
- Type: Cultural
- Criteria: ii, iv, vi
- Designated: 1998
- Reference no.: 876
- Session: 22nd
- Region: Europe and North America

Spanish Cultural Heritage
- Official name: Palacio Arzobispal de Alcalá de Henares
- Type: Monument
- Designated: 1931
- Reference no.: RI-51-0000727

The Archiepiscopal Palace of Alcalá de Henares (Spanish: Palacio Arzobispal de Alcalá de Henares) is a palace located in Alcalá de Henares, in the Community of Madrid, Spain. It is now home to the Diocese of Alcalá de Henares. It is located in the Plaza del Palacio and this form part of the monumental set declared World Heritage Site by UNESCO.

The building complex dates from 1209. Two thirds were destroyed in a devastating fire in 1939, during the Spanish Civil War. The part of the building which is preserved is what is left intact after the 1939 fire, the damaged parts were not restored.

In this building came to reside different Castilian monarchs, were held synods and councils, and in here were born the youngest daughter of the Catholic Monarchs and future queen of England, Catherine of Aragon, and Ferdinand I, Holy Roman Emperor, son of Joanna "the Mad". In addition, it is famous for being the place where the first meeting between the Catholic Monarchs and Christopher Columbus was held.

== History ==
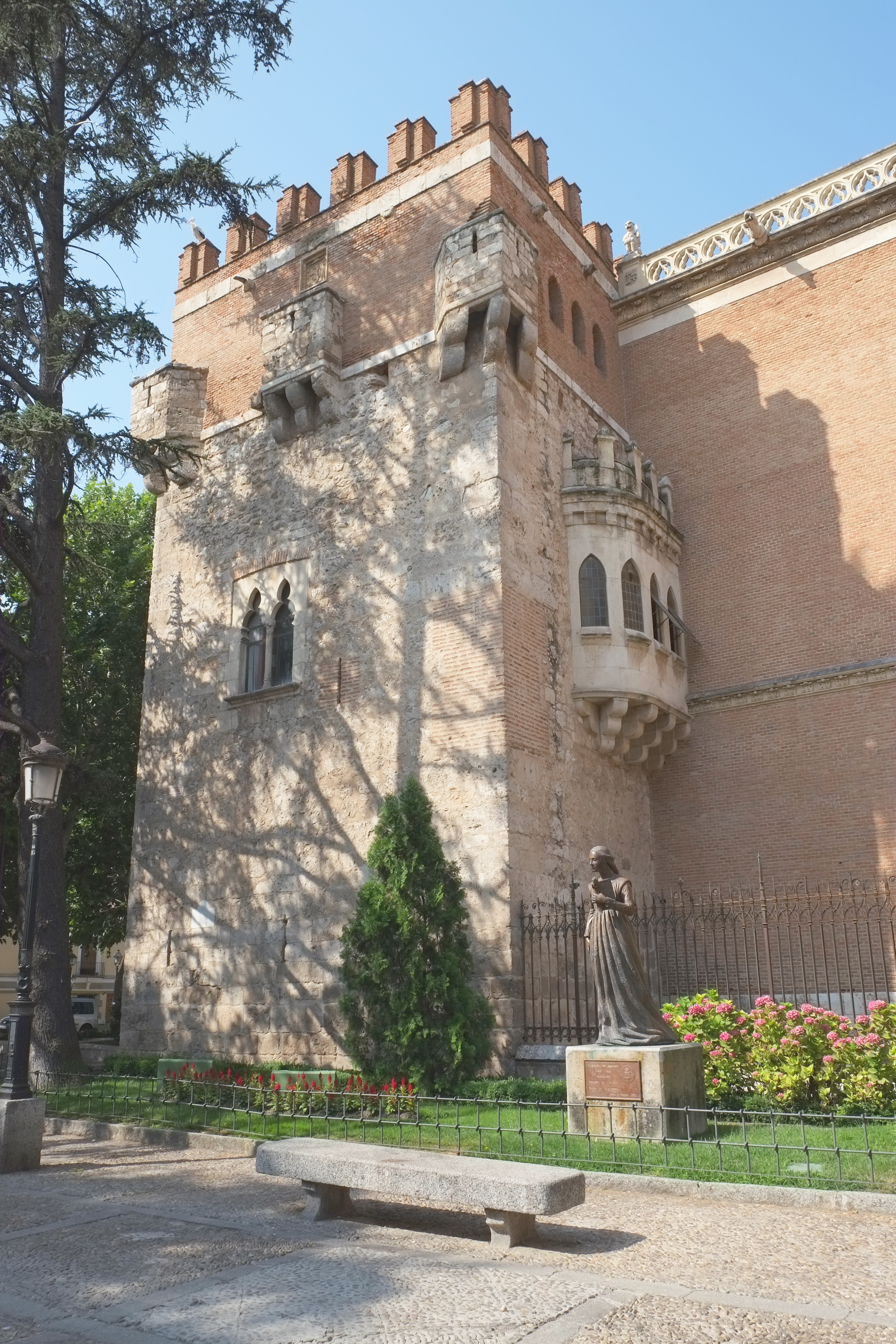
Tower of Tenorio.

First it was a Mudéjar fortress commissioned in 1209 by Archbishop Rodrigo Ximénez de Rada (1209-1247), as a temporary residence of the archbishops of Toledo (Alcalá belonged to the archdiocese) and hence its name. It has suffered several fires and destructions, and has been remodeled several times to the present.

In the Archbishop's Palace were held the Courts in 1348 and was enacted the Ordenamiento de Alcalá, in that was unified the administration of justice to all the lands that formed the Crown of Castile.

In 1308 the kings Ferdinand IV of Castile and James II of Aragon met here to agree and sign the Treaty of Alcalá de Henares by which were distributed the territories obtained from al-Andalusian Taifas during the Reconquista.

Also in the 14th century, Archbishop Pedro Tenorio (1377-1399) rebuilt the building fortifying it. He built a parade courtyard, rectangular, of more than 2 hectares. Surrounded by a walls with 21 towers; all rectangular except the albarrana, which was pentagonal, all attached to them in a semicircular plan. Currently are 16 towers, highlighting the "Tower of Tenorio" named in memory of the Archbishop.

In the 15th century, Archbishop Juan Martínez Contreras (1423-1434) build the east wing, decorated with large Gothic windows, the Anteroom and Hall of the Councils. The latter two were connected by a large túmido arc (in pointed horseshoe), and covered by a formidable Gothic-Mudéjar coffered ceiling.

On 20 January 1486, here was held the first interview between Queen Isabella I of Castile with Christopher Columbus to finance the trip to the Indies.

In 1524 Archbishop Alonso de Fonseca y Ulloa (1523-1534) commissioned the architect Alonso de Covarrubias to construct the west wing, with its courtyards and its magnificent staircase. His successor, Cardinal Juan Pardo de Tavera (1534-1545), finished the work.

Throughout its existence it housed the archives of the diocese of Toledo. Subsequently, its facilities were used for the custody of the Notary Clerks and the Judicial revenue. And from 1858 to 1939 was the Central General Archive of Alcalá de Henares.

Given the saturation of the Archivo de Simancas and its distance to the Court of Madrid, was determined the creation of the Central General Archive in 1858 in the Archbishop's Palace after its assignment to the State for this purpose by Archbishop Cirilo de Alameda y Brea (1857-1872). This Archive received documents from the ministries and agencies suppressed following the reform of 1834. After the regulatory deadlines it forwarded the documents to the National Historical Archive, until on August 12, 1939 a fire destroyed the Central General Archive. Its successor, from 1969 is General Archive of the Administration (AGA), also in Alcalá de Henares.

Since 1991, it is the seat of Bishopric of Alcalá de Henares, and residence of the bishop.

=== Disastrous fire of 1939 ===
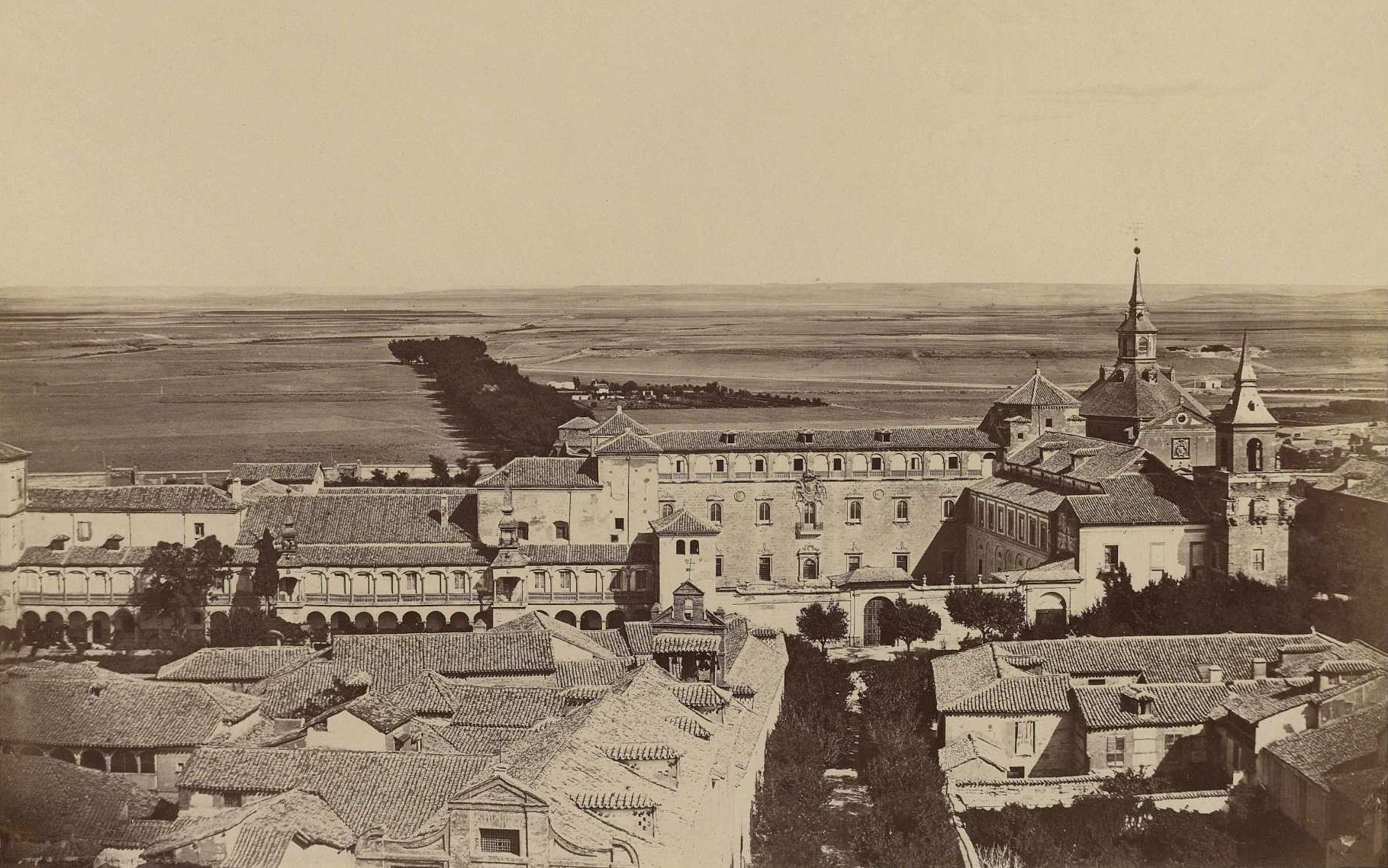
An early 20th century photo showing a complete and aerial view of the Archbishop's Palace of Alcalá before the disastrous 1939 fire.

The Archbishop's Palace was a barracks for tanks and ammunition, both during and after the Civil War, when, for the failure to prevent flammable materials that were there, there was a big fire. It was not the first suffered in its long history, but one of the most voracious, because it destroyed much of the buildings and the documentation kept there for three centuries.

Among the artistic treasures that were lost in the Archbishop's Palace are: the Mudéjar coffered ceiling of the Hall of Councils, the monumental staircase of Covarrubias -architect of the façade-, the courtyard of Fonseca, the courtyard of the Hallelujah, the façade of the courtyard of the Ave Maria, paintings, and the first archaeological museum of the city.

== The building ==
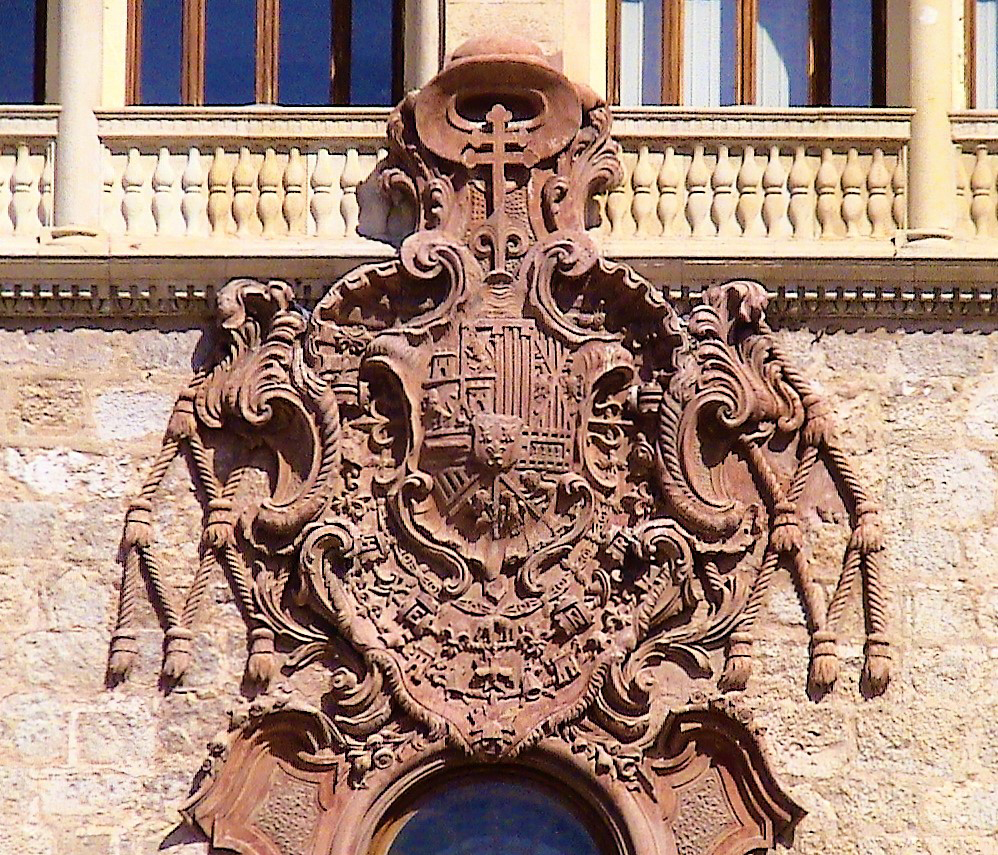
Arms of the Infante Luis Antonio, as Cardinal of Toledo in the main façade of the Archbishop's Palace of Alcalá de Henares.

The building has undergone numerous constructions and rehabilitations, the fire of August 11, 1939 being especially devastating, which destroyed two thirds of its structure: three courtyards ("the Fonseca" or "the Covarrubias", "the Hallelujah" and the "Small garden" or "of the Fountain"), the "Staircase of honor", the "Facade of the Ave Maria", which was of Herrerian style and the "Garden of the Vicar". A rehabilitation of the less damaged parts was completed in 1996 and was necessary.

Currently has 16 towers, highlighting the "Tower of Tenorio". Entering through the parade courtyard, appears the Renaissance main façade of the building. It is divided into two bodies, being the low of ashlar, with two floors of Plateresque windows that joins an upper gallery of gemanates arches. On the central window is a Baroque coat of arms terracotta, which replaced the imperial coat of arms of Charles V, Holy Roman Emperor. The blazon is of the Cardinal-Infante Luis Antonio of Bourbon, son of Philip V, first Bourbon replacing the Habsburg dynasty. This courtyard is closed at south by a cast iron grille, made in Belgium in the 19th century.

In the east wing, where the "Hall of Councils" used to be, underwent a major restoration in its exterior and interior in the 19th century by Juan José Urquijo y Manuel Laredo, following the Neo-Mudéjar style. In 1997 the restored neo-Gothic chapel was opened, which replaced the missing Hall of Councils. In the lower floor a modern auditorium has been made, replacing the "Hall of the Queen Isabella".

=== Missing elements ===
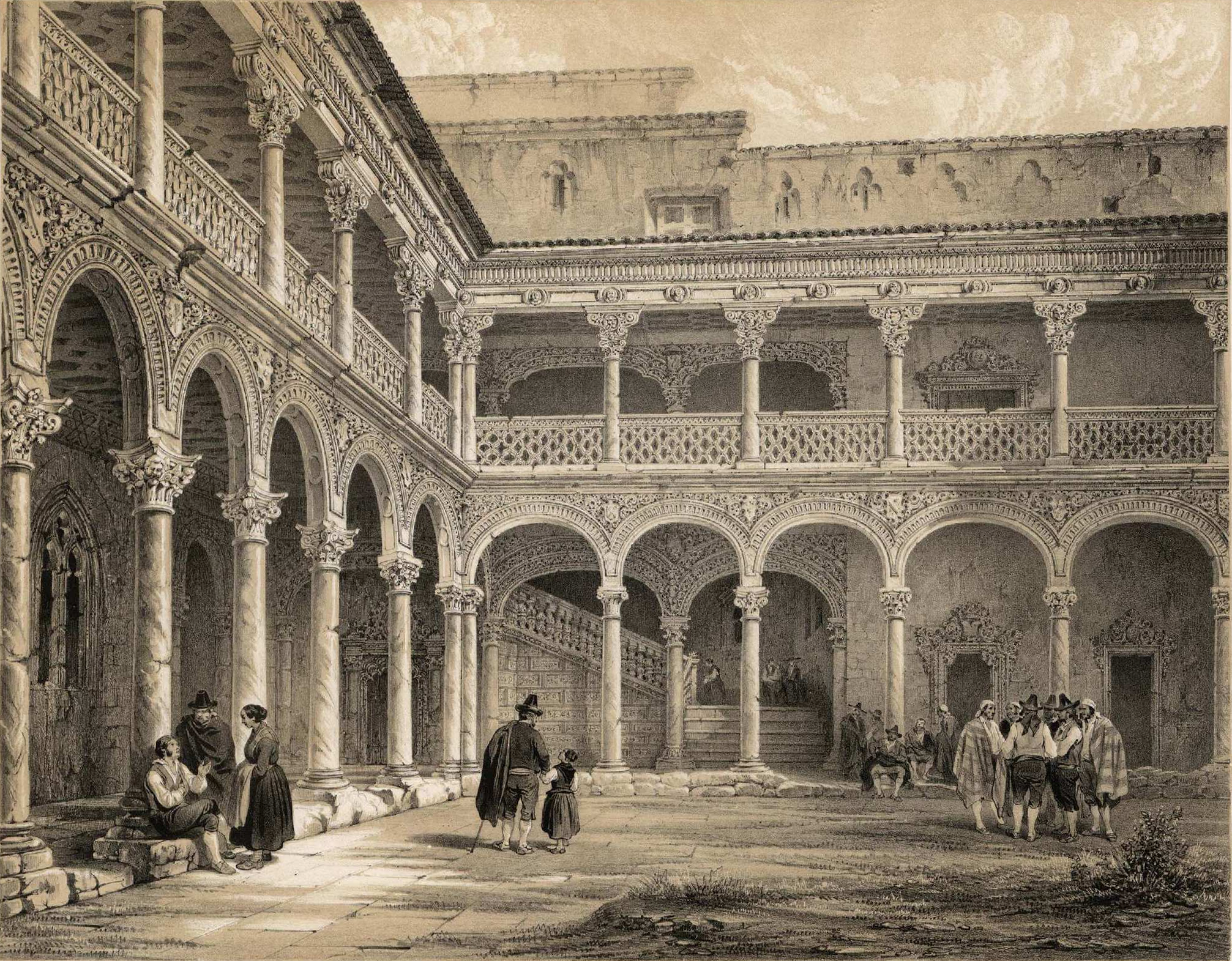
A courtyard of the palace.

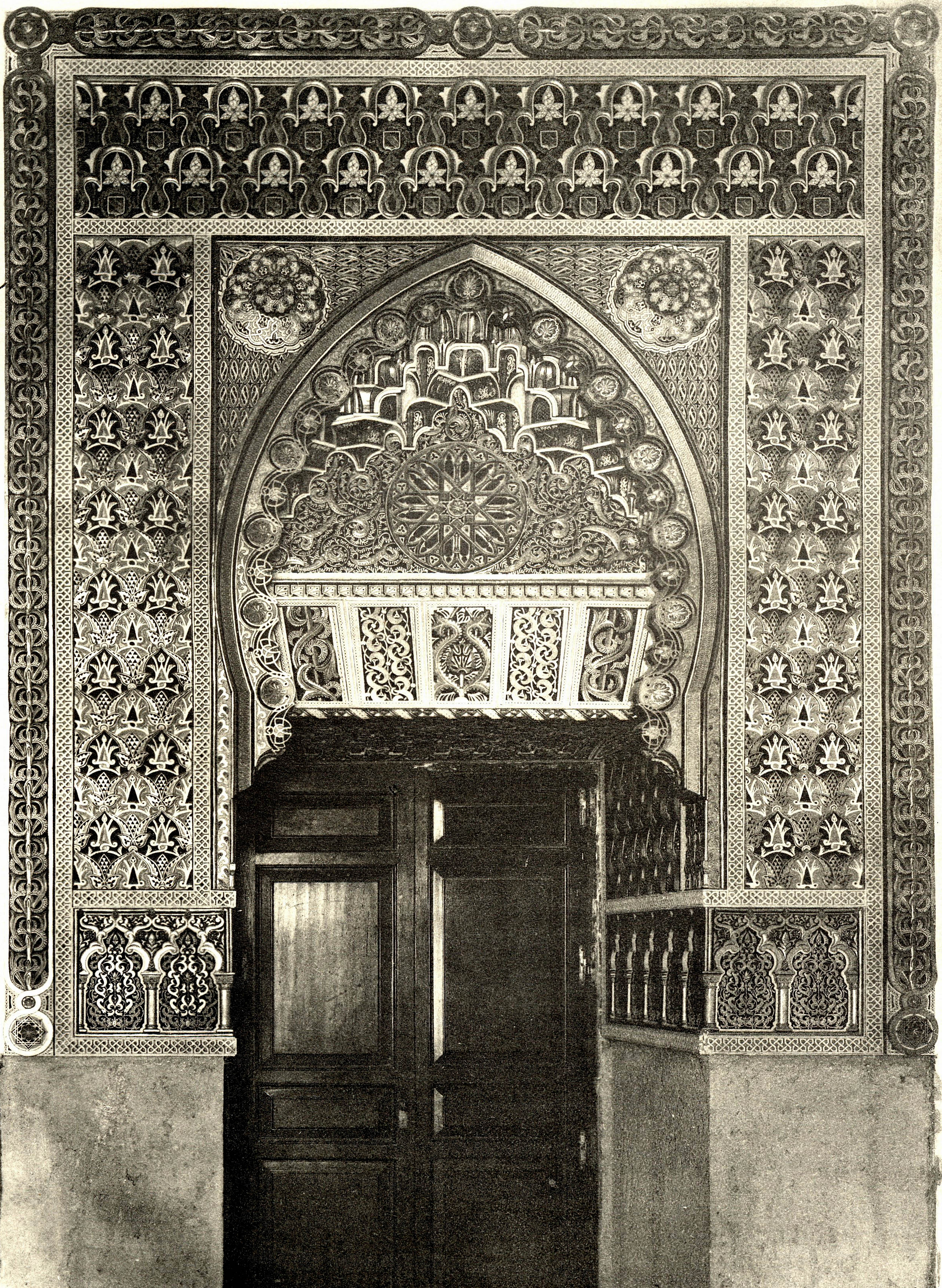
Door of the anteroom to the Hall of Councils.

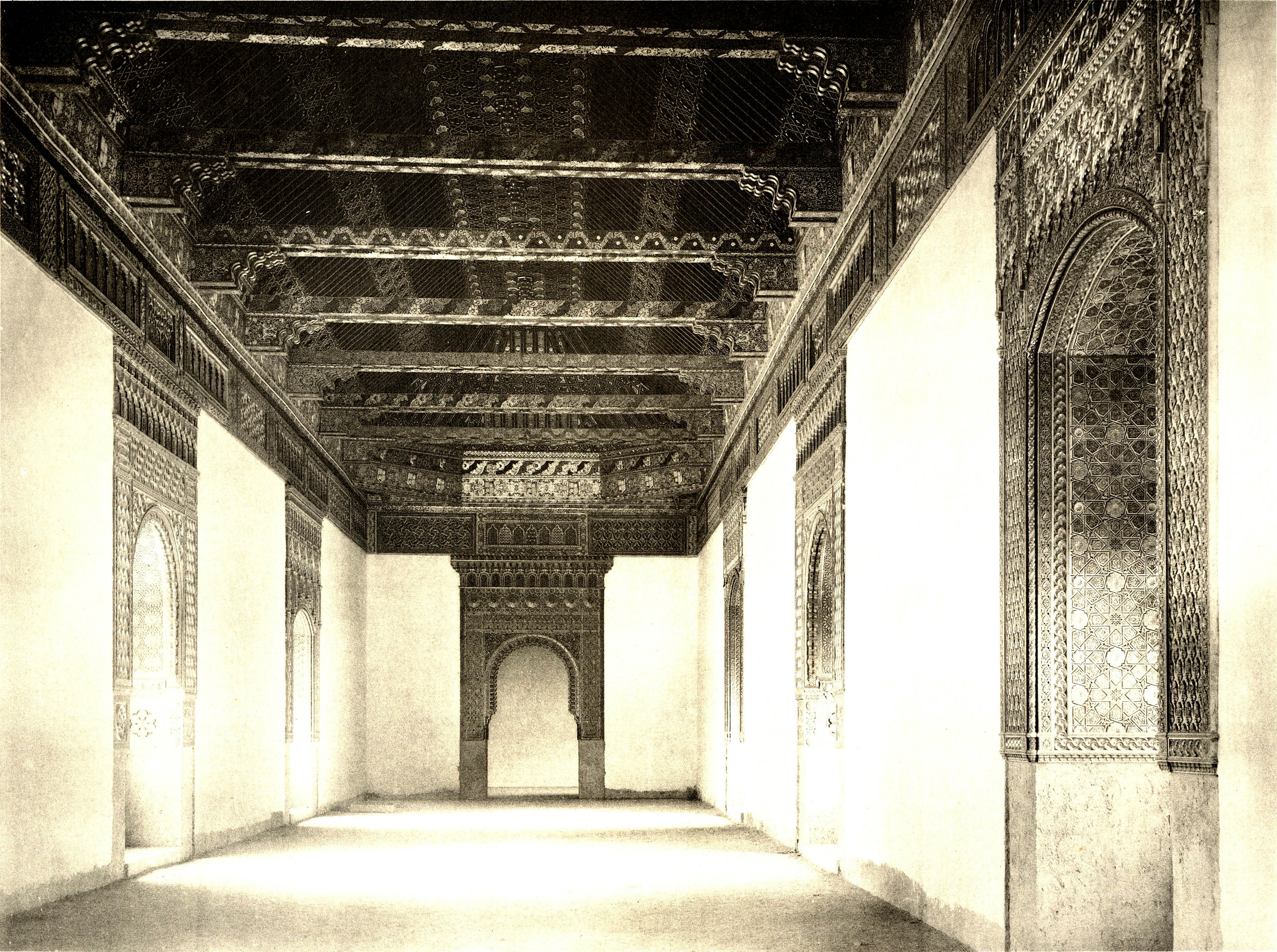
Hall of Councils.

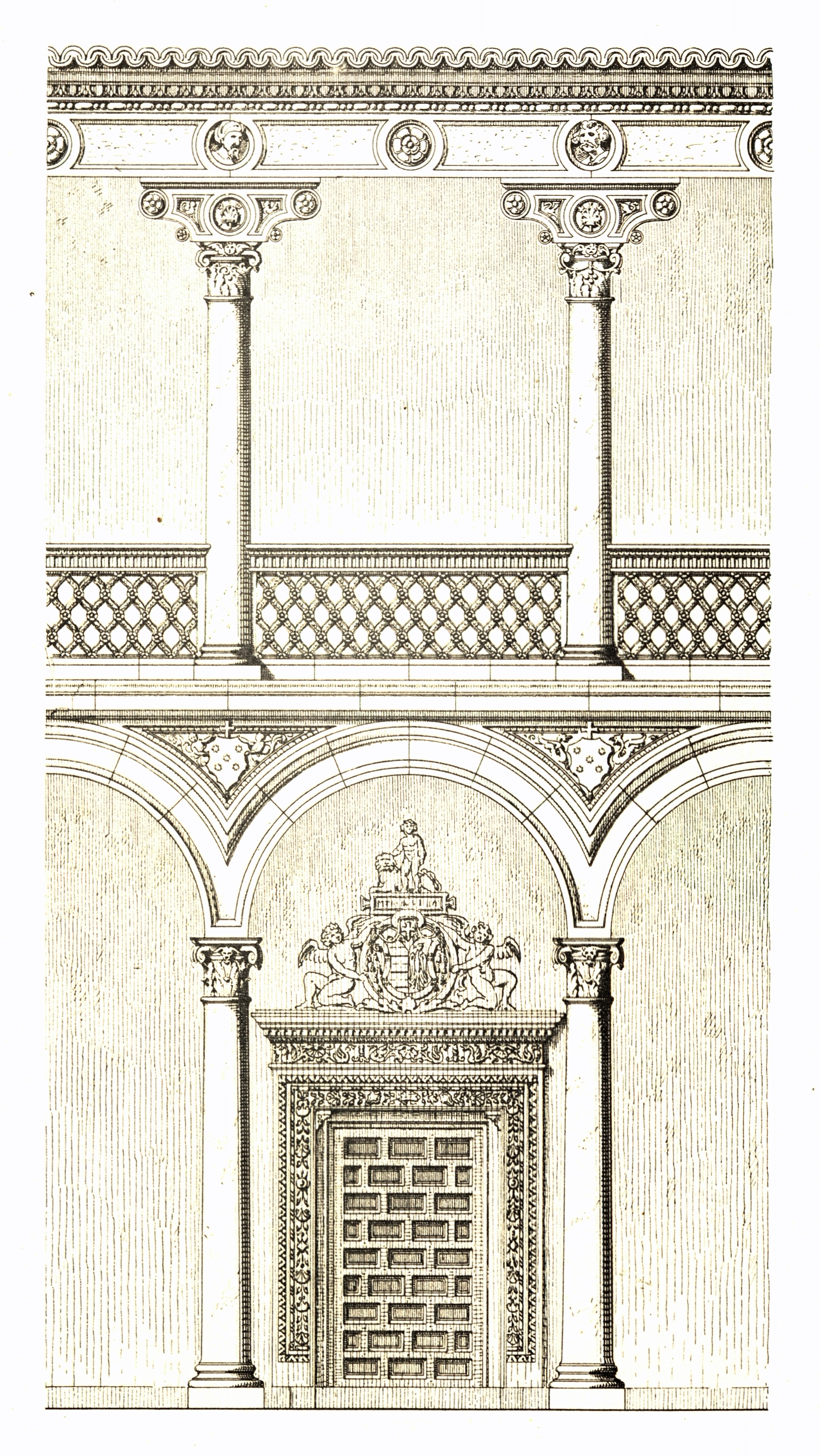
Courtyard of Fonseca.

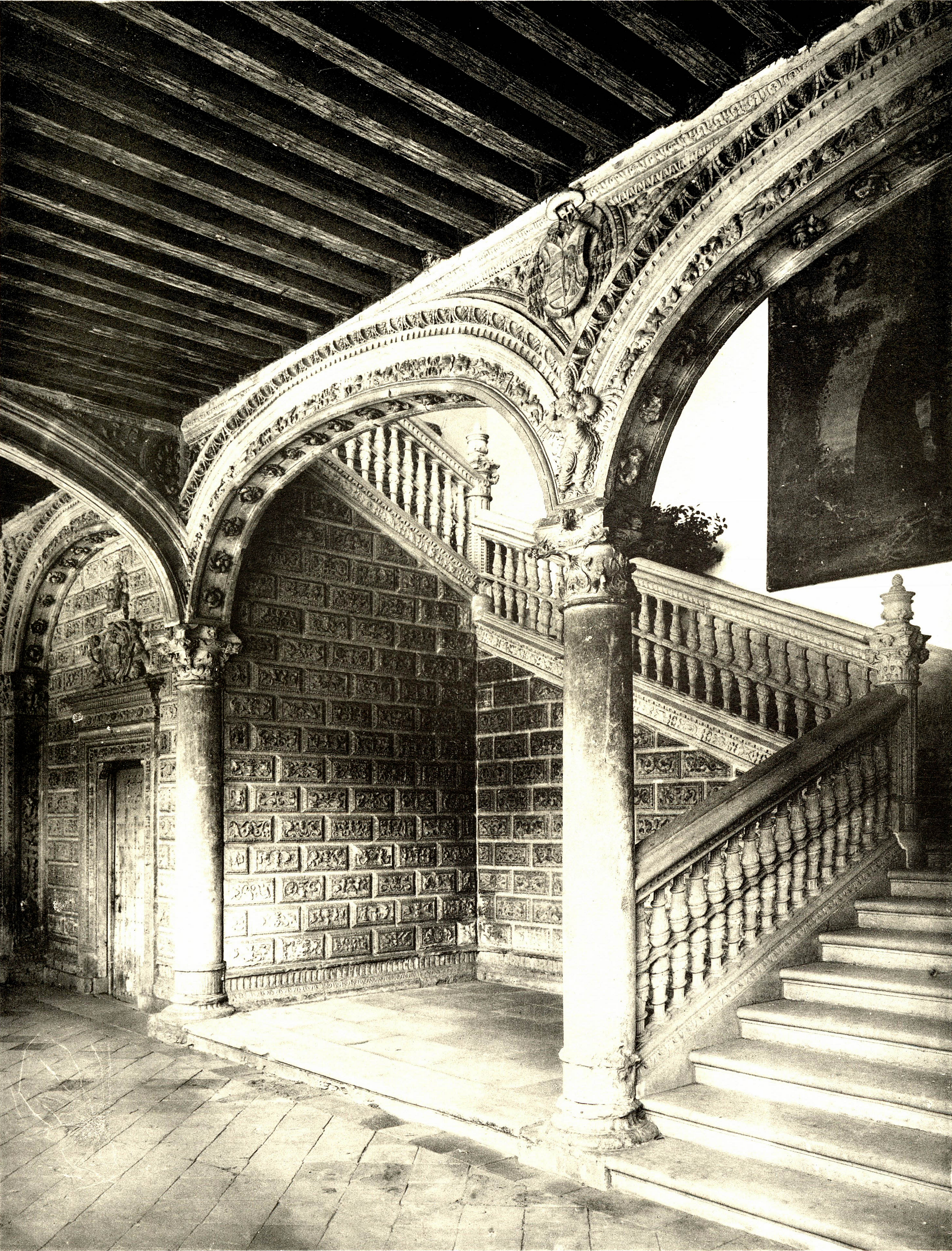
Staircase of Covarrubias.

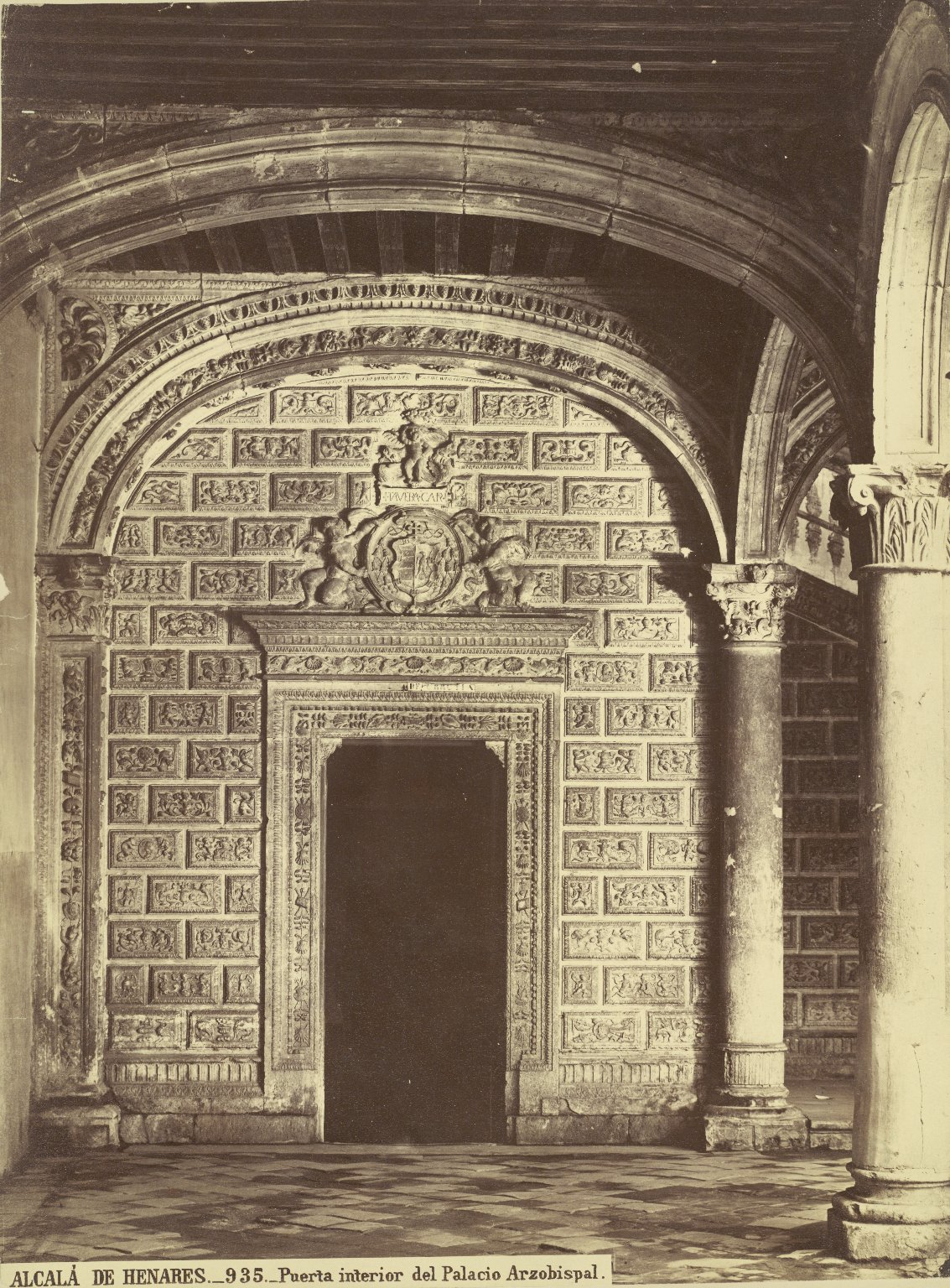
Inner door with the coat of Tavera.

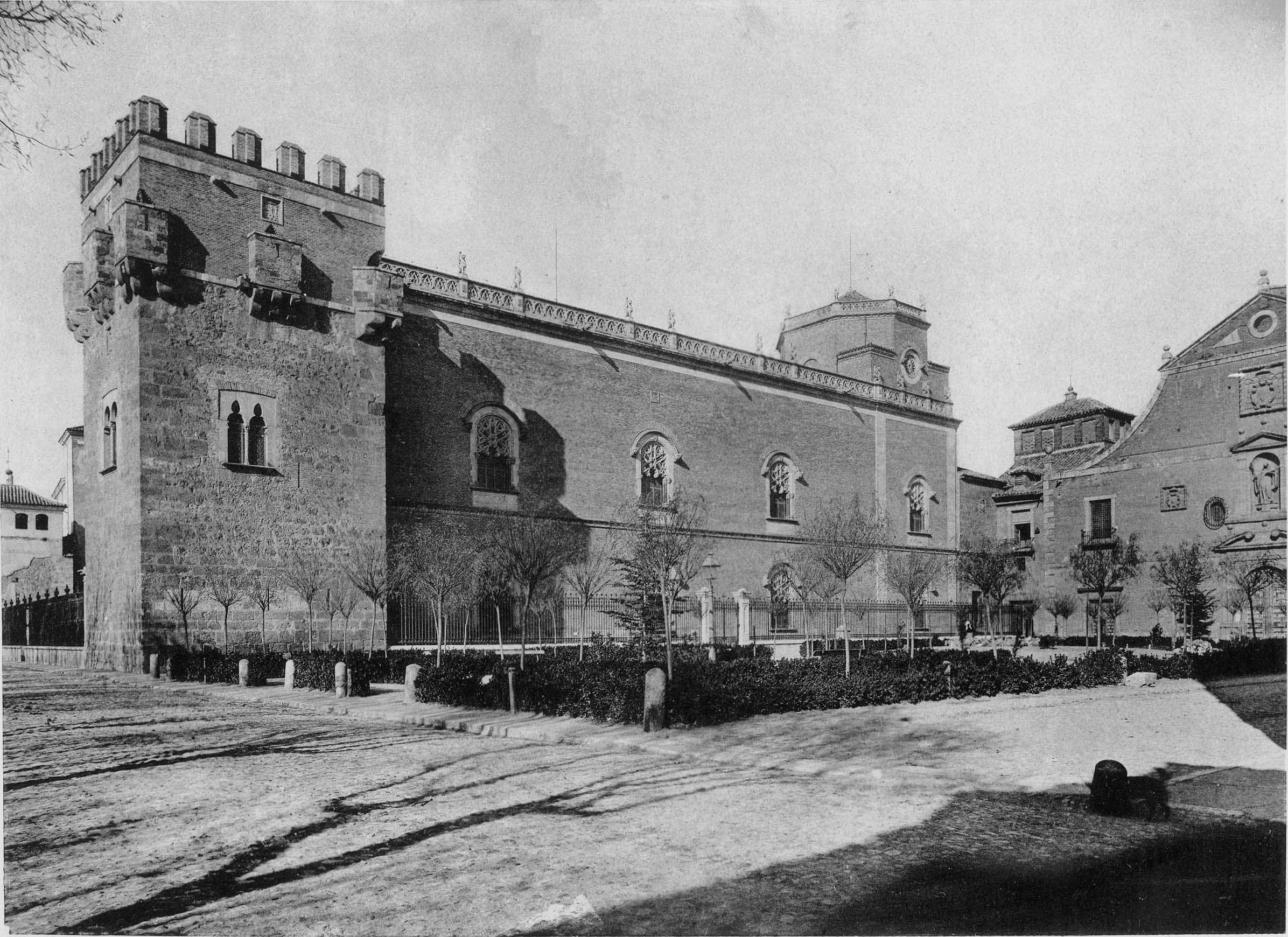
Archbishop's Palace after the fire.

== Antiquarium museum ==
Through the Tower XIV visitors can access the Antiquarium and visit some of those aforementioned remains, which have recreated partially the galleries of the Ave Maria, the large Courtyard of Fonseca and the Staircase of Covarrubias.

For decades the performance outside of the play "Don Juan Tenorio" by José Zorrilla was held in Alcalá, around various monuments, and one of it is always the Archbishop's Palace, in some years being staged exclusively there.

The Antiquarium is an outdoors museum placed in the inside of the walled enclosure and accessible through the fourteenth tower.

== Toponymy ==
The Archbishop's Palace owes its name to that Alcalá de Henares for eight hundred years belonged to the jurisdiction of the archbishops of Toledo, who were also the primates -the most preeminent- of all Spain, and that here had their residence. This meant that Alcalá de Henares was always at the center of religious power, which for centuries was also synonymous with the political.

== Historical people ==
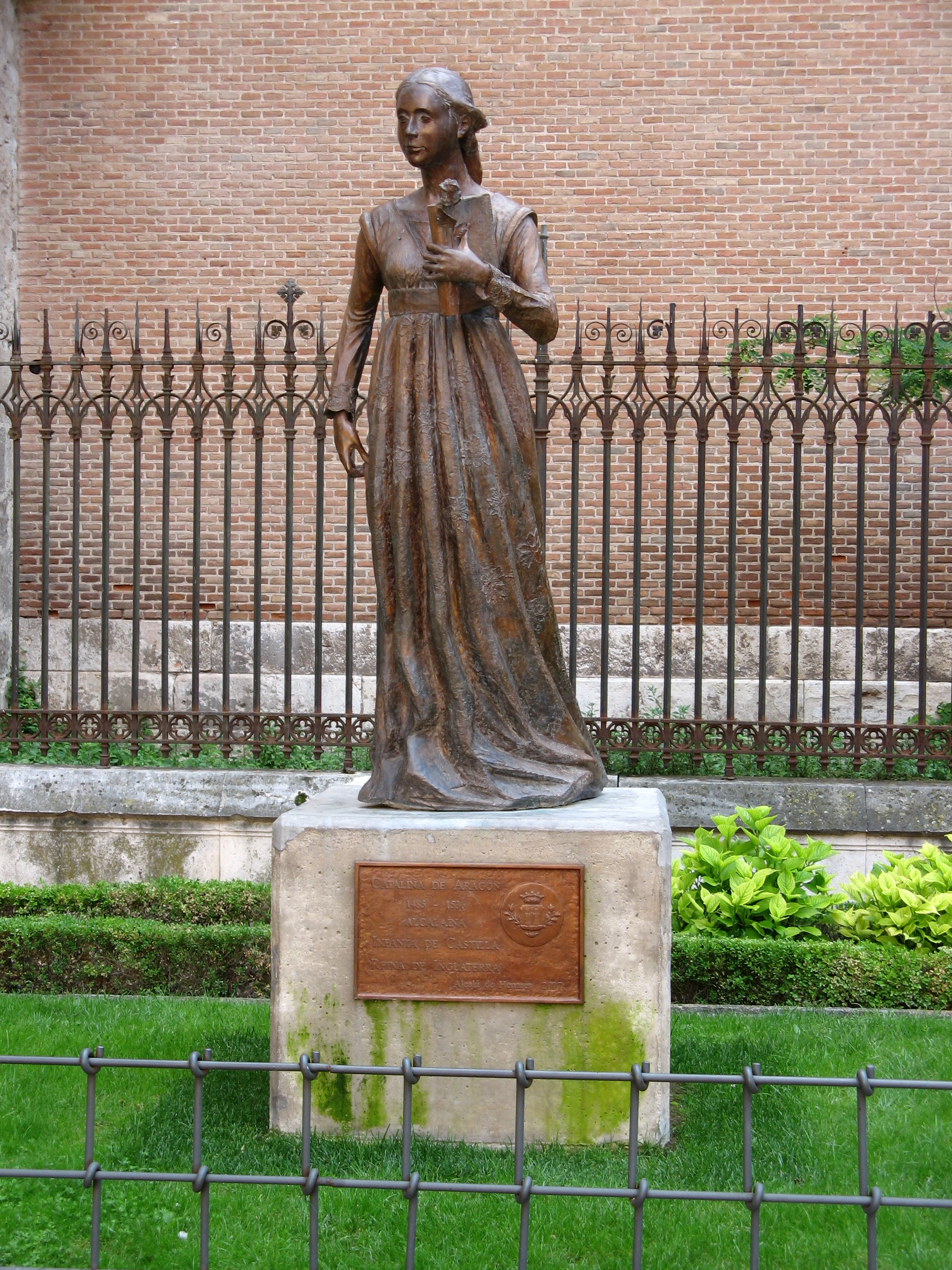
Statue of Catherine of Aragon under the Tower of Tenorio.

=== Monarchs that born, lived and died in the Archbishop's Palace ===
In the Archbishop's Palace, many members of the court lived and died, including the Castilian King John I in 1390, after falling off his horse nearby. Other monarchs used it as a temporary residence, for example, the Catholic Monarchs; their daughter, Catherine of Aragon (who would be queen of England as wife of Henry VIII of England) was born there. Here in this Archbishop Palace too was born Ferdinand I, Holy Roman Emperor, son of Joanna the Mad and Holy Roman Emperor as successor of Charles V, Holy Roman Emperor (Charles I of Spain).

=== Others who died in the Archbishop's Palace ===
- Jimeno Martínez de Luna (¿? - 1338): Archbishop.
- Sancho de Rojas (1372 - 1422): Archbishop and soldier.
- Juan Martínez de Contreras (¿? - 1434): Archbishop and lawyer.
- Alfonso Carrillo de Acuña (1410 - 1482): Archbishop.
- Alonso III Fonseca (1475 - 1534): Archbishop.
- García Loaysa y Girón (1534 - 1599): Archbishop and writer.

== Archbishop's Palace of Alcalá de Henares in audiovisual media ==
In its facilities partially or totally recorded several film productions:

=== Movies ===
- 1918: Los intereses creados by Jacinto Benavente and Ricardo Puga
- 1928: El guerrillero by José Buchs
- 1931: Isabel de Solís, reina de Granada by José Buchs
- 1934: El agua en el suelo by Eusebio Fernández Ardavín
- 1943: El escándalo by José Luis Sáenz de Heredia
- 1960: La rana verde by José María Forn
- 1967: Sor Citroen by Pedro Lazaga
- 1972: Carta de amor de un asesino by Francisco Regueiro
- 1972: ¡Qué nos importa la revolución! by Sergio Corbucci
- 1973: Lo verde empieza en los Pirineos by Vicente Escrivá
- 1974: Una pareja... distinta by José María Forqué
- 1977: Paraíso by Miguel Luxemburgo (José Miguel Ganga)
- 1986: Dragón Rapide by Jaime Camino

=== Documentaries ===
- 1935: Alcalá de Henares by Daniel Jorro
- 1943: Alcalá de Henares by Francisco Mora
- 1946: Alcalá, la cervantina by Juan A. Durán
- 1946: Compluto Alcalá de Henares by Luis Meléndez Galán
- 1970: Alcalá de Cervantes by Raúl Peña Nalda
- 1971: Ruta colombina by Augusto Fenollar
- 1992: Sueños de fortuna by Pedro Martínez Oses
- 2013: El Palacio de los Arzobispos de Toledo en Alcalá de Henares by Gustavo Chamorro Merino and Ángel Pérez López
