= Spanish Chronicle =

Chronicle on Tudor England

The Chronicle of King Henry VIII of England, commonly known as the Spanish Chronicle, is a chronicle written during the reigns of Henry VIII and Edward VI by an unknown author, based on eyewitness accounts such as that of Francisco Felipe.

The chronicle was translated from Spanish and published with notes in 1889, by the respected historian Martin Hume. Hume appears to have regarded the work as an authentic contemporary document from the 16th century that related an eyewitness account of various events in the Tudor period. Alison Weir, in The Six Wives of Henry VIII, notes that the Spanish Chronicle is "notoriously inaccurate".
