= Catherine of Aragon =

Queen of England from 1509 to 1533

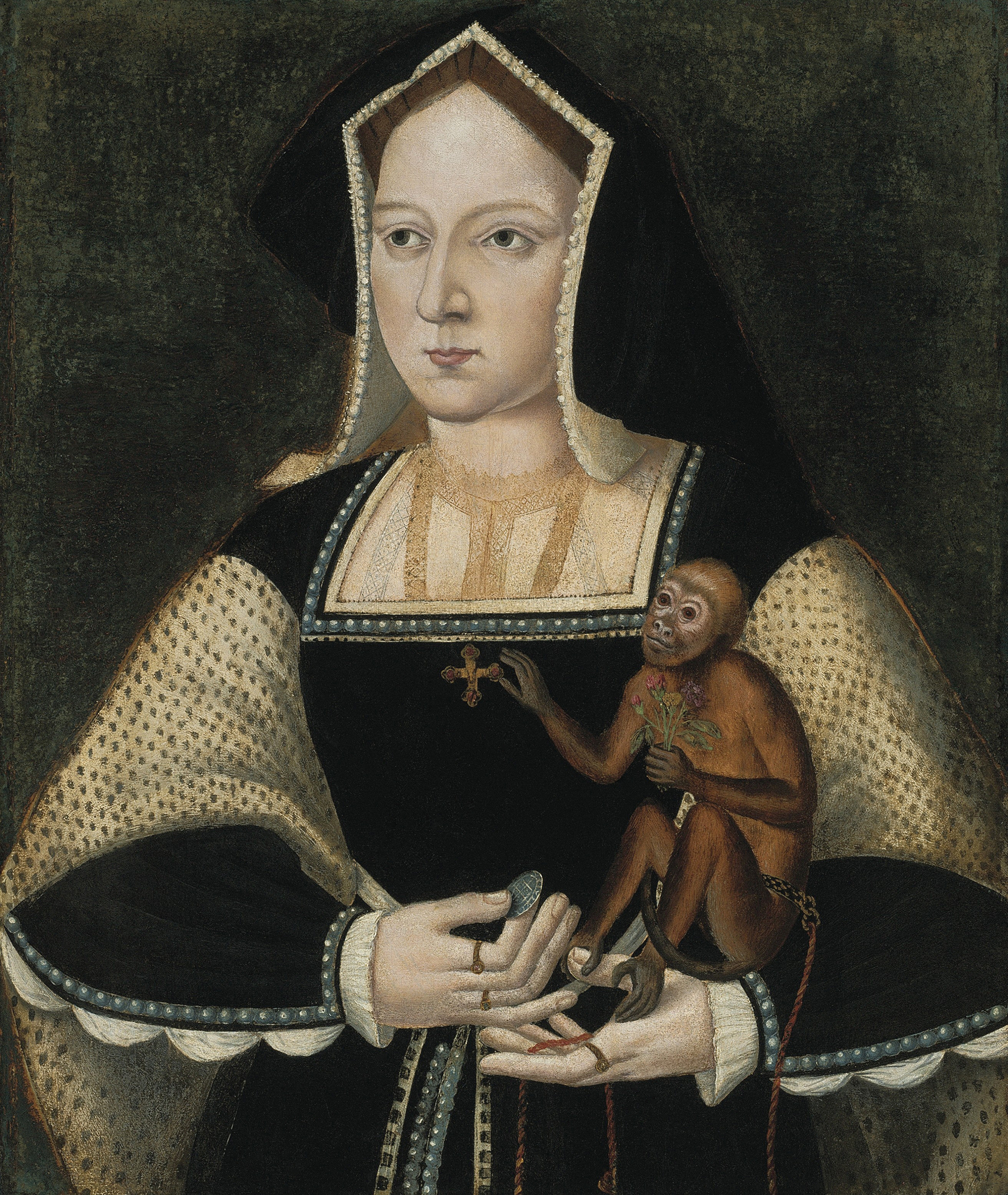
- Portrait by Lucas Horenbout, c. 1525

Queen consort of England
- Tenure: 11 June 1509 – 23 May 1533
- Coronation: 24 June 1509
- Born: 16 December 1485; Archiepiscopal Palace, Alcalá de Henares, Castile, Spain
- Died: 7 January 1536 (aged 50); Kimbolton Castle, Huntingdonshire, England
- Burial: 29 January 1536; Peterborough Cathedral, England
- Spouses: Arthur, Prince of Wales (m. 1501; died 1502) Henry VIII of England (m. 1509; ann. 1533) (Note: Annulment reversed during the reign of Mary I in 1553.)
- Issue more...: Henry, Duke of Cornwall; Mary I, Queen of England
- House: Trastámara
- Father: Ferdinand II of Aragon
- Mother: Isabella I of Castile

Catherine of Aragon (also spelled Katherine; Spanish: Catalina de Aragón; 16 December 1485 – 7 January 1536) was Queen of England as the first wife of Henry VIII from their marriage on 11 June 1509 until its annulment on 23 May 1533. She had previously been Princess of Wales as the wife of Henry's elder brother Arthur, Prince of Wales for a short time before his death.

Catherine was born at the Archbishop's Palace of Alcalá de Henares, and was the youngest child of Isabella I of Castile and Ferdinand II of Aragon. She was three years old when she was betrothed to Arthur, the eldest son of Henry VII of England. They married in 1501, but Arthur died five months later. Catherine spent years in limbo, and during this time, she held the position of ambassador of the Aragonese crown to England in 1507, the first known female ambassador in European history. She married Henry VIII shortly after his accession in 1509. For six months in 1513, she served as regent of England while Henry was in France. During that time the English defeated a Scottish invasion at the Battle of Flodden, an event in which Catherine played an important part with an emotional speech about courage and patriotism.

By 1526, Henry was infatuated with Anne Boleyn and dissatisfied that his marriage to Catherine had produced no surviving sons, leaving their daughter Mary as heir presumptive at a time when there was no established precedent for a woman on the throne. He sought to have their marriage annulled, setting in motion a chain of events that led to England's schism from the Catholic Church. When Pope Clement VII refused to annul the marriage, Henry defied him by assuming supremacy over religious matters in England and marrying Anne secretly in 1532.

In 1533, Catherine's marriage was declared invalid by Henry's new Anglican Church, which subsequently validated his marriage to Anne without reference to the pope. Catherine refused to accept Henry as supreme head of the Church in England and considered herself the King's rightful wife and queen, attracting much popular sympathy. Despite this, Henry acknowledged her only as dowager princess of Wales. After being banished from court by Henry, Catherine lived out the remainder of her life at Kimbolton Castle, dying there in January 1536, probably of cancer. The English people held Catherine in high esteem, and her death set off tremendous mourning. Her daughter Mary became the first undisputed English queen regnant in 1553.

Catherine commissioned The Education of a Christian Woman by Juan Luis Vives, who dedicated the book, controversial at the time, to the Queen in 1523. Such was Catherine's impression on people that even her adversary Thomas Cromwell said of her, "If not for her sex, she could have defied all the heroes of History." She successfully appealed for the lives of the rebels involved in the Evil May Day, for the sake of their families, and also won widespread admiration by starting an extensive programme for the relief of the poor. Catherine was a patron of Renaissance humanism and a friend of the great scholars Erasmus and Thomas More.

== Early life ==
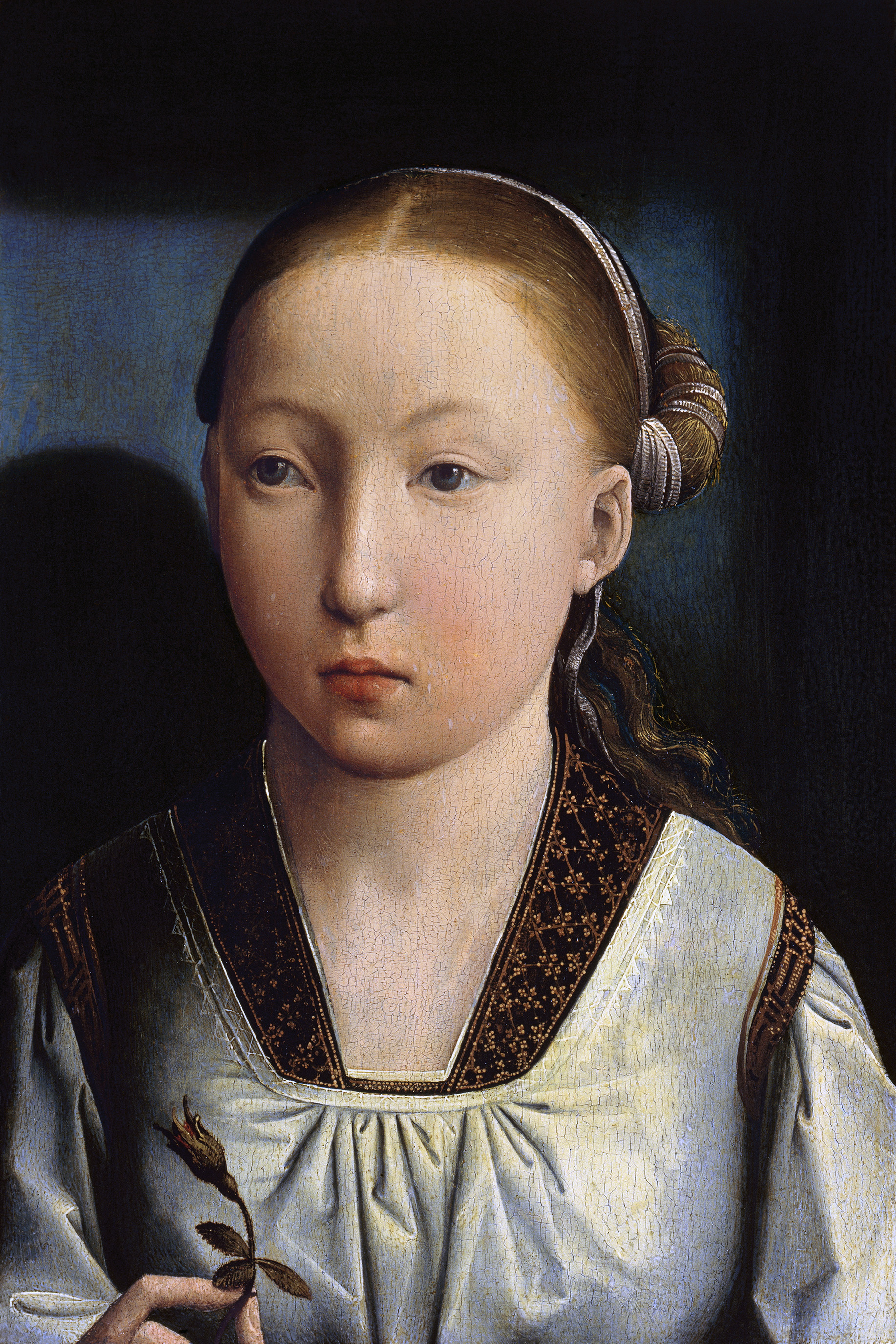
Portrait by Juan de Flandes thought to be of 11-year-old Catherine. She resembles her sister Joanna.

Catherine was born at the Archbishop's Palace of Alcalá de Henares near Madrid, in the early hours of 16 December 1485. She was the youngest surviving child of King Ferdinand II of Aragon and Queen Isabella I of Castile. Her siblings were Joanna, Queen of Castile and of Aragon; Isabella, Queen of Portugal; John, Prince of Asturias; and Maria, Queen of Portugal.

Catherine was quite short in stature with long red hair, wide blue eyes, a round face, and a fair complexion. She was descended, on her maternal side, from the House of Lancaster, an English royal house; her great-grandmother Catherine of Lancaster, after whom she was named, and her great-great-grandmother Philippa of Lancaster were both daughters of John of Gaunt and granddaughters of Edward III of England. Consequently, she was third cousin of her father-in-law, Henry VII of England, and fourth cousin of her mother-in-law Elizabeth of York.

Catherine was educated by a tutor, Alessandro Geraldini, who was a clerk in Holy Orders. She studied arithmetic, canon and civil law, classical literature, genealogy and heraldry, history, philosophy, religion, and theology. She had a strong religious upbringing and developed her Catholic faith that would play a major role in later life. She learned to speak, read and write in Castilian Spanish and Latin, and spoke French and Greek. Erasmus later said that Catherine "loved good literature which she had studied with success since childhood". She had been given lessons in domestic skills, such as cooking, embroidery, lace-making, needlepoint, sewing, spinning, and weaving and was also taught music, dancing, drawing, as well as being carefully educated in good manners and court etiquette.

At an early age, Catherine was considered a suitable wife for Arthur, Prince of Wales, heir apparent to the English throne. The two were married by proxy on 19 May 1499 and corresponded in Latin until Arthur turned fifteen, when it was decided that they were old enough to begin their conjugal life.

Catherine was accompanied to England by the following ambassadors: Diego Fernández de Córdoba y Mendoza, 3rd Count of Cabra; Alonso de Fonseca y Acevedo, Archbishop of Santiago de Compostela; and Antonio de Rojas Manrique, Bishop of Mallorca. Her Spanish retinue, including Francisco Felipe, was supervised by her duenna, Elvira Manuel.

At first it was thought Catherine's ship would arrive at Gravesend. A number of English gentlewomen were appointed to be ready to welcome her on arrival in October 1501. They were to escort Catherine in a flotilla of barges on the Thames to the Tower of London.

== As wife and widow of Arthur ==
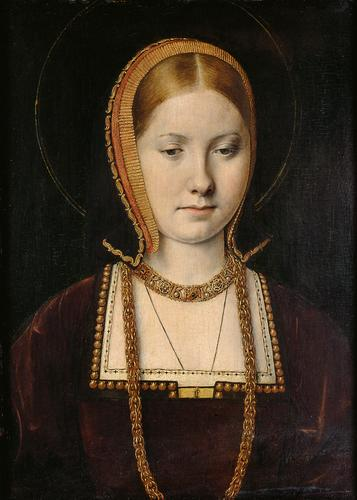
Portrait, possibly of Catherine of Aragon c. 1502, or Mary Tudor, Queen of France, c. 1514 Michael Sittow

Then-15-year-old Catherine departed from A Coruña on 17 August 1501 and met Arthur on 4 November at Dogmersfield in Hampshire. Little is known about their first impressions of each other, but Arthur did write to his parents-in-law that he would be "a true and loving husband" and told his parents that he was immensely happy to "behold the face of his lovely bride". The couple had corresponded in Latin, but found that they could not understand each other's spoken conversation, because they had learned different Latin pronunciations. Ten days later, on 14 November 1501, they were married at Old St. Paul's Cathedral, both 15 years old. A dowry of 200,000 ducats had been agreed, and half was paid shortly after the marriage. It was noted that Catherine and her Spanish ladies in waiting were dressed in Spanish style at her arrival and at the wedding.

Once married, Arthur was sent to Ludlow Castle on the borders of Wales to preside over the Council of Wales and the Marches, as was his duty as Prince of Wales, and his bride accompanied him. A few months later, they both became ill, possibly with the sweating sickness, which was sweeping the area. Arthur died on 2 April 1502; 16-year-old Catherine recovered to find herself a widow.

At this point, Henry VII faced the challenge of avoiding the obligation to return her 200,000-ducat dowry, half of which he had not yet received, to her father, as required by her marriage contract should she return home. Following the death of Queen Elizabeth in February 1503, there were rumours of a potential marriage between Catherine and King Henry; such rumours were, however, unsubstantiated. It was agreed that Catherine would marry Henry VII's second son, Henry, Duke of York, who was five years younger than she was. The death of Catherine's mother, however, meant that her "value" in the marriage market decreased. Castile was a much larger realm than the Crown of Aragon, and it was inherited by Catherine's elder sister, Joanna. Ostensibly, the marriage was delayed until Henry was old enough, but Ferdinand II procrastinated so much over payment of the remainder of Catherine's dowry that it became doubtful that the marriage would take place. She lived as a virtual prisoner at Durham House in London. Some of the letters she wrote to her father complaining of her treatment have survived. In one of these letters she tells him that "I choose what I believe, and say nothing. For I am not as simple as I may seem." She had little money and struggled to cope, as she had to support her ladies-in-waiting as well as herself. In 1507 she served as the Spanish ambassador to England, the first female ambassador in European history. While Henry VII and his counsellors expected her to be easily manipulated, Catherine went on to prove them wrong.

Marriage to Arthur's brother depended on the Pope granting a dispensation because canon law forbade a man to marry his brother's widow. Catherine testified that her marriage to Arthur was never consummated as, also according to canon law, a marriage could be dissolved if it was not consummated.

== Queen of England ==
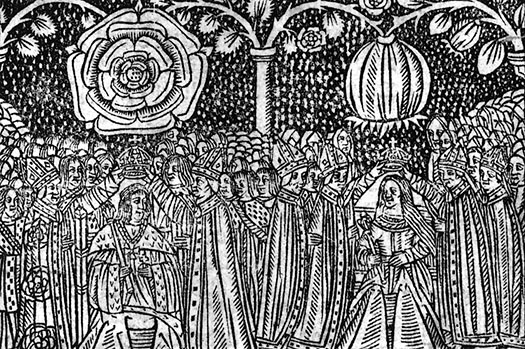
16th-century woodcut of the coronation of Henry VIII and Catherine of Aragon showing their heraldic badges, the Tudor rose and the Pomegranate of Granada

=== Wedding ===
Catherine's second wedding took place on 11 June 1509, seven years after Prince Arthur's death. She married Henry VIII, who had only just acceded to the throne, in a private ceremony in the church of the Observant Friars outside Greenwich Palace. She was 23 years of age.

=== Coronation ===
On Saturday 23 June 1509, the traditional eve-of-coronation procession to Westminster Abbey was greeted by a large and enthusiastic crowd. As was the custom, the couple spent the night before their coronation at the Tower of London. On Midsummer's Day, Sunday, 24 June 1509, Henry VIII and Catherine were anointed and crowned together by the Archbishop of Canterbury at a lavish ceremony at Westminster Abbey. The coronation was followed by a banquet in Westminster Hall. Many new Knights of the Bath were created in honour of the coronation. In that month that followed, many social occasions presented the new Queen to the English public. She made a fine impression and was well received by the people of England.

=== Influence ===
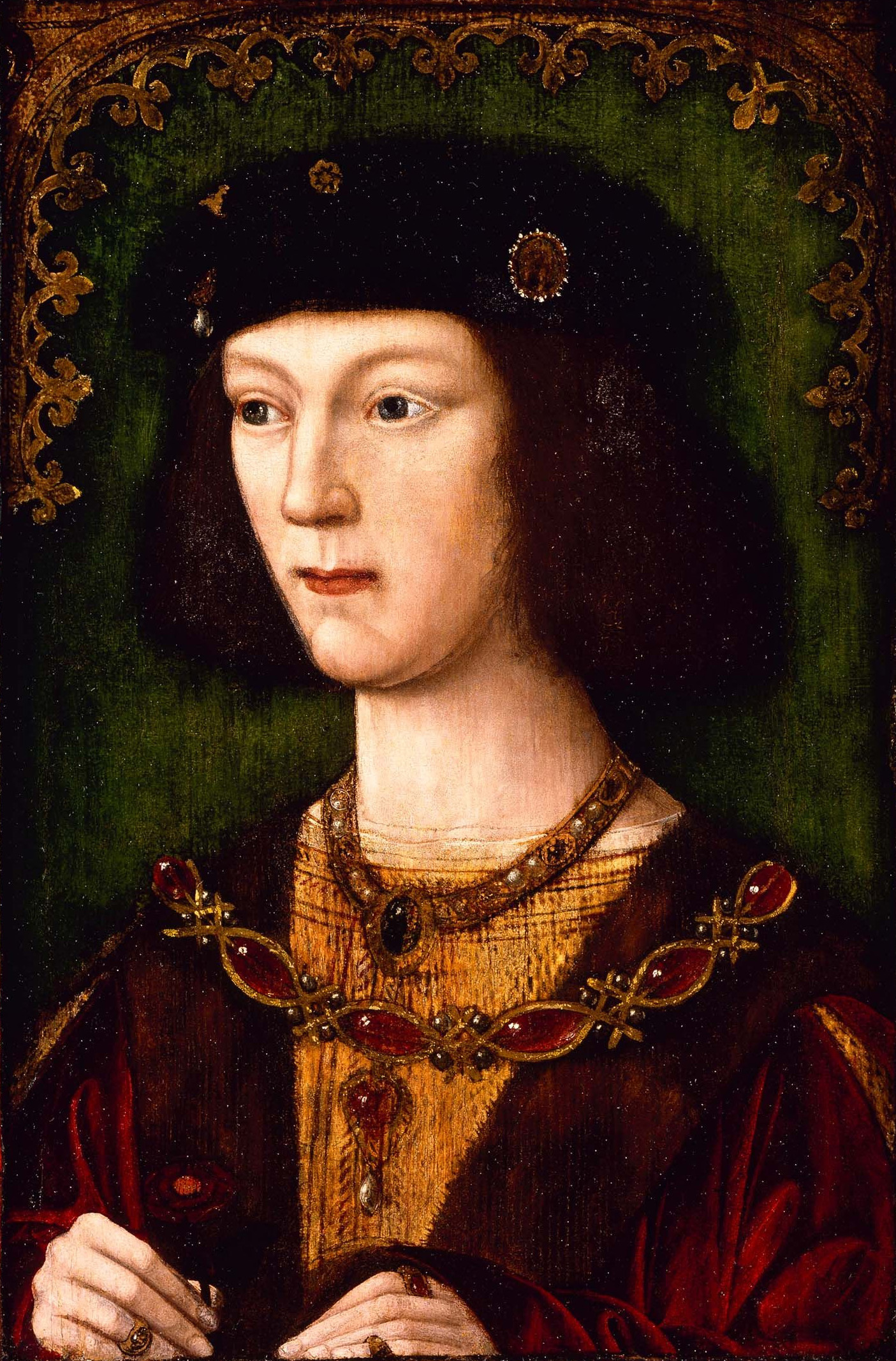
Henry VIII at the time of their marriage, by Meynnart Wewyck, c. 1509

On 11 June 1513, Henry appointed Catherine Regent in England with the titles "Governor of the Realm and Captain General", while he went to France on a military campaign. When Louis d'Orléans, Duke of Longueville, was captured at Thérouanne, Henry sent him to stay in Catherine's household. She wrote to Wolsey that she and her council would prefer the Duke to stay in the Tower of London as the Scots were "so busy as they now be" and she added her prayers for "God to sende us as good lukke against the Scotts, as the King hath ther." The war with Scotland occupied her subjects, and she was "horrible busy with making standards, banners, and badges" at Richmond Palace. Catherine wrote to towns, including Gloucester, asking them to send muster lists of men able to serve as soldiers. The Scots invaded and on 3 September 1513, she ordered Thomas Lovell to raise an army in the midland counties.

Catherine was issued with banners at Richmond on 8 September, and rode north in full armour to address the troops, despite being heavily pregnant at the time. Her fine speech was reported to the historian Peter Martyr d'Anghiera in Valladolid within a fortnight. Although an Italian newsletter said she was 100 miles (160 km) north of London when news of the victory at Battle of Flodden Field reached her, she was near Buckingham. From Woburn Abbey, she sent a letter to Henry along with a piece of the bloodied coat of King James IV of Scotland, who died in the battle, for Henry to use as a banner at the siege of Tournai.

Catherine's religious dedication increased as she became older, as did her interest in academics. She continued to broaden her knowledge and provide training for her daughter, Mary. Education among women became fashionable, partly because of Catherine's influence, and she donated large sums of money to several colleges. Henry, however, still considered a male heir essential. The Tudor dynasty was new, and its legitimacy might still be tested.

In 1520, Catherine's nephew, the Holy Roman Emperor Charles V, paid a state visit to England, and she urged Henry to enter an alliance with Charles rather than with France. Immediately after his departure, she accompanied Henry to France on the celebrated visit to Francis I, the Field of the Cloth of Gold. Within two years, war was declared against France and the Emperor was once again welcome in England, where plans were afoot to betroth him to Catherine's daughter Mary.

=== Pregnancies and children ===
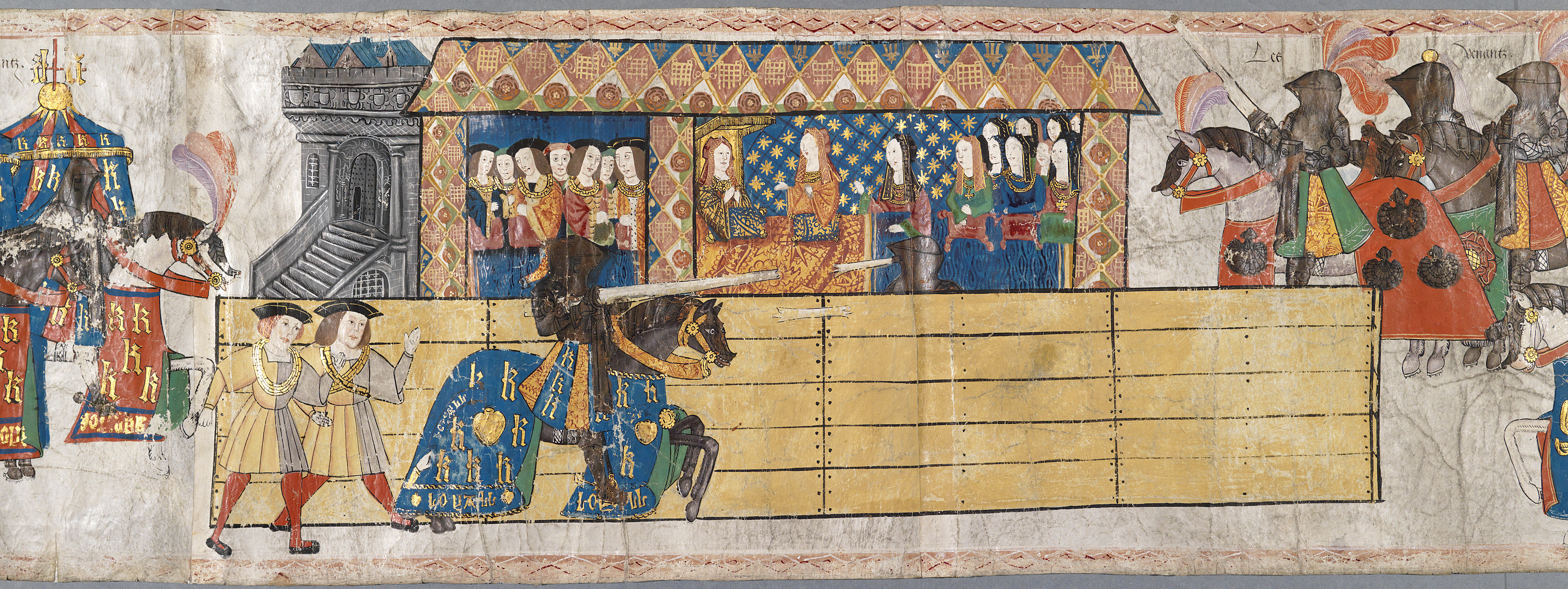
Catherine watching Henry jousting in her honour after giving birth to a son, by Thomas Wriothesley, 1511. Henry's horse mantle is emblazoned with Catherine's initial letter, 'K'.

Name	Birth	Death	Details
Daughter	31 January 1510		Miscarried at approximately six months gestation. Catherine was told she was carrying twins and that the other still lived, so the loss was kept secret as she prepared for the birth. No child came.
Henry	1 January 1511	22 February 1511	Died suddenly, with no recorded cause of death.
Son	c.17 September 1513		Either miscarried, stillborn or lived for a few hours.
Son	November/December 1514		Stillborn. Wolsey wrote in a letter on 15 November that Catherine was "to lie in shortly." Two letters in December mention Catherine lost a child.
Mary	18 February 1516	17 November 1558	Became Queen Mary I of England.
Daughter	10 November 1518		Stillborn.

== The King's great matter ==
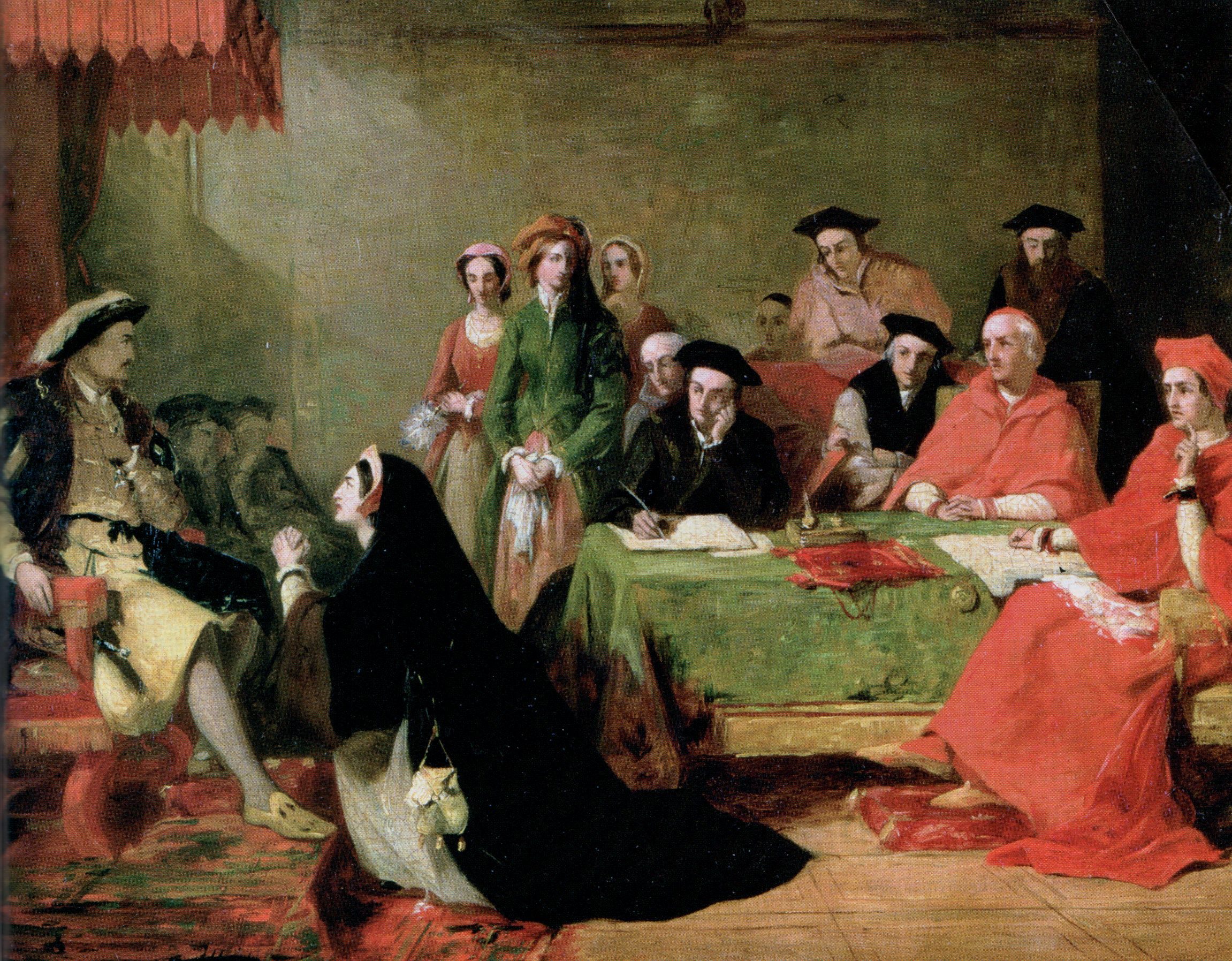
The Trial of Queen Catherine of Aragon, by Henry Nelson O'Neil (1846–1848)

In 1525, Henry VIII became enamoured of Anne Boleyn, a lady-in-waiting to Queen Catherine; Anne was between ten and seventeen years younger than Henry, being born between 1501 and 1507. Henry began pursuing her; Catherine was no longer able to bear children by this time. Henry began to believe that his marriage was cursed and sought confirmation from the Bible, which he interpreted to say that if a man marries his brother's wife, the couple will be childless. Even if her marriage to Arthur had not been consummated (and Catherine would insist to her dying day that she had come to Henry's bed a virgin), Henry's interpretation of that biblical passage meant that their marriage had been wrong in the eyes of God. Whether the pope at the time of Henry and Catherine's marriage had the right to overrule Henry's claimed scriptural impediment would become a hot topic in Henry's campaign to wrest an annulment from the present Pope. It is possible that the idea of annulment had been suggested to Henry much earlier than this, and is highly probable that it was motivated by his desire for a son. Before Henry's father ascended the throne, England was beset by civil warfare over rival claims to the English crown, and Henry may have wanted to avoid a similar uncertainty over the succession.

It soon became the one absorbing object of Henry's desires to secure an annulment. Catherine was defiant when it was suggested that she quietly retire to a nunnery, saying: "God never called me to a nunnery. I am the King's true and legitimate wife." He set his hopes upon an appeal to the Holy See, acting independently of Cardinal Thomas Wolsey, whom he told nothing of his plans. William Knight, the King's secretary, was sent to Pope Clement VII to sue for an annulment, on the grounds that the dispensing bull of Pope Julius II was obtained by false pretenses.

As the pope was, at that time, the prisoner of Catherine's nephew Charles V, Holy Roman Emperor following the Sack of Rome in May 1527, Knight had difficulty in obtaining access to him. In the end, Henry's envoy had to return without accomplishing much. Henry now had no choice but to put this great matter into the hands of Wolsey, who did all he could to secure a decision in Henry's favour.

Both the Pope and Martin Luther raised the possibility that Henry have two wives, not to re-introduce polygamy generally, but "to preserve the royal dignity of Catherine and Mary".

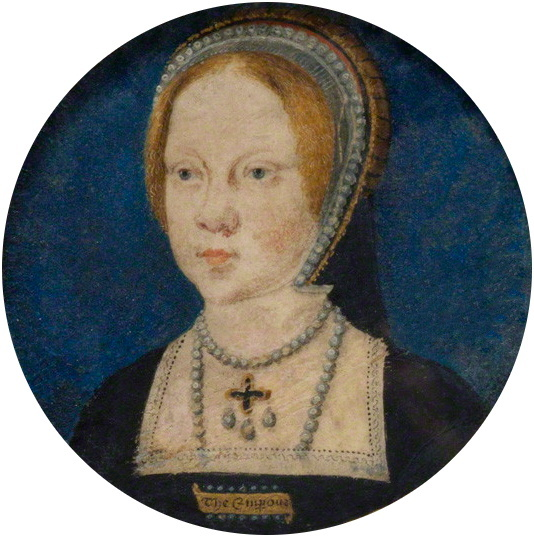
Miniature of Princess Mary at the time of her engagement to Charles V, Holy Roman Emperor, by Lucas Horenbout, c. 1521–1525. She is wearing a rectangular brooch inscribed with "The Emperour".

Wolsey went so far as to convene an ecclesiastical court in England with a representative of the Pope presiding, and Henry and Catherine herself in attendance. The Pope had no intention of allowing a decision to be reached in England, and his legate was recalled. (How far the Pope was influenced by Charles V is difficult to say, but it is clear Henry saw that the Pope was unlikely to annul his marriage to the Emperor's aunt.) The Pope forbade Henry to marry again before a decision was given in Rome. Wolsey had failed and was dismissed from public office in 1529. Wolsey then began a secret plot to have Anne Boleyn forced into exile and began communicating with the Pope to that end. When this was discovered, Henry ordered Wolsey's arrest and, had he not been terminally ill and died in 1530, he might have been executed for treason.

A year later, Catherine was banished from court, and her old rooms were given to Anne Boleyn. Catherine wrote in a letter to Charles V in 1531:

My tribulations are so great, my life so disturbed by the plans daily invented to further the King's wicked intention, the surprises which the King gives me, with certain persons of his council, are so mortal, and my treatment is what God knows, that it is enough to shorten ten lives, much more mine.

When Archbishop of Canterbury William Warham died, the Boleyn family's chaplain, Thomas Cranmer, was appointed to the vacant position.

When Henry decided to annul his marriage to Catherine, John Fisher became her most trusted counsellor and one of her chief supporters. He appeared in the legates' court on her behalf, where he shocked people with the directness of his language, and by declaring that, like John the Baptist, he was ready to die on behalf of the indissolubility of marriage. Henry was so enraged by this that he wrote a long Latin address to the legates in answer to Fisher's speech. Fisher's copy of this still exists, with his manuscript annotations in the margin which show how little he feared Henry's anger. The removal of the cause to Rome ended Fisher's role in the matter, but Henry never forgave him. Other people who supported Catherine's case included Thomas More; Henry's own sister Mary Tudor, Duchess of Suffolk; María de Salinas; Holy Roman Emperor Charles V; Pope Paul III; and Protestant Reformers Martin Luther and William Tyndale.

Family tree of the wives of Henry VIII

King Henry VIII, both of his parents, and all six of his wives were related through a common ancestor, King Edward I of England. See also: Mistresses of Henry VIII

Edward I 1239–1307; King of England
Margaret b. 1275; Duchess of Brabant	Elizabeth of Rhuddlan c. 1282–1316; Countess of Hereford	Edward II; 1284–1327; King of England
John III; 1300–1355; Duke of Brabant	William de Bohun; 1312–1360; Earl of Northampton	Edward III; 1312–1377; King of England
Margaret of Brabant; 1323–1380; Countess of Flanders	Lionel of Antwerp; 1338–1368; Duke of Clarence	Edmund of Langley; 1341–1402; Duke of York	John of Gaunt; 1340–1399; Duke of Lancaster
Margaret III; 1350–1405; Countess of Flanders	Elizabeth Fitzalan c. 1350–1385; Countess of Arundel	Philippa; 1355–1382; Countess of Ulster
John; 1371–1419; Duke of Burgundy	Elizabeth Fitzalan; 1366–1425; Duchess of Norfolk	Elizabeth Mortimer; 1371–1417	Roger Mortimer; 1374–1398; Earl of March	John Beaufort c. 1371–1410; Earl of Somerset	Catherine; 1373–1418; Queen of Castile	Joan Beaufort c. 1379–1440; Countess of Westmorland
Mary; 1393–1466; Duchess of Cleves	Margaret de Mowbray b. 1388	Elizabeth c. 1395–1436; Baroness de Clifford	Anne de Mortimer; 1388–c. 1411	Richard of Conisburgh; 1385–1415; Earl of Cambridge	John Beaufort; 1404–1444; Duke of Somerset	John II; 1405–1454; King of Castile	Richard Neville; 1400–1460; Earl of Salisbury
John I 1419–1481; Duke of Cleves	John Howard c. 1425–1485; Duke of Norfolk	Mary Clifford	Richard; 1411–1460; Duke of York	Alice Neville b. c. 1430; Baroness FitzHugh
John II; 1458–1521; Duke of Cleves	Thomas Howard; 1443–1524; Duke of Norfolk	Henry Wentworth c. 1448–1499/1501	Edward IV; 1442–1483; King of England	Margaret Beaufort; 1441/43–1509	Isabella I 1451–1504; Queen of Castile	Elizabeth FitzHugh c. 1455/1465–bef. 1507
John III; 1490–1538/1539; Duke of Cleves	Edmund Howard c. 1478–1539	Elizabeth Boleyn c. 1480–1538; Countess of Wiltshire	Margery Wentworth c. 1478–1550	Elizabeth of York; 1466–1503	Henry VII; 1457–1509; King of England	Thomas Parr c. 1483–1517
Anne of Cleves; 1515–1557; 4th wife: 1540	Catherine Howard c. 1524–1542; 5th wife: 1540–1542	Anne Boleyn c. 1507–1536; 2nd wife: 1533–1536	Jane Seymour c. 1508–1537; 3rd wife: 1536–1537	Henry VIII; 1491–1547; King of England	Catherine of Aragon; 1485–1536; 1st wife: 1509–1533	Catherine Parr; 1512–1548; 6th wife: 1543–1547
Elizabeth I 1533–1603; Queen of England	Edward VI; 1537–1553; King of England	Mary I 1516–1558; Queen of England

== Banishment and death ==
Six wives of Henry VIII
and years of marriage

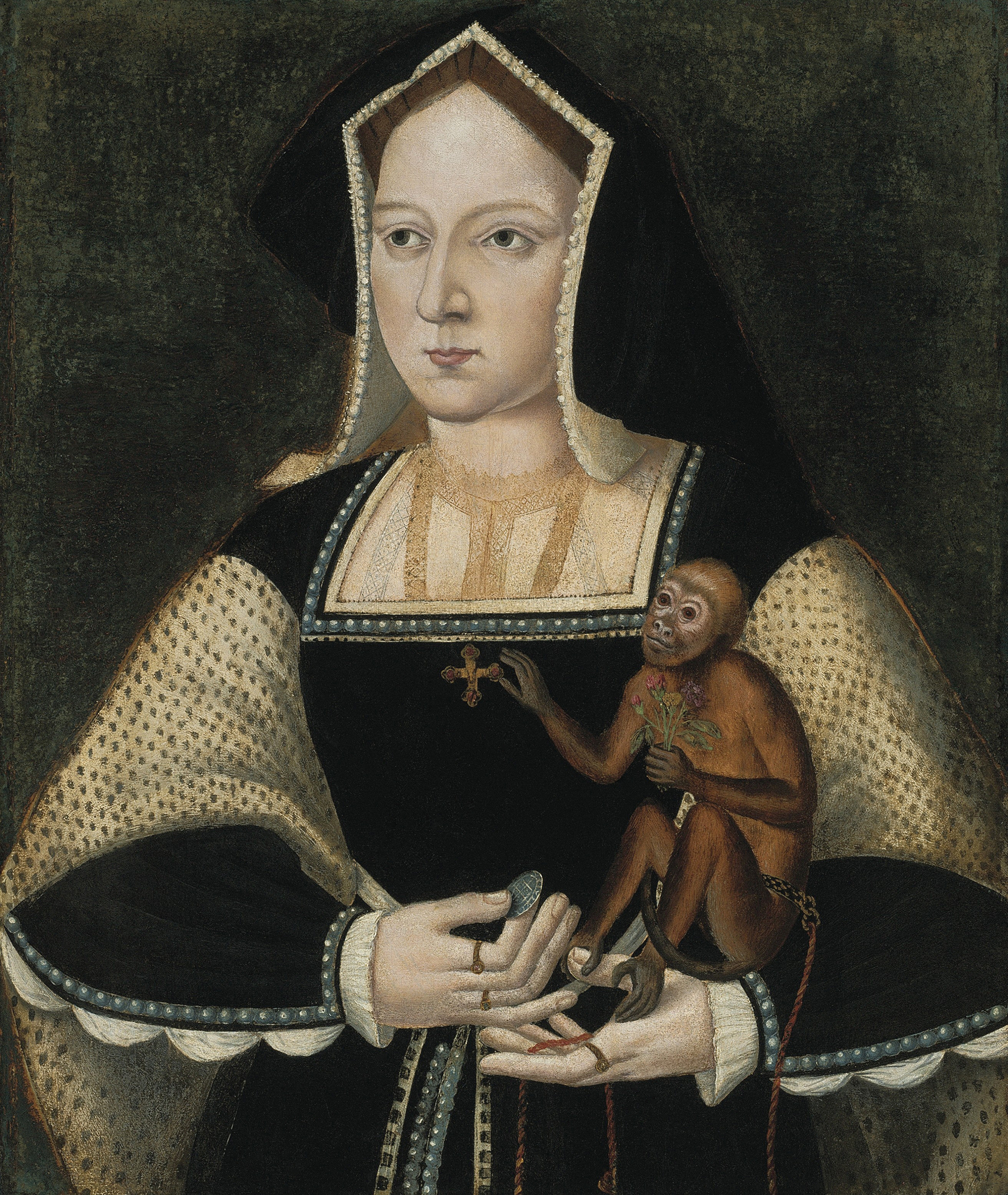
Catherine of Aragon
m. 1509–1533

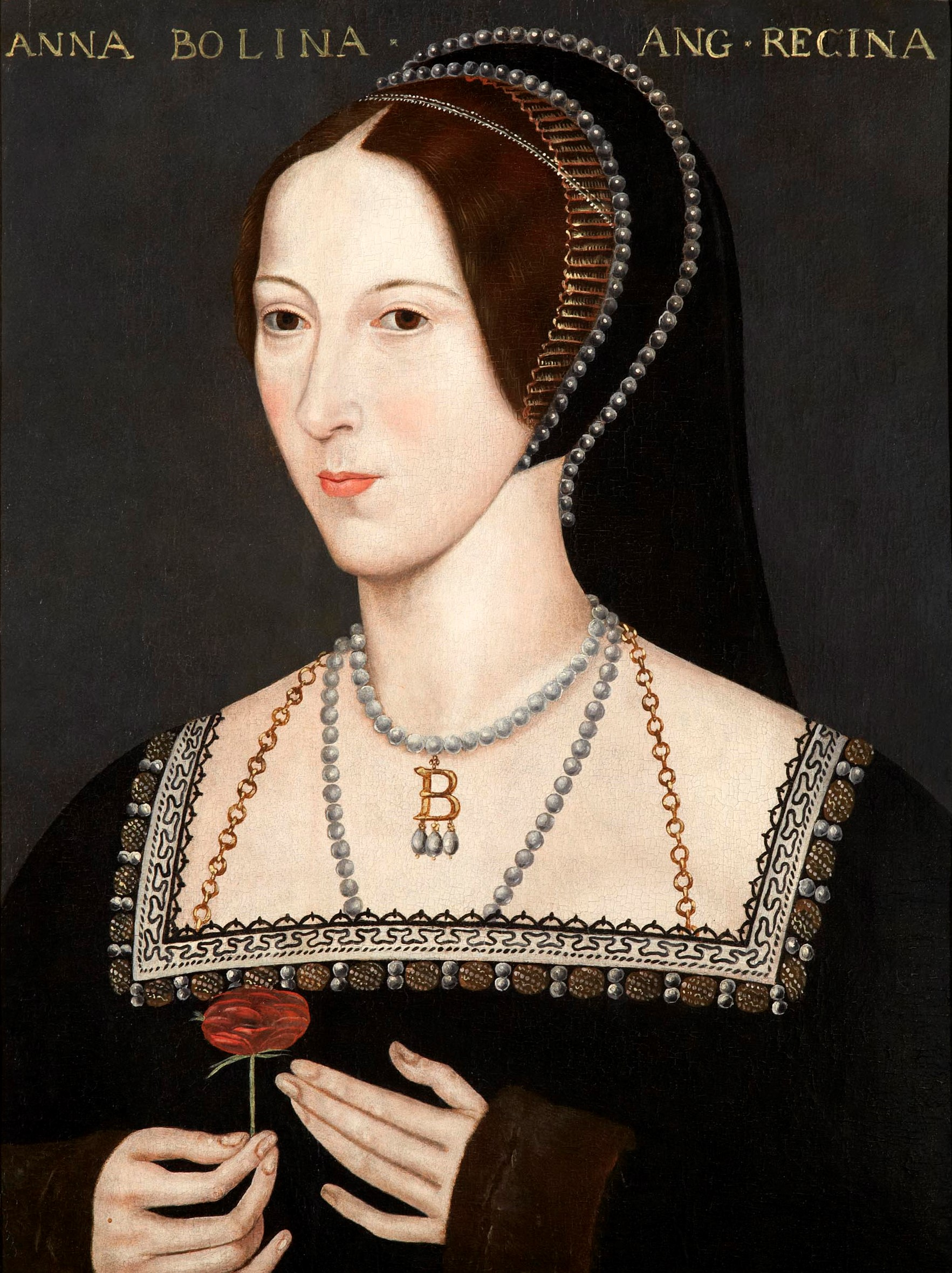
Anne Boleyn
m. 1532/1533–1536

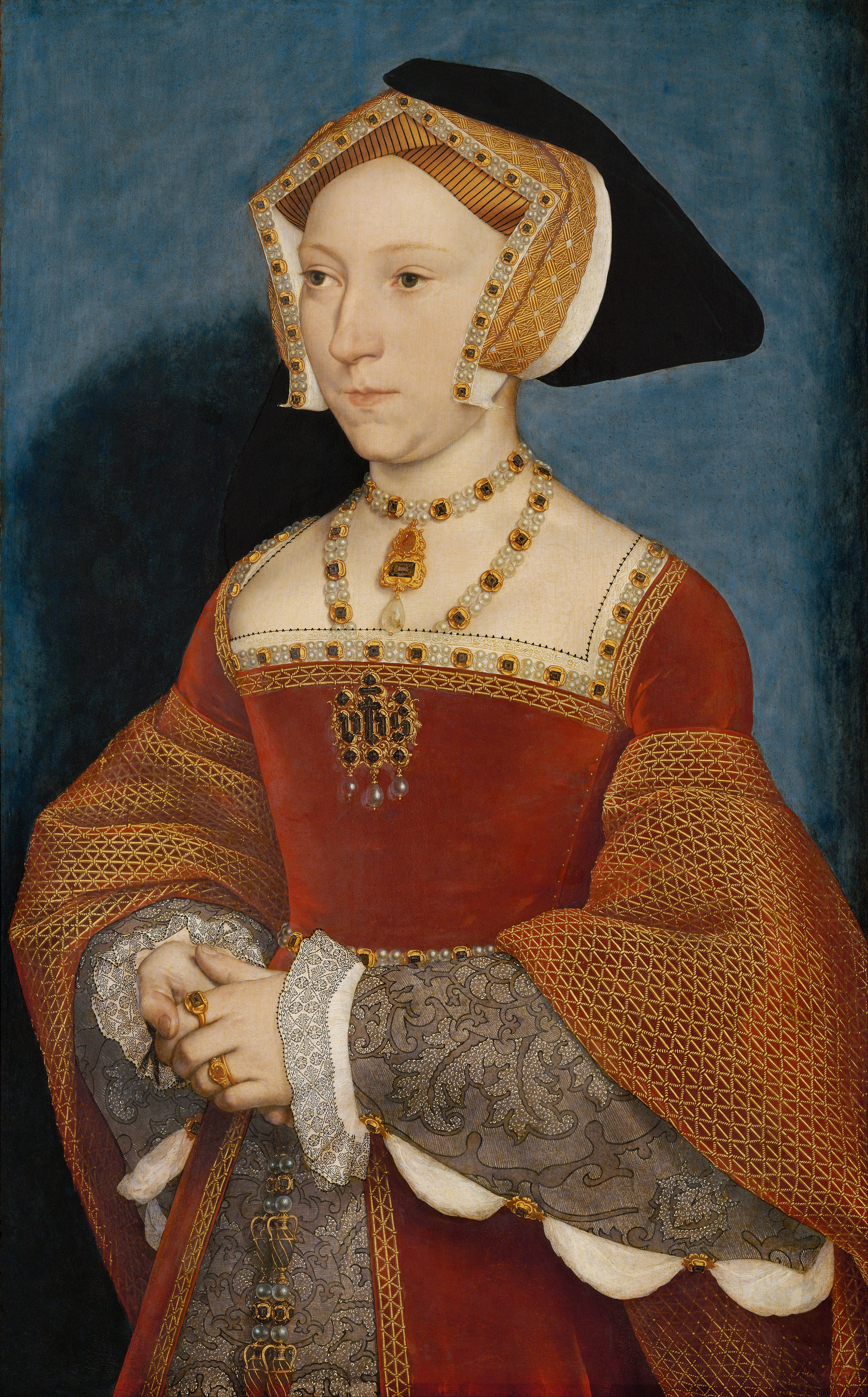
Jane Seymour
m. 1536–1537

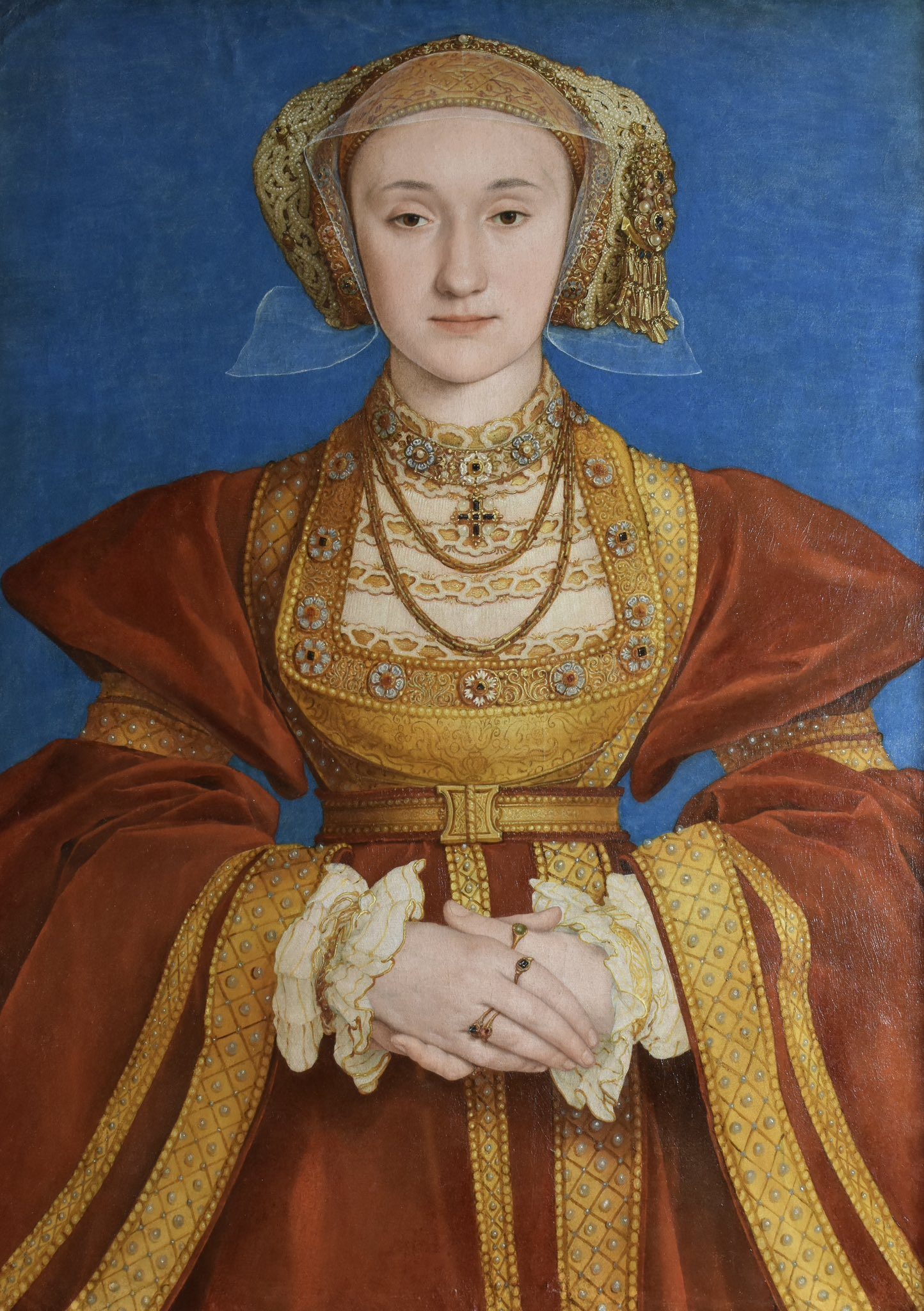
Anne of Cleves
m. 1540

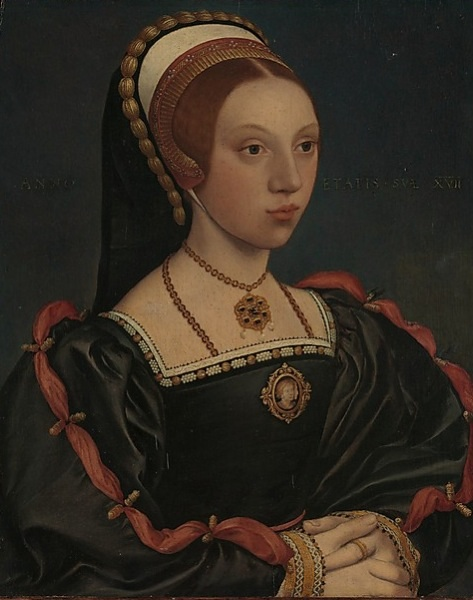
Catherine Howard
m. 1540–1542

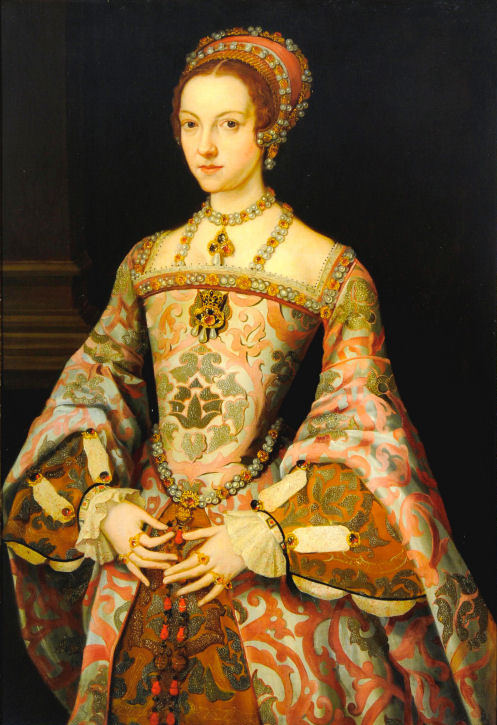
Catherine Parr
m. 1543–1547

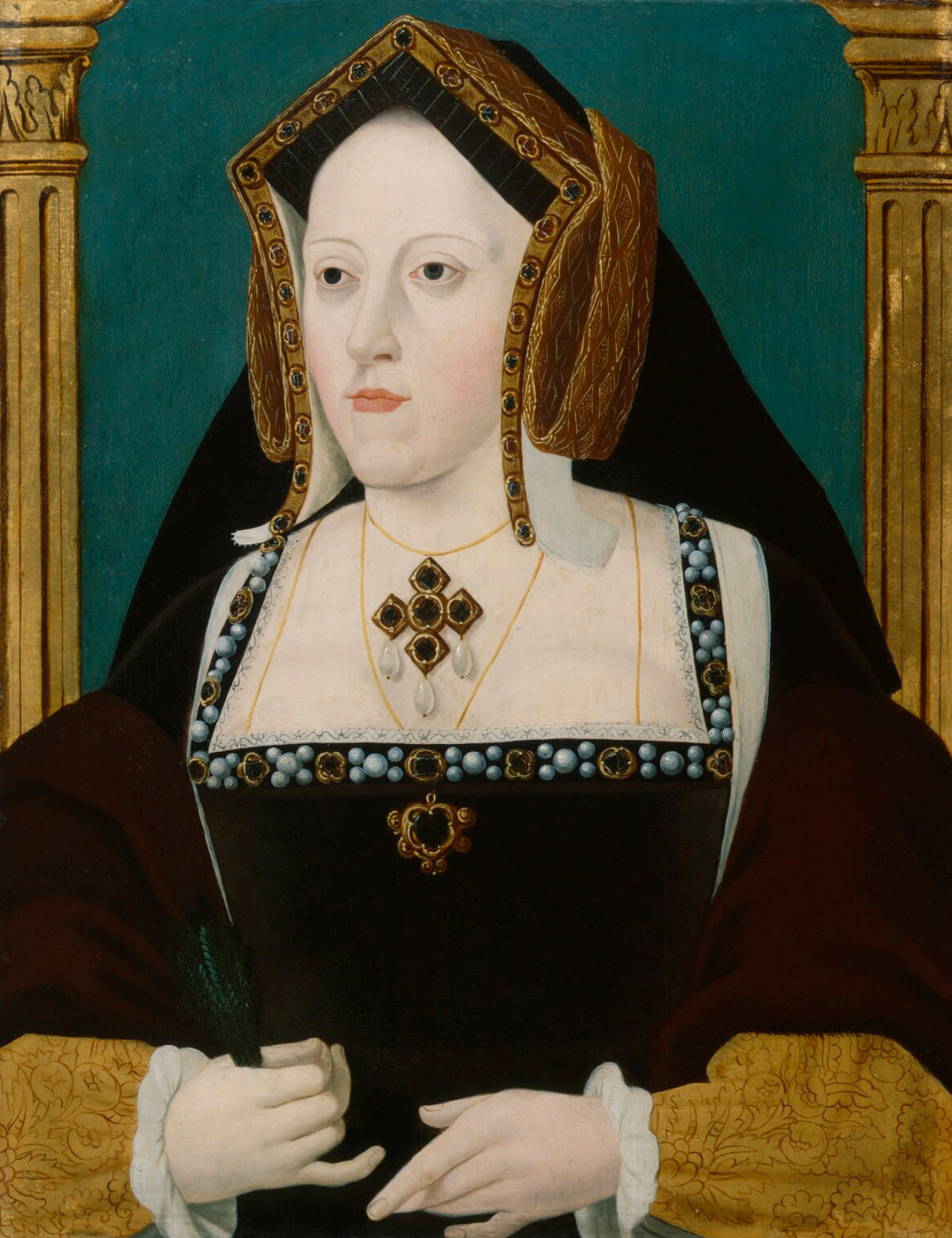
Catherine of Aragon, attributed to Joannes Corvus

Upon returning to Dover from a meeting with King Francis I of France in Calais, Henry VIII married Anne Boleyn in a secret ceremony in 1532. Some sources speculate that Anne was already pregnant at the time and that Henry did not want to risk a son being born illegitimate. Others testify that Anne, who had seen her sister Mary Boleyn previously taken up as the King's mistress and summarily cast aside, refused to sleep with Henry until they were married. Henry defended the lawfulness of their union by pointing out that Catherine had previously been married. If she and Arthur had consummated their marriage, Henry by canon law had the right to remarry. On 23 May 1533, Thomas Cranmer, sitting in judgement at a special court convened at Dunstable Priory to rule on the validity of Henry's marriage to Catherine, declared the marriage unlawful, even though Catherine had testified that she and Arthur had never had physical relations. Five days later, on 28 May 1533, Cranmer ruled that Henry and Anne's marriage was valid.

Until the end of her life, Catherine would refer to herself as Henry's only lawful wedded wife and England's only rightful queen, and her servants continued to address her as such. Henry refused her the right to any title but "Dowager Princess of Wales" in recognition of her position as his brother's widow.

Catherine went to live at The More Castle, Hertfordshire, late in 1531. After that, she was successively moved to the Royal Palace of Hatfield, Hertfordshire (May to September 1532), Elsyng Palace, Enfield (September 1532 to February 1533), Ampthill Castle, Bedfordshire (February to July 1533) and Buckden Towers, Cambridgeshire (July 1533 to May 1534). She was then finally transferred to Kimbolton Castle, Cambridgeshire, where she confined herself to one room, which she left only to attend Mass, dressed only in the hair shirt of the Franciscans, and fasted continuously. While she was permitted to receive occasional visitors, she was forbidden to see her daughter Mary. They were also forbidden to communicate in writing, but sympathisers discreetly conveyed letters between the two. Henry offered both mother and daughter better quarters and permission to see each other if they would acknowledge Anne Boleyn as the new queen; both refused.

In late December 1535, sensing her death was near, Catherine made her will, and wrote to her nephew, the Emperor Charles V, asking him to protect her daughter. It has been claimed that she then penned one final letter to Henry:

My most dear lord, king and husband,

The hour of my death now drawing on, the tender love I owe you forceth me, my case being such, to commend myself to you, and to put you in remembrance with a few words of the health and safeguard of your soul which you ought to prefer before all worldly matters, and before the care and pampering of your body, for the which you have cast me into many calamities and yourself into many troubles. For my part, I pardon you everything, and I wish to devoutly pray God that He will pardon you also. For the rest, I commend unto you our daughter Mary, beseeching you to be a good father unto her, as I have heretofore desired. I entreat you also, on behalf of my maids, to give them marriage portions, which is not much, they being but three. For all my other servants I solicit the wages due them, and a year more, lest they be unprovided for. Lastly, I make this vow, that mine eyes desire you above all things.
Katharine the Quene.

The authenticity of the letter itself has been questioned, but not Catherine's attitude in its wording, which has been reported with variations in different sources.

Catherine died at Kimbolton Castle on 7 January 1536. The following day, news of her death reached the King. At the time there were rumours that she was poisoned, possibly by Gregory di Casale. According to the chronicler Edward Hall, Anne Boleyn wore yellow for the mourning, which has been interpreted in various ways; Polydore Vergil interpreted this to mean that Anne did not mourn. Chapuys reported that it was King Henry who decked himself in yellow, celebrating the news and making a great show of his and Anne's daughter, Elizabeth, to his courtiers. This was seen as distasteful and vulgar by many. Another theory is that the dressing in yellow was out of respect for Catherine as yellow was said to be the Spanish colour of mourning. It is reported that Henry and Anne both individually and privately wept for her death later in the day.

On the day of Catherine's funeral, Anne miscarried a male child. Rumours then circulated that Catherine had been poisoned by Anne or Henry, or both. The rumours were born after the apparent discovery during her embalming that there was a black growth on her heart that might have been caused by poisoning. Modern medical experts are in agreement that her heart's discolouration was due not to poisoning, but to cancer, something which was not understood at the time. Catherine was buried in Peterborough Cathedral with the ceremony due to her position as a Dowager Princess of Wales, and not a queen. Henry did not attend the funeral and forbade Mary to attend.

== Faith ==
Catherine was a member of the Third Order of Saint Francis and she was punctilious in her religious obligations in the order, integrating without demur her necessary duties as queen with her personal piety. After the annulment, she was quoted "I would rather be a poor beggar's wife and be sure of heaven, than queen of all the world and stand in doubt thereof by reason of my own consent."

The outward celebration of saints and holy relics formed no major part of her personal devotions, which she rather expressed in the Mass, prayer, Confession and penance. She also privately lamented the weakness of Pope Clement VII and the corruption of Catholic Church officials.

== Appearance ==
In her youth, Catherine was described as "the most beautiful creature in the world" and that there was "nothing lacking in her that the most beautiful girl should have". Thomas More and Lord Herbert would reflect later in her lifetime that in regard to her appearance "there were few women who could compete with the Queen [Catherine] in her prime."

== Legacy, memory and historiography ==
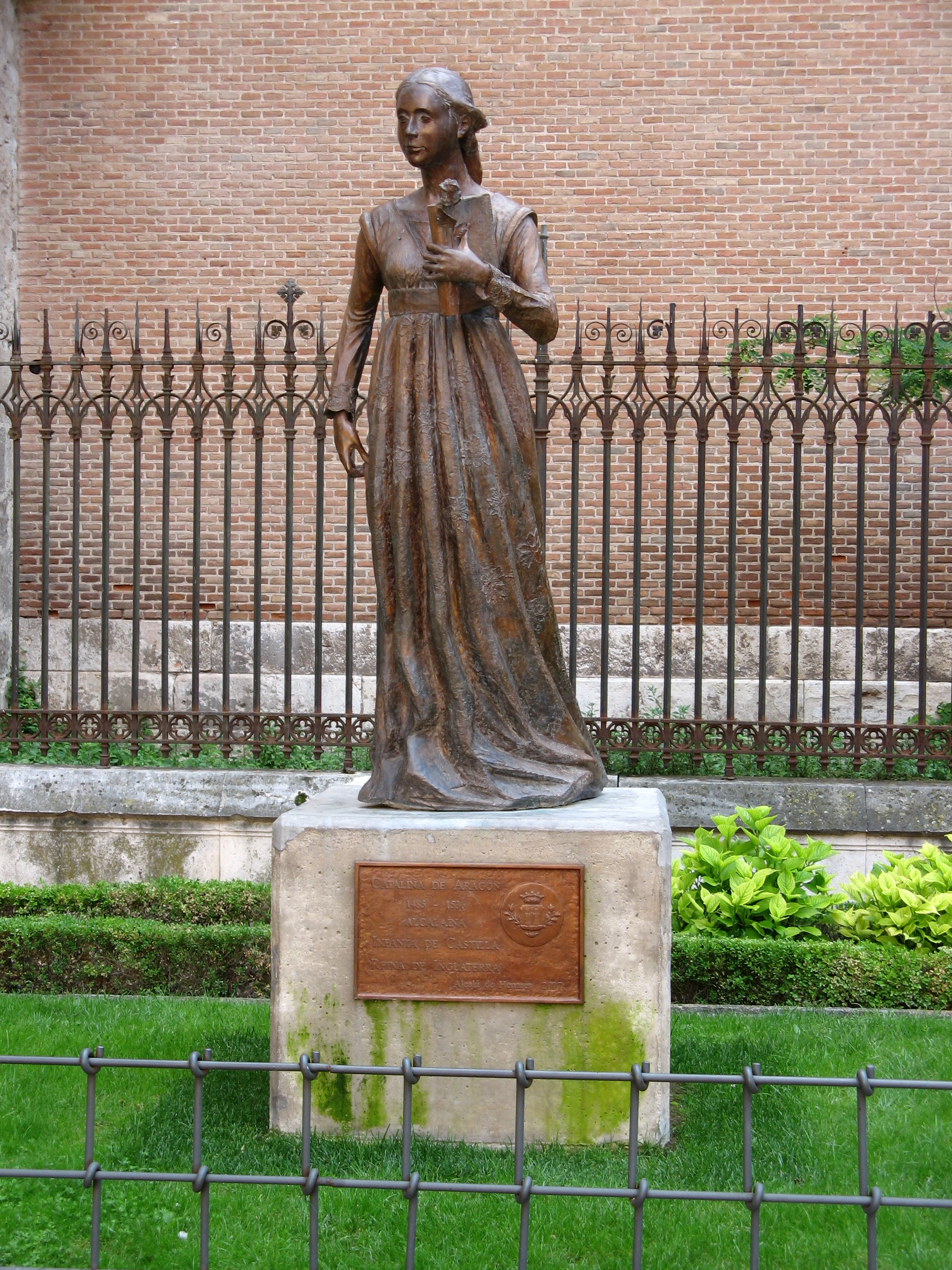
Statue of Catherine at Alcalá de Henares

The controversial book The Education of a Christian Woman by Juan Luis Vives, which claimed women have the right to an education, was dedicated to and commissioned by her. Such was Catherine's impression on people, that even her enemy, Thomas Cromwell, said of her "If not for her sex, she could have defied all the heroes of History." She successfully appealed for the lives of the rebels involved in the Evil May Day for the sake of their families. Furthermore, Catherine won widespread admiration by starting an extensive programme for the relief of the poor. She was also a patron of Renaissance humanism, and a friend of the great scholars Erasmus of Rotterdam and Saint Thomas More. Some saw her as a martyr.

In the reign of her daughter Mary I, her marriage to Henry VIII was confirmed to be lawful and its annulment from 1533 was reversed by parliament in 1553. Queen Mary also had several portraits commissioned of Catherine, and it would not by any means be the last time she was painted. After her death, numerous portraits were painted of her, particularly of her speech at the Legatine Trial, a moment accurately rendered in Shakespeare's play about Henry VIII.

Her tomb in Peterborough Cathedral can be seen and there is hardly ever a time when it is not decorated with flowers or pomegranates, her heraldic symbol. It bears the title Katharine Queen of England.

In the 20th century, George V's wife, Mary of Teck, gave her grave an upgrade and added banners there denoting Catherine as a Queen of England. Every year at Peterborough Cathedral a service is held in her memory. There are processions, prayers and various events in the Cathedral including processions to Catherine's grave in which candles, pomegranates, flowers and other offerings are placed on her grave. The Spanish Ambassador to the United Kingdom attended the commemoration of the 470th anniversary of her death. During the 2010 service a rendition of Catherine of Aragon's speech before the Legatine court was read by Jane Lapotaire. There is a statue of her in her birthplace of Alcalá de Henares, as a young woman holding a book and a rose.

Catherine has remained a popular biographical subject to the present day. The American historian Garrett Mattingly was the author of a popular biography Katherine of Aragon in 1942. In 1966, Catherine and her many supporters at court were the subjects of Catherine of Aragon and her Friends, a biography by John E. Paul. In 1967, Mary M. Luke wrote the first book of her Tudor trilogy, Catherine the Queen which portrayed her and the tumultuous era of English history through which she lived.

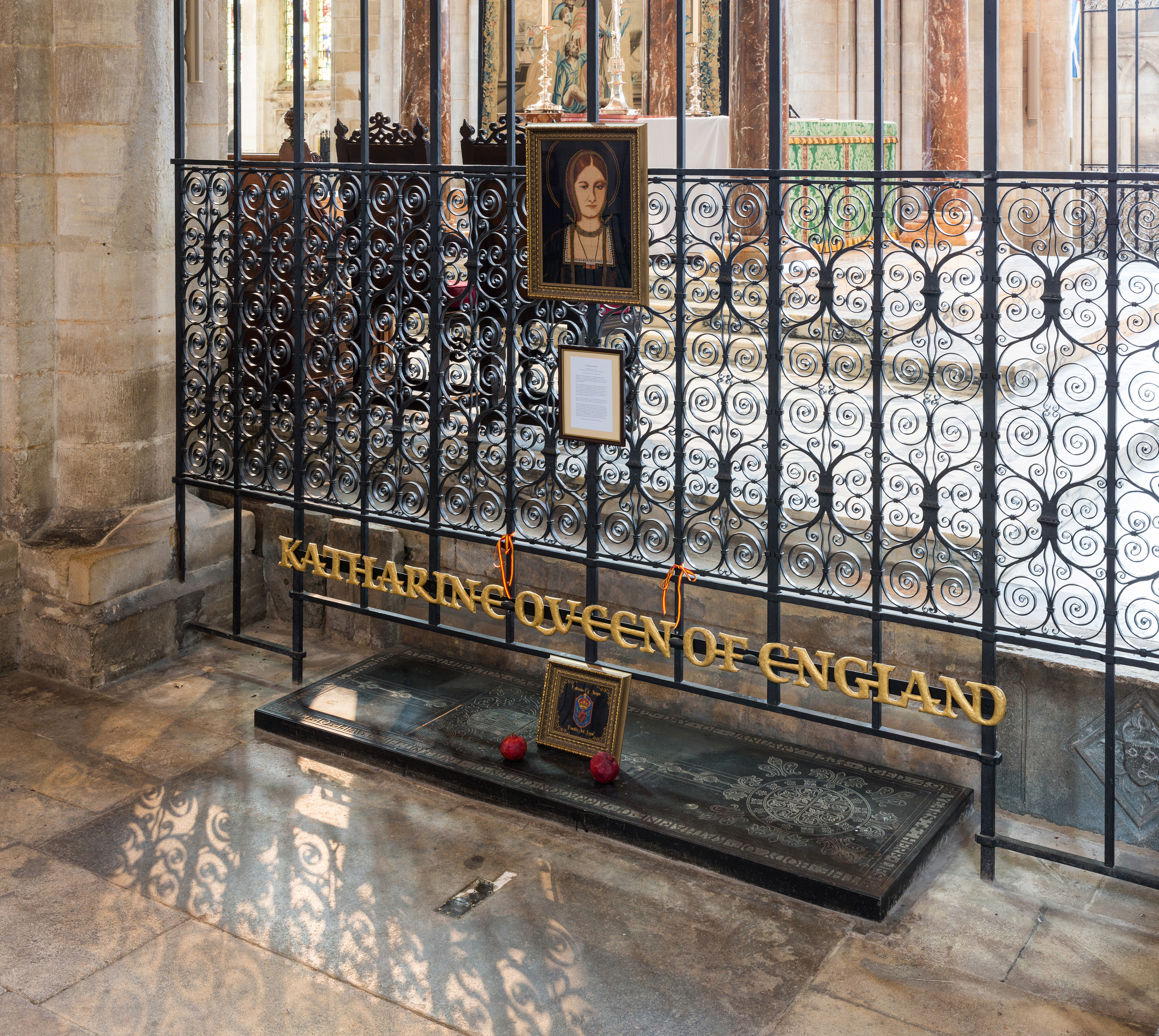
Grave of Catherine of Aragon in Peterborough Cathedral

In recent years, the historian Alison Weir covered her life extensively in her biography The Six Wives of Henry VIII, first published in 1991. Antonia Fraser did the same in her own 1992 biography of the same title; as did the British historian David Starkey in his 2003 book Six Wives: The Queens of Henry VIII. Giles Tremlett's biography, Catherine of Aragon: The Spanish Queen of Henry VIII, came out in 2010, and Julia Fox's dual biography, Sister Queens: The Noble, Tragic Lives of Katherine of Aragon and Juana, Queen of Castile, came out in 2011.

=== Places and statues ===
- In Alcalá de Henares, the place of Catherine's birth, a statue of Catherine as a young woman holding a rose and a book can be seen in the Archbishop's Palace.
- Peterborough is twinned with the Spanish city of Alcalá de Henares, located in the wider Community of Madrid. Children from schools in the two places have learned about each other as part of the twinning venture, and artists have even come over from Alcalá de Henares to paint Catherine's tombstone.
- Many places in Ampthill are named after Catherine. Also in Ampthill there is a cross in Ampthill Great Park, the Katherine cross, erected in her honour in 1776. It is on the site of the castle where she was sent during her divorce from the King.
- Kimbolton School's science and mathematics block is called the QKB, or Queen Katherine Building.

=== Spelling of her name ===
Catherine of Aragon's arms while queen

Her baptismal name was "Catalina", but "Katherine" was soon the accepted form in England after her marriage to Arthur. Catherine herself signed her name "Katherine", "Katherina", "Katharine" and sometimes "Katharina". In a letter to her, Arthur, her husband, addressed her as "Princess Katerine". Her daughter Queen Mary I called her "Quene Kateryn", in her will. Names, particularly first names, were rarely spelt consistently during the sixteenth century, and it is evident from Catherine's own letters that different variations were used. Loveknots built into his various palaces by her husband, Henry VIII, display the initials "H & K", (Note: As Latin inscriptions were used in structures, a "C" represented the numeral 100, so a "K" was used instead. The same was applied during the time of Henry II of France and his wife Catherine de' Medici during her state entry in Paris on 18 June 1549.) as do other items belonging to Henry and Catherine, including gold goblets, a gold salt cellar, basins of gold, and candlesticks. Her tomb in Peterborough Cathedral is marked "Katharine Queen of England".

== See also ==
- Cultural depictions of Catherine of Aragon
- Descendants of Ferdinand II of Aragon and Isabella I of Castile
- List of English royal consorts
- Empress Matilda
- Wars of the Roses

== Notes ==
Catherine of Aragon House of Trastámara Born: 16 December 1485 Died: 7 January 1536
English royalty
Vacant Title last held by Elizabeth of York	Queen consort of England; Lady of Ireland; 1509–1533	Vacant Title next held by Anne Boleyn
Diplomatic posts
Preceded by Rodrigo González de la Puebla	Ambassador of Aragon to England; 1507–1509 with Rodrigo González de la Puebla (1507–1508); Gutierre Gómez de Fuensalida (1508–1509)	Succeeded by
