= Francisco Felipe =

Spanish attendant of Katherine of Aragon

Francisco Felipe was a Spanish attendant of Catherine of Aragon, the first wife of King Henry VIII of England.

He was also one of the contributors to the Spanish Chronicle.
