= List of museums in Melilla =

This is an incomplete list of museums in Melilla, Spain.

- Historical Military Museum of Melilla
- Melilla Museum
