= Trapana Cove =

Beach in Melilla, Spain

- Beach
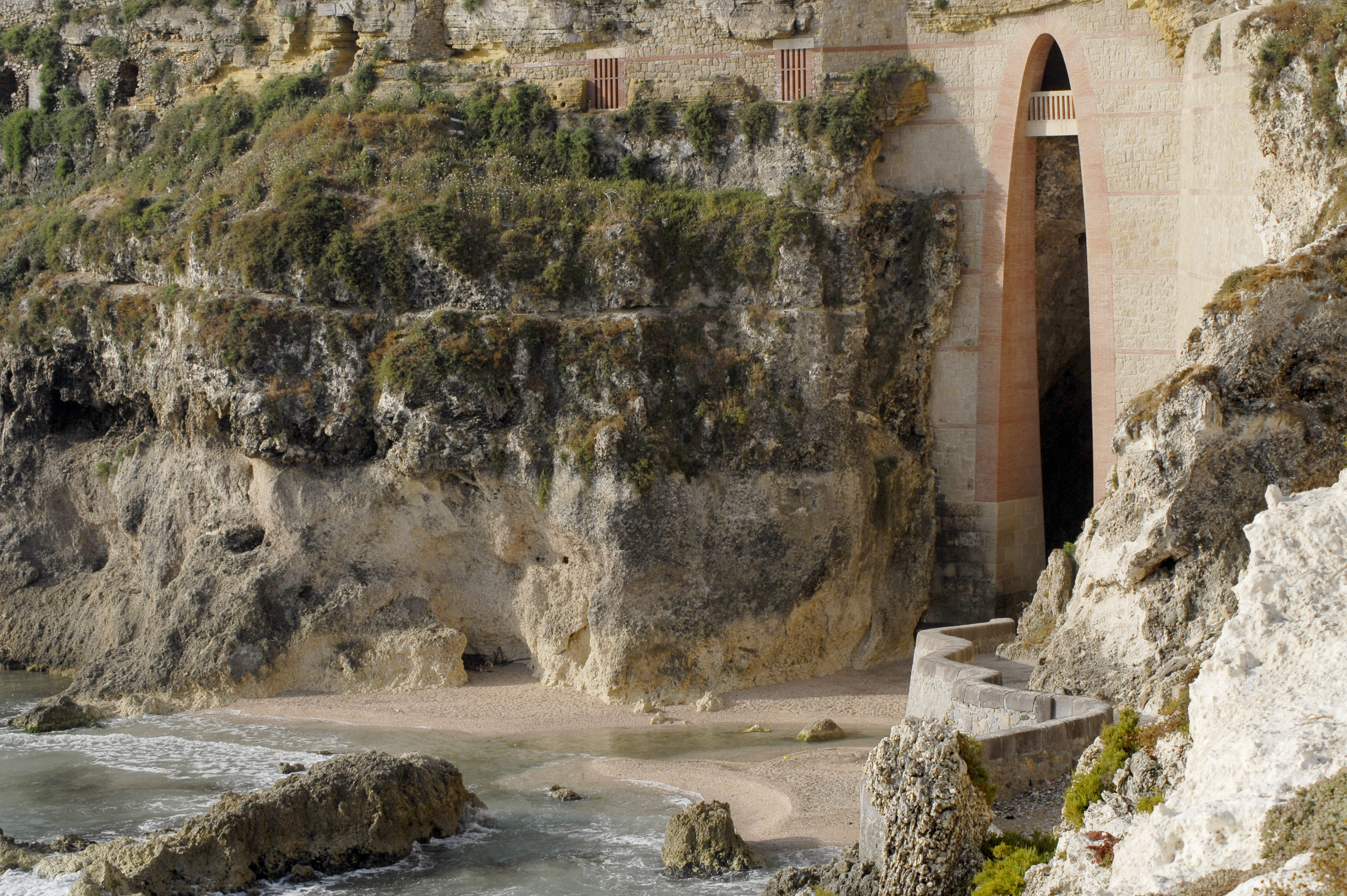
- Interactive map of Trapana Cove
- Coordinates: 35°17′42″N 2°56′00″W
- Location: Melilla, Spain

Trapana Cove (Spanish: Cala de Trápana) is located in Melilla, Spain. The beach is located on Melilla la Vieja.
