= Ataque Seco =

Coordinates: 35°17′49″N 2°56′21″W

Ataque Seco is one of the barrios (neighbourhoods) of the city of Melilla, a Spanish exclave on the north coast of Africa.

Ataque Seco is located in the central north of the city, 500 metres from the Mediterranean coast and one kilometre northwest of Melilla la Vieja, the old walled city. The neighbourhood is bounded in the east by a large park, the Parque Lobera. The city's cemetery is sited immediately to the north of Ataque Seco.
