= Charles V Renaissance Market =

Annual event in Melilla, Spain

Charles V Renaissance Market Mercado Renacentista de Carlos V
- Status: Active
- Genre: Historical reenactment event
- Date: From the end of June to the beginning of July
- Frequency: Annually
- Venue: Melilla la Vieja
- Location: Melilla
- Coordinates: 35°17′37″N 02°56′02″W
- Country: Spain
- Years active: 22
- Inaugurated: June 30, 2004
- Previous event: 2024
- Next event: 2025
- Participants: 45.000 (2010)
- Website: Official web page

Charles V Renaissance Market is a festive event that takes place in the old town of the Spanish town of Melilla, recreating a medieval market for three days. It is held annually, on the first weekend of July.

== History ==
The Medieval Market in Melilla began its first edition in 2004 with the help of the recently created Melilla Ciudad Monumental Foundation.

The narrow streets of Melilla la Vieja appeared with straw spread on the ground in a walled enclosure decorated with the display of banners, craft stalls, theatrical and musical entertainment that were a great success in terms of participation, setting the tone for a mandatory calendar for subsequent editions that were held uninterruptedly until 2019.

Since 2016, the medieval market has been transformed into its new Renaissance Market format with the aim of including Melilla in the Route of Charles V.

In 2024, after a four-year hiatus due to COVID-19, the Government of Melilla resumed the tradition and the market will have four distinct areas: one Christian, one Muslim, one Hebrew, and one Gypsy-Hindu.

== Current events ==
Since 2004, Melilla la Vieja has returned to the past: the streets are decorated with banners, dozens of stalls for craftsmen are set up and activities and performances are organised outdoors, such as medieval tournaments with horse-drawn warrior fights, falconry and archery exhibitions, or representations of historical or legendary events. The influx of public is massive, having sometimes exceeded 45,000 visitors:people are highly involved in the Fair, and many of them dress in period costumes. Thus, on the first weekend of July, kings, knights, maidens, minstrels, craftsmen, peasants and other typical characters of the Middle Ages will meet at the walls of Melilla La Vieja to enjoy the ‘Carlos V Renaissance Market’, a tradition.
