= Historical Military Museum of Melilla =

- Museo Histórico Militar de Melilla
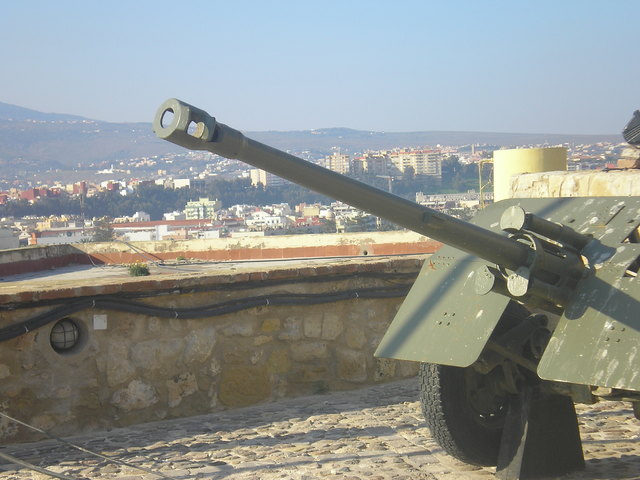
- Established: 18th century
- Location: Melilla,Spain
- Coordinates: 35°17′36″N 02°56′02″W
- Type: Museum of Military History
- Collections: 600 works -section History- 500 pieces
- Visitors: 11 000(2012)
- Director: Amadeo Flores Mateos
- Owner: Spanish Army
- Website: Historical Military Museum of Melilla

Military Museum of Melilla is a museum in the Spanish city of Melilla. It is located in the Baluarte de la Concepción Alta, in the First Fortified Enclosure of Melilla la Vieja.

== History ==
As part of the celebration of the 500th anniversary of Melilla, an exhibition on military history was held, with funds from the Army Museum, which once finished remained in Melilla, and with other funds donated by the Autonomous City, as well as others from private individuals, this museum was formed, being inaugurated on July 15, 1997.

== Description ==
In the gunpowder store, in the ground room there is the permanent exhibition, where military uniforms, models, dioramas, all kinds of weapons are displayed, highlighting an Enigma machine, and a saddle of Isabella II, and in the upper room there are the temporary exhibitions, with cannons and mortars located on the artillery platforms.

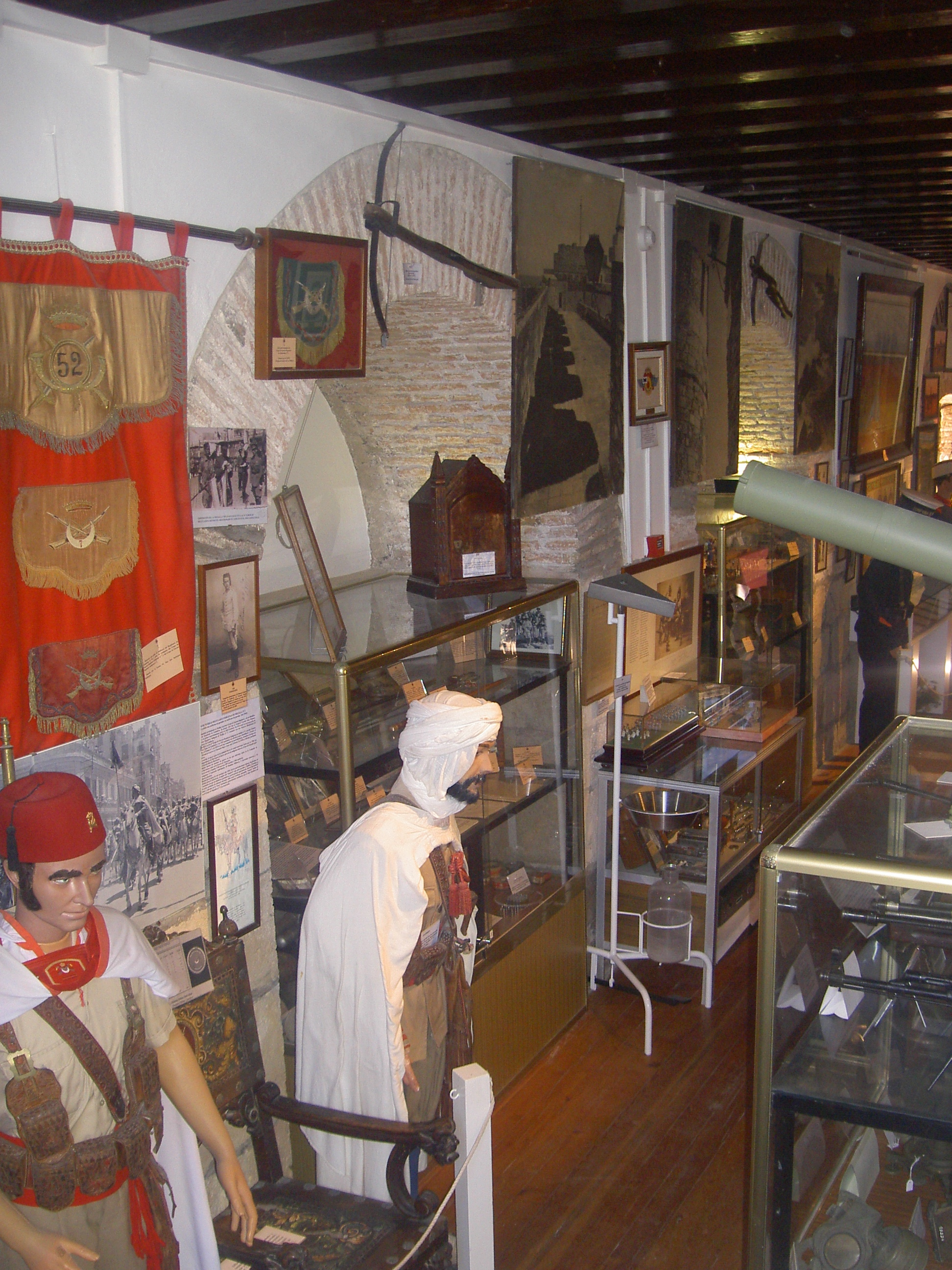

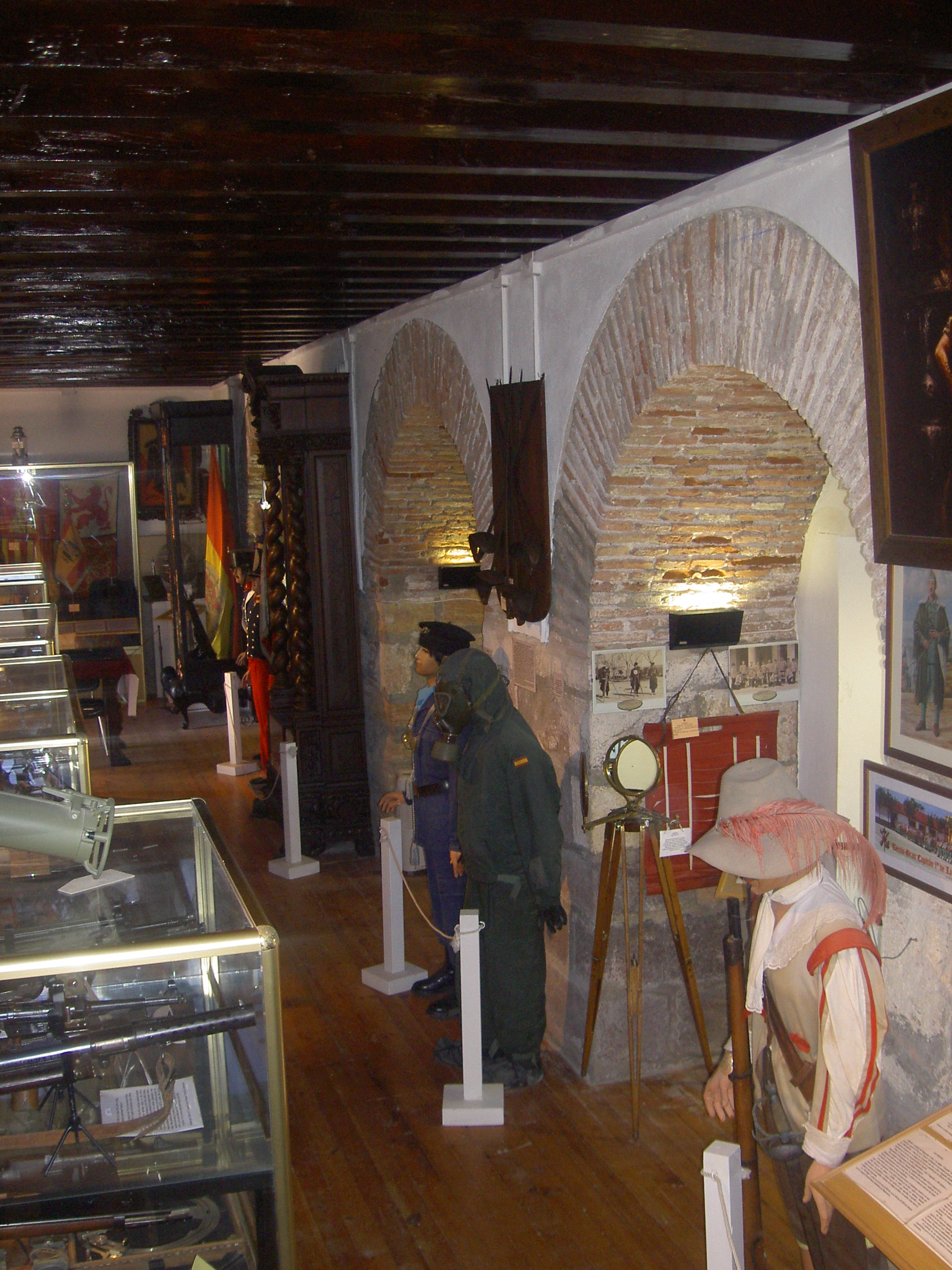

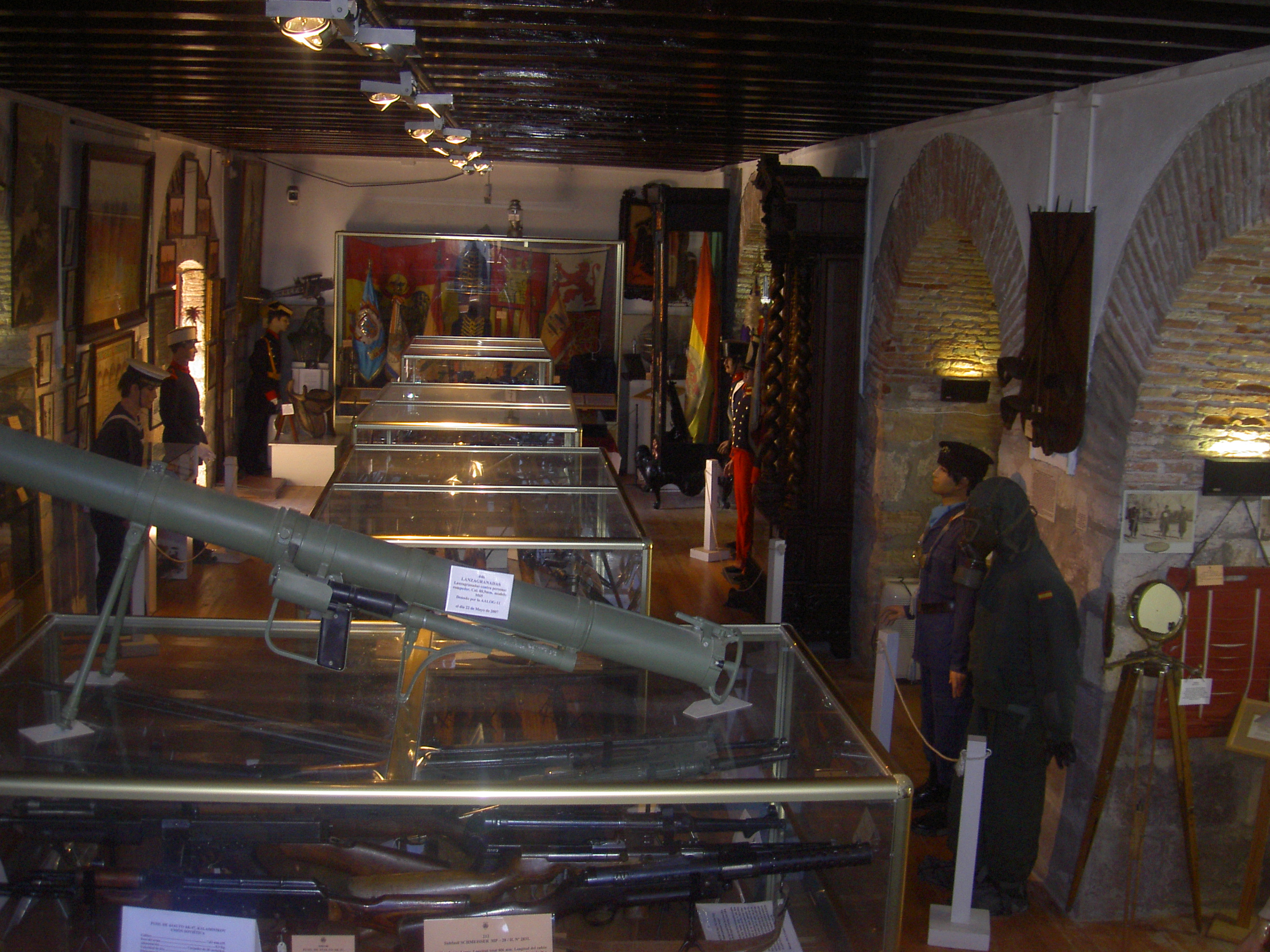
