= Conventico Caves =

- Cuevas del Conventico
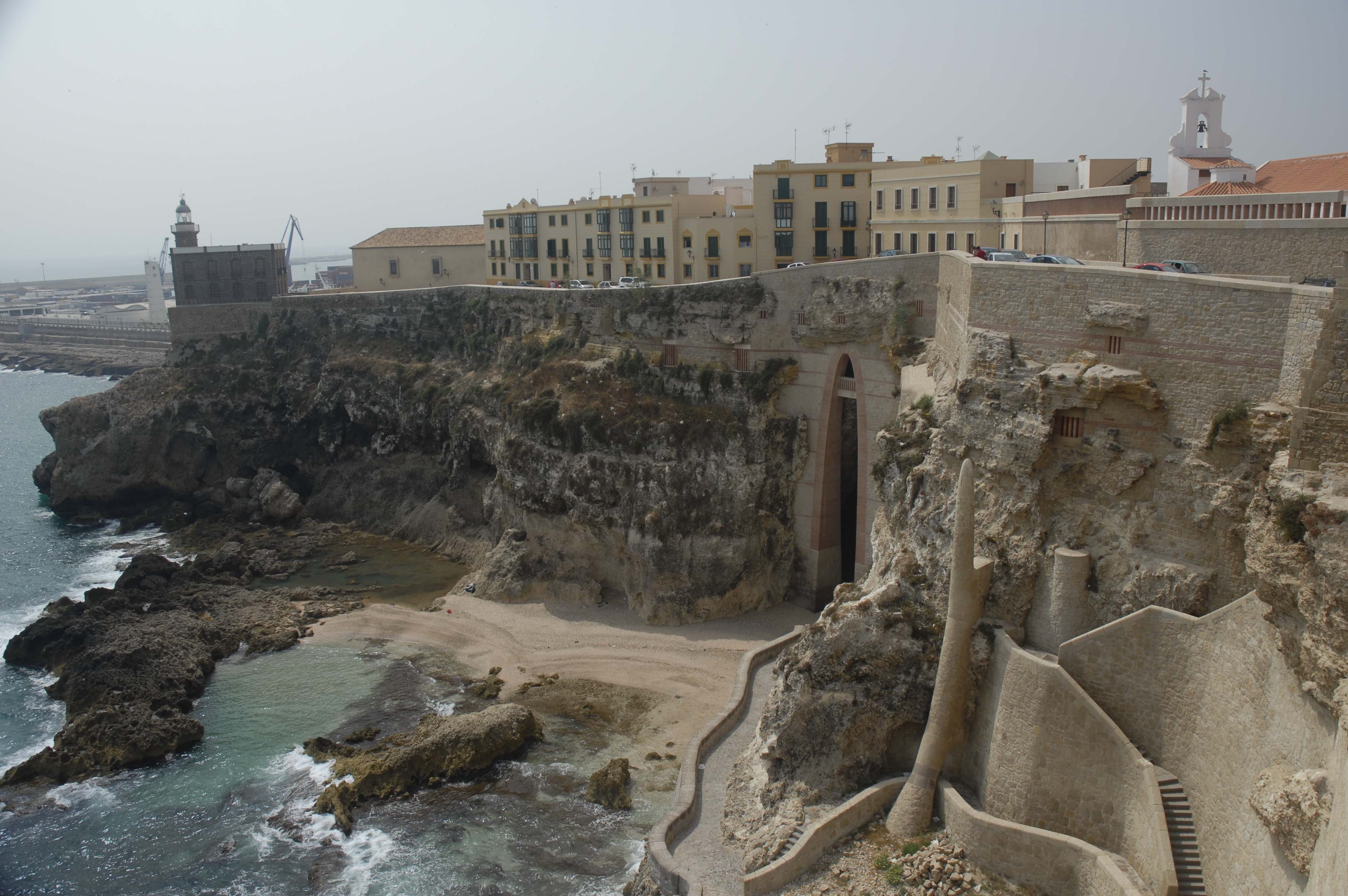
- Established: 18th century
- Location: Melilla
- Coordinates: 35°17′40″N 2°56′01″W
- Type: Museum and Caves
- Visitors: 59 600(2013)
- Owner: Autonomous City of Melilla
- Website: Conventico Caves

The Conventico Caves are a historic cave system in Melilla la Vieja. Accessible through the Museum of Sacred Art in the Spanish city of Melilla, they form part of the Historic Artistic Complex of the City of Melilla, an Asset of Cultural Interest.

== History ==
Initially, natural caves excavated by water in Cala de Trápana were used by Phoenicians, Romans, and Arabs to shelter themselves by placing their ships in the large cavity. Lastly, they were utilized by the Spanish, who excavated several levels above the natural caves in the 18th century to store food, although their most famous use was when they were used to house the population during the Siege of Melilla (1774–1775).

In 1925, with the construction of the Port of Melilla, the inlet was filled with sand, forming a beach. Between 1993 and 1995, the parabolic arch and the walls towards Cala de Trápana were built, and later brick vaults were built on the third level. The streets above these were then paved, Miguel Acosta and Concepción, due to the risk of collapse, making them accessible to visitors. This renovation coincided with the 500th anniversary of the Spanish occupation of Melilla with the installation of wooden pavements. Between 1998 and 2000, the first level was shored up and reinforced, all the levels were connected, and toilets and a sewage treatment plant were built under the staircase that goes down to Trápana.

== Description ==
The cave system's entrance has a gigantic open cavity, reinforced by a parabolic arch of stone and brick and three interconnected levels, from lowest to highest. The first consists of two intersecting naves and was used as a church, the second, a set of rooms connected to each other and with windows to the outside, the third being similar to the previous one, but with smaller and lower rooms.
