= Melilla Museum =

- Museo de Melilla
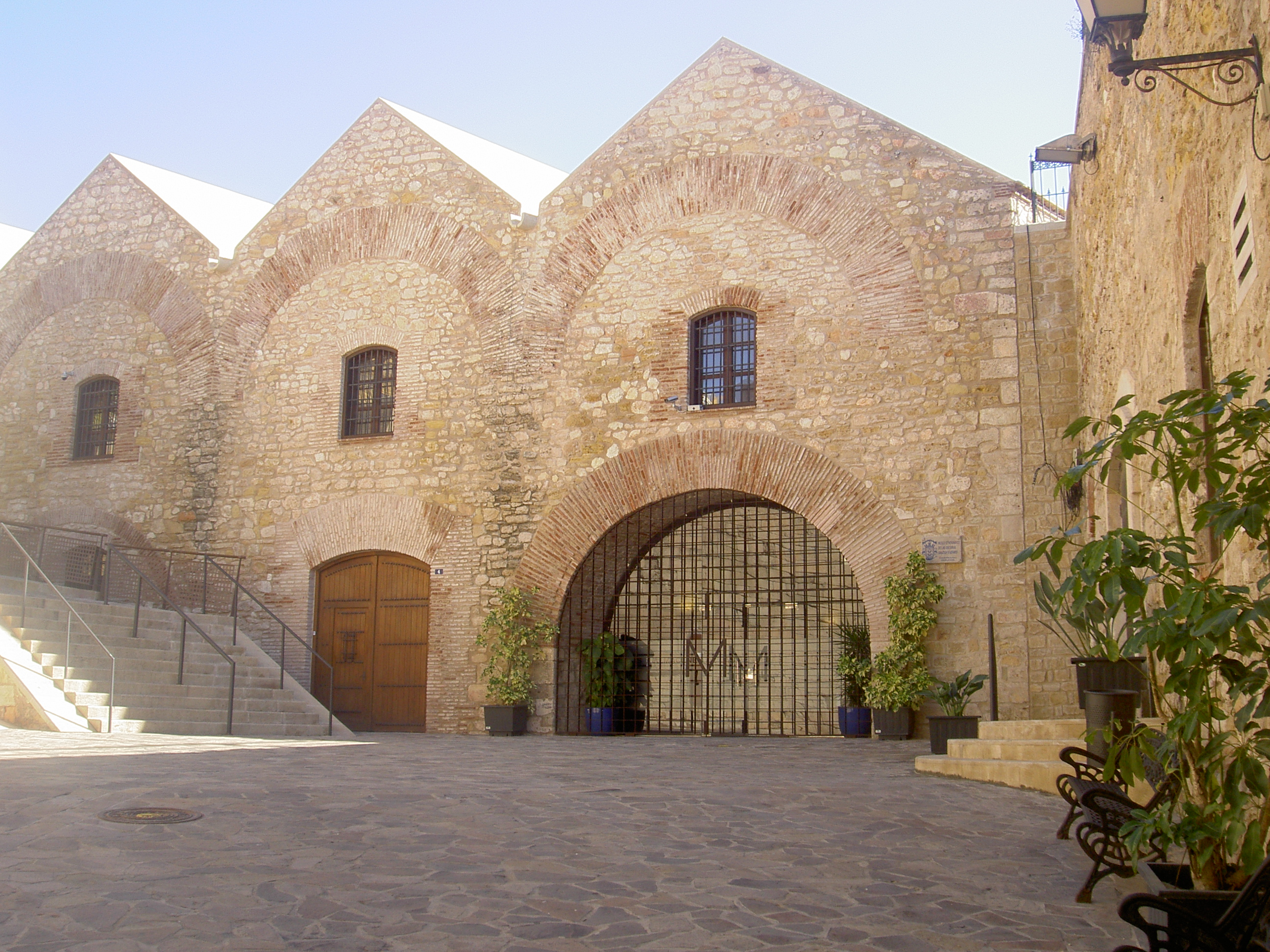
- Established: November 7, 1950; 75 years ago
- Location: Melilla, Spain
- Coordinates: 35°17′36″N 02°56′02″W
- Type: Museum of History, Archaeology and Ethnography
- Collections: 200 works -section History- 1,500 pieces -section Archaeology- 800 pieces -section Ethnography-
- Visitors: 34 346 (2015)
- Director: Francisco Alfaya
- Owners: Department of Culture, Cultural Heritage and the Elderly of the Autonomous City of Melilla
- Website: Melilla Museum

Melilla Museum is a museum in the Spanish city of Melilla located in the old Almacén de las Peñuelas, in the First Fortified Enclosure of Melilla la Vieja.

== History ==
At the beginning of the 20th century, Rafael Fernández de Castro began to collect the pieces and material resulting from the excavations of Cerro de San Lorenzo in the Casa Salama, headquarters of the Junta de Arbitrios, although it was not officially considered a museum, as there was no cataloging or public exhibition.

Years later, the Municipal Museum appeared in the basement of the Parque Hernández music hall, open to the public and moved, its location was not suitable, in the 1950s to the Baluarte de la Concepción Alta, in a historical museum with two sections, Archaeology and Documentation, as well as military collections and heraldic emblems.

They remained there until 1987, when they moved to the Torre de la Vela and from there, to the Almacenes de las Peñuelas, where it has remained since 2011, being on September 11, 2018, a section dedicated to the gypsy people.

== Sections ==
Ethnographic Museum of Sephardic, Berber and Gypsy Cultures

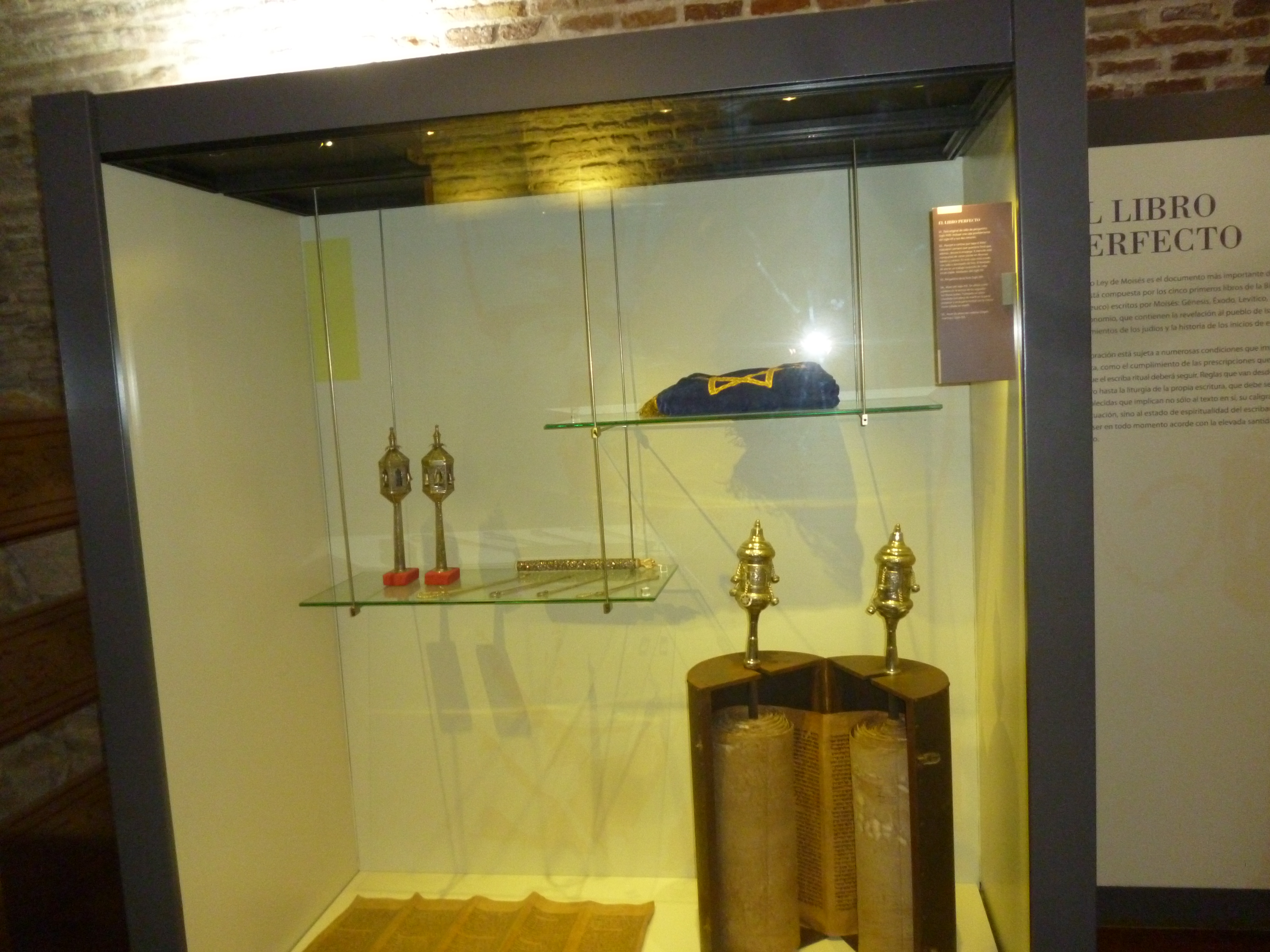

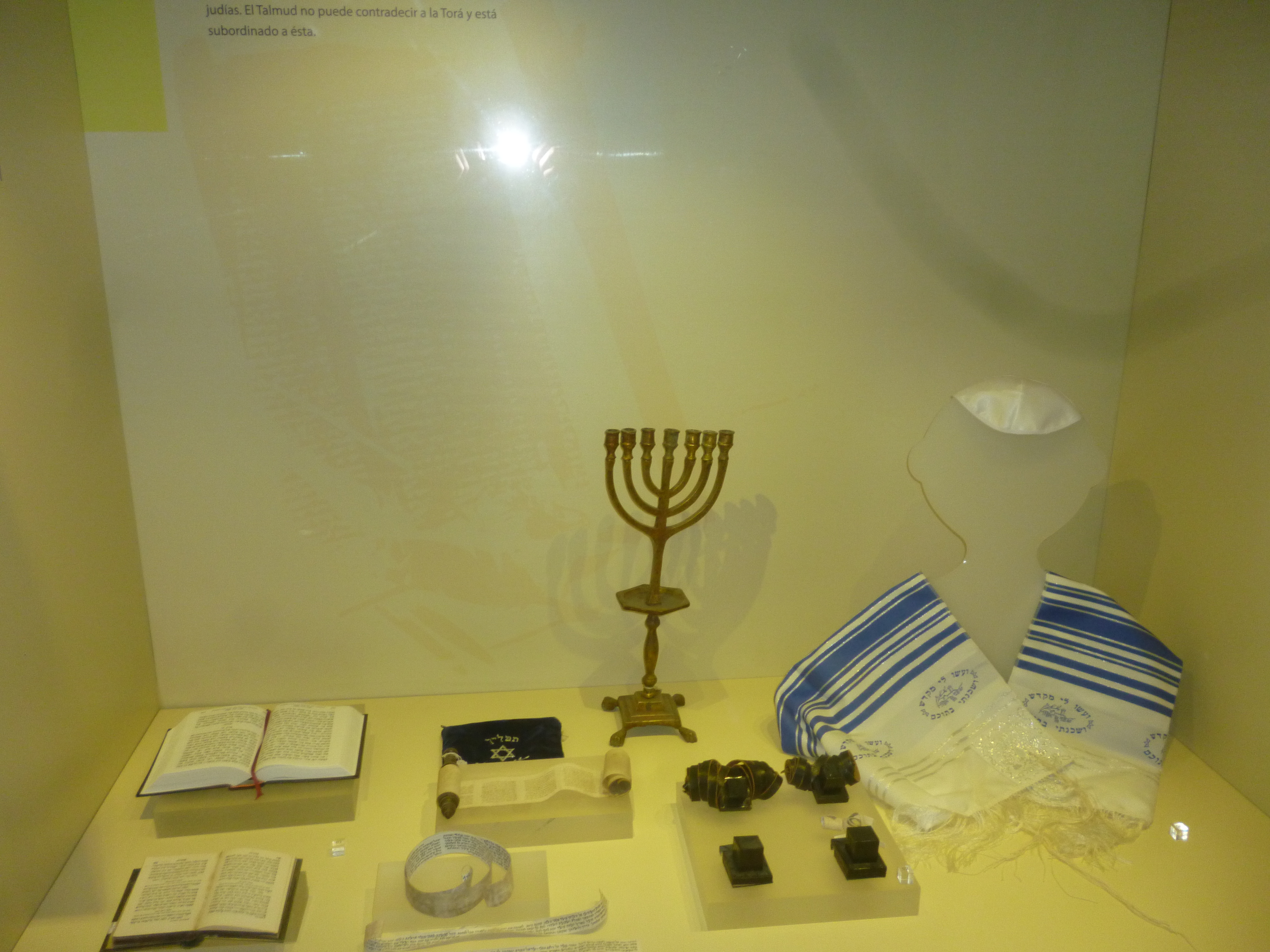

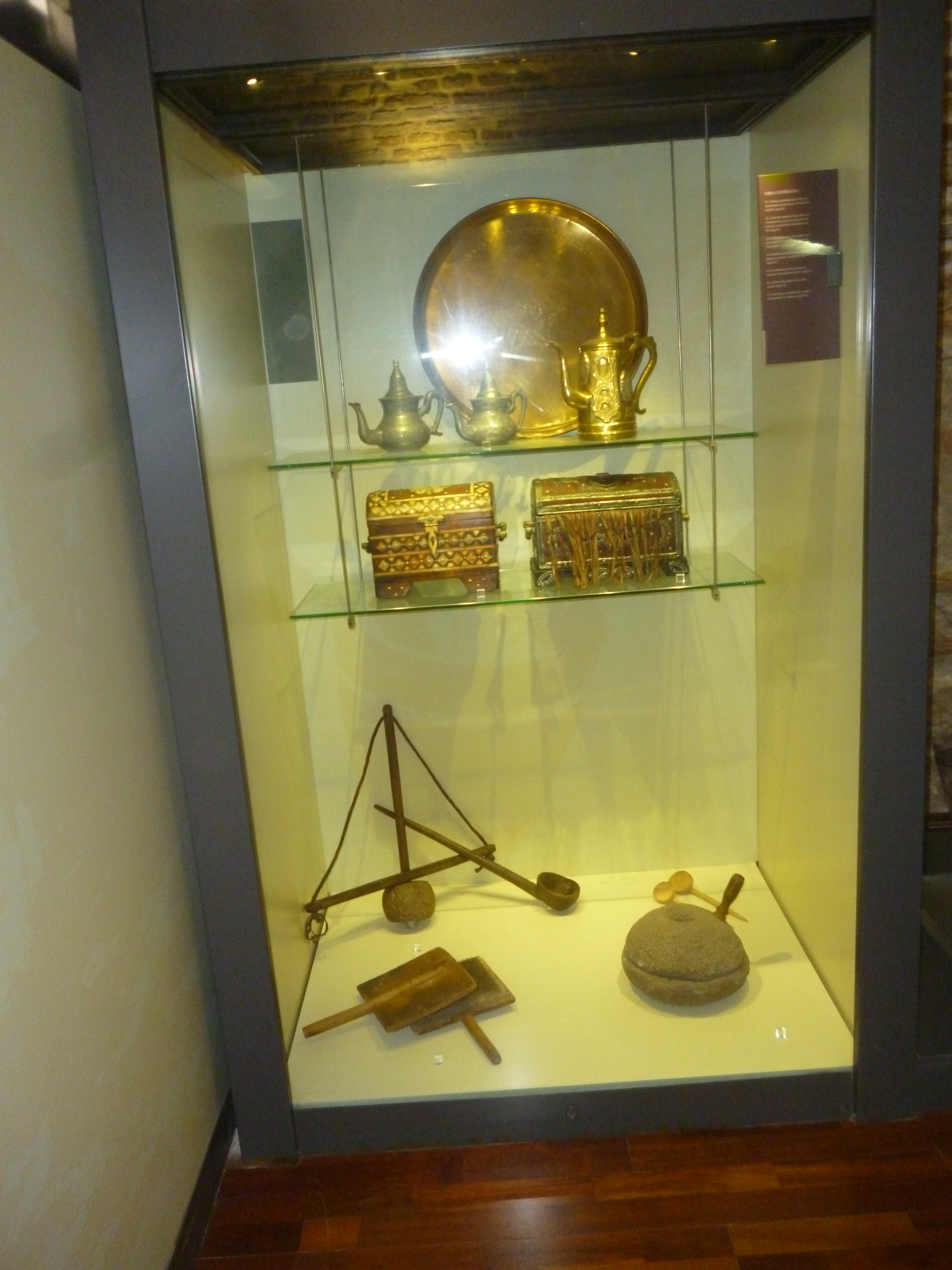

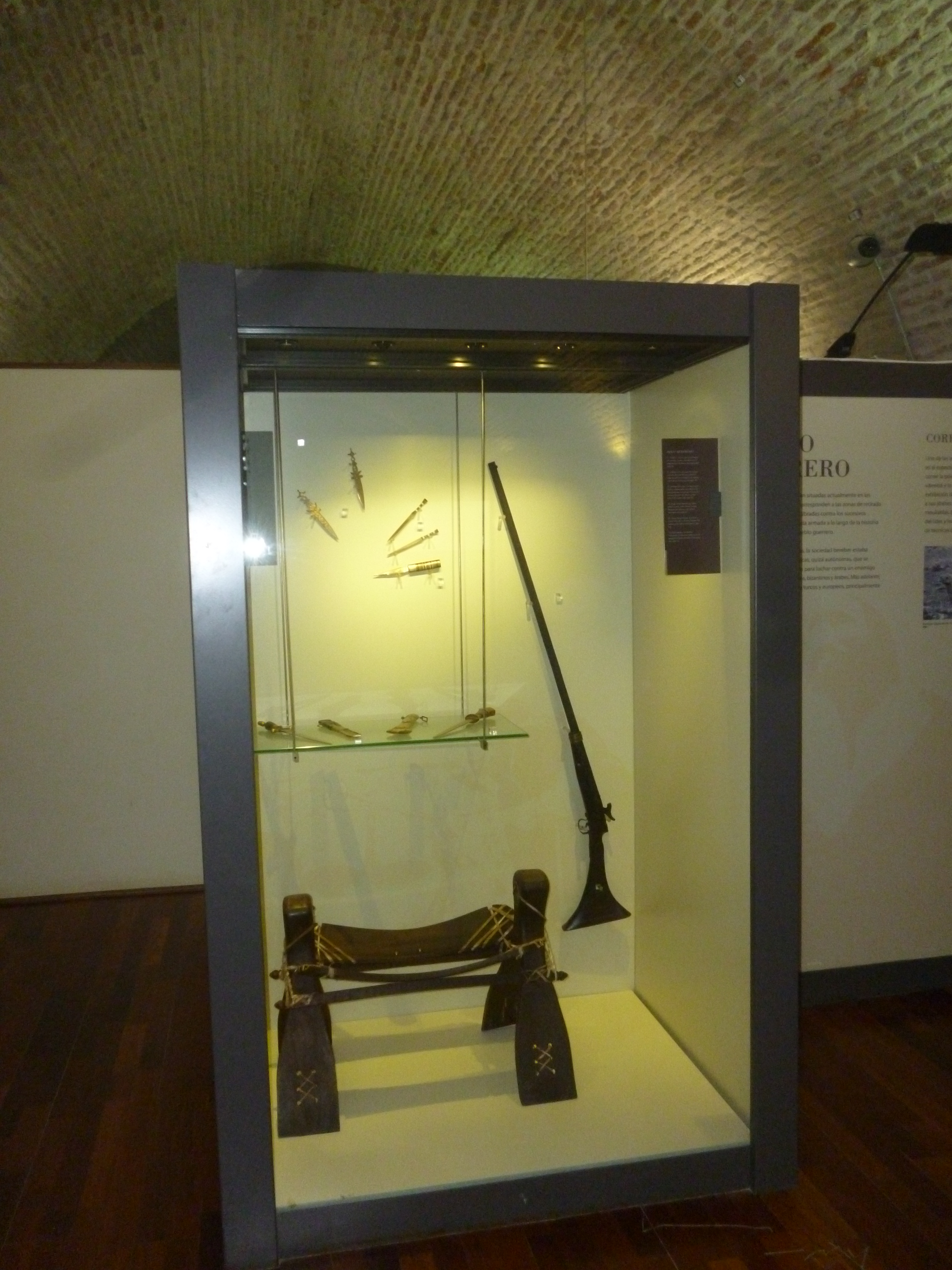

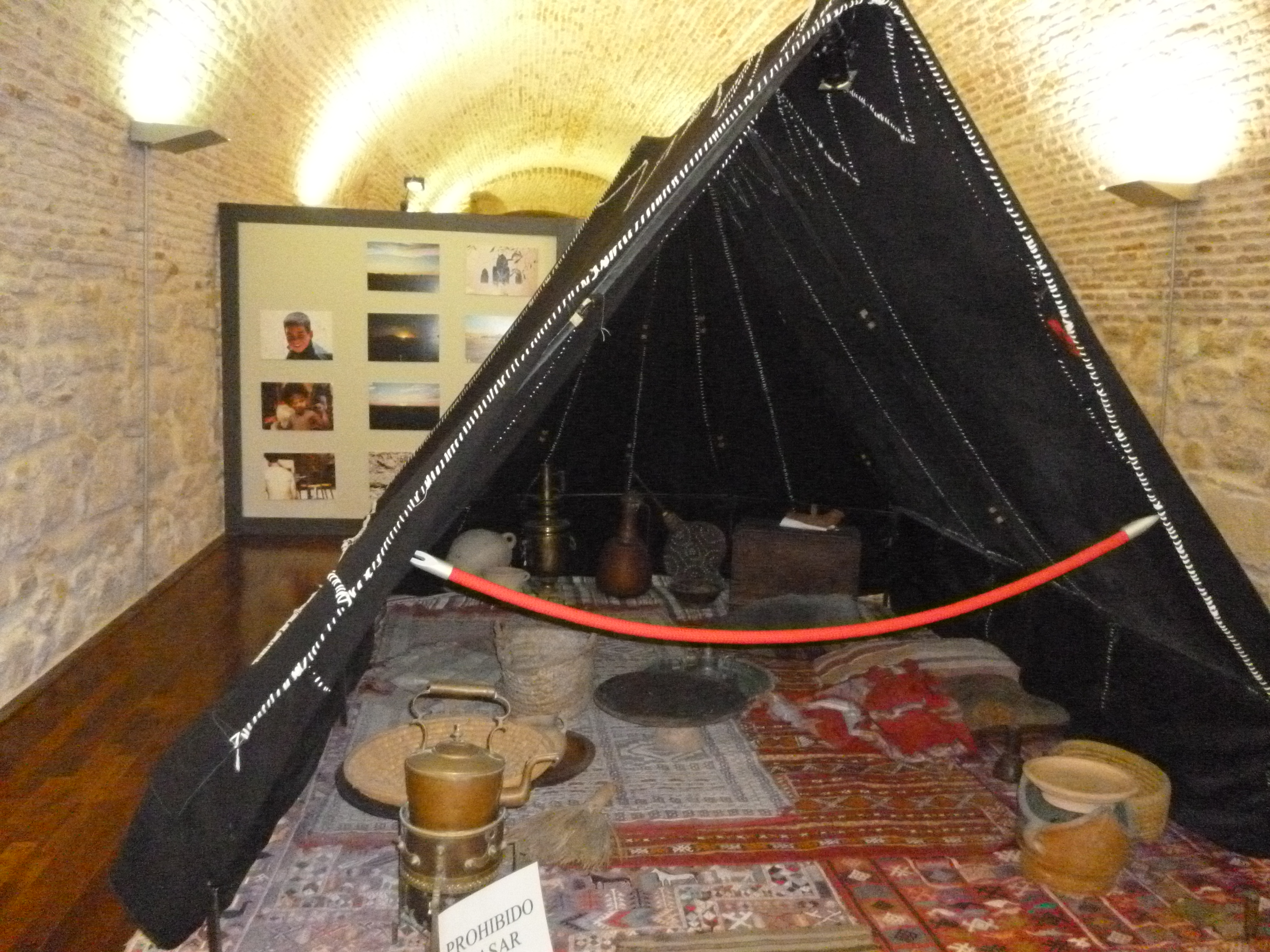

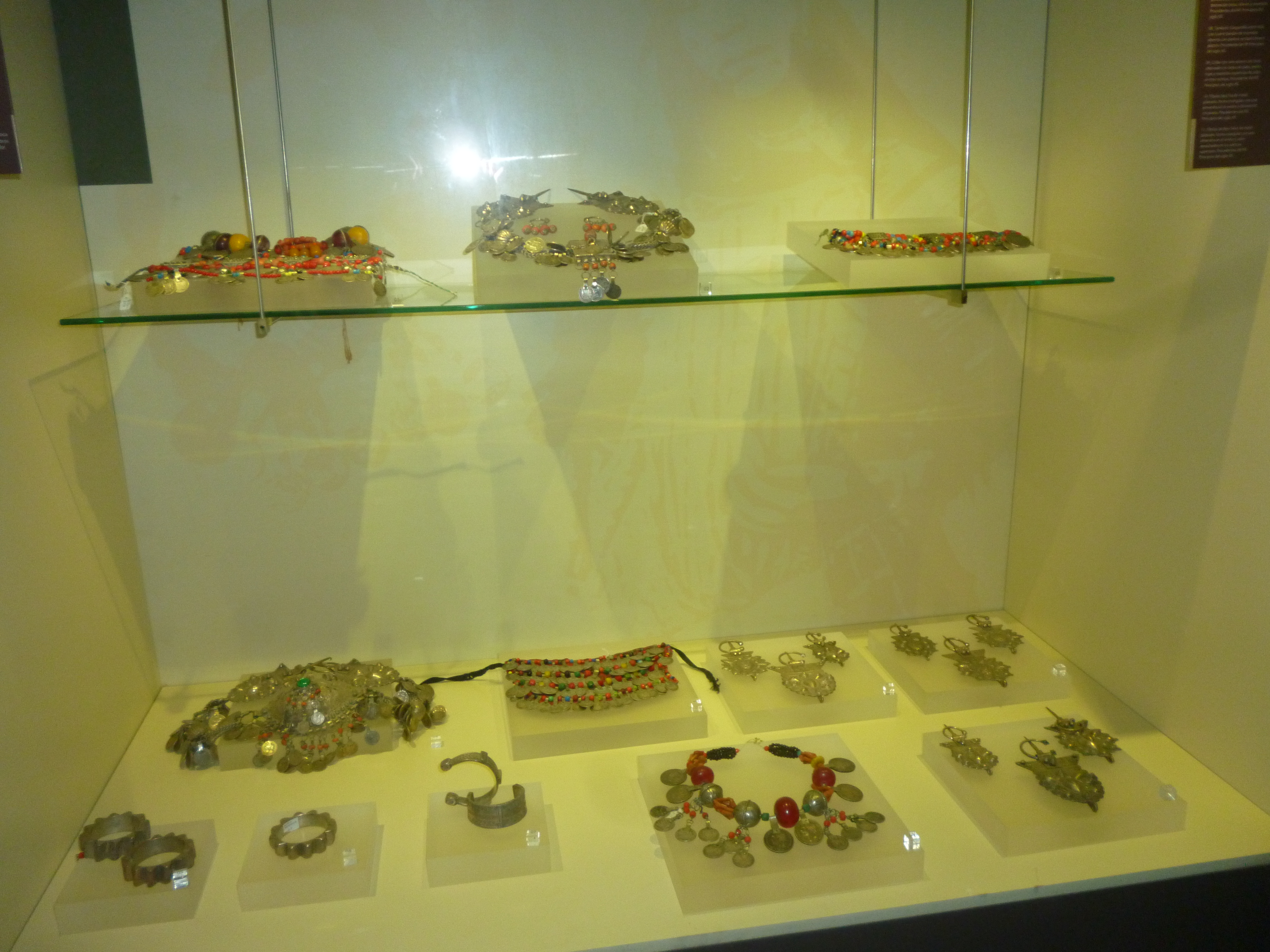

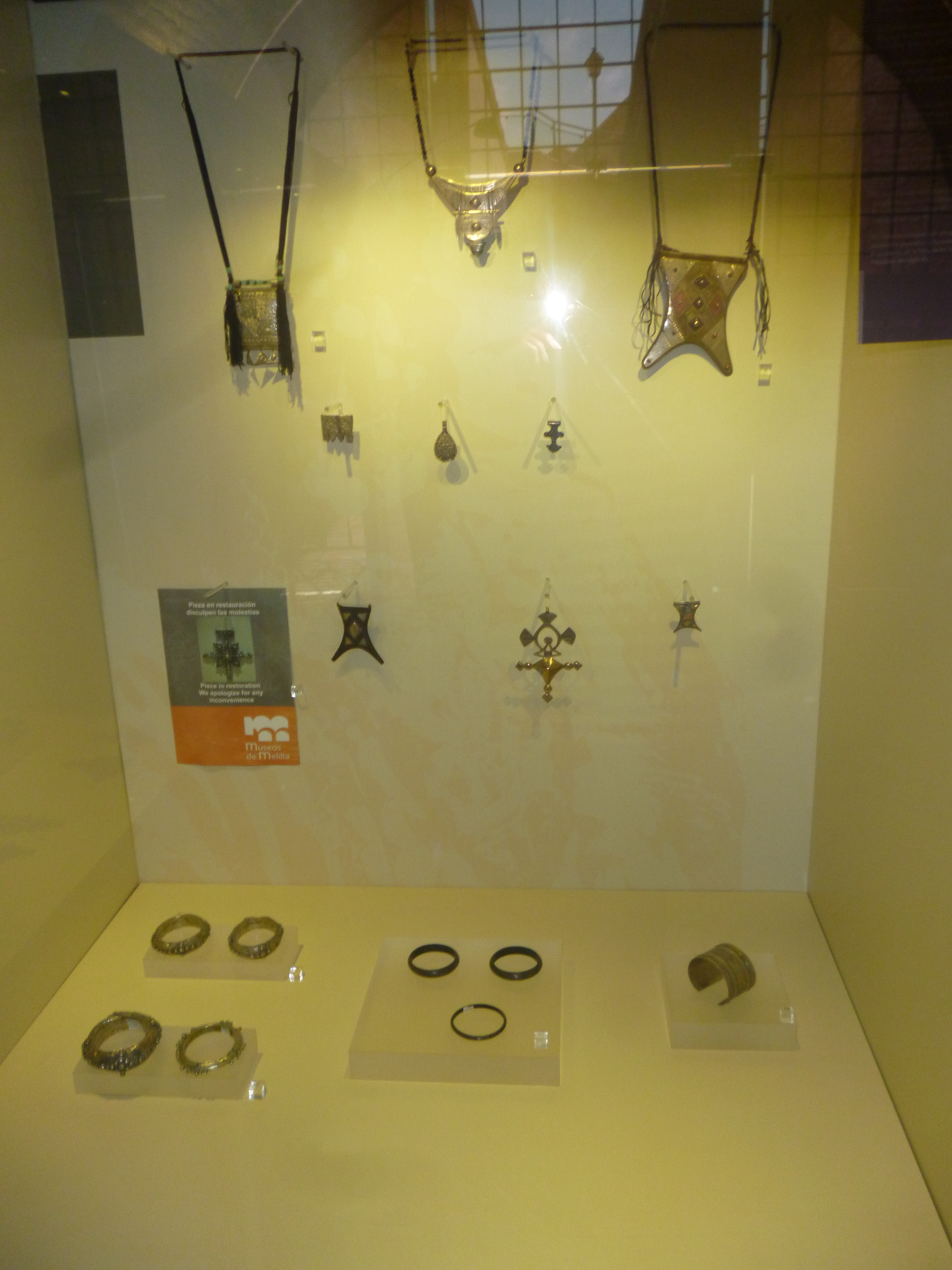

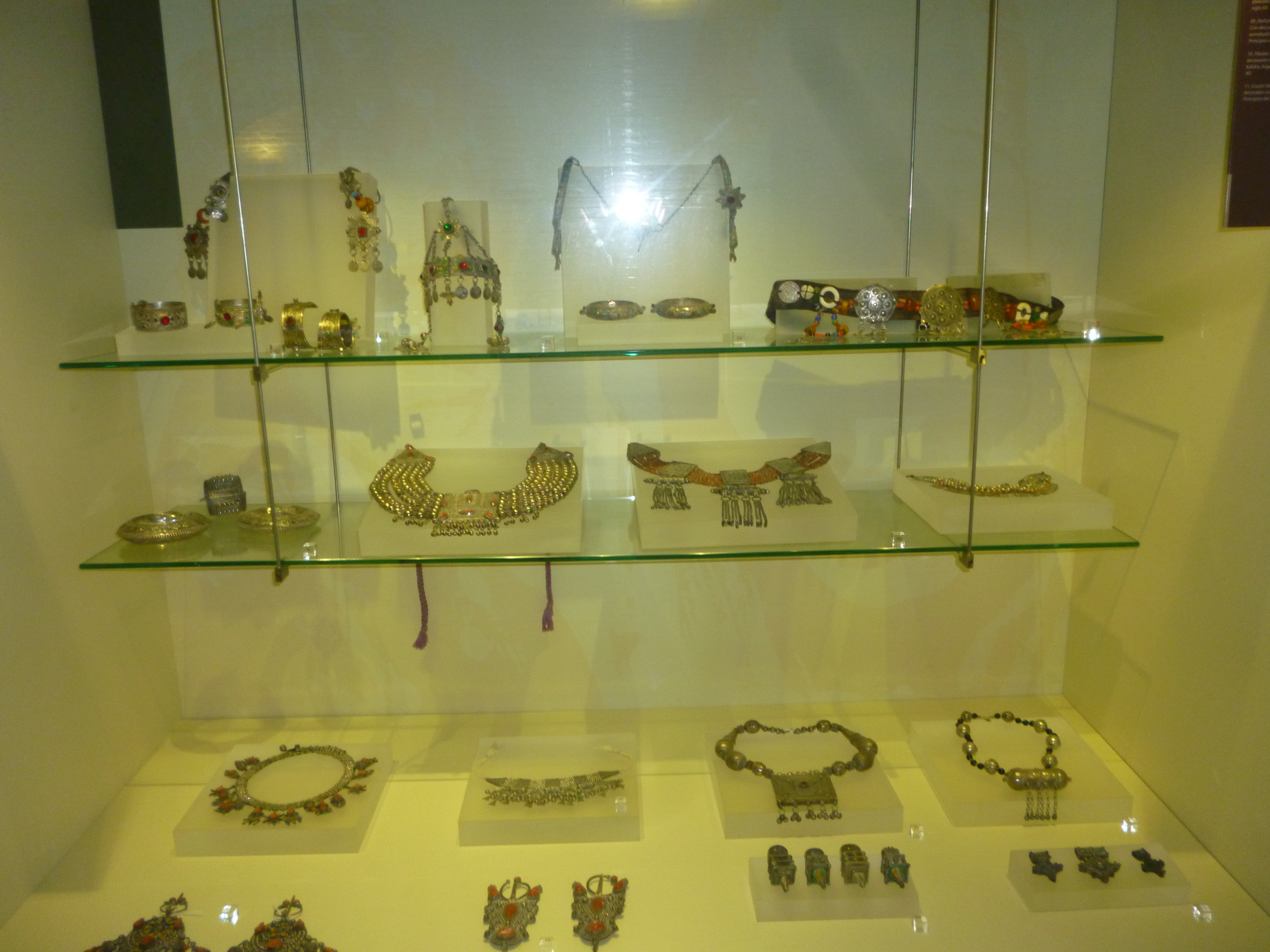

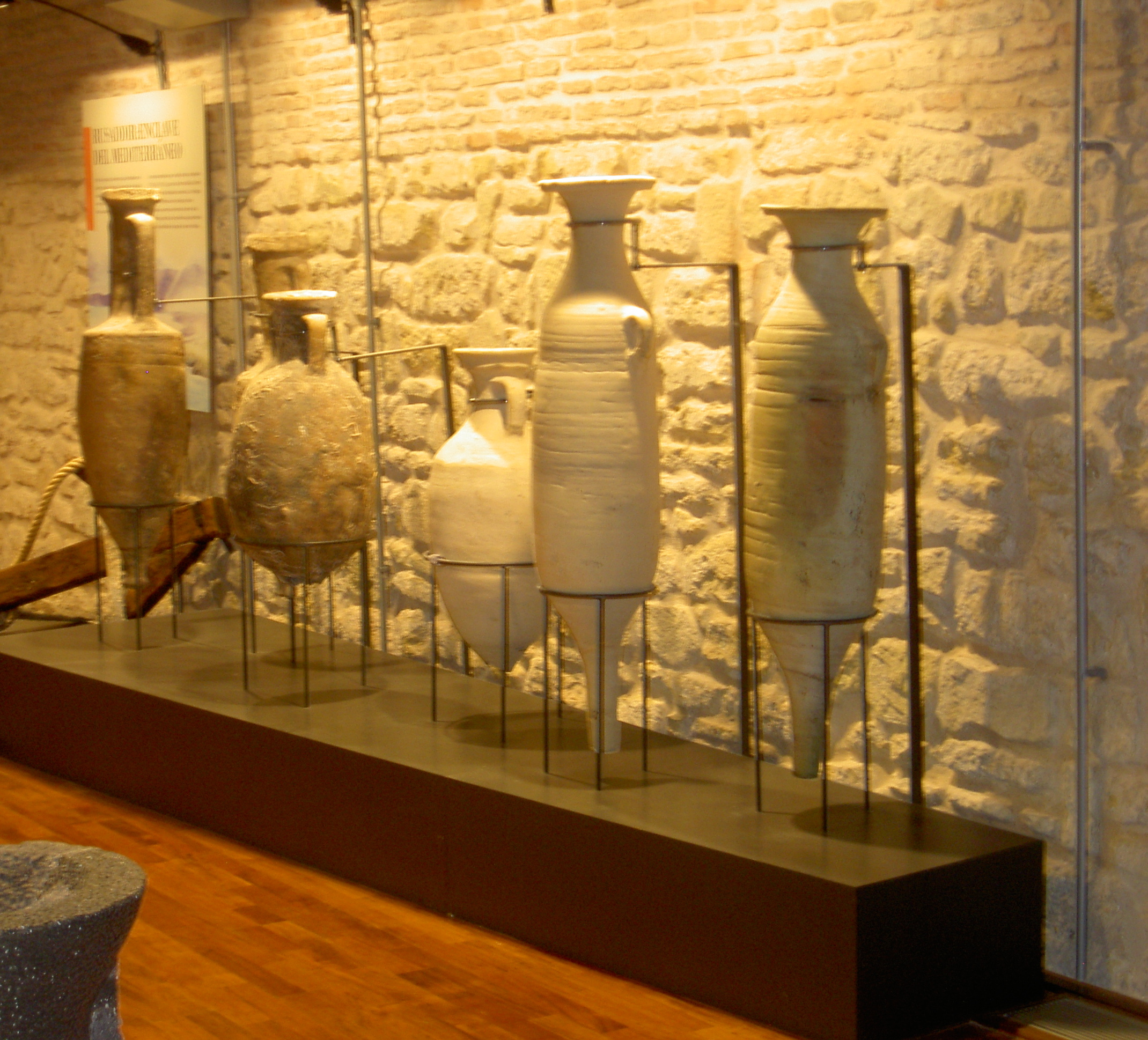

It is located on the ground floor, highlighting the recreation of the Or Zaruah Synagogue and the collection of Berber jewelry.

Archeology and History Museum

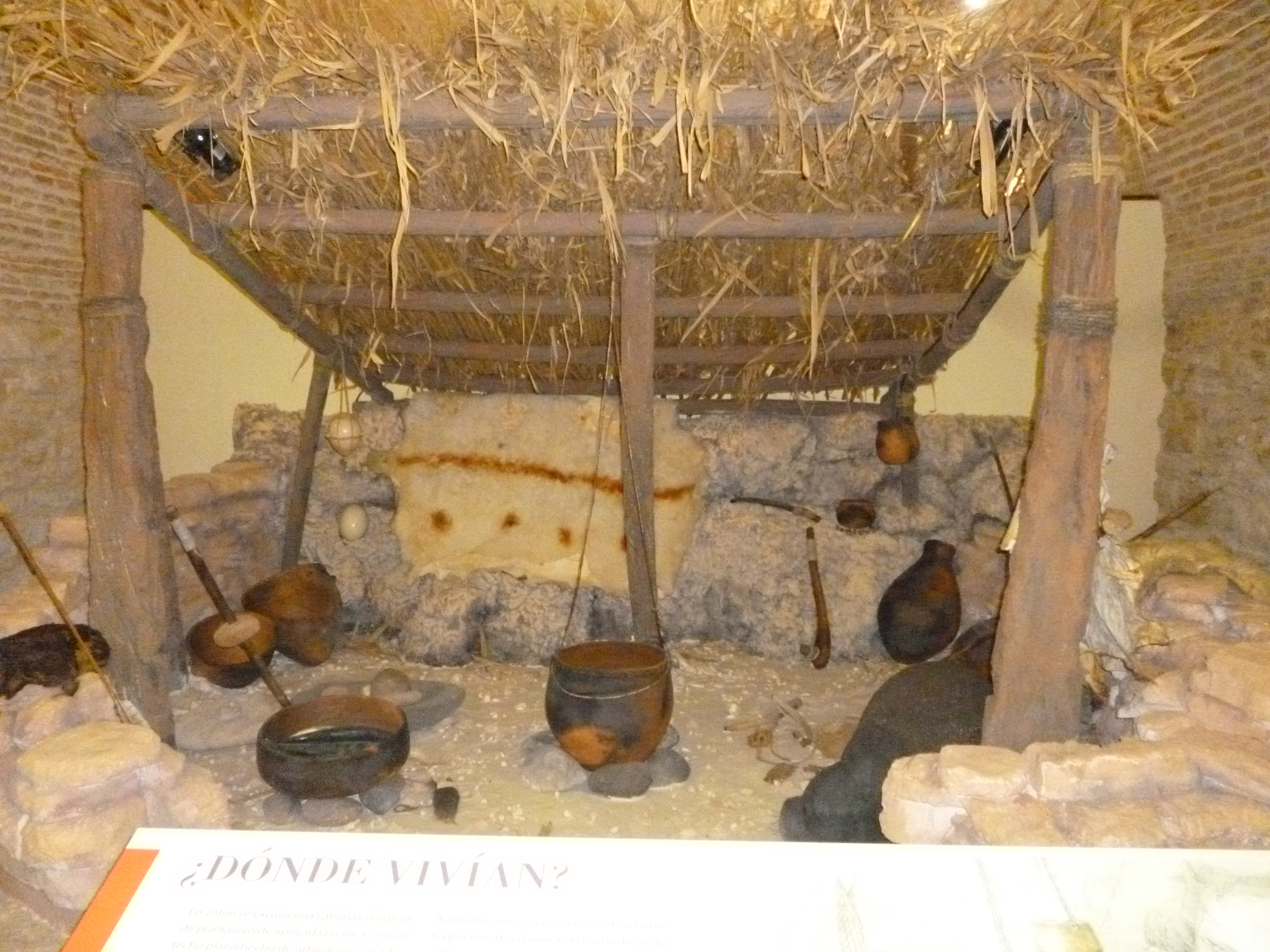

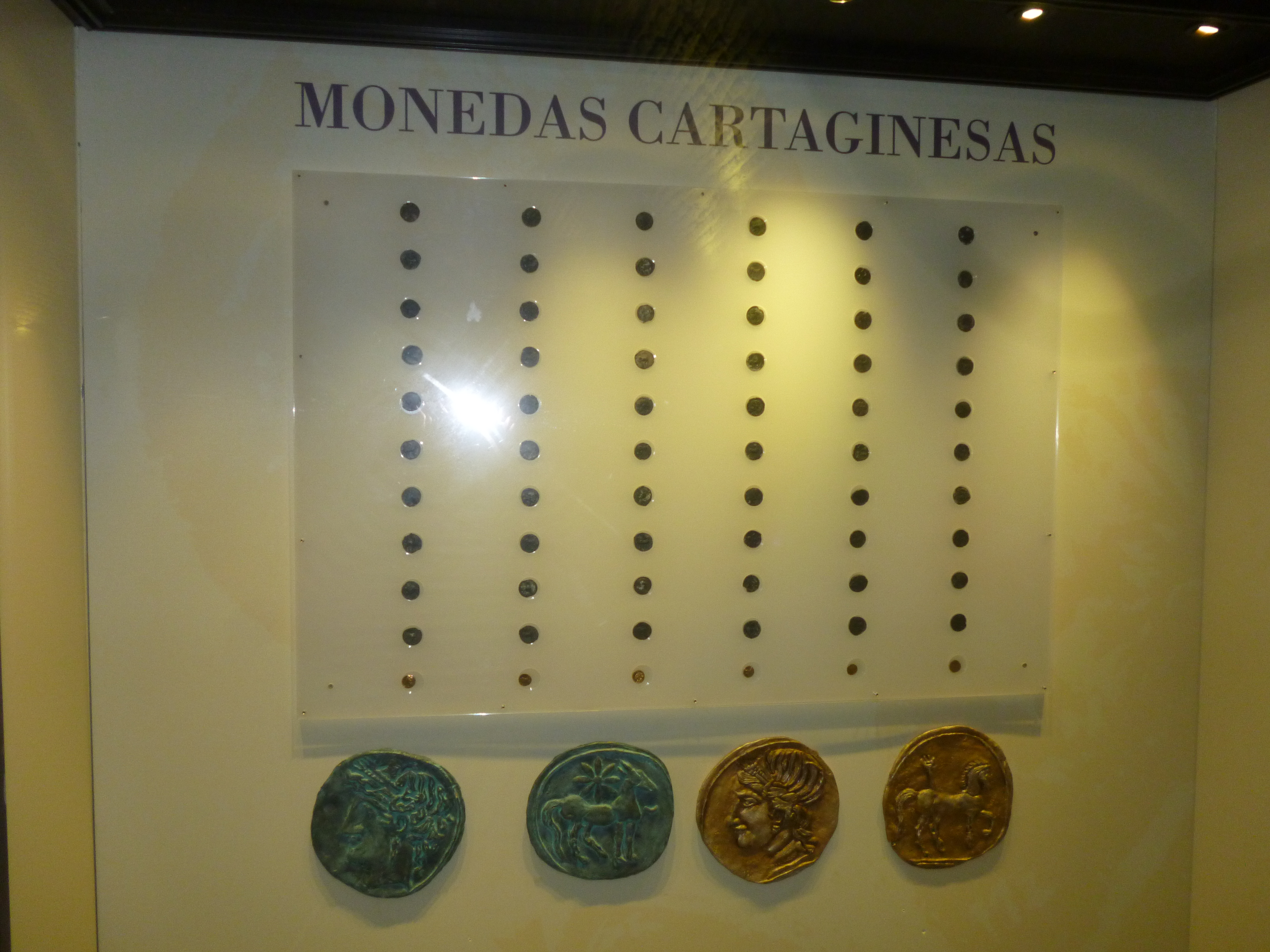

It is located on the upper floor, with ceramics from El Zafrín, Carthaginian coins, the recreation of a Moorish burial, a Muslim treasure, a giant model of Melilla la Vieja, a copy of that of León Gil de Palacios, busts of Alfonso XIII and the Republic, as well as a multitude of plans.
