= Melilla la Vieja =

Fortress in Melilla, Spain

Old Melilla
- Melilla la Vieja
- Melilla, Spain
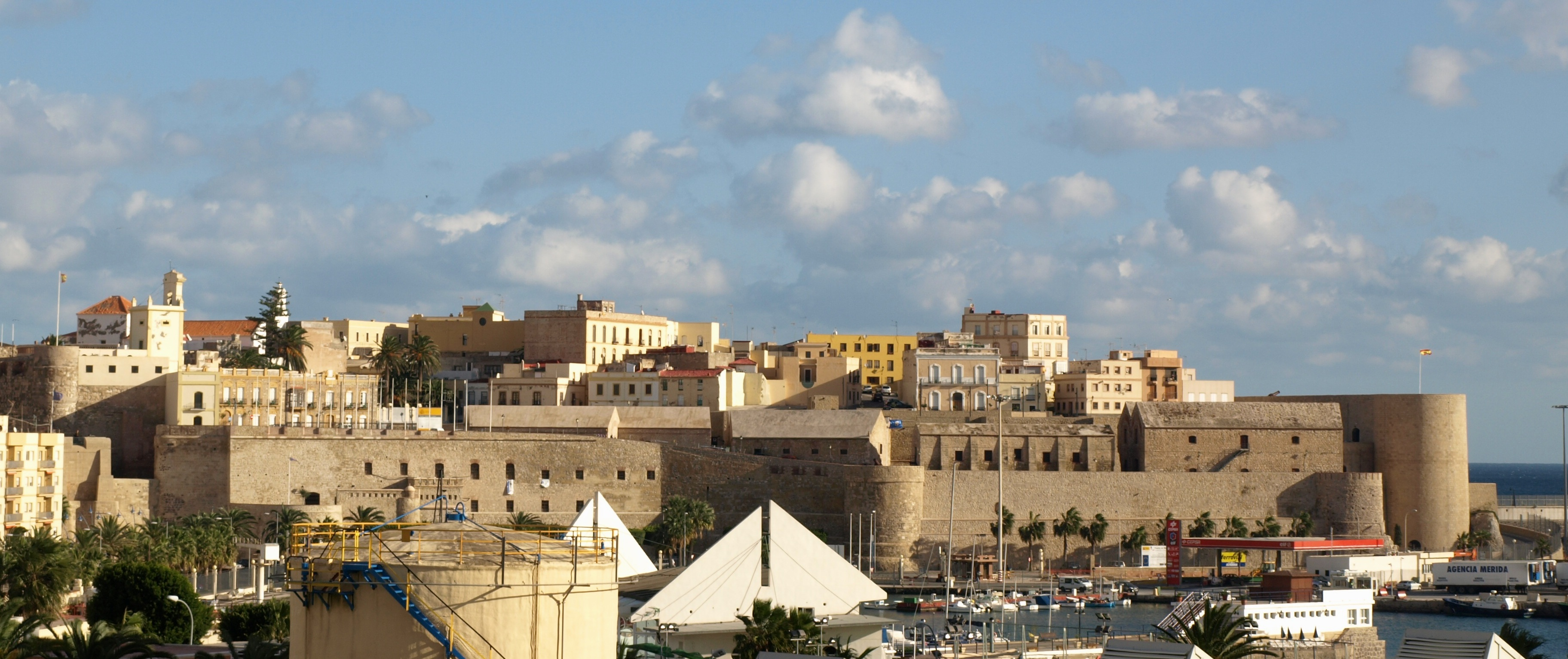
- Melilla la Vieja from the sea.

Site information
- Type: Fortress
- Open to the public: Yes
- Condition: Well-preserved (partly reconstructed)

Location
- Melilla
- Location within Spain
- Coordinates: 35.294°N 2.934°W

Site history
- Built: 16th and 17th centuries
- Built by: Catholic Monarchs of Spain
- Materials: Rammed earth
- Battles/wars: Siege of Melilla (1774–1775)

Spanish Cultural Heritage
- Type: Non-movable
- Criteria: Monument
- Designated: 11 August 1953

Melilla la Vieja ("Old Melilla") is a large fortress which stands immediately to the north of the port in Melilla, one of Spain's Plazas de soberanía on the north African coast. Built during the 16th and 17th centuries, much of the fortress has been restored in recent years.

The fortress contains many of Melilla's most important historical sites, among them an archaeological museum, a military museum, the Church of the Conception, and a series of caves and tunnels, like Conventico Caves, in use since Phoenician times.
