= Juan Latino =

Ethiopian academic in Spain

- Born: c. 1518; Ethiopia
- Died: 1594; Granada, Spain
- Other name: Juan de Sessa
- Occupations: Professor, academic, Latinist

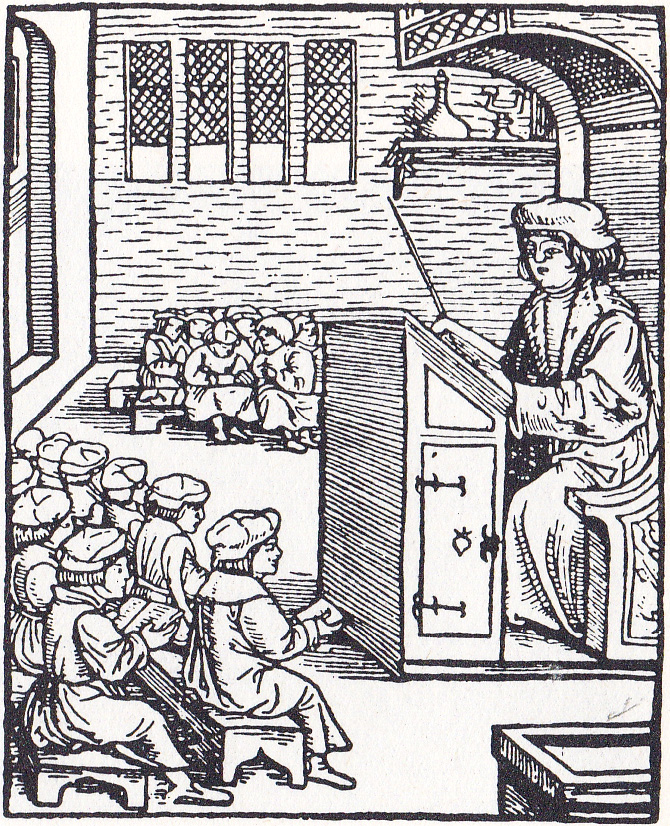
A 16th-century monastery school classroom. While no verified portrait of Juan Latino exists, this image reflects the kind of academic setting in which he taught.

Juan Latino (also known as Juan de Sessa; c. 1518, Ethiopia – c. 1594/1597, Granada, Spain) was a Spanish professor, Latinist, and writer of Ethiopian origin. Enslaved in his youth and brought to Spain, he later gained his freedom and earned a degree at the University of Granada, where he became a professor of Latin language and grammar. He is widely recognized as the first African to receive a European university education and hold an academic post in Europe. No verified portrait of Juan Latino is known to survive, though his academic contributions remain well documented.

== Life ==
Juan Latino was born in 1518 to a black slave from Ethiopia, since 1520 slave of Elvira Fernández de Córdoba (c.1500-1524), 2nd Duchess of Sessa and her husband Luis Fernández de Córdoba y Zúñiga (c. 1480–1526), 4th Count of Cabra.

He went to Granada where he was educated together with his owners' son Gonzalo II Fernández de Córdoba (1520-1578), third of the same title, and with the grandson of Gonzalo Fernández de Córdoba, another famous Gonzalo, who was called "Gran Capitán".

His literary and fiercest personal enemy León Roque de Santiago mentioned that Latino was born in Baena, as the son of a black slave woman and his master, the Duke of Sessa, Luis Fernández de Córdoba, who was also the father of his childhood friend and protector Gonzalo II Fernández de Córdoba.

Latino excelled in classical languages and music, and studied with the famous grammarian Pedro de Mota. The Duke himself commented on his dexterity, calling him: "rara avis in terra corbo simillima nigro" (in English: "a rare bird, black like a crow").

The University of Granada was opened in 1526, five months after the coming of Emperor Dawit II to the city. After the papal bull, it began to confer degrees in 1533 and was set free on 1538.

In 1545, in the presence of the Archbishop, the listener of the Real Chancery, Conde de Tendilla, and many other gentlemen, Latino, aged 28 years old, received the degree of Bachelor.

One of the houses he frequently visited to teach his varied grammatical teachings was the property of the Duke's administrator Licenciado Carleval, where his young daughter, Ana de Carleval, received classes from Latino. Ana de Carleval was famous in the city for her extraordinary beauty and she was engaged (by her father) to Don Fernando de Valor (future Abén Humeya). Juan Latino and the young lady started a relationship and a marriage took place between 1547 and 1548. They had 4 children. The playwright Diego Jiménez de Enciso (1585–1633) composed a comedy about him and his love-affair with his student and future wife, named Juan Latino.

On 31 December 1556, in Granada, Latino received the Chair of grammar and Latin language of the cathedral which he held for 20 years.

Latino retired in 1586 and died between 1594 and 1597. He was buried in the church of Santa Ana de Granada, whose archive from that time has since been burned.

His life was immortalized in a 17th-century play, La comedia famosa de Juan Latino, by Diego Jiménez de Enciso.

== Works ==
Latino published three volumes of poems between 1573 and 1585.

His poem Austrias Carmen, was dedicated to John of Austria after his victory over the Morisco insurrection in Granada, known as the War of the Alpujarras (1568–1572).

He has been hailed as one of the first writers to have used signifyin(g).
