= Duke of Baena =

Dukedom of Spain

Dukedom of Baena
- Creation date: 19 August 1566
- Created by: Philip II
- Peerage: Peerage of Spain
- First holder: Gonzalo Fernández de Córdoba y Fernández de Córdoba, 1st Duke of Baena
- Present holder: María Cristina Ruiz de Arana y Marone-Cinzano, 18th Duchess of Baena

Duke of Baena (Spanish: Duque de Baena) is a hereditary title in the Peerage of Spain, accompanied by the dignity of Grandee and granted in 1566 by Philip II to Gonzalo Fernández de Córdoba II, who was the 7th Lord of Baena, 5th Count of Cabra and 3rd Duke of Sessa, Santángelo, Terranova, Andría and Montalto.

The name makes reference to the town of Baena in the province of Córdoba.

The 17th Duke of Baena was son-in-law of Infanta Maria Cristina of Spain, daughter of King Alfonso XIII, descendant of Queen Victoria of the United Kingdom.

== Dukes of Baena (1566) ==
- Gonzalo Fernández de Córdoba y Fernández de Córdoba, 1st Duke of Baena
- Francisca Fernández de Córdoba y Fernández de Córdoba, 2nd Duchess of Baena
- Antonio Fernández de Córdoba y Cardona, 3rd Duke of Baena
- Luis Fernández de Córdoba y Aragón, 4th Duke of Baena
- Antonio Fernández de Córdoba y Rojas, 5th Duke of Baena
- Francisco Fernández de Córdoba y Pimentel, 6th Duke of Baena
- Félix Fernández de Córdoba y Cardona, 7th Duke of Baena
- Francisco Fernández de Córdoba y Aragón, 8th Duke of Baena
- Ventura Francisca Fernández de Córdoba y Aragón, 9th Duchess of Baena
- Ventura Osorio de Moscoso y Fernández de Córdoba, 10th Duke of Baena
- Vicente Joaquín Osorio de Moscoso y Guzmán, 11th Duke of Baena
- Vicente Pío Osorio de Moscoso y Álvarez de Toledo, 12th Duke of Baena
- Vicente Pío Osorio de Moscoso y Ponce de León, 13th Duke of Baena
- María Rosalía Osorio de Moscoso y Carvajal, 14th Duchess of Baena
- Mariano Ruiz de Arana y Osorio de Moscoso, 15th Duke of Baena
- José María Ruiz de Arana y Baüer, 16th Duke of Baena
- José María Ruiz de Arana y Montalvo, 17th Duke of Baena
- María Cristina Ruiz de Arana y Marone-Cinzano, 18th Duchess of Baena

== See also ==
- List of dukes in the peerage of Spain
- List of current grandees of Spain
