= Luis Fernández de Córdoba y Zúñiga =

Spanish nobleman

- 4th Count of Cabra, Viscount of Iznájar, Lord of Baena, Duke of Sessa, Duke of Terranova, Duke of Santángelo
- Successor: Gonzalo II Fernández de Córdoba
- Died: 17 August 1526; Rome
- Wife: Elvira Fernández de Córdoba y Manrique
- Father: Diego Fernández de Córdoba y Mendoza
- Mother: Francisca de Zúñiga y de la Cerda

Luis Fernández de Córdoba (born c. 1480, died 17 August 1526) was a Spanish nobleman, count of Cabra and viscount of Iznájar, lord of the house of Baena, Duke of Sessa, of Terranova and of Santángelo by his marriage to his cousin, Elvira Fernández de Córdoba y Manrique (all of these duchies were created, between 1497 and 1507, for Elvira's father, the "Great Captain" Gonzalo Fernández de Córdoba). Luis was the son of Diego Fernández de Córdoba y Mendoza (d. 11 August 1525), third count of Cabra and Francisca de Zúñiga y de la Cerda.

A courtier and ambassador of Charles V, Holy Roman Emperor, he went to Flanders in the company of his brothers Pedro and Francisco, and in 1518 accompanied Charles V on his trip to Spain for his coronation. He was in Italy in mid-1521, in the Sixth Italian War, as one of the candidates for the general captaincy of the Spanish army (the position was given to Fernando d'Ávalos in 1522). On 17 September 1522, he was appointed imperial ambassador to Pope Adrian VI, replacing Juan Manuel, lord of Belmonte, and continued in this position under Pope Clement VII from November 1523 to May 1526. He also held the position of Spanish vice-regent in Italy, nominally placed above the Viceroy of Naples as well as all other ambassadors and military commanders stationed in Italy.

In 1526, at the start of the Seventh Italian War (the War of the League of Cognac), where the emperor and the pope found themselves on opposing sides, he marched to the Kingdom of Naples together with Hugo of Moncada to gather troops against Rome (ultimately resulting in the Sack of Rome on 6 May 1527). He fell ill in San Marino, and asked Clement VII for permission to enter the city of Rome to be treated. He was admitted to the city and died there on 17 August.

His marriage to Elvira (18 March 1518) resulted in four children. The firstborn, Gonzalo II Fernández de Córdoba (1520–1578), inherited his titles. Gonzalo was followed by three sisters, María, Beatriz and Francisca.

Luis survived his father only by one year, and thus held his comital titles only from August 1525 until his own death in August 1526. His ducal titles were held by marriage, from 1518. The ducal title were inherited by his daughter Francisca after Gonzalo died without issue in 1578, and after Francisca's death by the son of Beatriz, Antonio Fernández de Córdoba y Cardona.
