= Duke of Sessa =

Dukedom of Spain

Dukedom of Sessa
- Creation date: 1 January 1507
- Created by: Ferdinand II
- Peerage: Peerage of Spain
- First holder: Gonzalo Fernández de Córdoba y Enríquez de Aguilar, 1st Duke of Sessa
- Present holder: Gonzalo Barón y Gavito, 21st Duke of Sessa

Duke of Sessa is a Spanish noble title awarded to Gonzalo Fernández de Córdoba by Ferdinand II in 1507. It was the fifth ducal title bestowed on Gonzalo, after the ducal titles of Santángelo (1497), Terranova (1502), Andría (1507) and Montalto (1507).

Its territorial designation refers to Sessa Aurunca, at the time in the Kingdom of Naples. The title is one of the numerous duchies created by the Catholic Monarchs and never represented any territorial claim.

With the loss of the Kingdom of Naples in 1806, the designation has ceased to be located in Spanish-controlled territory. The 15th duke, Vicente Pío Osorio de Moscoso y Ponce de León (1801–1864), held a total of 109 titles of nobility, among them fourteen ducal titles, and is known as the most titled individual in the history of Spain.

Like all Spanish titles, it used to descend according to male-preference cognatic primogeniture. Therefore, it was held by several women (i.e. the 2nd, 4th, 11th and 19th holders of the title). The surname of Fernández de Córdoba was retained by the 3rd duke and his sister, the 4th duchess, due being the offspring of a cousin marriage. The 5th duke, Antonio Fernández de Córdoba y Cardona was the son of Beatriz de Figueroa, a daughter of the second duchess, Elvira Fernández de Córdoba y Manrique.

Beatriz de Figueroa would regularly have had the surname Fernández de Córdoba, but she preferred de Figueroa in honour of her maternal grandmother, but her son as the 5th duke nevertheless continued the regular surname of Fernández de Córdoba. The 12th duke had the surname Osorio de Moscoso from his father, Ventura Osorio de Moscoso y Guzmán Dávila y Aragón (1707–1734 himself the 6th duke of Sanlúcar la Mayor), and the 20th and 21st dukes (since 1955) have the surname Barón, after Leopoldo Barón y Torres (1890–1952), the 21st duke of Maqueda.

	Holder	Period
Created by Ferdinand V of Castile
I	Gonzalo Fernández de Córdoba y Herrera	1507–1515
II	Elvira Fernández de Córdoba y Manrique	1515–1524
III	Gonzalo Fernández de Córdoba y Fernández de Córdoba	1524–1578
IV	Francisca Fernández de Córdoba y Fernández de Córdoba	1578–1597
V	Antonio Fernández de Córdoba y Cardona (1550–1606)	1597–1606
VI	Luis Fernández de Córdoba y Aragón	1606–1642
VII	Antonio Fernández de Córdoba y Rojas	1642–1659
VIII	Francisco Fernández de Córdoba y Pimentel	1659–1688
IX	Félix Fernández de Córdoba y Fernández de Córdoba	1688–1709
X	Francisco Fernández de Córdoba y Aragón	1709–1750
XI	Ventura Francisca Fernández de Córdoba y Aragón (1712–1768)	1750–1768
XII	Ventura Osorio de Moscoso y Fernández de Córdoba (1732–1776)	1768–1776
XIII	Vicente Joaquín Osorio de Moscoso y Guzmán (1756–1816)	1783–1816
XIV	Vicente Osorio de Moscoso y Álvarez de Toledo (1777–1837)	1816–1837
XV	Vicente Pío Osorio de Moscoso y Ponce de León (1801–1864)	1837–1864
XVI	José María Osorio de Moscoso y Carvajal (1828–1881)	1864–1881
XVII	Francisco de Asís Osorio de Moscoso y Borbón (1847–1924)	1881–1924
XVIII	Francisco Osorio de Moscoso y Jordán de Urríes (1874–1952)	1924–1952
XIX	María del Perpetuo Socorro Osorio de Moscoso y Reynoso (1899–1955)	1952–1955
XX	Leopoldo Barón y Osorio de Moscoso (1920–1974)	1955–1974
XXI	Gonzalo Barón y Gavito (b. 1948)	1974–
	Adelaida Barón y Carral (b. 1977)	(heir apparent)

== See also ==
- List of dukes in the peerage of Spain
- Grandee of Spain
