= Diego Jiménez =

Diego Jiménez may refer to:

- Diego Jiménez de Enciso (1585-1634), Spanish playwright
- Diego Jiménez (footballer, born 1979) (Diego David Jiménez Martínez), Spanish football midfielder
- Diego Jiménez (footballer, born 1986) (Diego Octavio Jiménez Villa), Mexican football defender
- Diego Jiménez (footballer, born 1988) (Diego Rafael Jiménez Hernández), Mexican football forward
- Diego Jiménez (footballer, born 1991) (Diego Jiménez López), Spanish football centre-back

== Other ==
- Diego Jiménez Torres Airport, airport in Fajardo, Puerto Rico
