= Antonio Fernández de Córdoba y Cardona =

Spanish nobleman

Spanish ambassador to the Holy See
- In office 1590–1604
- Appointed by: Philip II of Spain
- Preceded by: Juan Vich y Manrique de Lara
- Succeeded by: Juan Fernandez Pacheco

Personal details
- Born: 2 December 1550 Bellpuig, Catalonia
- Died: 6 January 1606 (aged 55) Valladolid, Spain
- Spouse: Juana de Córdoba Cardona y Aragón (m. 1578)
- Education: University of Lleida
- Noble family: Folch de Cardona
- Nickname(s): Spanish: Duque de Seso, lit. 'Duke of Good Sense'

Antonio Fernández de Córdoba y Cardona, 5th Duke of Sessa (2 December 1550 – Valladolid, 6 January 1606), was a Spanish nobleman. He held numerous titles including the 5th Duke of Sessa, 4th Duke of Soma, 3rd Duke of Baena, and 7th Count of Cabra. He served as the Spanish ambassador to the Holy See between 1590 and 1604 under Philip II and Philip III.

== Early life and family ==
Antonio Fernández de Córdoba y Cardona was born in Bellpuig, Catalonia, the second son of Beatriz Fernández de Córdoba, 4th Duchess of Sessa, and Fernando Folch de Cardona, 2nd Duke of Soma. Through his mother, he was a nephew of Gonzalo Fernández de Córdoba, 3rd Duke of Sessa and Governor of Milan. Although Beatriz would normally have borne the surname Fernández de Córdoba, she preferred to be known as Beatriz de Figueroa in honour of her maternal grandmother, whose surnames were Manrique de Lara and Figueroa. This practice of using a surname belonging to an ancestor, rather than the paternally inherited surname, was not unusual among the Spanish nobility of the time. Antonio's name was also affected by this practice. Ordinarily he would have been a Folch de Cardona, inheriting his father's surname, but his parents instead decided to give him the Fernández de Córdoba name, in memory of his famous ancestor, Gonzalo Fernández de Córdoba. His maternal lineage also connected him to Francisca Fernández de Córdoba y de la Cerda, widowed Marchioness of Gibraleón, from whom Antonio inherited several noble titles.

Raised in the family palace in Bellpuig, he studied at the University of Lleida. In the court of Madrid, he served as page to Infanta Juana of Austria Joanna of Austria, Princess of Portugal, sister of Philip II. He later accompanied his uncle Gonzalo to Italy and took part in the Tunis campaign.

== Titles and inheritance ==
Beatriz died a nun in Barcelona in 1553, and Fernando died at Naples on 13 September 1571. Antonio's only brother Luis died in March 1574. Antonio inherited the Duchy of Soma after from his brother in 1574, and received the Duchy of Sessa through his mother. Upon the death of his aunt Francisca in 1597, he also inherited the Duchy of Baena, the County of Cabra, and the Viscountcy of Iznájar, consolidating a vast network of noble titles in Spain and Italy. His full array of titles included the dukedoms of Sessa, Soma, Andria, and Santángelo; the counties of Cabra, Palamós, Oliveto, Avellino, and Trivento; the viscountcy of Iznájar; and baronies in Bellpuig, Liñola, and Calonge.

== Diplomatic career ==
In 1590, Philip II appointed Antonio ambassador to the Holy See. He arrived in Rome on 21 July 1590, during a period of strained relations between Spain and the Papacy, succeeding Juan Vich y Manrique de Lara as ambassador. Fernández de Córdoba distinguished himself with a diplomatic style characterised by prudence and moderation, earning the nickname "Duke of Good Sense" (Spanish: Duque de Seso). Contemporary chronicler Luis Cabrera de Córdoba remarked that his "prudence and gentle manner calmed the spirit of Pope Sixtus V."

As ambassador, he played a central role in supporting pro-Spanish candidates during a series of papal conclaves. Between 1590 and 1592, he was involved in the elections of Popes Urban VII, Gregory XIV, Innocent IX, and Clement VIII. His intervention in papal politics drew criticism from some Roman theologians and led to a controversy in 1593 over the legitimacy of secular influence in conclaves. Fernández de Córdoba defended the rights of the Spanish crown to promote suitable papal candidates while upholding the independence of the electors.

During the French Wars of Religion, he advocated for a stronger Papal stance against Henry of Navarre, later Henry IV of France. Tensions between the Spanish embassy and the Vatican continued until Henry's conversion and the conclusion of the Peace of Vervins in 1598.

He remained in Rome after the death of Philip II, organising his funeral in the city. Under Philip III, he retained his post and accompanied Pope Clement VIII to Ferrara in 1598, where he represented Infanta Isabella Clara Eugenia during her proxy marriage to Archduke Albert. He also attended the canonisation of Saint Raymond of Peñafort in 1601.

== Return to Spain and final years ==
In 1603, Fernández de Córdoba returned to Spain, leaving the Roman embassy after serving under five popes. He was offered several positions by Philip III, choosing to become High Steward to Queen Margaret of Austria and a member of the Council of State. He was succeeded in Rome by the Marquess of Villena. Following diplomatic tensions between Villena and Pope Clement VIII, the Vatican requested Fernández de Córdoba’s return as ambassador. However, the deaths of Clement VIII and his successor Pope Leo XI in 1605–1606 rendered the request moot. Antonio Fernández de Córdoba died in Valladolid in 1606, leaving debts totalling 80,000 ducats. He was initially buried in the Discalced Carmelite monastery in Valladolid and later reinterred in the Dominican convent in Baena.

== Marriage and children ==
Fernandez de Córdoba married his second cousin Juana de Córdoba Cardona y Aragón (1557-1615) in Torà, Catalunya, on 19 June 1578. She was the eldest daughter of Diego Fernández de Córdoba, 3rd marquis of Comares, Governor General of Oran and Mazalquivir. Her mother was Juana II Folch de Cardona, daughter of Alfonso de Aragón y Portugal, 5th Duchess of Cardona, 4th Duchess of Segorbe, countess of Ampurias, countess of Prades, marchioness of Pallars.

The marriage of Antonio and Juana produced 8 children :

- Juana Fernández de Córdoba (1580-1609), married Íñigo Fernández de Velasco, 9th Count of Haro
- Luis Fernández de Córdoba, (1582–1642), 6th Duke of Sessa, 4th Duke of Baena and many other titles, patron of the famous theatrical writer, Felix Lope de Vega. Had issue.
- Francisco Fernández de Córdoba (1583-), married his brother's daughter.
- Fernando Lorenzo Buenaventura Fernández de Córdoba (1584-), a priest.
- Gonzalo Fernández de Córdoba (1585–1635), Governor of the Duchy of Milan (1625–1629), 1st Prince of Maratea, Sicily (1624), Prince of the Holy Roman Empire (1625) by Holy Roman Emperor Ferdinand II. He was single and had no issue.
- Ramón Fernández de Córdoba (1587-1634), Comendador del Viso.
- Lorenzo Fernández de Córdoba, a priest.
- Francisca Fernández de Córdoba (died 1623), married Gómez Suárez de Figueroa, 3rd Duke of Feria, no issue.

Spanish nobility
Preceded by Beatriz Fernández de Córdoba	Duke of Sessa; 1597–1606	Succeeded by Luis Fernández de Córdoba y Aragón
Preceded by Luis Folch de Cardona y Fernández de Córdoba	Duke of Soma; 1571–1606	Succeeded by Luis Fernández de Córdoba y Aragón
Preceded by Francisca Fernández de Córdoba	Duke of Baena; 1597–1606	Succeeded by Luis Fernández de Córdoba y Aragón
