= Gonzalo Fernández de Córdoba (1520–1578) =

Spanish aristocrat (1520–1578)

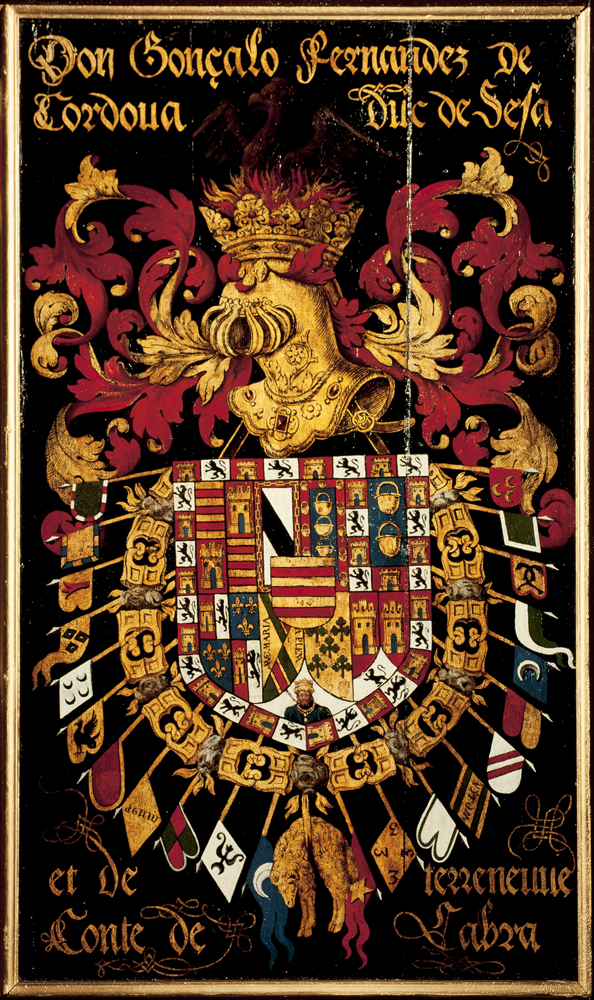
Coat of arms of Gonzalo II Fernández de Córdoba, knight of the Order of the Golden Fleece, at Ghent Cathedral

Gonzalo II Fernández de Córdoba, 3rd Duke of Sessa, 1st Duke of Baena (27 July 1520 – 3 December 1578) was a Spanish aristocrat who held several dukedoms and many other lesser titles, Spanish and Italian; he was Captain General of the Spanish Troops in Italy, Great Admiral of the Kingdom of Naples, and a member of the Spanish King Royal Council for Italy and the Royal War Council.

== Early life ==
Fernández de Córdoba was born at Cartagena on 27 July 1520. His mother, Elvira Fernández de Córdoba y Manrique, died in 1524, when he was four, in childbirth. His father, Luis Fernández de Córdoba, died in 1526, when he was six, while on campaign in Italy.

Through his mother, the eldest daughter of her father, he was the grandson of Gonzalo Fernández de Córdoba, 1st Duke of Sessa, who was Viceroy of Naples.

== Career ==
He was twice a Governor of the Duchy of Milan, first from 1558 to 1560 then from 1563 to 1564, and was made Knight 213 of the Order of the Golden Fleece in 1555.

The Lordship of Baena he had inherited from his father was converted to a dukedom by King Philip II of Spain on 19 August 1566, making Gonzalo the 1st Duke of Baena.

In 1552, he sold his title and the Duchy of Andria to Fabrizio Carafa, Count of Ruvo.

== Personal life ==
On 30 November 1538 he married at Valladolid, Spain, María Sarmiento de Mendoza, the sister of Diego de los Cobos y Hurtado de Mendoza, 1st Marquess of Camarasa, and the daughter of Úbeda-born Francisco de los Cobos, powerful Secretary of State and Financial Accountant of King Charles I of Spain, who was also Holy Roman Emperor, Charles V. There was no issue from this marriage.

Fernández de Córdoba died, without issue, in Villaviciosa de Odón on 3 December 1578.

=== Succession of titles ===
The succession to many of his titles, including the Dukedom of Sessa, Couny of Cabra and Dukedom of Baena went to his youngest sister, who had described herself until then as Francisca Fernández de Córdoba, who had married Álvaro de Zúñiga y Sotomayor, 4th Marquess of Gibraleón, 6th Count of Belalcázar (d. 1559) in 1542. (Note: This name Zúñiga belonged to her husband's mother, "Teresa de Zúñiga", who died on 25 November 1565, 2nd Marchioness of Ayamonte, Lady of Lepe and Redondela, suo jure 3rd Duchess of Béjar, 4th Countess of Bañares, 2nd Marchioness of Gibraleón. Her husband, a "Sotomayor", from Córdoba, was also a member of the nobility but not as wealthy or as important as his wife. Once more, the inherited name was not necessarily always "transmitted" by the father exclusively, things depending on personal circumstances.) When his sister Francisca died without issue in 1597, the titles passed to their nephew, Antonio Fernández de Córdoba y Cardona (1550–1606), the son of their sister Beatriz.

== Notes ==
Government offices
Preceded by Cristoforo Madruzzo	Governor of the Duchy of Milan (1st time); 1558–1560	Succeeded by Francesco Ferdinando d'Ávalos
Preceded by Francesco Ferdinando d'Ávalos	Governor of the Duchy of Milan (2nd time); 1563–1564	Succeeded by Gabriel de la Cueva, 5th Duke of Alburquerque
