= Luis Cabrera de Córdoba =

Spanish historian and writer

Luis Cabrera de Córdoba (1559–1623) was a Spanish historian and writer. His masterpiece is Historia de Felipe II. He was born in Madrid.

His poem Laurentina was written for King Philip II. Only seven of the original 29 cantos have survived, the majority of which are about San Lorenzo. The river Tagus is the protagonist of these verses describing the woods of Aranjuez and the estates and gardens located around the monastery of El Escorial. It was part of a movement of literary works that redefined the garden as an artistic endeavor. Córdoba was the son of the superintendent of the monastery gardens.
