= Elvira Fernández de Córdoba =

Spanish noblewoman

Elvira Fernández de Córdoba y Manrique de Figueroa (c. 1500 – 1524) was a Spanish noblewoman, the only surviving daughter of Gonzalo Fernández de Córdoba (d. 1515), a Spanish general involved with the Italian Wars and viceroy of Naples from 1503 to 1507, and his second wife Maria Manrique de Lara y Espinoza (d. 1527).

In 1518 she married a cousin, Luis Fernández de Córdoba. Elvira died quite young in childbirth in 1524, and her husband shortly after, in 1526, on campaign in Italy. She is of some importance for the genealogy of the Grandees of Spain as she inherited the ducal titles created for her father by the Catholic Monarchs. She had four children, Gonzalo (1520–1578), Francisca (d. 1597), Beatriz and María. Her titles passed to Gonzalo, then to Francisca, and then to the son of Beatriz, Antonio Fernández de Córdoba y Cardona (1550–1606).
