= Diego Jiménez de Enciso =

Diego Jiménez de Enciso (1585 – 1634) was a playwright of the Spanish Golden Age.

He was much admired and praised by Miguel de Cervantes, Lope de Vega and Juan Pérez de Montalbán; the last considered him a "model for those who wish to write great comedies". In his 1860 catalogue of the Spanish theatre, Cayetano Barrera gives a list of eleven plays by Enciso. Three have reached several editions, namely, "El Príncipe Don Cárlos", "La Mayor Hazaña del Emperador Cárlos Quinto", and "Los Médicis de Florencia". Of these, only "Los Médicis de Florencia" is publicly accessible, in "La Biblioteca de Autores Españoles". Enciso also wrote La Comedia Famosa de Latino, a historical drama about a formerly enslaved person that later became fluent in Latin and assimilated into Spanish society.

Enciso's idea of the historical drama is unique for a Spanish dramatist, for he seems to regard the historical drama as being capable of adhering closely to facts. He uses recognized sources in such a way as to give to his plot the appearance of probability.

In his versification Enciso shows great variety, but the hendecasyllable (eleven-syllabled verse) seems to predominate. His work as a whole is characterized by the elevated tone which pervades it, simple plots, and sonorous language.
