= Duke of Santángelo =

Dukedom of Spain

Dukedom of Santángelo
- Creation date: 10 March 1497
- Created by: Catholic Monarchs
- Peerage: Peerage of Spain
- First holder: Gonzalo Fernández de Córdoba y Enríquez de Aguilar, 1st Duke of Terranova
- Present holder: Luis María de Casanova-Cárdenas y Barón, 5th Duke of Santángelo
- Heir apparent: Baltasar Carlos de Casanova-Cárdenas y Habsburgo-Lorena, former 12th Marquess of Elche

Duke of Santángelo (Spanish: Duque de Santángelo) is a hereditary title in the Peerage of Spain, accompanied by the dignity of Grandee and granted in 1497 by the Catholic Monarchs to "El Gran Capitán" (Gonzalo Fernández de Córdoba), a general who negotiated the Surrender of Granada and led the Spanish to victory in the Italian Wars. It is a victory title, making reference to the town of Città Sant'Angelo in the Province of Pescara, Italy.

The title became extinct after the death of the 3rd Duke in 1578 and was rehabilitated in 1918 by Alfonso XIII on behalf of María de la Soledad Osorio de Moscoso, the most legitimate descendant of the last Duke and a great-grandchild of Infanta Luisa Teresa of Spain.

The current Duke, Luis María de Casanova-Cárdenas, is married to Archduchess Monika of Austria (his fifth cousin once-removed), the second child of Otto von Habsburg, crown prince of Austria, and Princess Regina of Saxe-Meiningen. They have 4 children.

== Dukes of Santángelo ==
=== 1497 ===
- Gonzalo Fernández de Córdoba y Enríquez de Aguilar, 1st Duke of Santángelo
- Elvira Fernández de Córdoba y Manrique, 2nd Duchess of Santángelo
- Gonzalo Fernández de Córdoba y Fernández de Córdoba, 3rd Duke of Santángelo

=== 1918 ===
- María de la Soledad Osorio de Moscoso y Reynoso, 4th Duchess of Santángelo
- Luis María de Casanova-Cárdenas y Barón, 5th Duke of Santángelo

== See also ==
- List of dukes in the peerage of Spain
- List of current grandees of Spain

== Bibliography ==
- Hidalgos de España, Real Asociación de (2018). Elenco de Grandezas y Títulos Nobiliarios Españoles. Ediciones Hidalguía. ISBN 978-84-94841-02-6.
