= Duke of Montalto (title) =

Dukedom of Spain

Dukedom of Montalto
- Creation date: 1 January 1507
- Created by: Ferdinand II
- Peerage: Peerage of Spain
- First holder: Gonzalo Fernández de Córdoba y Enríquez de Aguilar, 1st Duke of Montalto
- Present holder: Ricardo de Bustos y Martorell, 4th Duke of Montalto

Duke of Montalto (Spanish: Duque de Montalto) is a hereditary title in the Peerage of Spain, accompanied by the dignity of Grandee and granted in 1507 by Ferdinand II to "El Gran Capitán" (Gonzalo Fernández de Córdoba), a general who negotiated the Surrender of Granada and led the Spanish to victory in the Italian Wars. It is a victory title, making reference to the town of Montalto Uffugo in the Province of Cosenza, Italy.

After the death of the 1st Duke, Ferdinand II prohibited the inheritance and use of the Dukedoms of Montalto, Terranova and Andría and thus the title was unofficially held by some of his Italian descendants for more than 300 years. However, in 1904, Alfonso XIII formally rehabilitated the title on behalf of Ricardo de Bustos, a legitimate descendant of the 1st Duke, who legally became the 2nd Duke of Montalto.

== Dukes of Montalto ==
=== 1507 ===
- Gonzalo Fernández de Córdoba y Enríquez de Aguilar, 1st Duke of Montalto

=== 1904 ===
- Fernando de Bustos y Ruiz de Arana, 2nd Duke of Montalto
- Fernando de Bustos y Martorell, 3rd Duke of Montalto
- Ricardo de Bustos y Martorell, 4th Duke of Montalto

== See also ==
- List of dukes in the peerage of Spain
- List of current grandees of Spain
