= Duke of Terranova =

Dukedom of Spain

Dukedom of Terranova
- Creation date: 11 April 1502
- Created by: Ferdinand II
- Peerage: Peerage of Spain
- First holder: Gonzalo Fernández de Córdoba y Enríquez de Aguilar, 1st Duke of Terranova
- Present holder: Gonzalo de la Cierva y Moreno, 4th Duke of Terranova

Duke of Terranova (Spanish: Duque de Terranova) is a hereditary title in the Peerage of Spain, accompanied by the dignity of Grandee and granted in 1502 by Ferdinand II to "El Gran Capitán" (Gonzalo Fernández de Córdoba), a general who negotiated the Surrender of Granada and led the Spanish to victory in the Italian Wars. It is a victory title, making reference to the town of Terranova Sappo Minulio in the province of Reggio Calabria, Italy.

After the death of the 1st Duke, Ferdinand II prohibited the inheritance and use of the Dukedoms of Terranova, Andría and Montalto and thus the title was unofficially held by some of his Italian descendants for more than 300 years. However, on 22 July 1893, Alfonso XIII formally rehabilitated the title on behalf of Alfonso Osorio de Moscoso, a more legitimate descendant who legally became the 2nd Duke of Terranova.

== Dukes of Terranova ==
=== 1502 ===
- Gonzalo Fernández de Córdoba y Enríquez de Aguilar, 1st Duke of Terranova

=== 1893 ===
- Alfonso Osorio de Moscoso y Osorio de Moscoso, 2nd Duke of Terranova
- María Rafaela Osorio de Moscoso y López, 3rd Duchess of Terranova
- Gonzalo de la Cierva y Moreno, 4th Duke of Terranova

== See also ==
- List of dukes in the peerage of Spain
- List of current grandees of Spain
