= Duke of Andría =

Dukedom of Spain

Dukedom of Andría
- Creation date: 1507
- Created by: Ferdinand II
- Peerage: Peerage of Spain
- First holder: Gonzalo Fernández de Córdoba y Enríquez de Aguilar, 1st Duke of Andría
- Present holder: María Teresa Roca de Togores y Bustos, 4th Duchess of Andría

Duke of Andría (Spanish: Duque de Andría) is a hereditary title in the Peerage of Spain, accompanied by the dignity of Grandee and granted in 1507 by Ferdinand II to "El Gran Capitán" (Gonzalo Fernández de Córdoba), a general who negotiated the Surrender of Granada and led the Spanish to victory in the Italian Wars. It is a victory title, making reference to the town of Andria in the Province of Bari, Italy.

After the death of the 1st Duke, Ferdinand II prohibited the inheritance and use of the Dukedoms of Andría, Terranova and Montalto and thus the title was unofficially held by some of his Italian descendants for more than 300 years. However, in 1904, Alfonso XIII formally rehabilitated the title on behalf of José Alfonso de Bustos, a legitimate descendant of the 1st Duke, who legally became the 2nd Duke of Andría.

== Dukes of Andría ==
=== 1507 ===
- Gonzalo Fernández de Córdoba y Enríquez de Aguilar, 1st Duke of Andría (1453-1515)

=== 1904 ===
- José Alfonso de Bustos y Ruiz de Arana, 2nd Duke of Andría (1883-1940), direct descendant of the 1st Duke
- María Teresa de Bustos y Figueroa, 3rd Duchess of Andría (1914-2008), niece of the 2nd Duke
- María Teresa Roca de Togores y Bustos, 4th Duchess of Andría (b. 1938), daughter of the 3rd Duchess

== See also ==
- List of dukes in the peerage of Spain
- List of current grandees of Spain
