= Gonzalo Fernández de Córdoba =

Spanish general and statesman (1453–1515)

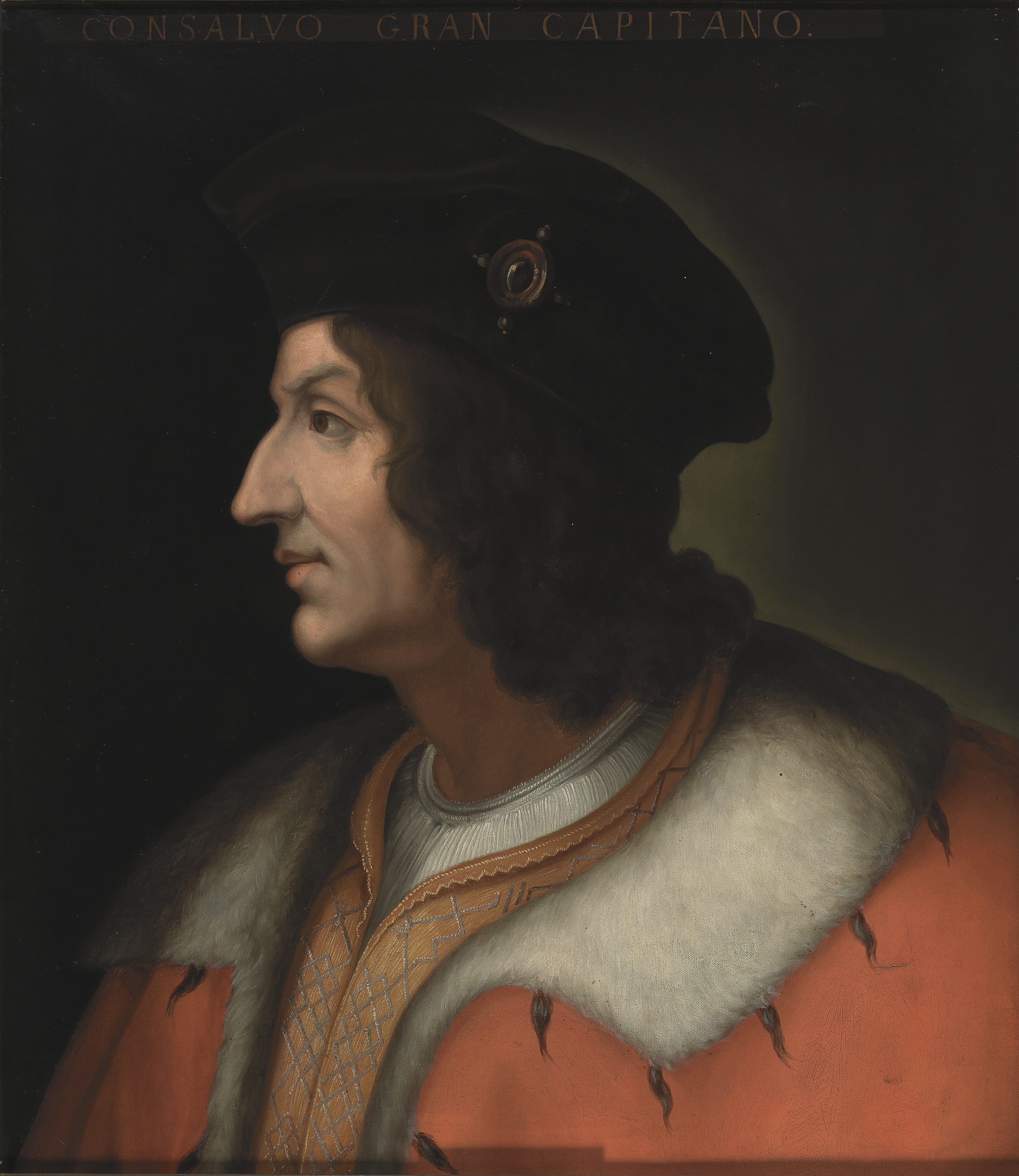
- Posthumous portrait, 1877
- Born: 1 September 1453; Montilla, Spain
- Died: 2 December 1515 (aged 62); Granada, Spain
- Military career
- Allegiance: Spain
- Service years: 1482–1504
- Rank: General
- Nickname: El Gran Capitán ("The Great Captain")
- Conflicts: War of the Castilian Succession; Granada War; 1st Italian War; Seminara (1495); Atella (1496); Ostia (1497); 3rd Turkish-Venetian War; Kefalonia (1500); 2nd Italian War; Ruvo (1503); Cerignola (1503); Garigliano (1503)
- Other work: Viceroy of Naples (1504–1507)

Gonzalo Fernández de Córdoba (1 September 1453 – 2 December 1515) was a Spanish general and statesman. He led military campaigns during the Conquest of Granada and the Italian Wars, after which he served as Viceroy of Naples. For his extensive political and military success, he was made Duke of Santángelo (1497), Terranova (1502), Andría, Montalto and Sessa (1507), and earned the nickname El Gran Capitán ("The Great Captain").

Held as one of the greatest generals in history, he became the first European to decisively employ firearms on the battlefield, and among the first to reorganize infantry with pikes and firearms. His extensive combined arms doctrine, which led to the formation of the tercios after his death, were instrumental in making the Spanish army the dominant land force in Europe for over a century and a half. He has been credited with marking the transition between medieval and modern warfare, leaving a lasting influence in military thinking up to the 20th century.

Córdoba rose to international prestige during his career in the Italian Wars, maintaining active relationships not only with the crowns of Castile and Aragon, but also with France, the Papal States, the Italian city-states and the Holy Roman Empire, all of which sought out his services. Chronicler Jerónimo Zurita went to consider him "...the most esteemed person that lived in these times, for such princes, either desired to have him for a friend, or were wary that he might become their enemy."

== Early life ==
Gonzalo Fernández de Córdoba was born on 1 September 1453 at Montilla in the province of Córdoba. He was the younger son of Pedro Fernández de Córdoba, Count of Aguilar (himself the son of Pedro Fernández de Córdoba, 1390–1424 and of Leonor de Arellano) and of Elvira de Herrera (daughter of Pedro Núñez de Herrera y Guzmán, d. 1430, and Blanca Enríquez de Mendoza). In 1455, when Gonzalo was two years old, his father died. His older brother, Alonso, inherited all of their father's estates, leaving Gonzalo to seek his own fortune. In 1467, Gonzalo was first attached to the household of Alfonso, Prince of Asturias, the half-brother of King Henry IV of Castile. After Alfonso died in 1468, Gonzalo devoted himself to Alfonso's sister, Isabella of Castile.

When King Henry IV died in 1474, Isabella proclaimed herself a successor as queen, disputing the right of Juana la Beltraneja (the king's 13-year-old daughter and her niece) to ascend the throne. During the ensuing civil war between the followers of Isabella and Juana, there was also conflict with Portugal since King Afonso V of Portugal sided with his niece Juana. Gonzalo fought for Isabella under Alonso de Cárdenas, grand master of the Order of Santiago. In 1479, he fought in the final battle against the Portuguese by leading 120 lancers. Cárdenas praised him for his service. When the war ended, Isabella and her husband Ferdinand were the rulers of Castile and Aragon.

== Conquest of Granada ==
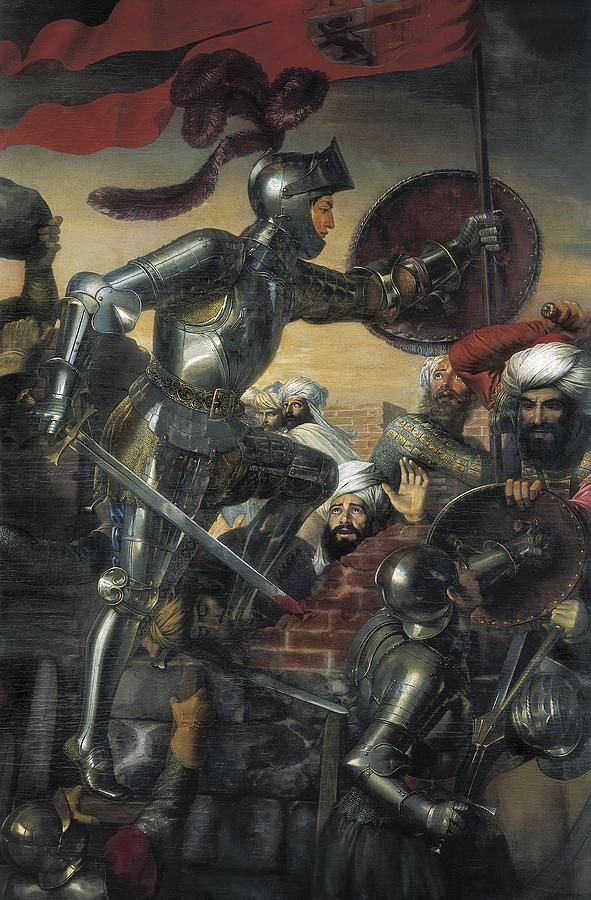
El Gran Capitán battling the Moors at the Siege of Montefrío by José de Madrazo, 1838

Once the Catholic Monarchs had consolidated their rule, they embarked in 1481 on a ten-year campaign to conquer Granada, the last remaining Muslim stronghold on the Iberian peninsula. Fernández de Córdoba was an active participant in the fighting and distinguished himself as a brave and competent military leader. He gained renown for participation in the sieges of several walled towns including Loja, Tajara, Illora, and Montefrío. At Montefrío he was reported to be the first attacker over the walls. In 1492, Fernández de Córdoba captured the city of Granada, bringing an end to the war. The skills of a military engineer and a guerilla fighter were equally useful. Because of his knowledge of Arabic and his familiarity with Boabdil, Gonzalo was chosen as one of the officers to arrange the surrender.

For his service he was rewarded with an Order of Santiago, an encomienda, the manor of Órgiva in Granada as well as silk production rights in the region.

== Italian campaigns ==
Gonzalo was an important military commander during the Italian Wars, holding command twice and earning the name "The Great Captain".

=== First Italian War ===
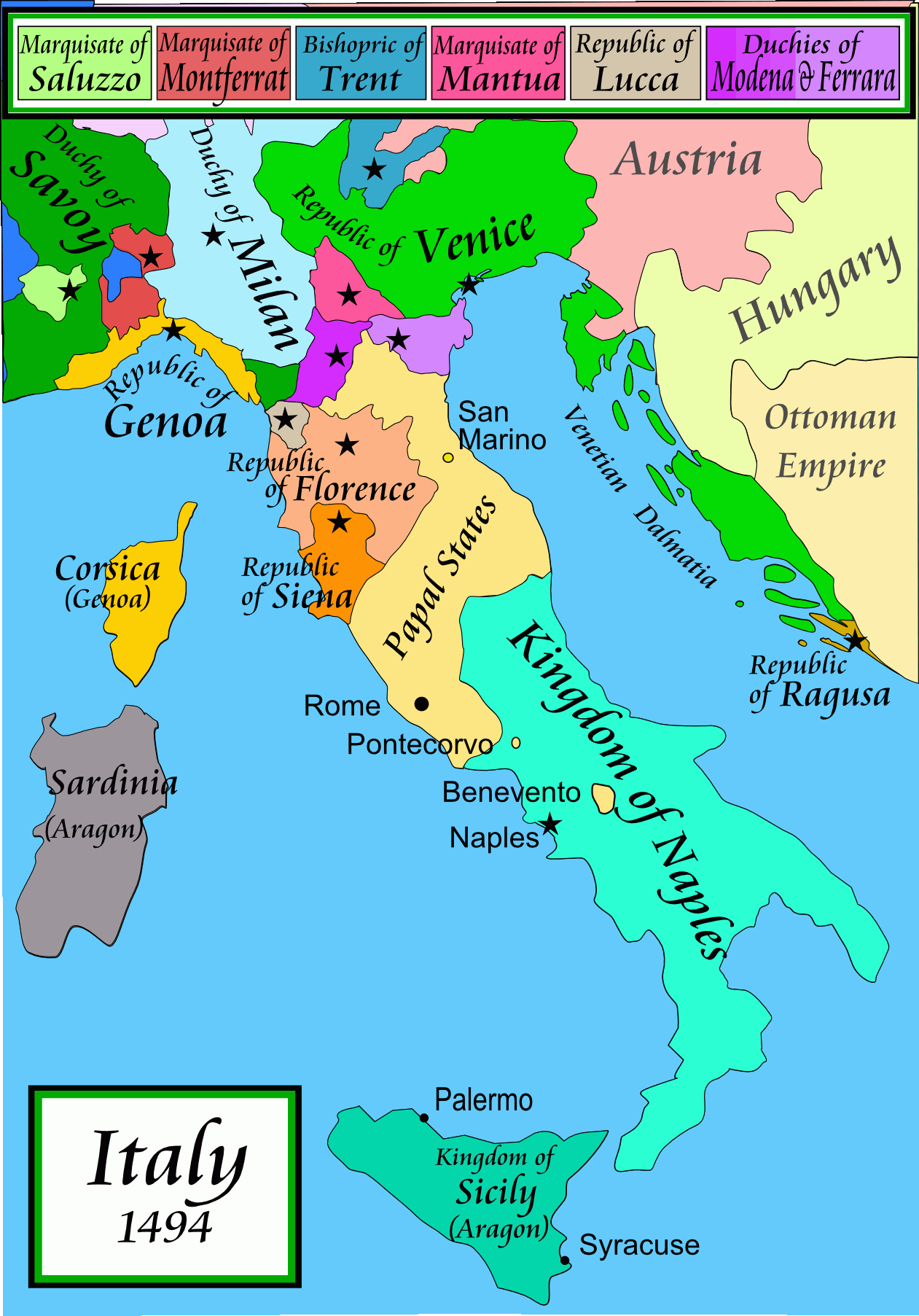
Italy in 1494, when Frederick IV of Naples took power as the second inheriting son of Ferdinand I of Naples

The Italian Wars began in 1494 when Charles VIII of France marched into Italy with 25,000 men to make good his claim to the Kingdom of Naples ruled by Ferdinand II, a cousin to Ferdinand of Aragon. The French easily overwhelmed the Neapolitan defenses and on 12 May 1495 Charles had himself crowned Emperor of Naples. The Catholic Monarchs were anxious to reverse French success in Naples and selected Fernández de Córdoba to lead an expeditionary force against Charles. Fernández de Córdoba landed in Naples shortly after Charles' coronation with a force of about 5,000 infantry and 600 light cavalry. Fearful of being trapped in Italy, Charles installed Gilbert de Bourbon as Viceroy of Naples and returned to France with about half of the French forces.

Initially, the light infantry and cavalry under Fernández de Córdoba command were no match against the heavily armed French. A lack of training and poor coordination between Spanish and Italian forces compounded the problem. In their first major engagement on 28 June 1495, Fernández de Córdoba was defeated at the Battle of Seminara against French forces led by Bernard Stewart d'Aubigny. After the defeat, Fernández de Córdoba withdrew to implement a rigorous training program and reorganize his army. The Spanish employed effective guerrilla tactics, striking quickly to disrupt French supply lines and avoiding large-scale battles. Gradually Fernández de Córdoba regained a foothold in the country and then assaulted the French-occupied Italian cities. Within a year, Fernández de Córdoba achieved a decisive victory at Atella, capturing the French viceroy and expelling the remaining French forces from Naples. He also recovered the Roman port of Ostia and returned the captured territories to the Italians by 1498.

=== Military restructuring ===
When Fernández de Córdoba returned to Spain he drew on the lessons from the Italian campaign to restructure the Spanish forces and military strategy. In the open field, the loose formation and short swords of the Spanish infantry were unable to withstand a charge of heavy cavalry and infantry armed with pikes. To overcome this weakness, Fernández de Córdoba introduced a new infantry formation armed with pikes and a heavy, shoulder-fired gun called an arquebus. To increase tactical flexibility he assigned different sections of his forces to specific roles, rather than using them as one general force. These new sections could maneuver more independently and act with greater flexibility.

=== Second Italian War ===
After Louis XII succeeded Charles as king of France in 1498, he quickly declared his intention to re-invade Italy and once again seize Naples. To buy time, Spain negotiated the Treaty of Granada with France in 1500, agreeing to partition Naples between the two countries. Fernández de Córdoba returned to Italy leading a large force on the pretext of joining with France and Venice to attack the Ottomans in the Ionian Sea. For a time Fernández de Córdoba did fight the Turks, seizing the strongly held island of Cephalonia in December 1500 after a two-month siege.

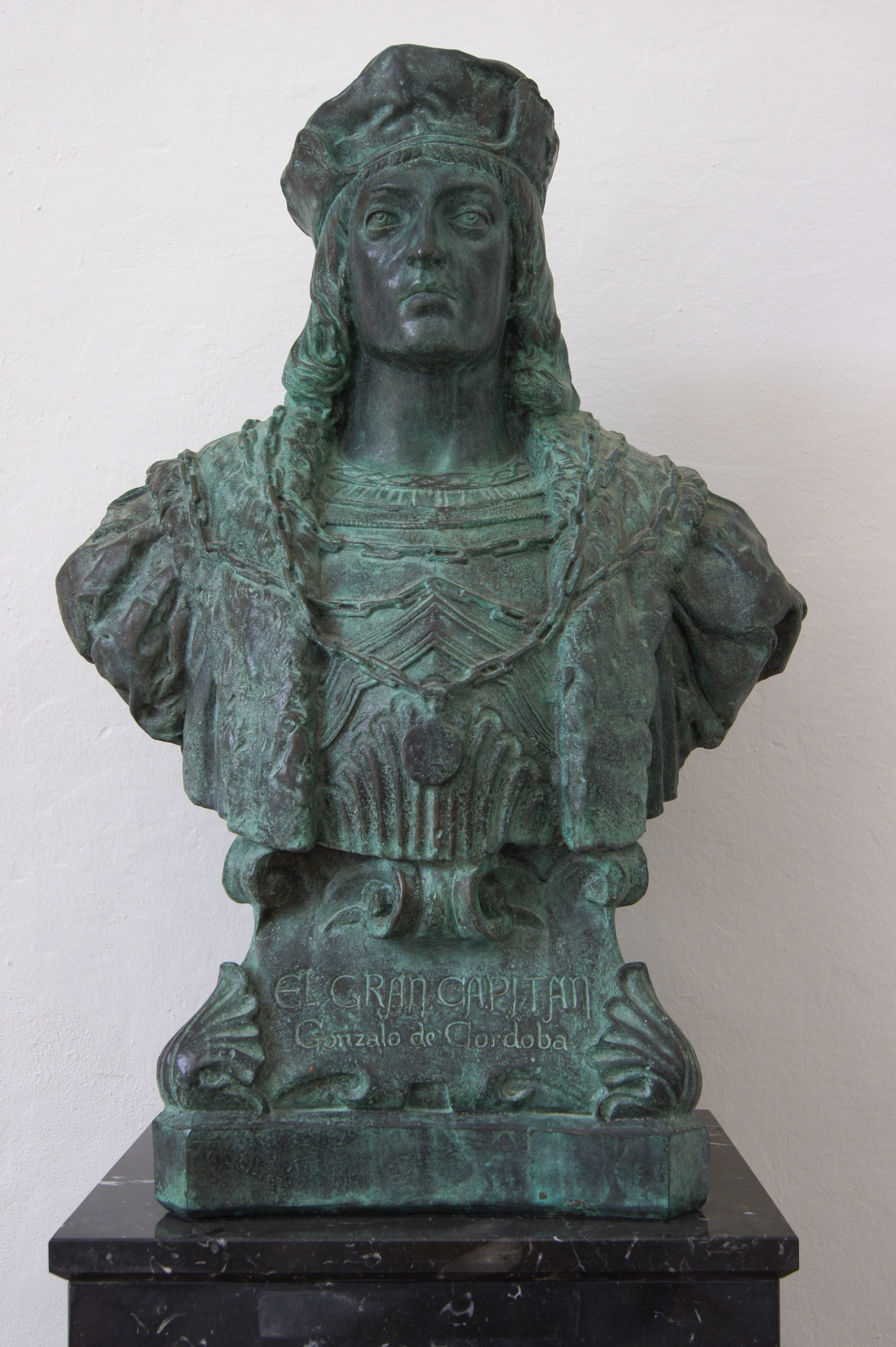
Bronze bust of Gonzalo Fernández de Córdoba, Alcázar de los Reyes Cristianos

Fernández de Córdoba returned to Naples and after Frederick IV abdicated, the French and Spanish fought a guerilla war while negotiating the partition of the kingdom. Spain was outnumbered and besieged in Barletta by the French. Gonzalo refused to be drawn into a full-scale battle until he received sufficient reinforcements.

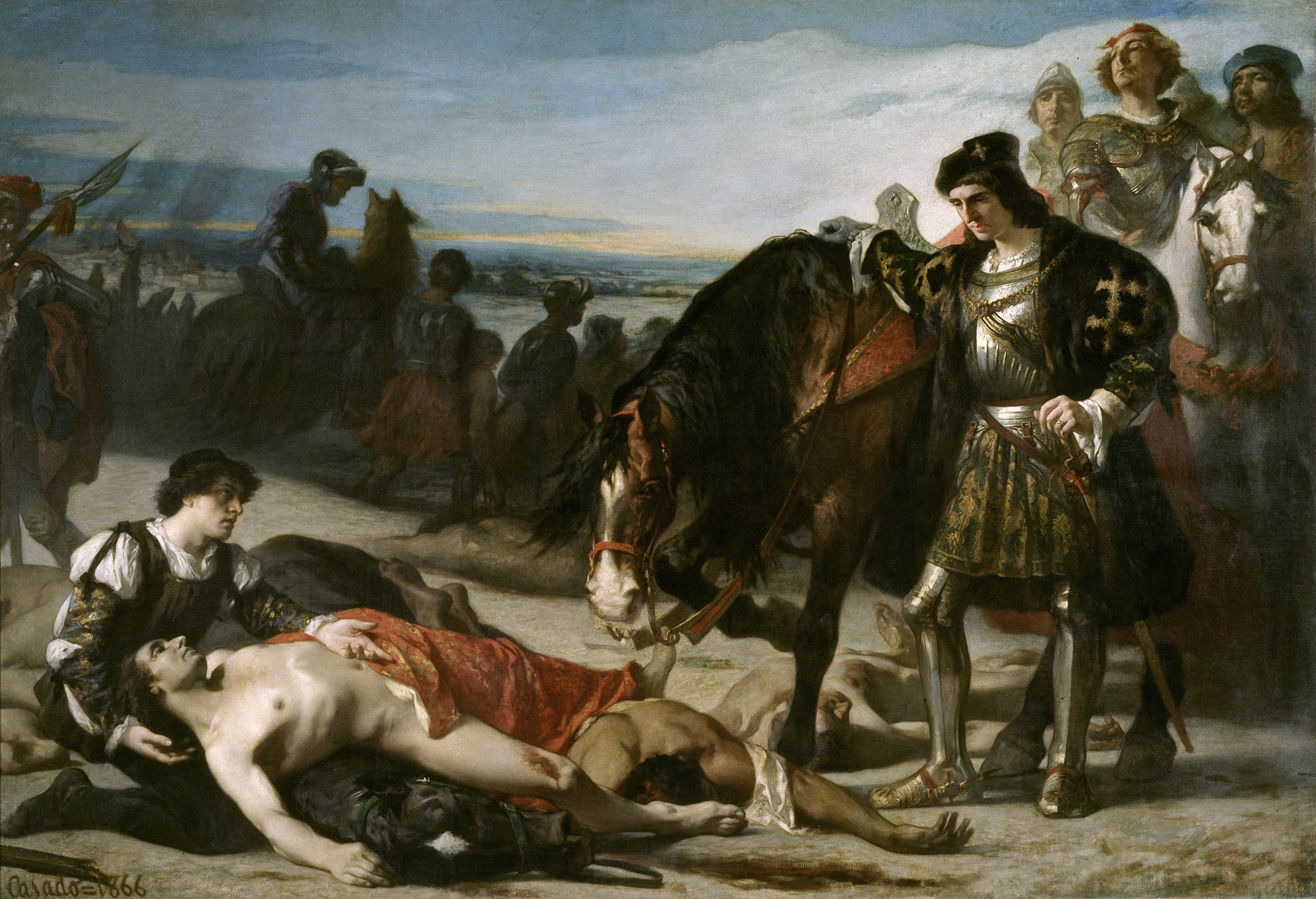
Gonzalo Fernández de Córdoba gazes upon d'Armagnac's lifeless body at the Battle of Cerignola, by Casado del Alisal, 1866

When his army was adequately reinforced, Fernández de Córdoba engaged the French on 28 April 1503 at the Battle of Cerignola where 6,000 Spanish troops faced a French army of 10,000. Gonzalo formed his infantry into units called coronelías with pikemen tightly packed in the center and arquebusiers and swordsmen on the flanks. The French unsuccessfully attacked the front and were assailed by gunfire coming from the flanks. The French commander, the Louis d'Armagnac, Duke of Nemours, was killed early in the battle. After withstanding two French charges, Fernández de Córdoba, El Gran Capitán, went on the offensive and drove the French off the field. This was the first time in history that a battle had been won largely through the strength of firearms.

Fernández de Córdoba occupied the city of Naples and pushed the French forces back across the Garigliano River. Separated by the river, a stalemate ensued with neither side able to make progress. But Fernández de Córdoba strung together a pontoon bridge and stole across the river on the night of 29 December 1503. The French, commanded by Ludovico II of Saluzzo, had assumed the rain-swollen river was impassable and were taken by complete surprise. Fernández de Córdoba and his army decisively defeated the French with their formations of pikes and arquebuses. Fernández de Córdoba continued to pursue the French and captured the Italian city of Gaeta in January 1504. Unable to mount a defense after these losses, the French were allowed to evacuate Italy by sea and forced to sign the Treaty of Blois in 1505, relinquishing their hold on Naples.

== Viceroy of Naples ==
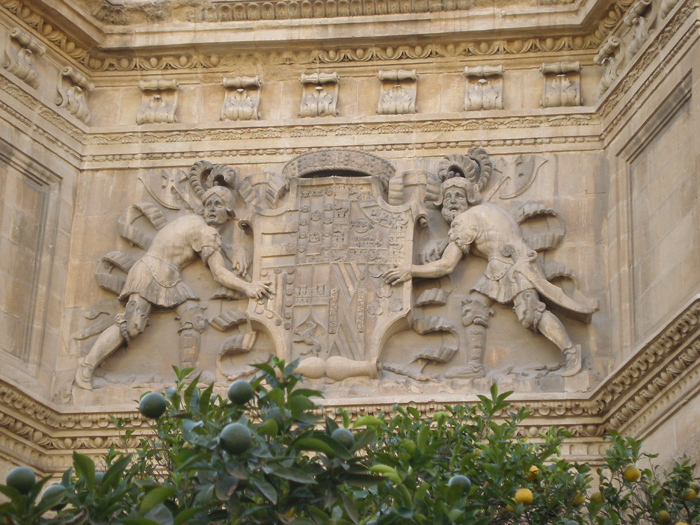
Coat of arms on the wall of the monastery church of San Jerónimo in Granada.

When the French were driven out of Naples, Fernández de Córdoba was made Duke of Terranova and appointed Viceroy of Naples in 1504. Later that same year Queen Isabel I of Castile died, depriving him of his most ardent supporter. Isabel's death also effectively pushed her husband, Ferdinand II of Aragon, out of power temporarily in Castile and forced him to defend his interests in Aragon. Naples was an Aragonese kingdom but Gonzalo was a Castilian and widely popular. As a result, Ferdinand suspected his loyalty and also felt that Gonzalo spent too freely from the treasury. In 1507 Ferdinand traveled to Naples, removed him from office and ordered him to return to Spain with a promise that he would be installed as master of the Order of Santiago, a powerful and prestigious position.

Although Fernández de Córdoba was awarded the additional title, Duke of Sessa, he never received the promised appointment to lead the Santiago military order. Ferdinand continued to praise him but gave him nothing else to do; he eventually retired to one of his country estates. Fernández de Córdoba died of malaria on 2 December 1515 at his villa near Granada at age 62.

== Legacy ==
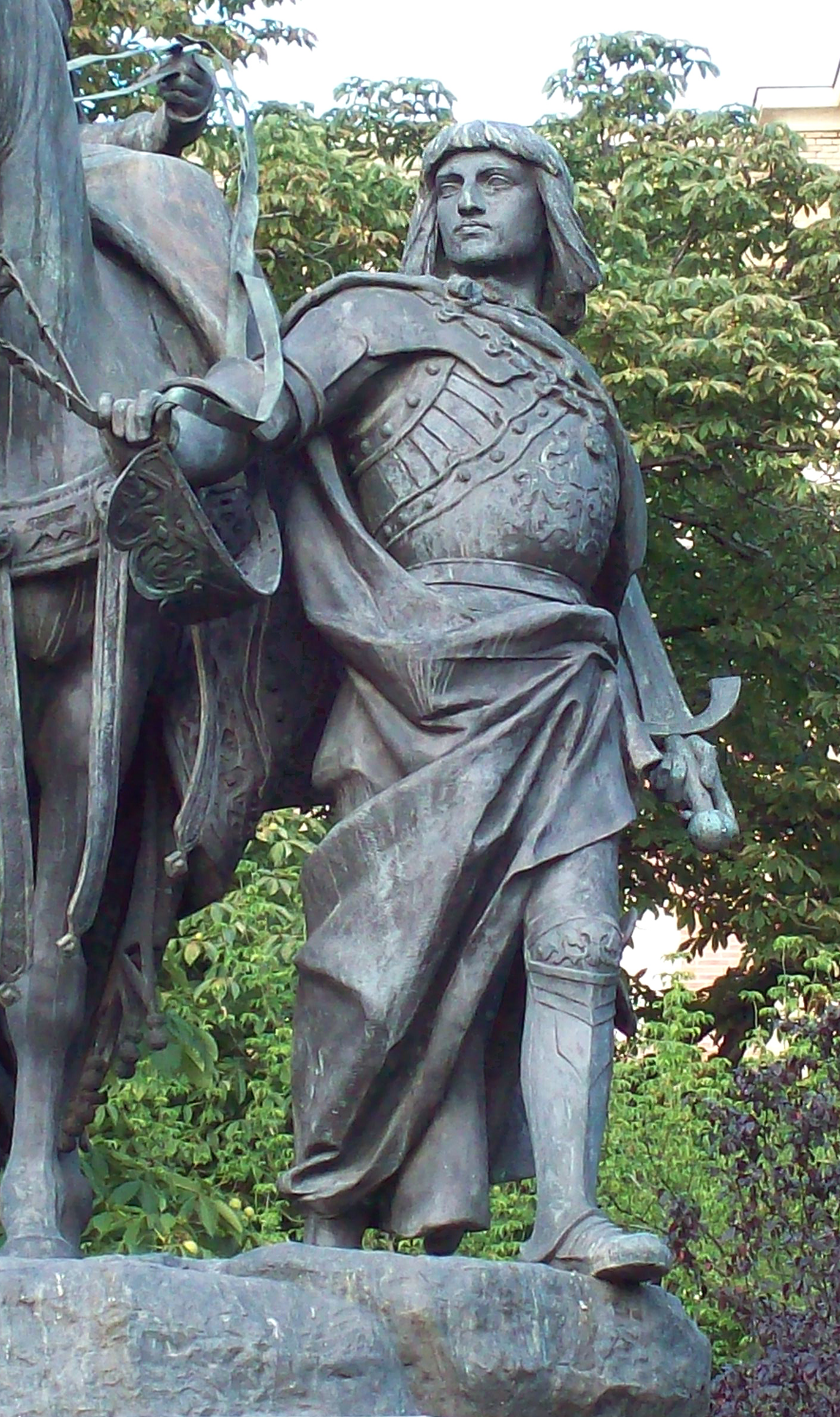
Statue of Gonzalo Fernández de Córdoba in Madrid (Manuel Oms, 1883)

Córdoba is considered one of the greatest and most influential generals in history, often credited with marking the transition between medieval and modern warfare. He was the first European to decisively employ firearms on the battlefield, and among the first to reorganize the infantry with pikes and firearms in effective defensive and offensive formations. British Field Marshal, and military historian, Bernard Montgomery credited Córdoba with raising infantrymen to the "most important fighting m[e]n on the battlefield," for the next 400 years. Córdoba also owed his victories to his usage of combined arms, coordinating fields as disparate as cavalry, artillery, fortifications, guerrilla, siegecraft and diplomacy.

He set the foundations for the creation of the tercios after his death, making Spanish land armies dominant in Europe for more than a century and half. His line of military thinking, sometimes known as the "Hispano-Italian School", was inherited by many successful Spanish and Italian commanders in the service of Spain up to the 17th century. The school included eminently Prospero Colonna and Fernando d'Ávalos, as well as Francisco Pizarro, Antonio de Leyva, Ferrante Gonzaga, Andrea Doria, Emmanuel Philibert of Savoy, Fernando Álvarez de Toledo and Alexander Farnese. Niccolò Machiavelli also showed influence from Córdoba in his 1515 work The Art of War. In the 19th century, Arthur Wellesley, Duke of Wellington cited Córdoba's craft as an inspiration to build the Lines of Torres Vedras.

His tomb in the Monastery of San Jerónimo of Granada, was decorated with some 700 captured enemy banners as war trophies. In 1810, during the Peninsular War, Córdoba's tomb was desecrated by Napoleonic troops, under the command of the Corsican General Sebastiani, mutilating the remains and burning the banners. Stone from the tower was used to build the Puente Verde bridge over the Genil. The monastery was fully restored at the end of the 19th century.

== Marriage and family ==
Fernández de Córdoba first married in 1474 to his cousin María de Sotomayor; about a year later she died giving birth to a stillborn son. On 14 February 1489 he married María Manrique de Lara y Figueroa (also known as María Manrique de Lara y Espinosa, d. 1527) from a powerful and wealthy noble family. His only surviving daughter, Elvira Fernández de Córdoba y Manrique, would inherit all his titles upon his death in 1515.

He left no sons, and was succeeded in his dukedoms by daughter Elvira Fernández de Córdoba y Manrique. María Cerezo, who married Amerigo Vespucci, was alleged to be an illegitimate daughter to Fernández de Córdoba too. His burial place in the Monastery of San Jerónimo in Granada, was built in Renaissance style. His remains were transferred there in 1552. Elvira and María, dead in 1524 and 1527 respectively, were also buried there, along with a number of other family members.

== Notes ==
Spanish nobility
New title New creation by Isabella I and Ferdinand V	Duke of Santángelo; 10 March 1497 – 2 December 1515	Succeeded by Elvira Fernández de Córdoba y Manrique as duchess
New title New creation by Isabella I and Ferdinand V	Duke of Terranova; 1502 – 2 December 1515	Succeeded by Elvira Fernández de Córdoba y Manrique as duchess
New title New creation by Ferdinand II of Aragon	Duke of Andría; 1507 – 2 December 1515	Succeeded by Elvira Fernández de Córdoba y Manrique as duchess
New title New creation by Ferdinand II of Aragon	Duke of Montalto; 1507 – 2 December 1515	Succeeded by Elvira Fernández de Córdoba y Manrique as duchess
New title New creation by Ferdinand II of Aragon	Duke of Sessa; 1507 – 2 December 1515	Succeeded by Elvira Fernández de Córdoba y Manrique as duchess
