= Fernando Álvarez de Toledo, 6th Duke of Alba =

Spanish nobleman

The Most Excellent Fernando Álvarez de Toledo 6th Duke of Alba, GE
- Born: Fernando Álvarez de Toledo y Mendoza; August 5, 1595
- Died: October 7, 1667 (aged 72)
- Spouse(s): Antonia Enríquez de Ribera y Portocarrero, 4th Marchioness of Villanueva del Río
- Children: Antonio Álvarez de Toledo, 7th Duke of Alba
- Parents: Antonio Álvarez de Toledo, 5th Duke of Alba (father); Mencia de Mendoza (mother)

Fernando Álvarez de Toledo y Mendoza, 6th Duke of Alba, Grandee of Spain, was a Spanish nobleman who was the 6th Duke of Alba from 1639 until his death in 1667.

== Biography ==
Fernando Álvarez de Toledo y Mendoza was the son of Antonio Álvarez de Toledo, 5th Duke of Alba and his wife, Mencia de Mendoza, daughter of Íñigo López de Mendoza y Mendoza, 5th Duke of the Infantado. He was the great-grandson of Fernando Álvarez de Toledo, known as the Iron Duke or Grand Duke of Alba.

The Duke did not play a primary role in the political scene of Spain during his life. Like his ancestors, he was a patron of writers and artists, such as Pedro Calderón de la Barca, who served under Fernando from 1645 to 1648.

He first married Antonia Enríquez de Ribera y Portocarrero, daughter of the 3rd Marquess of Villanueva del Río in Madrid. Antonia later inherited the Marquisate of Villanueva del Río, resulting in the Álvarez de Toledo family of Seville inheriting the possessions of the Marquesses of Villanueva del Río, including the Palacio de las Dueñas. They had one child:

- Antonio Álvarez de Toledo, 7th Duke of Alba (1615–1690), the successor to the Dukedom of Alba de Tormes and the Marquisate of Villanueva del Río, among other titles.

His second wife was Catalina Pimental, a daughter of the Count of Luna.

== Titles ==
- 6th Duke of Alba, Grandee of Spain
- 4th Duke of Huéscar
- 7th Marquess of Coria
- 7th Count of Lerín
- 7th Count of Salvatierra
- 9th Constable of Navarre

Spanish nobility
Preceded by Antonio; Álvarez de Toledo y Beaumont	Duke of Alba, et cetera 1639–1667	Succeeded by Antonio; Álvarez de Toledo y Enriquez de Ribera
