= Fernando Álvarez de Toledo, 3rd Duke of Alba =

Spanish military officer, statesman and diplomat (1507–1582)

The Most Excellent Fernando Álvarez de Toledo 3rd Duke of Alba GE
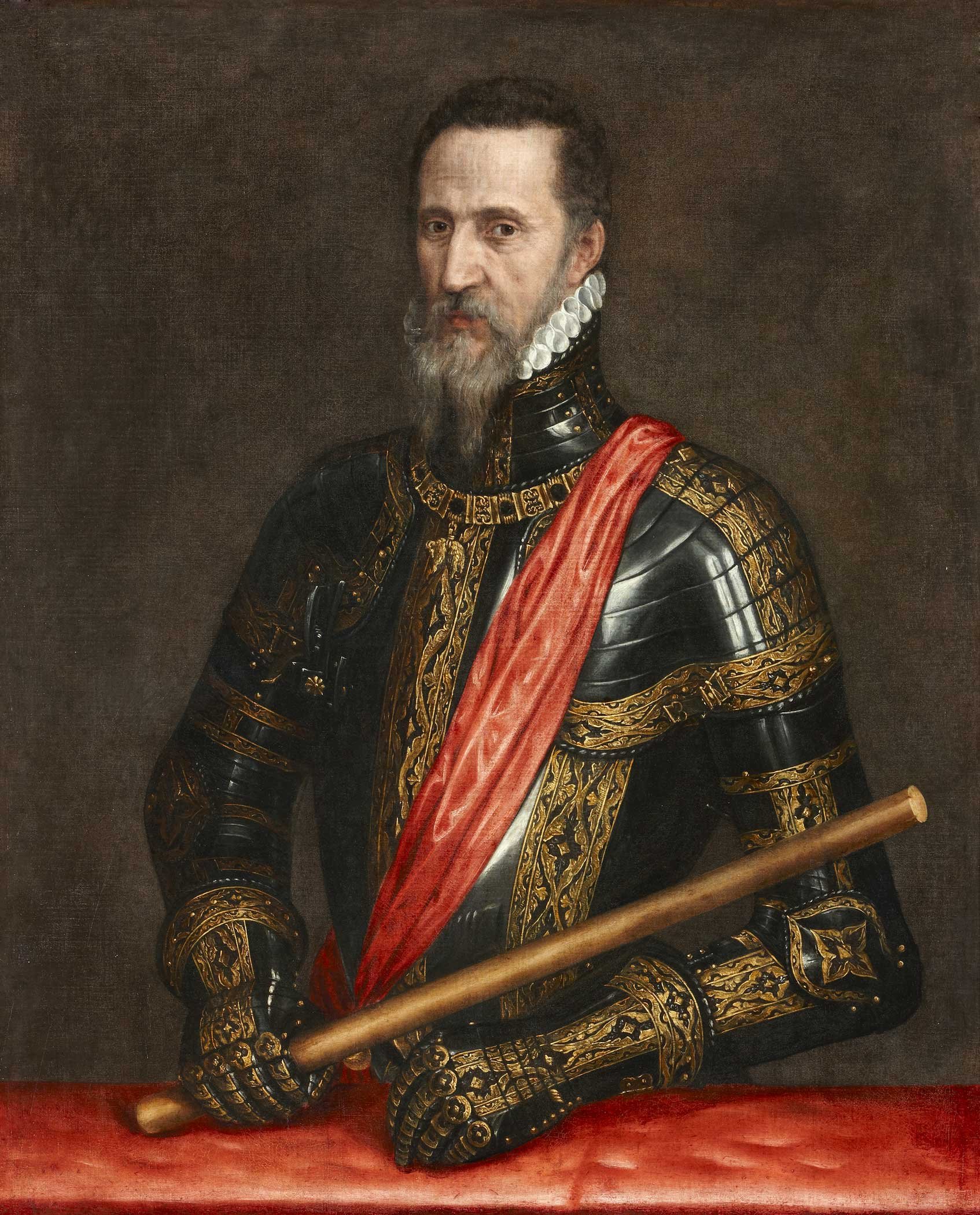
- Portrait attributed to Willem Key, 1568

12th Constable of Portugal
- In office 1581–1582
- Monarch: Philip I of Portugal
- Preceded by: John, 6th Duke of Braganza
- Succeeded by: Teodósio II, 7th Duke of Braganza

1st Viceroy of Portugal and the Algarves
- In office 18 July 1580 – 11 December 1582
- Monarch: Philip I of Portugal
- Preceded by: New title
- Succeeded by: Archduke Alberto of Austria

Governor of the Habsburg Netherlands
- In office 1567–1573
- Monarch: Philip II of Spain
- Preceded by: Margaret of Austria
- Succeeded by: Luis de Requesens y Zúñiga

Viceroy of Naples
- In office 1556–1558
- Monarch: Charles I of Spain
- Preceded by: Bernardino de Mendoza
- Succeeded by: Juan Fernández Manrique de Lara

Governor of Milan
- In office 1555–1556
- Monarch: Charles I of Spain
- Preceded by: Ferdinando Gonzaga
- Succeeded by: Cristoforo Madruzzo

Personal details
- Born: Fernando Álvarez de Toledo y Pimentel; 29 October 1507 Piedrahíta, Kingdom of Castille
- Died: 11 December 1582 (aged 75) Lisbon, Iberian Union, Spanish Empire, modern day Portugal
- Spouse: María Enríquez de Toledo y Guzmán
- Children: Fernando de Toledo; García Álvarez de Toledo y Enríquez de Guzmán; Fadrique Álvarez de Toledo y Enríquez de Guzman; Diego Álvarez de Toledo y Enríquez de Guzmán; Beatriz Álvarez de Toledo y Enríquez de Guzmán
- Parent: Garcia Álvarez de Toledo y Zuniga (Father) Beatriz Pimentel y Pacheco (Mother)
- Profession: Soldier; diplomat; statesman
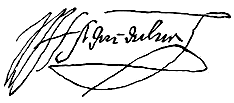
- Signature

Military service
- Allegiance: (Spain) Spanish Crown
- Rank: Captain General
- Battles/wars: Four Years' War: Siege of Fuenterrabía; Ottoman–Habsburg wars: Conquest of Tunis; Algiers expedition (1541); Italian Wars: Siege of Perpignan; Spanish invasion of Rome; Schmalkaldic War: Battle of Mühlberg; Siege of Wittenberg; Dutch Revolt: Battle of Jemmingen; Battle of Jodoigne; Siege of Mons; War of the Portuguese Succession: Battle of Alcântara

Fernando Álvarez de Toledo y Pimentel, 3rd Duke of Alba (29 October 1507 – 11 December 1582), known as the Grand Duke of Alba (Spanish: Gran Duque de Alba, Portuguese: Grão Duque de Alba) in Spain and Portugal and as the Iron Duke (Dutch: Ĳzeren Hertog) or shortly 'Alva' in the Netherlands and Belgium, was a Spanish military officer, statesman and diplomat.

He has often been considered the most effective general of his generation, as well as one of the greatest in history. Historian John Lothrop Motley wrote of him "no man had studied military science more deeply, or practiced it more constantly" at his day. He was a royal promoter of military action against France and Protestantism, although he also defended a moral and strategic alliance with England that never realized. Alba achieved notoriety for his role during the Eighty Years' War in the Spanish Netherlands, where his prolonged campaigns and repressive political actions caused his figure to be reviled in European history as a symbol of tyranny.

Born into a prominent Castilian military family, Alba first distinguished himself in the 1535 conquest of Tunis during the Ottoman–Habsburg Wars as part of a long conflict for predominance over the western Mediterranean Sea. He then commanded the Spanish troops at the Battle of Mühlberg (1547), where the army of Holy Roman Emperor Charles V defeated the German Protestant princes in the Schmalkaldic War. Alba was the commander-in-chief of the Spanish-Habsburg army during the Italian War of 1551–1559, and became governor of Milan in 1555 and viceroy of Naples in 1556.

In 1567, King Philip II of Spain appointed Alba governor of the Netherlands and tasked him with the suppression of Dutch rebels. Alba instituted the Council of Troubles, which led to the condemnations of thousands and came to be known as the "Council of Blood". Alba repeatedly defeated the troops of William of Orange during the first stages of the Eighty Years' War, but failed to extinguish politically the rebellion, and in 1573 he was recalled to Spain in temporary political disgrace. Alba's last military successes were in the Portuguese succession crisis of 1580, for which he was rewarded the titles viceroy and constable of Portugal. He held both titles until his death in Lisbon in 1582.

== Early years ==
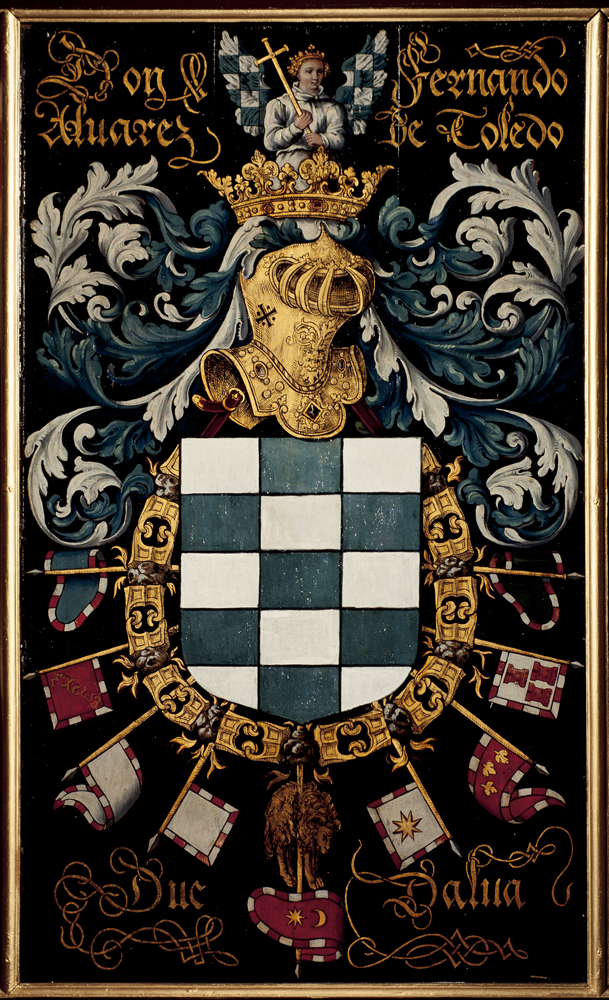
Coat of arms of the 3rd Duke of Alba.

Fernando was born in Piedrahíta, Province of Ávila, on 29 October 1507. He was the son of García Álvarez de Toledo y Zúñiga, heir of Fadrique Álvarez de Toledo y Enríquez de Quiñones, II Duke of Alba de Tormes, and of Beatriz Pimentel, daughter of Rodrigo Alonso Pimentel, IV Count – I Duke of Benavente and his wife, María Pacheco. Fernando was orphaned at age three when his father, García, died during a campaign in 1510 on the African island of Djerba. At the age of six, Fernando accompanied his grandfather, the second Duke of Alba, on a military mission to capture Navarre.

His youth and education were typical for Castilian nobility of the age. He was educated at the ducal court of the House of Alba, located in the Castle Palace of Alba de Tormes, by two Italian preceptors, Bernardo Gentile – a Sicilian Benedictine – and Severo Marini and by the Spanish Renaissance poet and writer Juan Boscan. He was educated in Roman Catholicism and humanism. He mastered Latin and knew French, English and German.

In 1523, when he was sixteen, he joined the troops of Constable of Castile, Íñigo Fernández de Velasco, II Duke of Frías, during the capture of Fuenterrabía, then occupied by France and Navarre. For his role in the siege, Fernando was appointed governor of Fuenterrabía.

When his grandfather Fadrique died in 1531, the ducal title passed to Fernando as the firstborn son of Garcia. Throughout his adulthood, he served the Spanish monarchs Charles I and his successor Philip II.

== Mayordomo mayor to the Spanish kings ==
In 1541 Fernando Álvarez de Toledo was named Mayordomo Mayor del Rey de España (High Steward to the King of Spain) by Charles I of Spain. Alba kept this office in court until the abdication of the monarch in 1556.

In 1546 Charles I, Grand Master, invested the Duke of Alba as knight of the Illustrious Order of the Golden Fleece.

From 1548 King Charles intensified the preparations of Prince Philip as his successor in the Spanish Monarchy, and he named Duke of Alba mayordomo mayor of his son to prepare Philip for his new role. Fernando took Philip on a tour around Europe that lasted until 1551. In 1554, Fernando accompanied Philip to England to attend his marriage to Mary I. The Duke was one of fifteen grandees of Spain who attended the ceremony in the abbey of Winchester on 25 July.

After the death of Charles, the new King Philip II maintained Alba as mayordomo mayor until the death of the Duke in 1582.

In 1563, King Philip II created the title Duke of Huéscar to be bestowed on the heir of the Dukes of Alba. Fadrique Álvarez de Toledo, son of Fernando became 1st Duke of Huéscar.

In 1566, Alba's son and heir, Fadrique, broke his promise of marriage to Magdalena de Guzman, lady of Queen Anne of Austria, which led to his arrest and imprisonment in the Castle of La Mota in Valladolid. The following year he was released so he could go to Flanders with his father to serve in the military. In 1578 Philip II ordered the case against Fadrique reopened. It was discovered that in order to avoid marriage, Fadrique had secretly married María de Toledo, daughter of García Álvarez de Toledo y Osorio, IV Marquess of Villafranca del Bierzo, using a permit issued for that purpose by his father the Duke of Alba. Fadrique was sent to prison, in the Castle of La Mota. Fernando, Duke of Alba was banished from the court for one year for "breaking the strict court protocol." The Duke went into exile in Uceda, where his secretaries Fernando de Albornoz and Esteban Ibarra likewise spent their punishment.

== Military commands ==
=== Against the Ottomans and French (1532–1542) ===
After Fernando had become the third Duke of Alba in 1532, Charles V sent him to Vienna to help defend the city against an Ottoman invasion army. No battle ensued as the Ottomans, having lost momentum due to time lost during the Siege of Güns, decided not to advance against Vienna and retreated from the field.

During this time, he was accompanied by the soldier-poet Garcilaso de la Vega throughout his travels in Europe. The special access that De La Vega had as a close companion to Alba, coupled with his skilled craft as a writer, allows the historian to delve into the deepest emotions expressed by the Duke of Alba through the poetry of De La Vega, specifically concerning the arduous travels while on a war-footing as well as the emotional longing that Alba expressed for his wife.

The Duke's first military command to engage in battle was in the conquest of Tunis. In early June 1535 at Cagliari, he embarked with the military force commanded by the Marquess of Vasto. On 14 July, the fortress of La Goleta was seized, and a week later the army took the city of Tunis which was defended by Hayreddin Barbarossa. Thus Spain regained control over the western Mediterranean Sea.

In 1542, he led the Spanish troops against the French Army, ending the siege of Perpignan. The siege was a decisive victory for Alba and one of the worst defeats of Francis I during the French offensive of 1542.

=== In Germany (1546–1547) ===
In 1547, Charles I, in his capacity as Charles V, Holy Roman Emperor engaged with the Protestant forces in the Schmalkaldic War. The Duke of Alba was in charge of Tercios, the elite Spanish ground troops during the Battle of Mühlberg on the banks of the river Elbe. A flanking attack by Alba's Tercios was largely responsible for the imperial army's decisive victory against the Elector of Saxony.

=== In Milan and Naples (1555–1559) ===
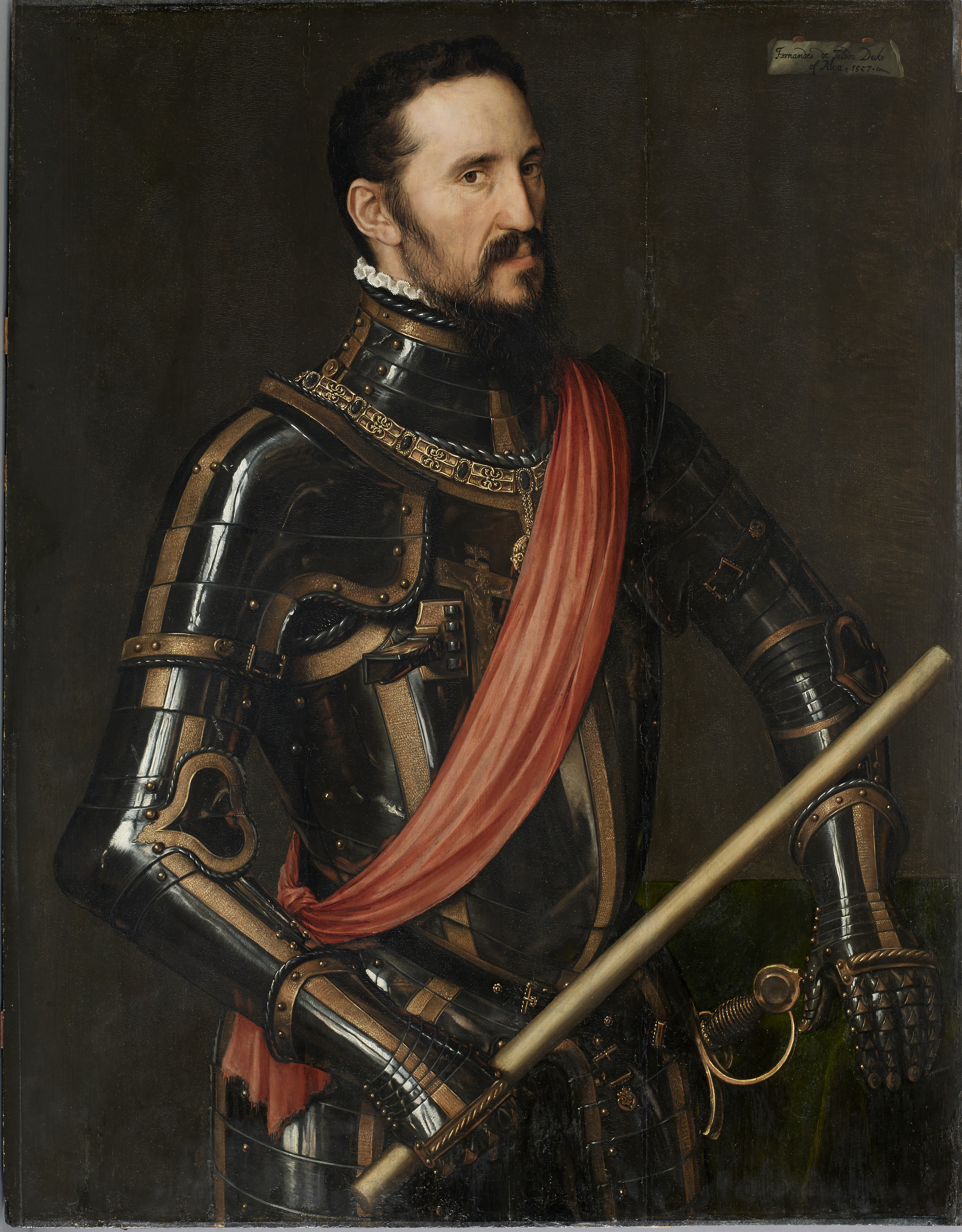
The Duke of Alba in 1549 by Anthonis Mor

In later years, the focus of conflict between France and Spain had moved to the Italian peninsula. Alba was sent to Italy as commander in chief of the Spanish-Habsburg army in Italy, and became governor of Milan in 1555, and viceroy of Naples in 1556.

The newly appointed Pope Paul IV, an enemy of the Habsburgs, prompted King Henry II of France to expel the Spanish from Italy. Papal troops joined the French for this aim. In July 1556 the Pope declared Philip II was removed from the title King of Naples. Alba did not hesitate and marched on Rome at the head of 12,000 Spanish soldiers. He financed the campaign, in part, by obtaining a loan of 430,000 ducats from Bona Sforza, dowager Queen of Poland; the loan became known as Neapolitan sums and was never repaid.

The Pope called for a truce, giving time for a French army commanded by Francis, Duke of Guise to march on Naples. Alba sat back in his positions and declined to give battle, so Guise turned towards Campli and devastated it, followed by a siege of Civitella, garrisoned by Alba. However, the siege was unsuccessful and costly for Guise, who retreated out of Naples by the arrival of Alba with an increased army from Naples. Alba and his protegee Marcantonio Colonna marched towards Rome, with Guise now being ordered back to northern Italy to protect French positions. Without French support, the papal troops were overwhelmed by the Spanish and the Duke of Alba entered Rome in September 1557. The pope had to sue for peace.

In April 1559, Alba was one of the signatories of the Treaty of Cateau-Cambrésis which ended their war with France and released Spanish resources for maximising its economic exploitation of New Spain. The Italian Peninsula entered a prolonged period of peace, sealed by marriage between the twice widowed Philip II and Isabel de Valois, daughter of Henry II of France. During the royal wedding, which was held in Paris, Alba acted as proxy for Philip.

In 1565, Alba served as a stand-in for Philip at the Bayonne Interview with King Charles IX of France, and his mother Catherine de' Medici. He was instructed by Philip to advocate for an anti-Protestant policy in France.

=== Governor of the Netherlands (1567–1573) ===
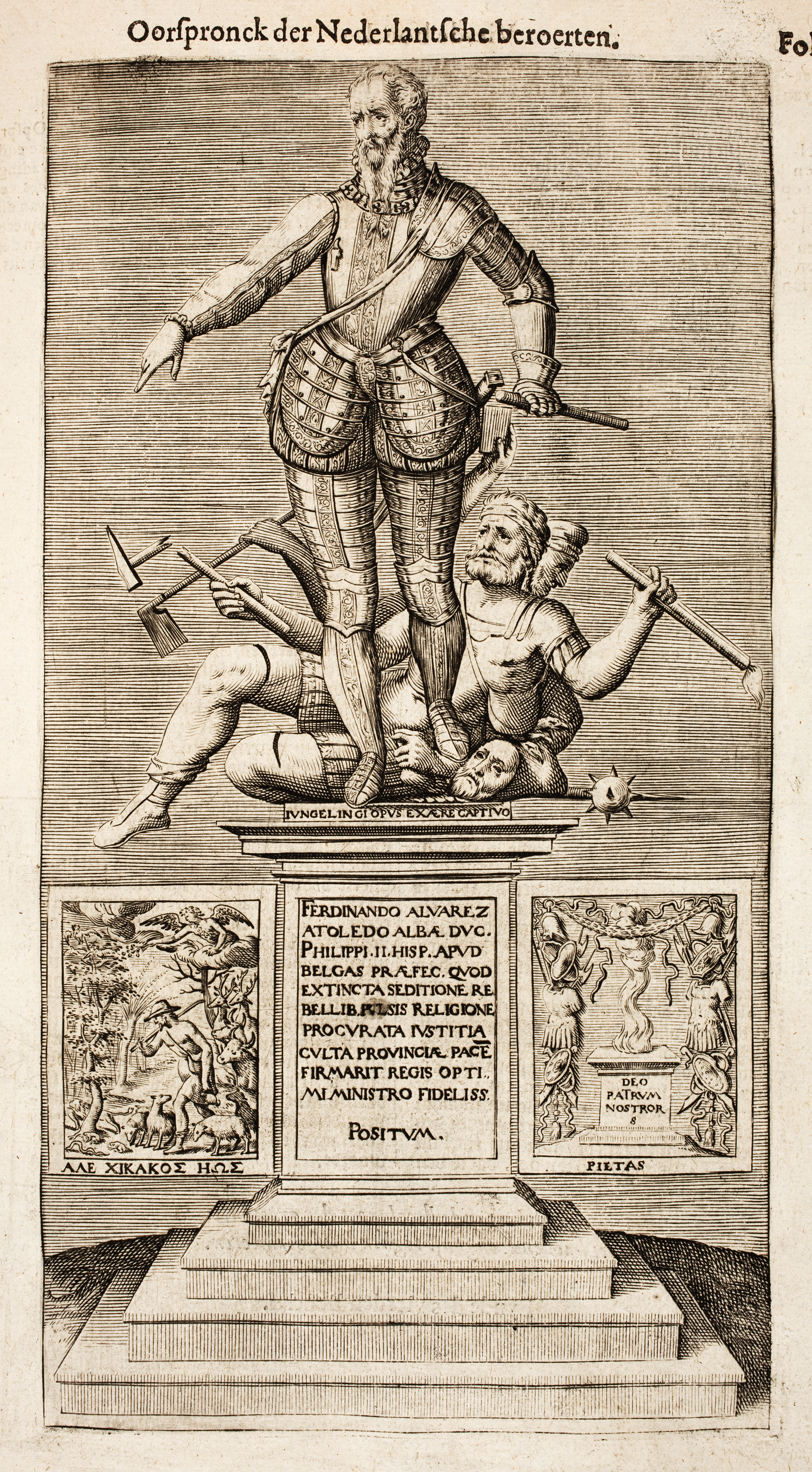
Engraving of the statue of Fernando Álvarez de Toledo in Antwerp by Jacques Jonghelinck. From Nederlantsche Oorloghen by Pieter Bor

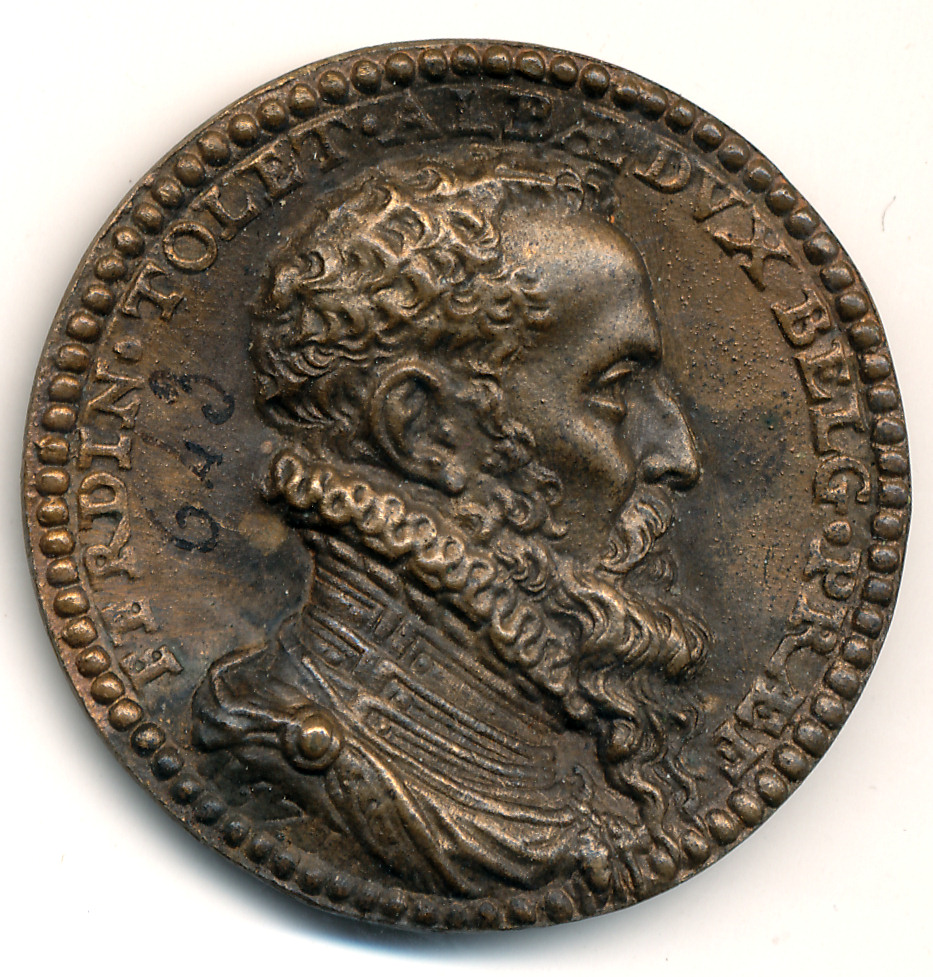
Head of a bronze medal with the effigy and the cuirass of the Grand Alba bearing the Golden Fleece in commemoration of his triumphs in 1571 with the Latin legend «FERDIN[andus] • TOLET[anus] • ALBÆ • DUX • BELG • PRÆF[ectus]», which means, in English, "Fernando de Toledo Duke of Alba Governor of the Netherlands"

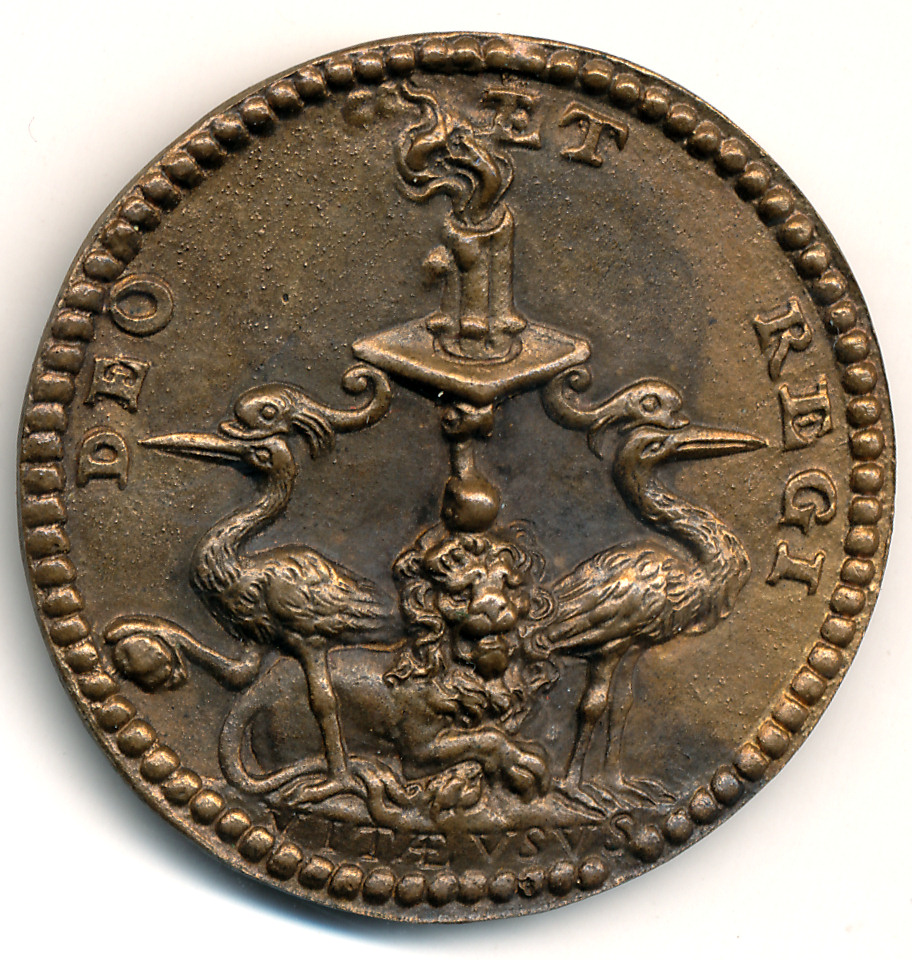
Back of the same medal with the Latin inscription «DEO et REGI VITÆ VSVS», which means, in English, "God and King are purposes of life"

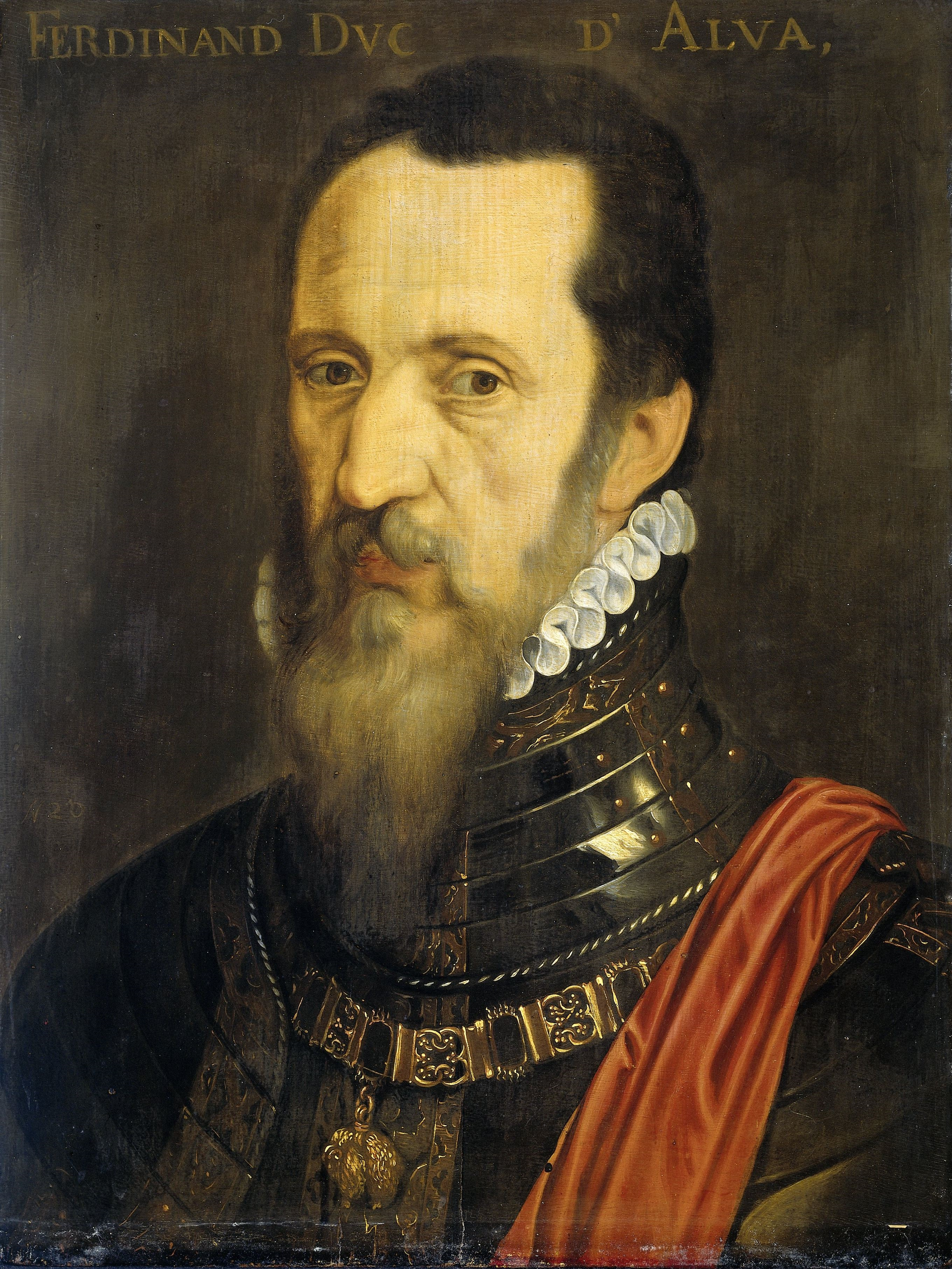
Fernando Álvarez de Toledo by Willem Key (1568)

On 26 December 1566 Alba received the Golden Rose, the blessed sword and hat granted by Pope Pius V, through the papal brief Solent Romani Pontifices, in recognition of his singular efforts in favor of Catholicism and for being considered one of his champions.

From August to October 1566, the "Iconoclasm" (Dutch: Beeldenstorm) took place in the Netherlands, during which Calvinist mobs attacked and destroyed numerous Catholic monasteries and churches, ransacking tombs and destroying statues. To tackle the civil and religious rebels, King Philip II sent Alba to Brussels on 22 August 1567, at the head of a powerful army. Upon arrival, he replaced Margaret of Parma, the sister of the Spanish king, as head of the civil jurisdiction. He decided that the local nobility was in open rebellion against the king and supported the new Protestant teachings, heresy in the Catholic view.

A few days later, on 5 September 1567, Alba established the "Council of Troubles", popularly known in the Netherlands as the "Court of Blood," to prosecute those responsible for the riots of 1566, especially those deemed heretics. Alba also targeted the local Catholic nobles who favoured dialogue and who opposed outside intervention. Two of the three heads of Flemish nobility, the Count of Egmont, a Catholic General for Philip II, who had led the cavalry that defeated the French at the Battle of San Quentin, and Philip de Montmorency, Count of Horn, were arrested and the court sentenced both counts to death. The Mayor of Antwerp, Anthony van Stralen, Lord of Merksem and Jan van Casembroot were other famous victims of the bloody repression, along with a large group of other apostates. Those condemned were executed on 5 June 1568 in the Town Hall Square in Brussels. Alba had little confidence in conventional Flemish justice, which he perceived as sympathetic to the defendants, and witnessed the executions in person. He would later become equally mistrustful of the local helpers of the Council of Troubles as possibly having their own agendas.

The maintenance of the troops in Flanders entailed substantial economic costs. The Duke imposed new taxes on the population and reformed its laws. Some cities, including Utrecht, refused to pay and declared a rebellion, which quickly spread throughout the Netherlands. William the Silent, the prince of Orange, enlisted the help of the French Huguenots and started to actively support the rebellion. William and the Huguenots took many Dutch cities. The Spanish troops advanced under banners with the Latin legend Pro lege, rege, et grege, which in English means For the law, the king, and the people [literally, the flock]. In 1572 the Spanish army carried out the Spanish Fury at Mechelen, retaking and sacking the city after the rebel garrison had left. From there, they retook Zutphen and Naarden. The Spanish Siege of Haarlem, characterized by brutality and savagery on both sides, culminated in the surrender of the city and the execution of all the garrison, estimated at 2,000 men. The subsequent Siege of Alkmaar was unsuccessful however: it was the first defeat in a full scale engagement for the Spanish troops during the Dutch revolt. The prolonged military campaigns and the harsh repression of the rebel citizenry earned the 3rd Duke of Alba the nickname "The Iron Duke" in the Netherlands, and he became an important element of the anti-Spanish Black Legend. His reputation was used for propaganda purposes by rebel statesman Philips of Marnix, Lord of Saint-Aldegonde to further strengthen anti-Spanish sentiments in the Netherlands.

In spite of continuous military action, the political situation in the Netherlands had not turned in favour of the Spanish crown. After five years of repression, more than 5,000 executions and numerous complaints to the Spanish court, Philip II decided to change policy and relieve the Duke. The monarch sent Luis de Requesens to replace him. De Requesens tried to appease the situation by giving concessions to the rebels. Alba returned to Spain in 1573.

Nevertheless, the Duke still had influence in the Royal Council. Alba belonged to the conservative Spanish faction called Albistas or imperialists. This faction included the Inquisitor General Fernando de Valdés y Salas, the House of Pimentel, the Duke de Alburquerque and other members of the House of Álvarez de Toledo. The Albistas advised the king to take a firm stand in the Netherlands. The Albistas' hardline position was hotly contested by the liberal Ebolistas or humanists, led by Ruy Gómez de Silva, prince of Éboli and his secretary Francisco de Eraso. After the death of the prince of Éboli in 1573, the royal secretary Antonio Pérez went on to lead the liberal faction and began his association with Ana de Mendoza de la Cerda, Princess of Éboli. Against the Albistas' urging, King Philip II himself publicly acknowledged that "it is not possible to carry Flanders forward by way of war." Political concessions by Luis de Requesens failed to end the rebellion in the Netherlands and hostilities soon resumed. These failures of the Ebolistas to end the Dutch revolt raised the distrust of the king, and Philip II again granted the Duke of Alba an important position in court.

=== Portuguese succession (1580–1582) ===
After the death of King Sebastian of Portugal, who had no heirs, in the Battle of Alcácer Quibir in 1578, the crown fell to his great uncle Cardinal Henry I of Portugal. The death of the latter, without any appointed heirs, led to the Portuguese succession crisis of 1580.

One of the claimants to the throne, António, Prior of Crato, a bastard son of Infante Louis, Duke of Beja and only grandson through the male line of king Manuel I of Portugal, was proclaimed King in June 1580.

Philip II, through his mother Isabella of Portugal also a grandson of Manuel I, did not recognize Antonio as king of Portugal. The king appointed Fernando, Duke of Alba, as captain general of his army. The duke was 73 years old and ill at the time. Fernando mustered his forces, estimated at 20,000 men, in Badajoz, and in June 1580 crossed the Spanish-Portuguese border and moved to Lisbon. In late August he defeated a Portuguese army at the Battle of Alcântara and entered Lisbon. This cleared the way for Philip II who became Philip I of Portugal, and created a dynastic union spanning all of Iberia under the Spanish crown.

King Philip II rewarded Fernando with the titles of 1st Viceroy of Portugal and Constable of Portugal on 18 July 1580. With these titles Fernando represented the Spanish monarch in Portugal and was second in hierarchy only after the king in Portugal. Fernando held both titles until his death in 1582.

== Marriage and children ==
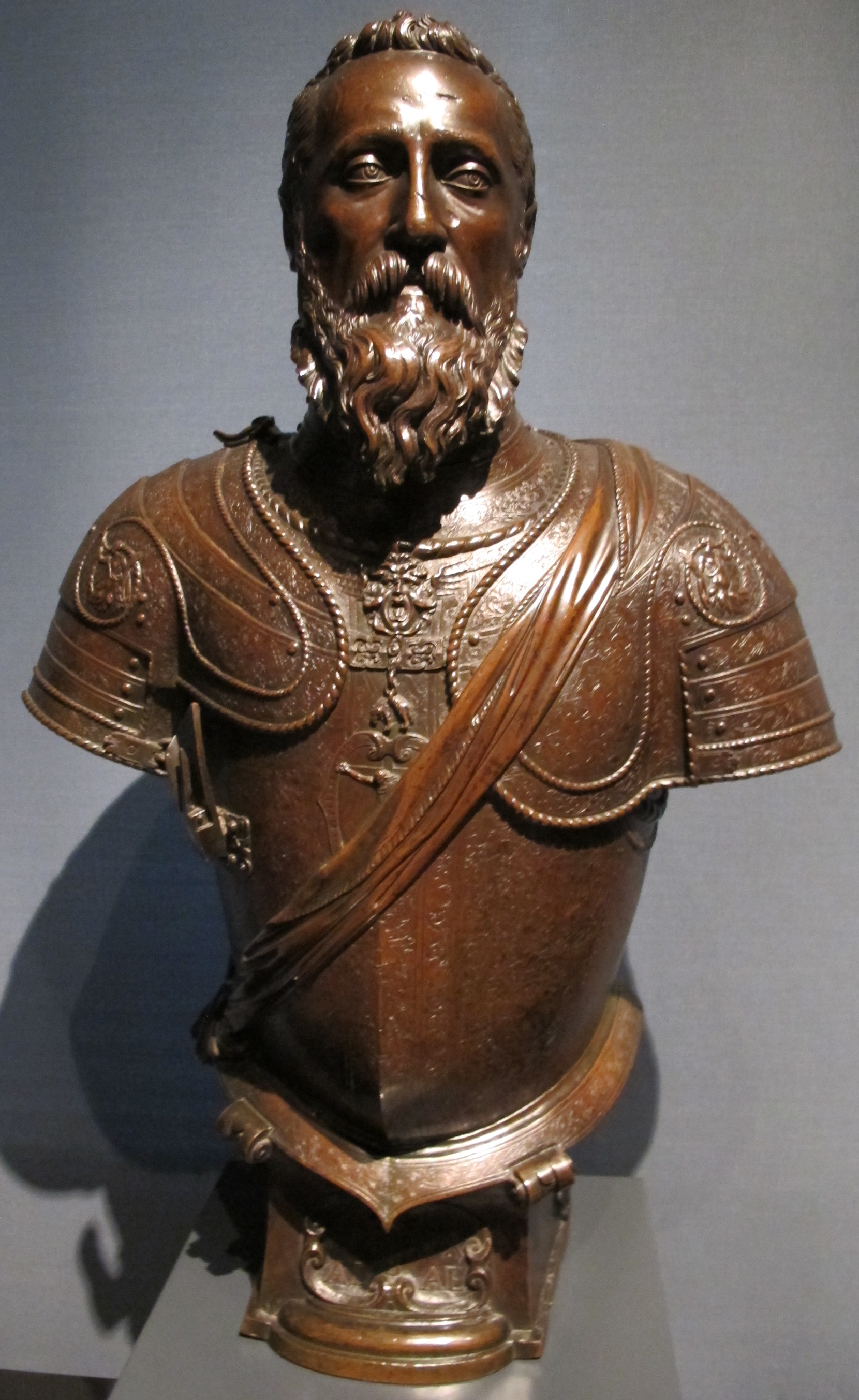
Fernando Álvarez de Toledo, 3rd Duke of Alba, by Leone Leoni.

His first child, Fernando de Toledo (1527–1591), was an illegitimate son with a miller's daughter from the town of La Aldehuela.

27 April 1529 the Duke married his cousin María Enríquez de Toledo y Guzmán (died 1583), daughter of Diego Enríquez de Guzmán, III Count of Alba de Liste, with whom he had four children.

- García Álvarez de Toledo y Enríquez de Guzmán (1530–1548)
- Fadrique Álvarez de Toledo y Enríquez de Guzman, 4th Duke of Alba (1537–1585)
- Diego Álvarez de Toledo y Enríquez de Guzmán (1541–1583), Count of Lerín and Constable of Navarre by his marriage, held on 24 March 1565, with Brianda Beaumont (1540–1588), daughter of Luis de Beaumont. He was succeeded by Antonio Álvarez de Toledo y Beaumont, 5th Duke of Alba (1568–1639)
- Beatriz Álvarez de Toledo y Enríquez de Guzmán (died 1637), married Álvaro Pérez Osorio, 5th Marquess of Astorga.

== Later years and death ==
Alba died in Lisbon on 11 December 1582, at the age of seventy-five; he was given the last rites by the famous Luis de Granada.

His remains were transferred to Alba de Tormes, where he was buried in the convent of San Leonardo. In 1619 they were transferred to the Convento de San Esteban, Salamanca. In 1983 a mausoleum was erected over his grave, funded by the Provincial Deputation of Salamanca.

== Aceh War reference ==
In 1904 an intensive debate took place in the Dutch press and House of Representatives on the conduct of Gotfried Coenraad Ernst van Daalen, a Dutch commander who during the then current Aceh War was charged with the killing of numerous civilians, including women and children, during the conquest of Aceh in northern Sumatra. Some of van Daalen's detractors compared his conduct with the atrocities committed by the Duke of Alba, still well remembered in Dutch historical memory.

== Ancestry ==
García Álvarez de Toledo y Carrillo de Toledo; I Duke of Alba
Fadrique Álvarez de Toledo y Enríquez de Quiñones; II Duke of Alba
María Enriquez de Quiñones y Toledo
García Álvarez de Toledo y Zúñiga
Álvaro de Zúñiga y Guzmán; I Duke of Plasencia
Isabel de Zúñiga y Pimentel
Leonor Pimentel y Zúñiga
Fernando Álvarez de Toledo y Pimentel; III Duke of Alba
Alonso Pimentel y Enríquez; III Count of Benavente
Rodrigo Alonso Pimentel; I Duke of Benavente
María de Quiñones y Portugal
Beatriz Pimentel y Pacheco
Juan Pacheco, I Duke of Escalona
María Pacheco y Portocarrero señora de Villacidaler
María Portocarrero Enríquez

== Bibliography ==
- Hobbs, Nicolas (2007). "Grandes de España" (in Spanish).
- Instituto de Salazar y Castro. Elenco de Grandezas y Titulos Nobiliarios Españoles (in Spanish). Periodic publication.
- Falcó y Osorio, María del Rosario. Duquesa de Berwick y de Alba. Catálogo de las colecciones expuestas en las vitrinas del Palacio de Liria. Madrid. 1898 (in Spanish).
- Fernández Álvarez, Manuel. "El duque de hierro: Fernando Álvarez de Toledo, III de Alba". Colección Espasa Forum. Espasa-Calpe. Madrid. 2007 (in Spanish) ISBN 978-84-670-2625-2.
- Ferdinand H. M. Grapperhaus, Alva en de tiende penning, 1982. ISBN 9789060111307
- Kamen, Henry (1988). Golden Age Spain. Macmillan. ISBN 9780333419304.
- Kamen, Henry (2004). The Duke of Alba. Yale University Press. ISBN 9780300102833.
  - Kamen, Henry. El gran duque de Alba. Cuarta edición, cartoné. La Esfera de los Libros. Madrid. 2004/7 (in Spanish) ISBN 978-84-9734-220-9.
- Maltby, William S. Alba: A Biography of Fernando Alvarez de Toledo, Third Duke of Alba, 1507–1582. University of California Press. 1983. ISBN 0-520-04694-3.
  - Maltby, William S. El gran duque de Alba. Prólogo Jacobo Siruela, traducción Eva Rodríguez Halffter. Segunda edición. Ediciones Atalanta. Vilaür. 2007 (in Spanish) ISBN 978-84-935313-8-6.
- Patterson, Benton (2013). With the Heart of a King: Elizabeth I of England, Philip II of Spain, and the Fight for a Nation's Soul and Crown. St. Martin Press. ISBN 9781466858848.
- Junta de Castilla y León. Consejería de Educación y Cultura. Los Álvarez de Toledo Nobleza viva. María del Pilar García Pinacho. España. 1998 (in Spanish) ISBN 84-7846-775-0.
- Alba, General and Servant to the Crown. Edited by Maurits Ebben, Margriet Lacy-Bruijn and Rolof van Hövell tot Westerflier. Karwansaray. 2013. ISBN 978-94-90258-08-5.
- Thompson, James (1909). The Wars of Religion in France 1559-1576: The Huguenots, Catherine de Medici and Philip II. Chicago University Press.

Government offices
Preceded by Ferdinando Gonzaga	Governor of Milan; 1555–1556	Succeeded by Cristoforo Madruzzo
Preceded by Bernardino de Mendoza	Viceroy of Naples; 1556–1558	Succeeded by Fadrique Álvarez de Toledo
Preceded by Margaret of Parma	Governor of the Netherlands; 1567–1573	Succeeded by Luis de Requesens y Zúñiga
New title	Viceroy of Portugal; 1580–1582	Succeeded by Albert of Austria
Preceded by João de Bragança	Constable of Portugal; 1581–1582	Succeeded by Teodósio de Bragança
Spanish nobility
Preceded by Fadrique Álvarez de Toledo	Duke of Alba; 1531–1582	Succeeded by Fadrique Álvarez de Toledo
Preceded by García Álvarez de Toledo	Marquess of Coria; 1510–1582	Succeeded by Fadrique Álvarez de Toledo
