= Fadrique Álvarez de Toledo, 4th Duke of Alba =

Spanish military personnel (1537-1583)

The Most Excellent Fadrique Álvarez de Toledo 4th Duke of Alba GE
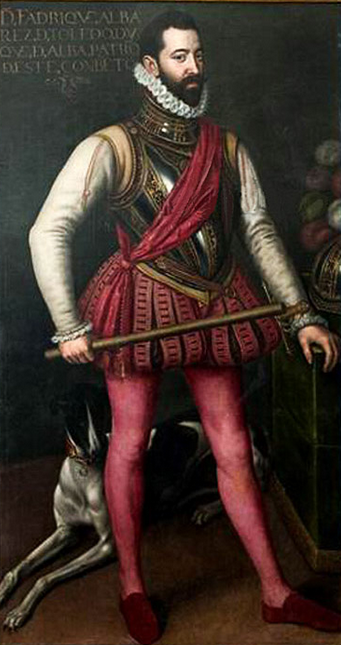
- Born: Fadrique Álvarez de Toledo y Enríquez de Guzmán; 21 November 1537
- Died: 11 December 1585 (aged 48); Alba de Tormes, Spain

Fadrique Álvarez de Toledo y Enríquez de Guzmán, 4th Duke of Alba, Grandee of Spain (in full, Spanish: Don Fadrique Álvarez de Toledo y Enríquez de Guzmán, cuarto Duque de Alba de Tormes, Duque de Huéscar, Marqués de Coria, Señor del estado de Valdecorneja, Comendador Mayor de la Orden de Calatrava) (21 November 1537 – 3 September 1585), was a commander in the Spanish army during the Eighty Years' War.

== Biography ==
He was the first legitimate son of Fernando Álvarez de Toledo, 3rd Duke of Alba, and became the fourth Duke after his father's death. His titles included Duke of Huéscar, Marquis of Coria and Comendador Mayor in the Order of Calatrava.

He had two short marriages, in 1555 to Guiomar de Aragón (died 1557), daughter of Alfonso de Aragón, Duke of Segorbe and in 1562 to María Josefa Pimentel y Girón (died 1566), daughter of Antonio Alonso Pimentel y Herrera de Velasco, III duque de Benavente.

Between 1557 and 1558 he occasionally replaced his father during his absences in the position of viceroy of Naples.

In 1566, Fadrique had promised to marry Magdalena de Guzman, lady of Queen Elisabeth of Valois, but resiled from it, costing him arrest and imprisonment in the Castle of La Mota, Medina del Campo, Valladolid.

The following year Fadrique was released in exchange for serving in the military for three years on the border with Oran and suffering banishment from the court for three more years.

In April 1568, finding himself in Murcia waiting to embark for Oran, Philip II commuted this punishment to a new destination in Flanders, where his father was at the head of the tercios in his capacity as governor of the Spanish Netherlands.

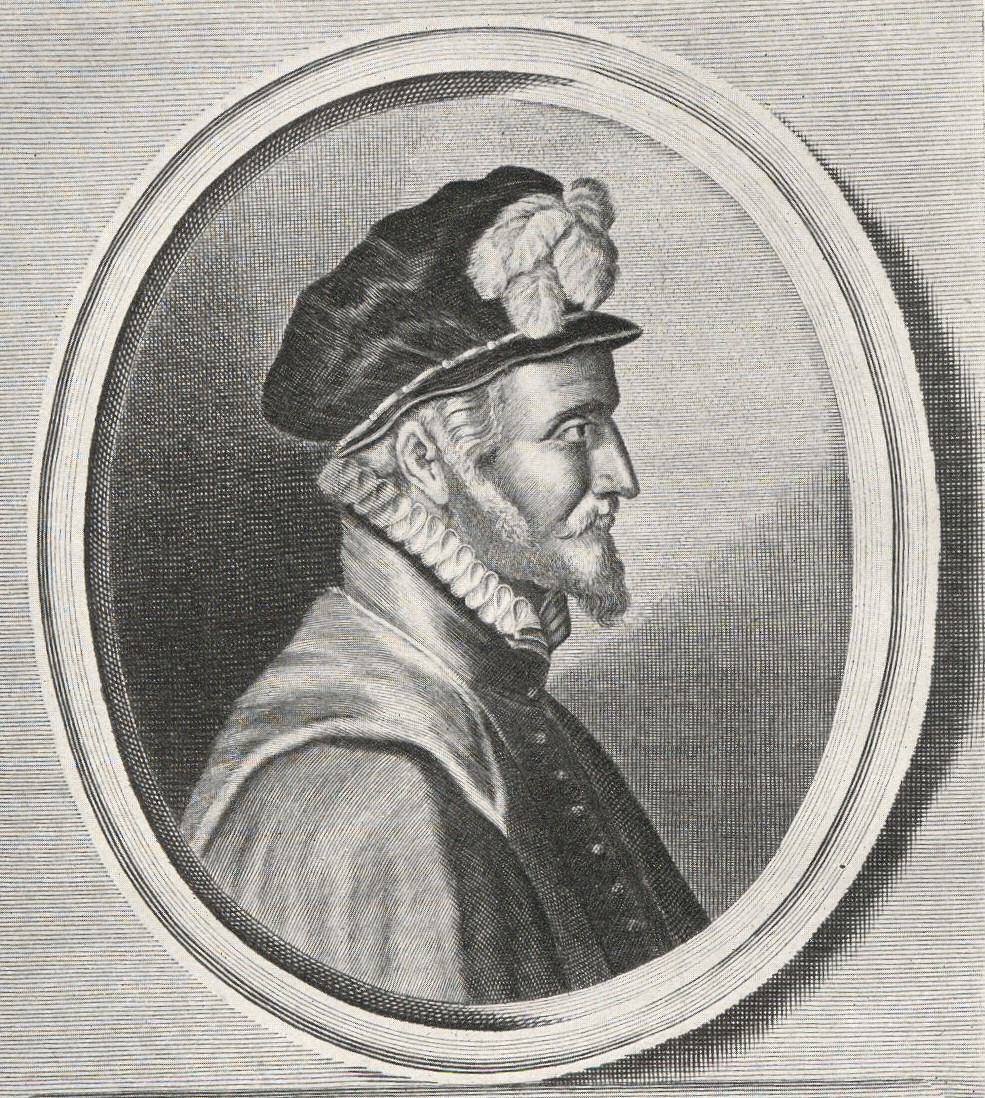
Don Fadrique Álvarez de Toledo, IV Duke of Alba.

Don Fadrique was commander of the Spanish troops during the most bloody phase of the war in the Netherlands. He was in charge of the Spanish troops that slaughtered the populations of Mechelen, Zutphen and Naarden, as well as during the costly Siege of Haarlem. In Mechelen, his troops were allowed to pillage, loot and destroy for three days. These and other pillages were later known in Europe as the Spanish Fury.

His army failed in the siege of Alkmaar, and he had to retreat. His father the Duke did not approve, he was afraid of his son's reputation that was already not good with Philip II of Spain, their King.

In 1578, Philip II ordered the case reopened against Fadrique, during which it was discovered that in order to prevent the marriage with Magdalena de Guzman, he had secretly married by proxy to María de Toledo, daughter of García Álvarez de Toledo and Osorio, IV Marquis of Villafranca del Bierzo, with the permission of his father the Duke of Alba, in contravention of the provisions of the King. Fadrique was again confined to his prison in the Castillo de la Mota, and his father was banished from the court, from where he went into exile to Uceda.

Because of his poor state of health and the precarious conditions of his confinement, in May 1580 Fadrique was released from his prison, under the condition of residing in the town of Alba, from where he was prohibited from leaving.

From his union with María de Toledo he had a son in 1582, Fernando Álvarez de Toledo y Álvarez de Toledo, VI Marquis of Coria, who died that same year.

He was Duke between 11 December 1582 and 11 December 1583 and was succeeded in his titles of nobility by his nephew Antonio Álvarez de Toledo y Beaumont.

== Ancestry ==
8. Fadrique Álvarez de Toledo; 2nd Duke of Alba
4. García Álvarez de Toledo y Zúñiga
9. Isabel de Zúñiga y Pimentel
2. Fernando Álvarez de Toledo y Pimentel; 3rd Duke of Alba
10. Rodrigo Alonso Pimentel; Duke of Benavente
5. Beatriz Pimentel
11. María Pacheco; Lady of Villacidaler
1. Fadrique Álvarez de Toledo y Enríquez de Guzmán
12. Enrique Enríquez
6. Diego Enríquez de Guzmán; 3rd Count of Alba de Liste
13. Teresa Enríquez; Lady of Villada
3. María Enríquez de Guzmán y Toledo
14. Fadrique Álvarez de Toledo; 2nd Duke of Alba
7. Leonor Álvarez de Toledo y Zúñiga
15. Isabel de Zúñiga y Pimentel

Spanish nobility
| Preceded by Fernando; Álvarez de Toledo | Duke of Alba; 1582–1583 | Succeeded by Antonio; Álvarez de Toledo |
| New title | Duke of Huéscar; 1563–1583 | Succeeded by Antonio; Álvarez de Toledo |
