= Watchtower of El Berrueco =

Cultural property in El Berrueco, Spain

- Atalaya de El Berrueco (Spanish)
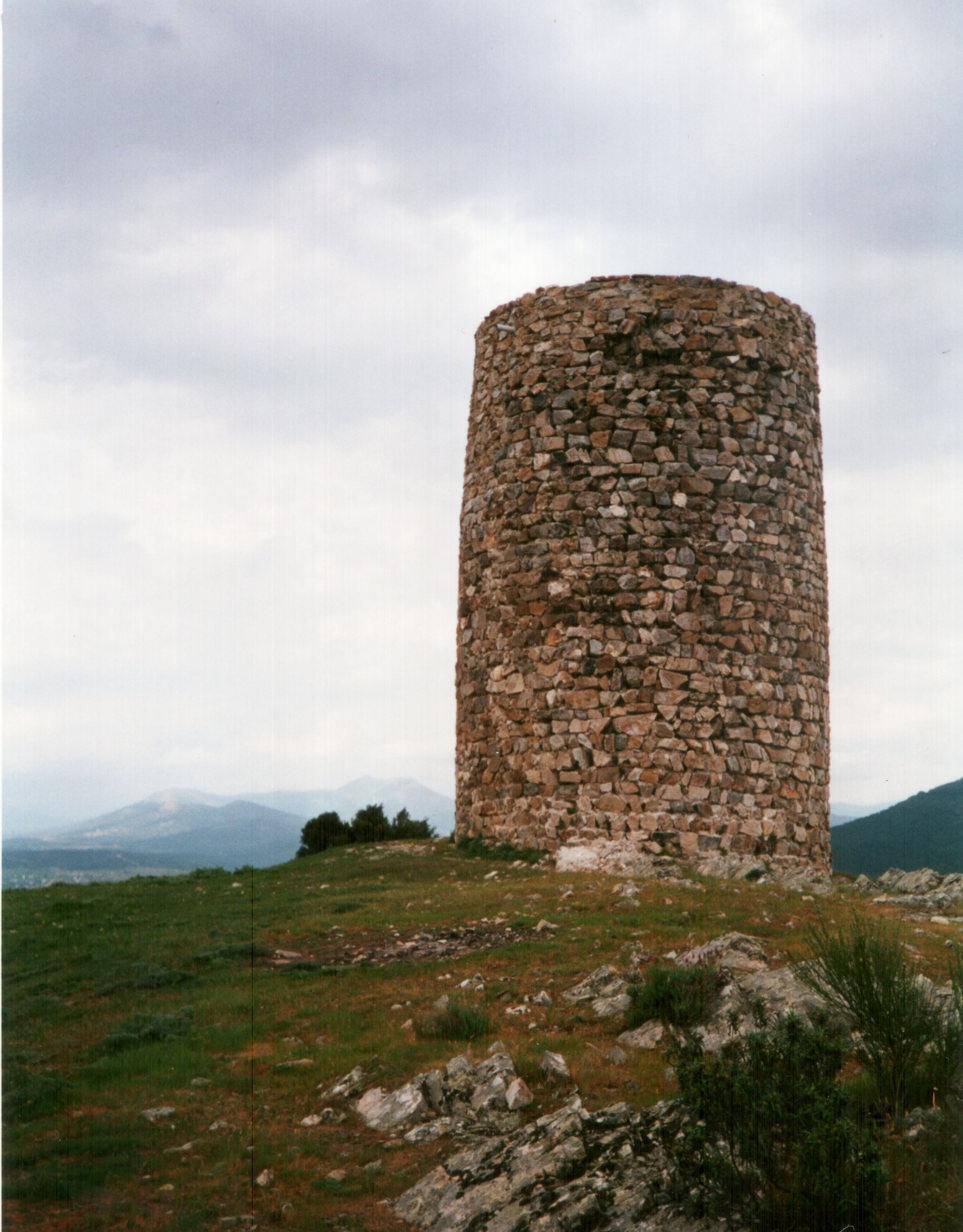

- Location within Spain
- 40.874115°N 3.536831°W
- Location: El Berrueco, Spain

Spanish Cultural Heritage
- Official name: Atalaya de El Berrueco
- Type: Non-movable
- Criteria: Monument
- Designated: 1983
- Reference no.: RI-51-0004933

The Watchtower of El Berrueco (Spanish: Atalaya de El Berrueco), also known as the Watchtower of Torrepedrera (Spanish: Atalaya de Torrepedrera) is a watchtower of Islamic origin located in El Berrueco, Spain. It is close to the El Altazar dam, atop a 1,030 m (3,380 ft) hill in the Sierra de Guadarrama. It was declared Bien de Interés Cultural in 1983.

== History ==
It was constructed sometime between the 9th and 10th centuries, that is, between the emirates of Muhammad I and Abd al-Rahman III.

It was part of a system of watchtowers built by the Muslims at different points of the Sierra de Guadarrama with the purpose of surveilling the main valleys and ways of communication against possible Christian incursions. This defense network was of great military importance, having an enclave in the frontier zone known as the Middle March of Al-Andalus.

Along with other towers and fortresses, the watchtower of El Berrueco controlled the waterways of the Jarama leading to the port of Somosierra, one of the natural passes between the northern and southern portions of the Inner Plateau. It communicated with the nearby castle of Uceda, in the province of Guadalajara, to which it gave notice of Christian advance parties.

== Features ==
The Watchtower of El Berrueco has a circular layout and resembles a tree trunk due to the irregularities in its cylindrical shape. The structure was built in ashlar, but the ground floor is solid stone. The tower is accessible through the second floor, where the door is situated, approximately 2.25 m (7 ft 5 in) above the ground.

The thickness of its walls varies between 1.58 m (5 ft 2 in) at the base to 1.05 m (3 ft 5 in) at the top. The inner diameter is 3.3 m (11 ft).

It is considered to be well preserved. Although it is located on private property, access to it is permitted.
