= Palacio de las Dueñas =

Palace in Seville, Spain

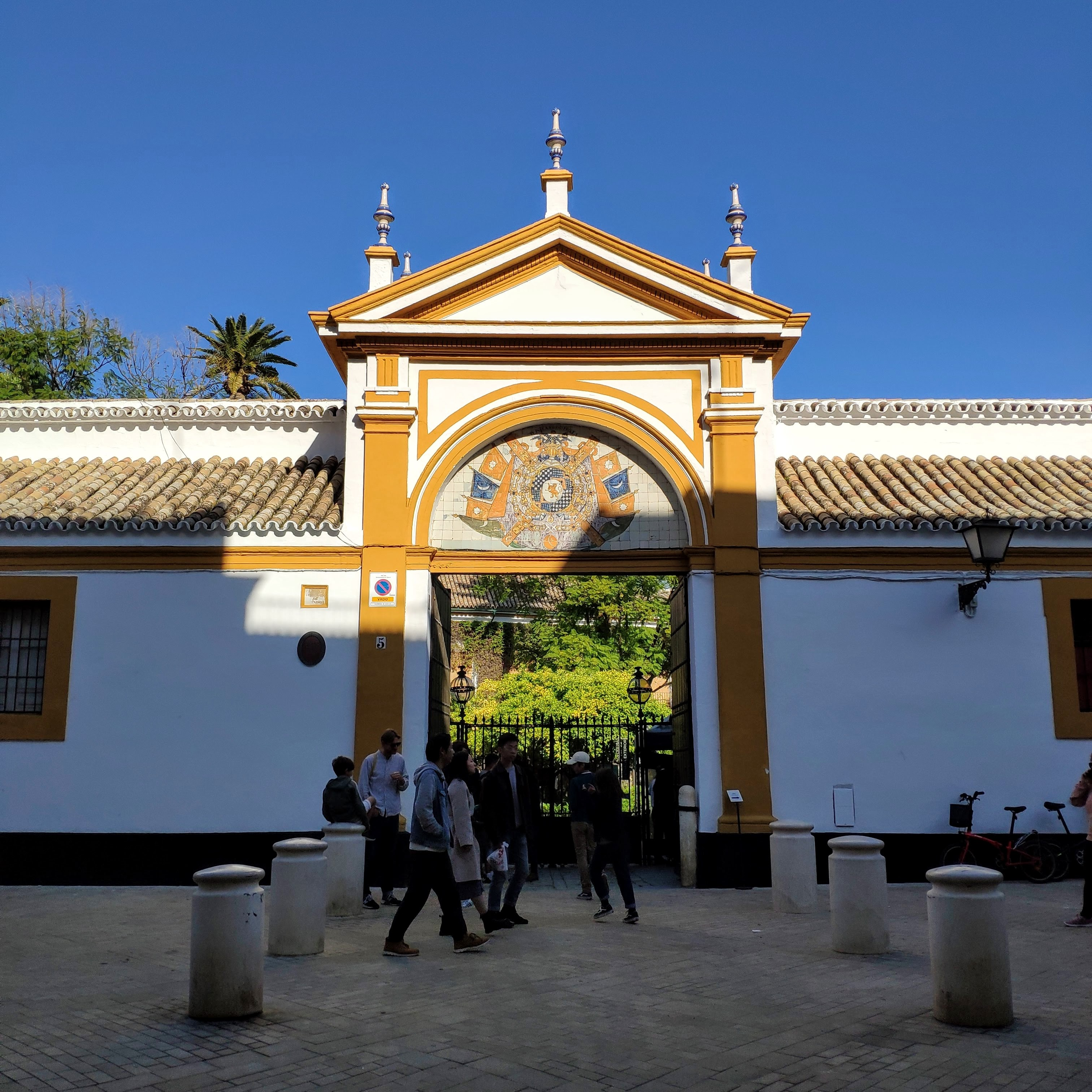
Main gate

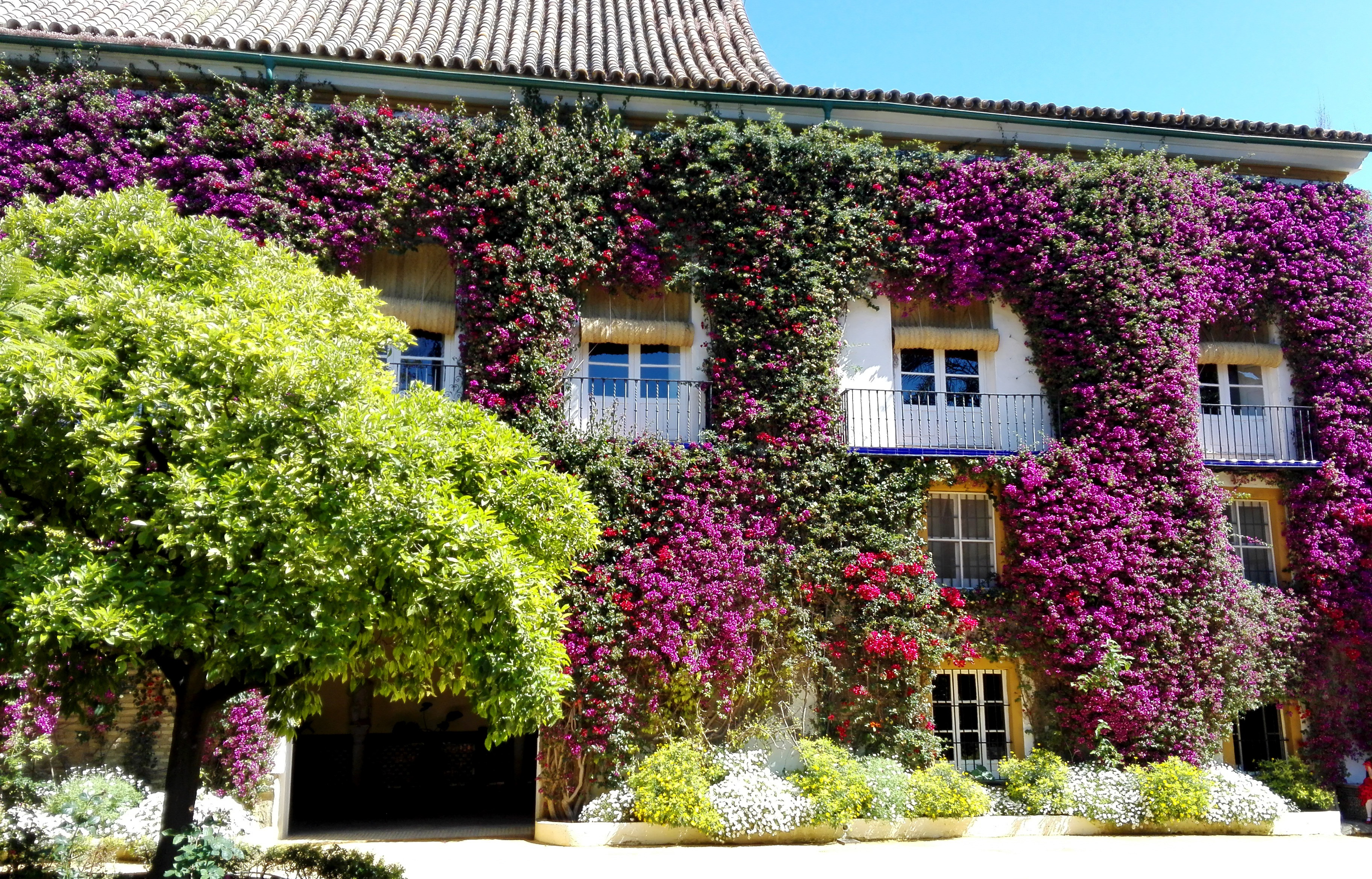
Bougainvillea facade of the Palace

Palacio de las Dueñas (occasionally, Casa Palacio de las Dueñas) is a palace in Seville, Spain, currently belonging to the House of Alba. It was built in the late 15th century in the Renaissance style with Gothic and Moorish influences. The palace is one of the major historic homes of great architectural and artistic heritage in the city. The poet Antonio Machado was born here, as were Carlos Falcó, 5th Marquess of Griñón, and the Marquess of Castel-Moncayo. On October 5, 2011, Cayetana Fitz-James Stuart, 18th Duchess of Alba, married her third husband here. The palace became a national monument on June 3, 1931.

The promoter of its opening to tourist visits (in 2016) was the then-current Duke of Alba, Carlos Fitz-James Stuart y Martínez de Irujo. Today, it is one of the most visited monuments in Seville.

== History ==
The palace was constructed in the late 15th century, a time associated with a robust economy in the area, which included the construction of the Alcazar Real and the Casa de Pilatos. It was built by the Pineda family, Lords of Casabermeja. In 1496, Pedro Pineda, Mayor of the city, and his wife Doña Maria de Monsalve sold their home to Doña Catalina de Ribera, widow of Governor Don Pedro Enriquez, to raise ransom money to retrieve Don Juan de Pineda, taken prisoner by the Moors. Thereafter, a series of expansions occurred, later forming a Renaissance palace under the auspices of Fernando Enrique de Ribera y Quinones and especially his widow Doña Inés Portocarrero y Cardenas (great-great-grandmother of Ana de Velasco y Girón).

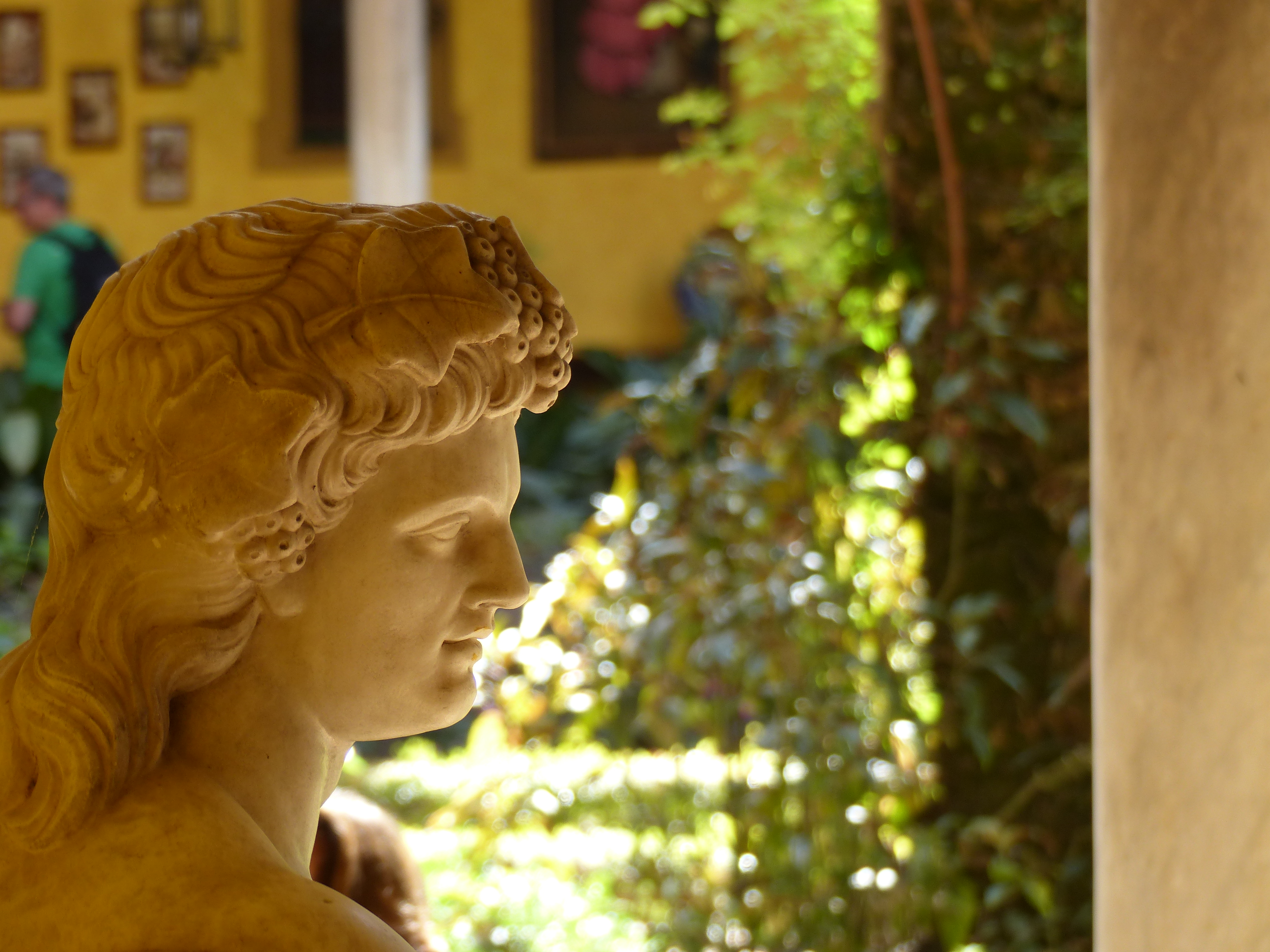
A sculpture in one of the palace's courtyards

The building became the property of the House of Alba after the marriage of Antonia Enríquez de Ribera y Portocarrero, 4th Marchioness of Villanueva del Río, to Fernando Álvarez de Toledo, 6th Duke of Alba.

For a time, it was the residence of Lord Holland, an ardent admirer of Spanish literature, and the author of a memoir on Lope de Vega and Guillen de Castro. Machado lived in the palace during his early childhood, with his father serving as the Duke of Alba's caretaker.

The palace's name derives from the monastery of Santa María de las Dueñas, which in 1248 was known to house nuns and servants of Saint Ferdinand and Alfonso X the Wise. The monastery was in the palace's periphery and was destroyed in 1868. The palace underwent significant renovation in the 18th and 19th centuries.

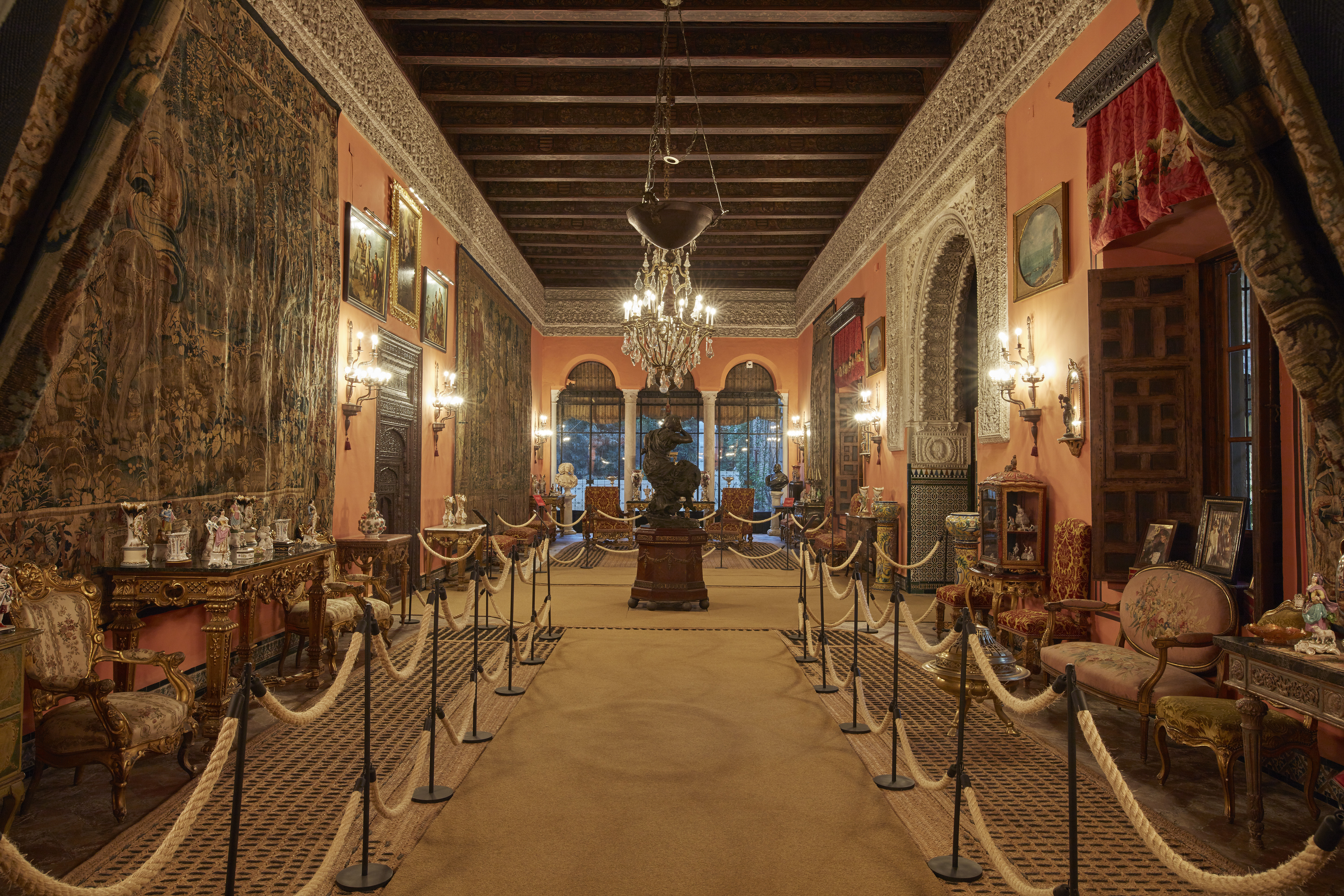
Gypsy sculpture (Benlluire)

== Architecture ==
The palace consists of a series of courtyards and buildings. The style ranges from Gothic, to Moorish, to the Renaissance, with local influences in the bricks, shingles, tiles, whitewashed walls, and pottery. Its mixed style resembles that of Casa de Pilatos and Casa de los Pinelo.

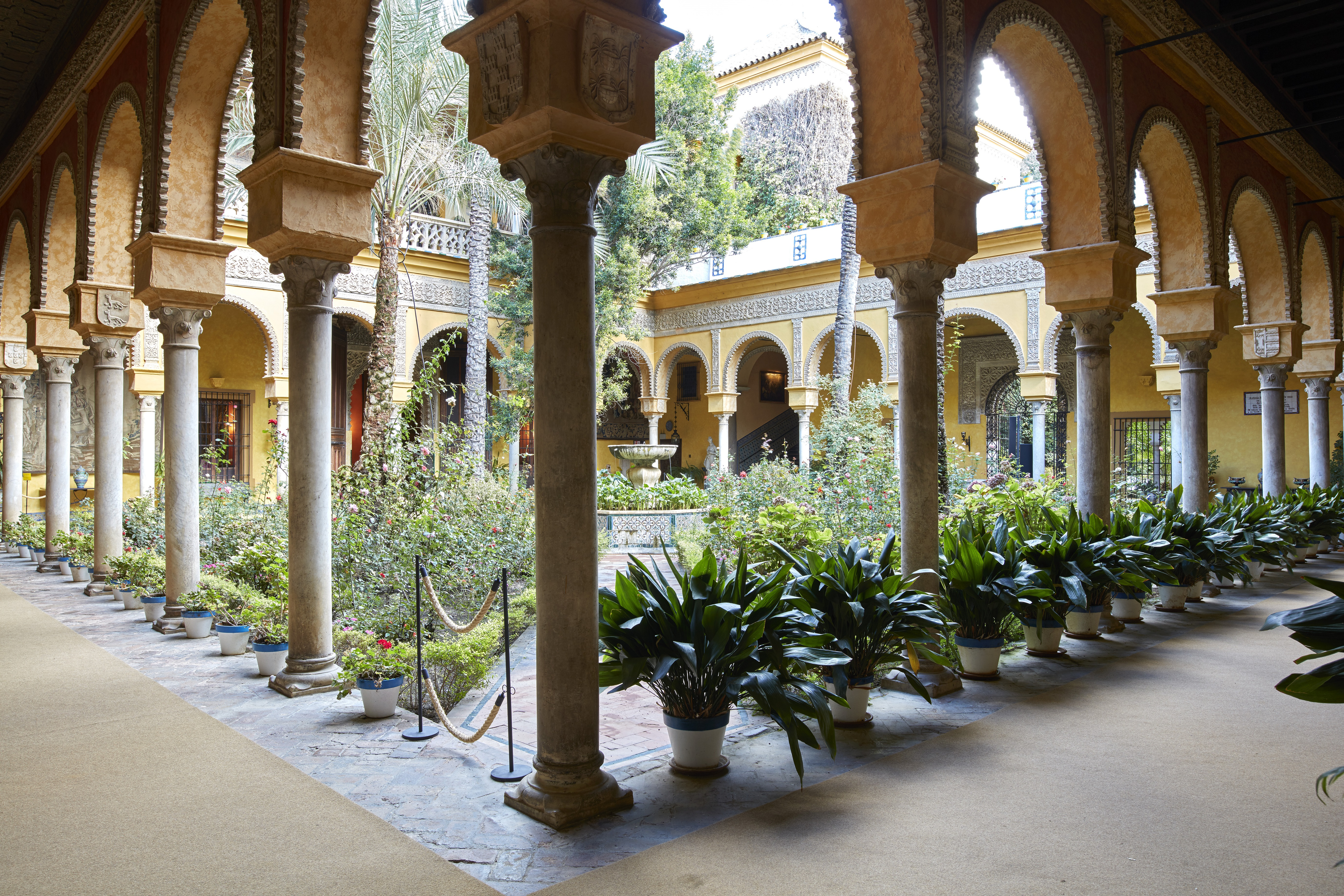
The main courtyard

Interior

The palace is fitted with long passageways. As in the Casa de Pilatos, the staircase of this palace was built beneath a vaulted roof. At the top floor is a room whose ceiling has an octagonal shape and is decorated with gold alfarje.

Exterior

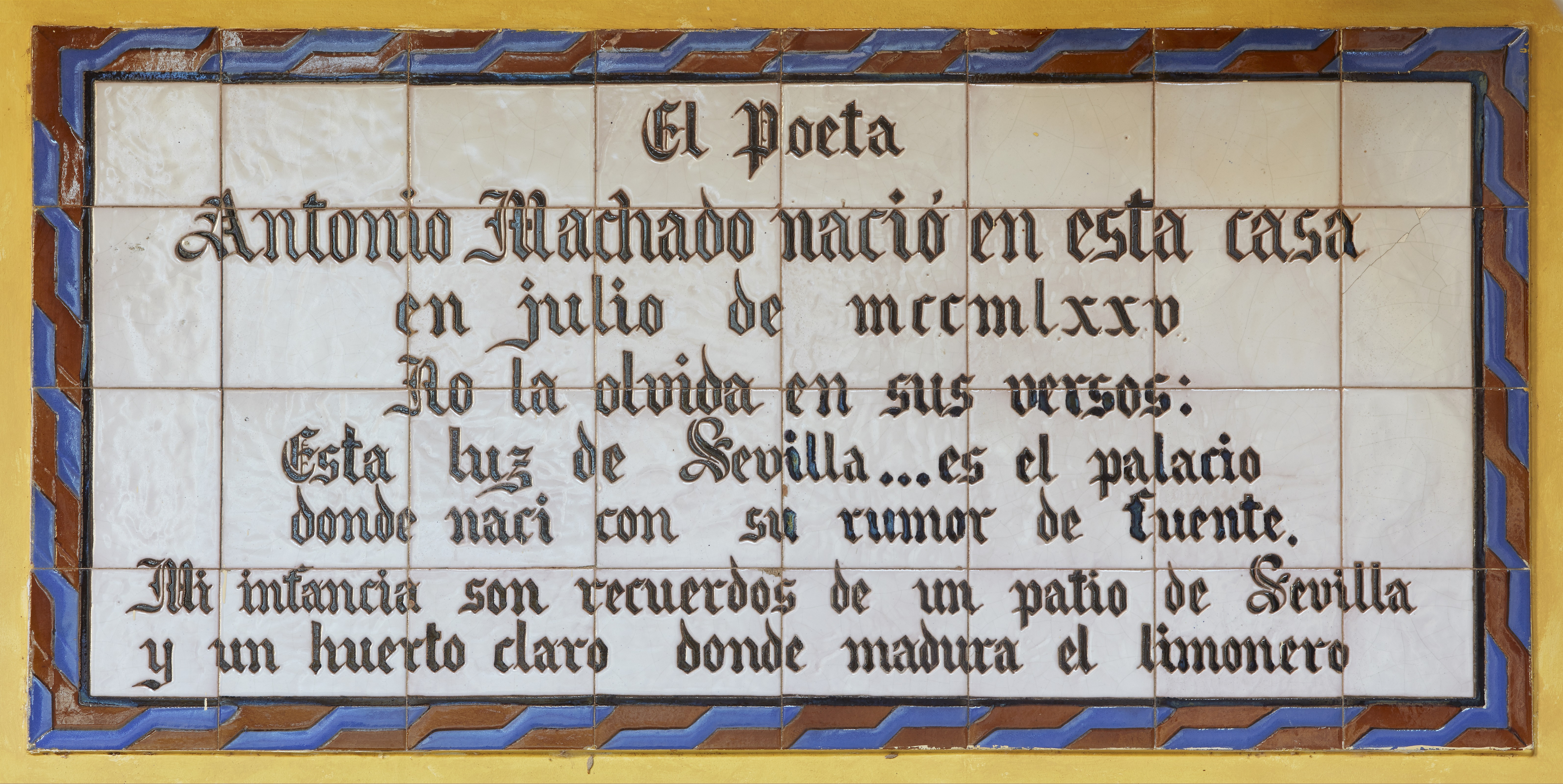
Antonio Machado plaque

The entry door is of Mudéjar style. The palace was fitted with eleven patios, nine fountains, and over 100 marble columns. Of these, one patio remains, and it is surrounded by a gallery with columns. The Andalusian patio, like a similar one at Casa de Pilatos, dominates the exterior of the property. At the entrance to the palace, in the main archway, there is the shield of the Duchy of Alba in tiles, made by Triana of Seville in the 17th or 18th century. The gardens hold very important and unique species of plants (for example, one of the oldest Cycas revoluta in the world). Its fabulous bougainvillea facade is an icon of the Palace.

=== Text in the plaque ===
Original plaque	English translation
El poeta Antonio Machado nació en esta casa en julio de mccmlxxv No la ha olvidado en sus versos: Esta luz de Sevilla ... es el palacio donde nací con su rumor de fuente. Mi infancia son recuerdos de un patio y un huerto claro donde madura el limonero	The poet Antonio Machado was born in this house in July of mccmlxxv He has not forgotten it in his verses: This light of Seville ... is the palace where I was born with the sound of its fountain. My childhood are memories of a patio and a bright potager where the lemon tree ripens

== Grounds and chapel ==
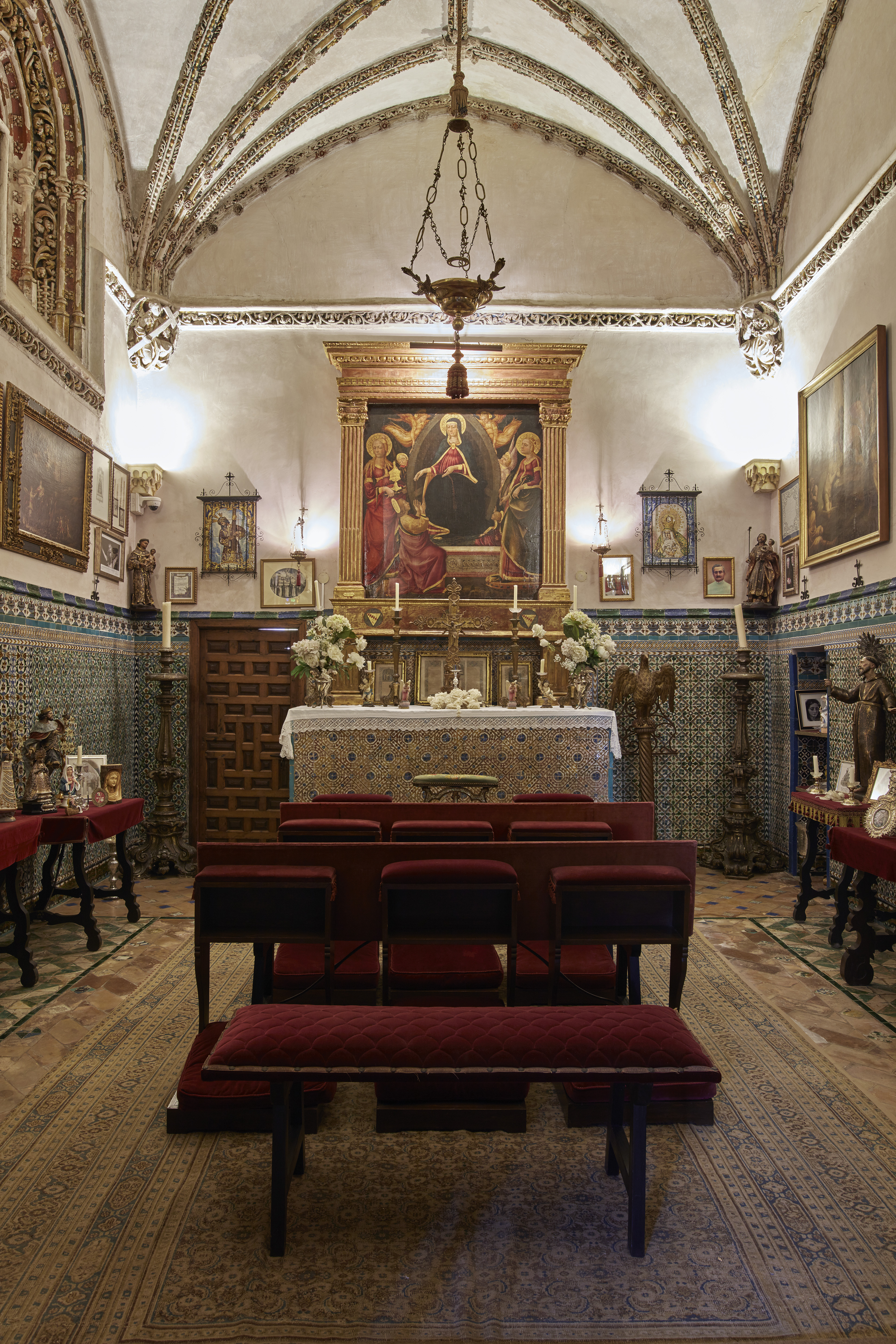
Chapel of Las Dueñas

The courtyard garden, divided into four parts in keeping with its traditional Islamic style, includes tiled paths and a centralized raised fountain. The palace garden's lemon trees and fountain are recurring symbols in Machado's poetry. Behind the garden is a courtyard surrounded by arches with columns of white marble. The arch situated west of the courtyard in the lower galleries gives access to the building that was used as chapel. The 15th-century chapel has fared badly during restorations. The altar contains several tiles with metallic reflections, typical of 16th-century Seville ceramics.

It is also said that Amerigo Vespucci married María Cerezo in this chapel at the beginning of the 16th century.

== Collections ==
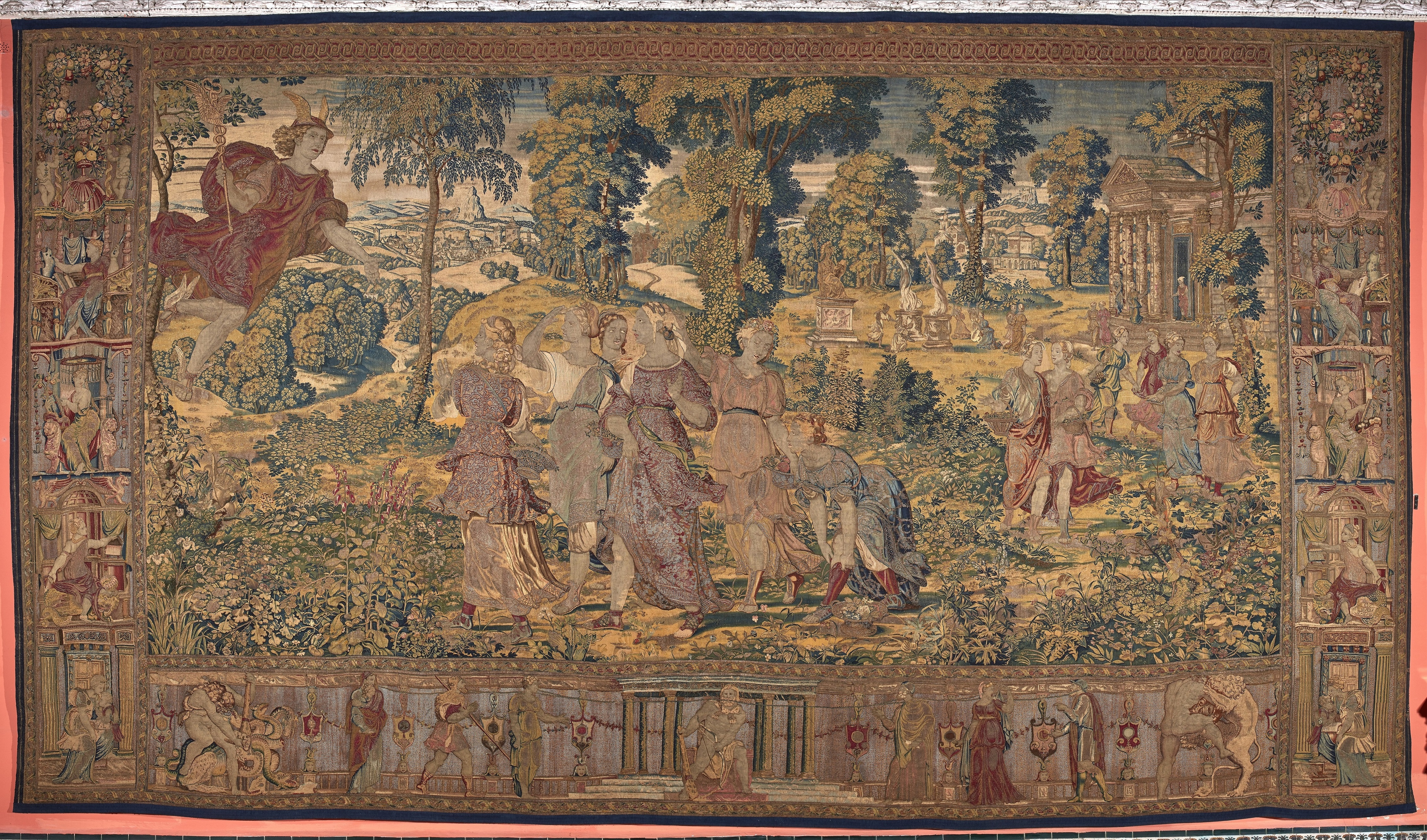
Mercury Enamored of Herse, one of the best tapestries in the world ("uno de los 10 mejores tapices del mundo"), woven by Willem Pannemaker, 1570

One of its main attractions is a large, decorative art collection which contains 1,425 artifacts. According to the newspaper El País, these items are protected under Andalusian law, prohibiting their sale and safeguarding their place in the palace. There is a large collection of Italian and Spanish paintings from the 16th and 17th centuries including Jacopo Bassano (Los cacharreros), Sofonisba Anguissola, Annibale Carracci, Francesco Furini (La creación de Eva), Luca Giordano, Giovanni Paolo Panini, Jusepe de Ribera (Cristo coronado de espinas), Francisco Antolínez, Joaquín Inza, and Neri di Bicci. There is also a watercolor by Jacqueline Kennedy Onassis, painted during her visit in 1960 when she stayed in the bedroom once used by France's Empress Eugénie de Montijo. The paintings represent only a small part of the family's artworks, most of which are in Madrid's Liria Palace. The Palacio de las Dueñas also has a significant collection of antique furniture, ceramics, and other artifacts, including decorative arts, sculpture of Ancient Rome and contemporary (Mariano Benlluire), Flemish tapestries of the 16th and 17th centuries (Willem de Pannemaker), mosaics, and many other pieces of art.

== Bibliography ==
- FALCÓN MÁRQUEZ, Teodoro (2003). El Palacio de las Dueñas y las casas-palacios sevillanas del siglo XVI. Sevilla. Editorial: Fundación Aparejadores. ISBN 84-95278-47-2
