= Church of Santa María de la Varga =

- Iglesia de Santa María de la Varga (Spanish)
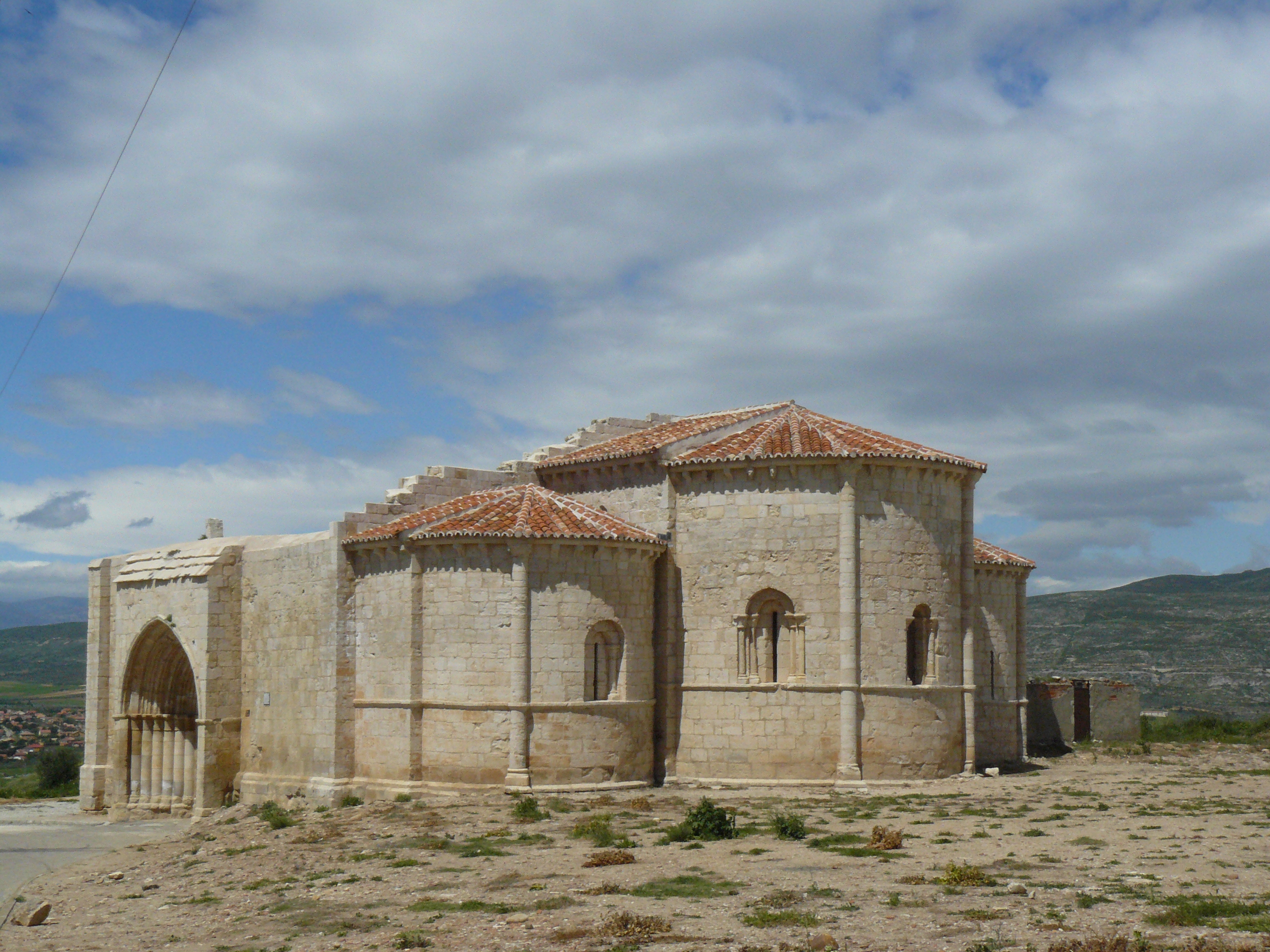

- Location within Spain
- 40.84166°N 3.466718°W
- Location: Uceda, Spain

Spanish Cultural Heritage
- Official name: Iglesia de Santa María de la Varga
- Type: Non-movable
- Criteria: Monument
- Designated: 1991
- Reference no.: RI-51-0007128

The Church of Santa María de la Varga (Spanish: Iglesia de Santa María de la Varga) is a former church located in Uceda, Spain. It was declared Bien de Interés Cultural in 1991.

Built atop a former mosque, the church was erected in a Romanesque style in the 13th century by the Archbishop of Toledo, D. Rodrigo Jiménez de Rada.
