= Antonio Álvarez de Toledo, 5th Duke of Alba =

Spanish nobleman and politician

The Most Excellent Antonio Álvarez de Toledo 5th Duke of Alba GE
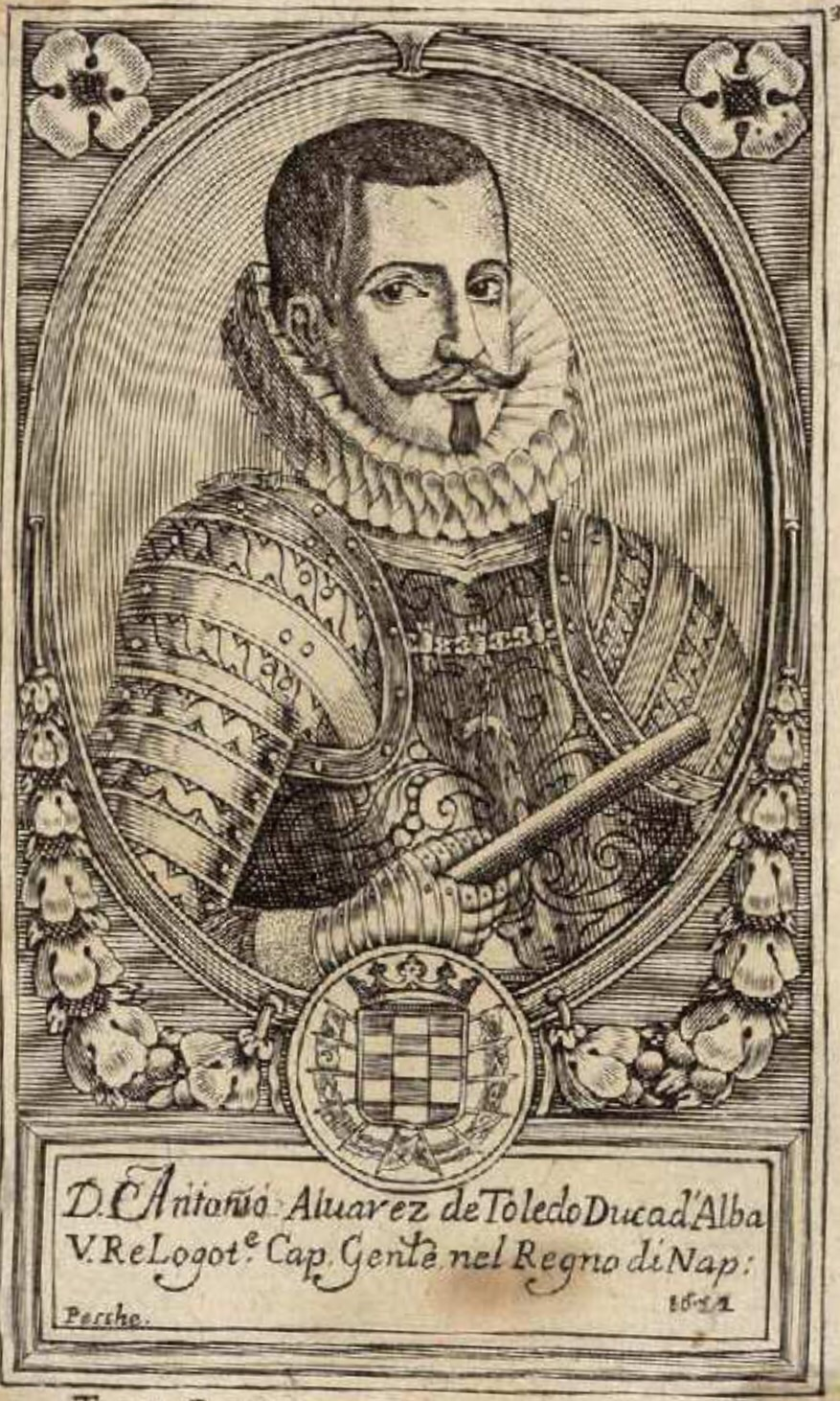
- Born: Antonio Álvarez de Toledo y Beaumont; 1568
- Died: 29 January 1639 (aged 70–71); Naples
- Parents: Diego Álvarez de Toledo y Enríquez de Guzmán (father); Brianda Beaumont (mother)

Antonio Álvarez de Toledo y Beaumont, 5th Duke of Alba, Grandee of Spain, (in full, Spanish: Don Antonio Álvarez de Toledo y Beaumont de Navarra, quinto duque de Alba de Tormes, tercer duque de Huéscar, sexto conde de Lerín y de Salvatierra, quinto marqués de Coria, octavo Condestable de Navarra, señor de los estados de Valdecorneja y Huéscar, y de las baronías de Dicastillo, San Martín, Curton y Guissens), (1568 – 29 January 1639) was a Spanish nobleman and politician.

== Biography ==
Antonio was the grandson of the Iron Duke Fernando Álvarez de Toledo, 3rd Duke of Alba and became 5th Duke of Alba when his uncle Fadrique Álvarez de Toledo, 4th Duke of Alba died without an heir. In 1599 Philip III of Spain awarded him the Order of the Golden Fleece.

He was viceroy of Naples between 1622 and 1629. As viceroy, he was confronted with multiple problems: yet another Italian War over the Valtellina valley; a bad harvest and high food prices in 1624; the 1626 Naples earthquake which killed nearly 10,000 people in the town; frequent attacks by Turkish pirates; and constant requisitions of funds and resources by the Count-Duke of Olivares, the prime minister of Spain.

In 1629, King Philip IV of Spain made him his Mayordomo mayor, chief of his Royal Household.

He married Mencía de Mendoza, daughter of Don Íñigo López de Mendoza, Duke del Infantado, and had eight children, including:

- Fernando Álvarez de Toledo y Mendoza (1595–1667), his successor as the 6th Duke of Alba.
- Alonso Álvarez de Toledo y Mendoza, 1st Marquess of Villamagna.
- María Álvarez de Toledo y Mendoza, later married Álvar Pérez Osorio y Manrique, 9th Marquess of Astorga.
- Ana Álvarez de Toledo y Mendoza

== Titles ==
- 5th Duke of Alba, Grandee of Spain
- 3rd Duke of Huéscar
- 6th Marquess of Coria
- 6th Count of Lerín
- 6th Count of Salvatierra
- 8th Constable of Navarre

== Sources ==
- Hobbs, Nicolas (2007). "Grandes de España" (in Spanish). Archived from the original on 25 October 2008.
- Instituto de Salazar y Castro. Elenco de Grandezas y Titulos Nobiliarios Españoles (in Spanish). periodic publication.
- Kamen, Henry (2004). The duke of Alba. New Haven–London: Yale University Press. ISBN 9780300102833.

Spanish nobility
Preceded by Fadrique; Álvarez de Toledo	Duke of Alba, et cetera 1583–1639	Succeeded by Fernando; Álvarez de Toledo
