= Duke of Alba =

Dukedom of Spain

Dukedom of Alba de Tormes
- Creation date: 1472
- Created by: Henry IV of Castile
- Peerage: Spain
- First holder: García Álvarez de Toledo y Carrillo de Toledo, 2nd Count of Alba de Tormes
- Present holder: Carlos Fitz-James Stuart y Martínez de Irujo, 19th Duke of Alba de Tormes
- Heir apparent: Fernando Fitz-James Stuart y Solís, 17th Duke of Huéscar
- Seats: Liria Palace (Madrid); Palacio de las Dueñas (Seville)
- Former seats: Castle of the Dukes of Alba (Alba de Tormes); Palace of the Dukes of Alba (Ávila)

Standard of the Dukedom of Alba

Duke of Alba de Tormes (Spanish: Duque de Alba de Tormes), commonly known as Duke of Alba, is a title of Spanish nobility that is accompanied by the dignity of Grandee of Spain. In 1472, the title of Count of Alba de Tormes, inherited by García Álvarez de Toledo, was elevated to the title of Duke of Alba de Tormes by King Henry IV of Castile. The title's name refers to the municipality of Alba de Tormes in the Province of Salamanca, Spain.

== History ==
The dukedom of Alba de Tormes is one of the most significant noble titles of Spain and gives its name to the House of Alba. Over the centuries, members of three distinct family dynasties have held the title in succession – the House of Álvarez de Toledo, the House of Silva (extinct in 1802) and the House of Fitz-James Stuart, which descends from an illegitimate son of King James II of England.

Famous holders of this dukedom include Don Fernando Álvarez de Toledo, 3rd Duke of Alba, governor of the Spanish Netherlands (references to "Alba" (or "Alva" in Dutch), particularly in the context of Dutch history, are usually about him), and Doña María del Pilar de Silva, 13th Duchess of Alba, a muse of the painter Francisco Goya. When they first met, Francisco Goya was much older than the Duchess of Alba. Goya was in his late 40s and the Duchess was in her early 30s.

Various dukes have married into the families of Christopher Columbus and Cosimo de Medici, as well as the line of the Dukes of Berwick, making them distant relatives of the Earls Spencer and the Dukes of Marlborough.

Today, the ducal family of Alba retains a large and valuable collection of art and historic documents. The largest part of this treasure is kept at the main residence of the family in Madrid, the Liria Palace.

== Lords of Alba de Tormes (1429) ==
- Don Gutierre Álvarez de Toledo, Archbishop of Toledo (also Bishop of Palencia, Archbishop of Seville)
- Don Fernando Álvarez de Toledo, nephew of Gutierre Álvarez de Toledo (created Count of Alba de Tormes in 1439)

== Counts of Alba de Tormes (1439) ==
- Don Fernando Álvarez de Toledo, 1st Count of Alba
- Don García Álvarez de Toledo, 2nd Count of Alba (created Duke of Alba de Tormes in 1472)

== Dukes of Alba de Tormes (1472) ==
Arms of the Dukes of Alba of the House of Álvarez de Toledo

Arms of the Dukes of Alba of the House of Fitz-James Stuart

- 1472-1488: Don García Álvarez de Toledo, 1st Duke of Alba
- 1488-1531: Don Fadrique Álvarez de Toledo, 2nd Duke of Alba
- 1531-1582: Don Fernando Álvarez de Toledo, 3rd Duke of Alba known in The Netherlands as the Iron Duke for his harsh action in the Eighty Years' War
- 1582-1583: Don Fadrique Álvarez de Toledo, 4th Duke of Alba
- 1583-1639: Don Antonio Álvarez de Toledo, 5th Duke of Alba
- 1639-1667: Don Fernando Álvarez de Toledo, 6th Duke of Alba
- 1667-1690: Don Antonio Álvarez de Toledo, 7th Duke of Alba
- 1690-1701: Don Antonio Álvarez de Toledo, 8th Duke of Alba
- 1701-1711: Don Antonio Martín Álvarez de Toledo, 9th Duke of Alba
- 1711-1739: Don Francisco Álvarez de Toledo, 10th Duke of Alba
- 1739-1755: Doña María Teresa Álvarez de Toledo, 11th Duchess of Alba
- 1755-1776: Don Fernando de Silva, 12th Duke of Alba
- 1776-1802: Doña María Teresa de Silva, 13th Duchess of Alba
- 1802-1835: Don Carlos Miguel Fitz-James Stuart, 14th Duke of Alba (see also Duke of Berwick)
- 1847-1881: Don Jacobo Fitz-James Stuart, 15th Duke of Alba
- 1882-1901: Don Carlos María Fitz-James Stuart, 16th Duke of Alba
- 1902-1953: Don Jacobo Fitz-James Stuart, 17th Duke of Alba
- 1955-2014: Doña María del Rosario Cayetana Fitz-James Stuart y Silva, 18th Duchess of Alba
- 2015-present: Don Carlos Fitz-James Stuart y Martínez de Irujo, 19th Duke of Alba

== Genealogy ==
Álvarez de Toledo
García; Lord of Valdecorneja
Fernando; Lord of Valdecorneja (d. 1384)
García; Lord of Valdecorneja (d. 1430)	Gutierre; Lord of Alba de Tormes (1374–1446)
Fernando; Count of Alba de Tormes (1390–1460)
García; 1st Duke of Alba (d. 1488)
Fadrique; 2nd Duke of Alba (d. 1531)
García; Marquess of Coria (d. 1512)
Fernando; 3rd Duke of Alba (1507–1582)
Fadrique; 4th Duke of Alba (1537–1585)	Diego; Count of Lerín (1541–1583)
Antonio; 5th Duke of Alba (1568–1639)
Fernando; 6th Duke of Alba (1595–1667)
Antonio; 7th Duke of Alba (1615–1699)
Antonio; 8th Duke of Alba (1627–1701)	Francisco; 10th Duke of Alba (1662–1739)
Silva
Antonio; 9th Duke of Alba (1669–1711)	María Teresa; 11th Duchess of Alba (1691–1755)	Manuel; 10th Count of Galve (1677-1728)
Fitz-James Stuart
Fernando; 12th Duke of Alba (1714–1776)	María Teresa (1718–1790)	Jacobo Francisco; 3rd Duke of Liria and Jérica (1718–1785)
Francisco de Paula; 10th Duke of Huéscar (1733–1770)	Carlos Bernardo; 4th Duke of Liria and Jérica (1752–1787)
María Teresa; 13th Duchess of Alba (1762–1802)	Jacobo Felipe; 5th Duke of Liria and Jérica (1773–1794)
Carlos Miguel; 14th Duke of Alba (1794–1835)
Jacobo; 15th Duke of Alba (1821–1881)
Carlos; 16th Duke of Alba (1849–1901)
Jacobo; 17th Duke of Alba (1878–1953)
Martínez de Irujo
Cayetana; 18th Duchess of Alba (1926–2014)	Luis (1919–1972)
Carlos; 19th Duke of Alba (b. 1948)
Fernando; 17th Duke of Huéscar (b. 1990)
Rosario (b. 2020)

=== Line of succession ===
- Carlos Miguel Fitz-James Stuart, 14th Duke of Alba (1794–1835)
  - Jacobo Fitz-James Stuart, 15th Duke of Alba (1821-1881)
    - Carlos María Fitz-James Stuart, 16th Duke of Alba (1849–1901)
      - Jacobo Fitz-James Stuart, 17th Duke of Alba (1878–1953)
        - Cayetana Fitz-James Stuart, 18th Duchess of Alba (1926–2014)
          - Carlos Fitz-James Stuart, 19th Duke of Alba (b. 1948)
            - (1) Fernando Fitz-James Stuart, 17th Duke of Huéscar (b. 1990)
              - (2) Rosario Fitz-James Stuart (b. 2020)
              - (3) Sofía Fitz-James Stuart (b. 2023)
              - (4) Fernando Fitz-James Stuart (b. 2025)
            - (5) Carlos Fitz-James Stuart, 22nd Count of Osorno (b. 1991)
              - (6) Carlos Fitz-James Stuart (b. 2024)
              - (7) Fadrique Fitz-James Stuart (b. 2025)
          - (8) Alfonso Martínez de Irujo, 18th Duke of Híjar (b. 1950)
            - (9) Luis Martínez de Irujo, 19th Duke of Aliaga (b. 1978)
              - (10) Mencía Martínez de Irujo (b. 2018)
            - (11) Javier Martínez de Irujo, 20th Marquess of Almenara (b. 1981)
              - (12) Sol Martínez de Irujo (b. 2011)
              - (13) Alfonso Martínez de Irujo (b. 2013)
          - (14) Jacobo Fitz-James Stuart, 14th Count of Siruela (b. 1954)
            - (15) Jacobo Fitz James-Stuart (b. 1981)
              - (16) Asela Fitz-James-Stuart (b. 2012)
              - (17) Jacobo Fitz-James-Stuart (b. 2015)
            - (18) Brianda Fitz James-Stuart (b. 1984)
              - (19) Merlín Lozano (b. 2022)
          - (20) Fernando Martínez de Irujo, 12th Marquess of San Vicente del Barco (b. 1959)
          - (21) Cayetano Martínez de Irujo, 4th Duke of Arjona (b. 1963)
            - (22) Luis Martínez de Irujo (b. 2001)
            - (23) Amina Martínez de Irujo (b. 2001)
          - (24) Eugenia Martínez de Irujo, 12th Duchess of Montoro (b. 1968)
            - (25) Cayetana Rivera (b. 1999)
      - María Eugenia Sol María Fitz-James Stuart, 20th Countess of Teba (1880-1962) → County of Teba etc.
      - Hernando Fitz-James Stuart, 18th Duke of Peñaranda (1882-1936) → Dukedom of Peñaranda etc.
    - María de la Asunción Fitz-James Stuart, 1st Duchess of Galisteo (1851-1927) → Dukedom of Galisteo, Dukedom of Tamames etc.

== Bibliography ==
- Hidalgos de España, Real Asociación de (2018). Elenco de Grandezas y Títulos Nobiliarios Españoles. Ediciones Hidalguía. ISBN 978-84-94841-02-6.
