= García Álvarez de Toledo, 1st Duke of Alba =

Spanish nobleman

The Most Excellent García Álvarez de Toledo 1st Duke of Alba
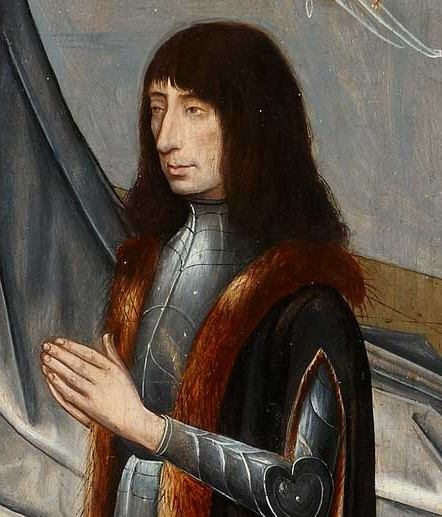
- Born: García Álvarez de Toledo y Carrillo de Toledo c. 1424
- Died: 20 June 1488
- Spouse: María Enríquez de Quiñones
- Parents: Fernando Álvarez de Toledo, 1st Count of Alba de Tormes (father); Mencía Carrillo de Toledo (mother)
- Family: House of Alba

García Álvarez de Toledo y Carrillo de Toledo, 1st Duke of Alba de Tormes (c. 1424 – 20 June 1488) was a Spanish nobleman, military leader and politician, whose family had presided over the lands of Alba de Tormes since the year 1369.

== Biography ==
He was the son of Fernando Álvarez de Toledo, 1st Count of Alba de Tormes and of Mencía Carrillo de Toledo, Lady of Bercimuelle

In 1470 The title of duke was granted to Garcia Alvarez de Toledo. In 1472, King Henry IV of Castile elevated the County of Alba de Tormes into a hereditary Duchy.

The first Duke of Alba fought in the War of the Castilian Succession on the side of the future Queen Isabella I of Castille against her niece, Juana la Beltraneja.

== Marriage and issue ==
In 1448, he married María Enríquez de Quiñones, daughter of Fadrique Enríquez, Admiral of Castile, with whom he had 5 sons and 4 daughters.

They had the following children:

- Fadrique Álvarez de Toledo, 2nd Duke of Alba (1460–1531)
- Mencía de Toledo, married Beltrán de la Cueva, 1st Duke of Alburquerque
- Teresa de Toledo, married Pedro Fernández Manrique, 2nd Count de Osorno
- Francisca Álvarez de Toledo, married Francisco Fernández de la Cueva, 2nd Duke of Alburquerque
- María de Toledo, married Gómez Suárez de Figueroa, 2nd Count of Feria
- Gutierre Álvarez de Toledo, Bishop of Plasencia
- García Álvarez de Toledo, 1st Lord of la Orcaiada
- Pedro de Toledo, 1st Lord of Mancera
- Fernando de Toledo, 1st Lord of las Villorias

A granddaughter, María de Toledo y Rojas, married Diego Colón, son of Christopher Columbus.

== Ancestry ==
8. Fernando Álvarez de Toledo; 2nd Lord of Valdecorneja
4. García Álvarez de Toledo; 3rd Lord of Valdecorneja
9. Leonor de Ayala
2. Fernando Álvarez de Toledo; 1st Count of Alba de Tormes
10. Pedro Ruiz de Sarmiento; 1st Lord of Rivadavia
5. Constanza de Sarmiento
11. Juana de Guzmán
1. García Álvarez de Toledo
12. Gomez Carrillo de Toledo
6. Pedro Carrillo de Toledo; Lord of Bolaños
13. Mayor Fernandez Coronel
3. Mencía Carrillo de Toledo; Lady of Bercimuelle
14. Tello Garcia Palomeque
7. Elvira Palomeque
15. Marquesa Diaz de Aza

== See also ==
- House of Alba
- Henry IV of Castile
- Joanna La Beltraneja
- Isabella I of Castile
- Alfonso of Castile, Prince of Asturias
- War of the Castilian Succession

García Álvarez de Toledo, 1st Duke of Alba House of Alba Born: c. 1424 Died: 20 June 1488
Spanish nobility
New title	Duke of Alba; 1472–1488	Succeeded by Fadrique Álvarez de Toledo
Preceded by Gutierre de Cáceres	Marquis of Coria; 1469–1488	Succeeded by Fadrique Álvarez de Toledo

== Bibliography ==
- Hobbs, Nicolas (2007). "Grandes de España" (in Spanish).
- Instituto de Salazar y Castro. Elenco de Grandezas y Titulos Nobiliarios Españoles (in Spanish). periodic publication.
