= Count of Lerín =

Countship of Lerín
- Creation date: 25 August 1424
- Created by: Charles III
- Peerage: Peerage of Spain
- First holder: Luis de Beaumont, 1st Count of Lerín
- Present holder: Carlos Fitz-James Stuart y Martínez de Irujo, 21st Count of Lerín

Count of Lerín (Spanish: Conde de Lerín) is a hereditary title in the Peerage of Spain accompanied by the dignity of Grandee and of Constable of Navarre, granted in 1424 by Charles III to Luis de Beaumont, grandchild of Louis of Évreux and a great-grandchild of Joan III of Navarre. The title's name refers to the municipality of Lerín in the province and autonomous community of Navarre, Spain.

== Counts of Lerín ==
1. Luis de Beaumont, 1st Count of Lerín
2. Luis de Beaumont, 2nd Count of Lerín
3. Luis de Beaumont, 3rd Count of Lerín
4. Luis de Beaumont, 4th Count of Lerín
5. Brianda de Beaumont, 5th Countess of Lerín
6. Antonio Álvarez de Toledo, 6th Count of Lerín
7. Fernando Álvarez de Toledo y Mendoza, 7th Count of Lerín
8. Antonio Álvarez de Toledo y Enriquez de Ribera, 8th Count of Lerín
9. Antonio Álvarez de Toledo y Fernández de Velasco, 9th Count of Lerín
10. Antonio Martín Álvarez de Toledo y Guzmán, 10th Count of Lerín
11. Nicolás Álvarez de Toledo y Ponce de León, 11th Count of Lerín
12. Francisco Álvarez de Toledo y Silva, 12th Count of Lerín
13. María Teresa Álvarez de Toledo y Haro, 13th Countess of Lerín
14. Fernando de Silva y Álvarez de Toledo, 14th Count of Lerín
15. María Cayetana de Silva y Álvarez de Toledo, 15th Countess of Lerín
16. Carlos Miguel Fitz-James Stuart y Silva, 16th Count of Lerín
17. Jacobo Fitz-James Stuart y Ventimiglia, 17th Count of Lerín
18. Carlos María Fitz-James Stuart y Portocarrero, 18th Count of Lerín
19. Jacobo Fitz-James Stuart y Falcó, 19th Count of Lerín
20. Cayetana Fitz-James Stuart y Silva, 20th Countess of Lerín
21. Carlos Fitz-James Stuart y Martínez de Irujo, 21st Count of Lerín

== See also ==
- List of current grandees of Spain
