= Villacidaler =

Coordinates: 42°13′N 4°58′W

- municipality
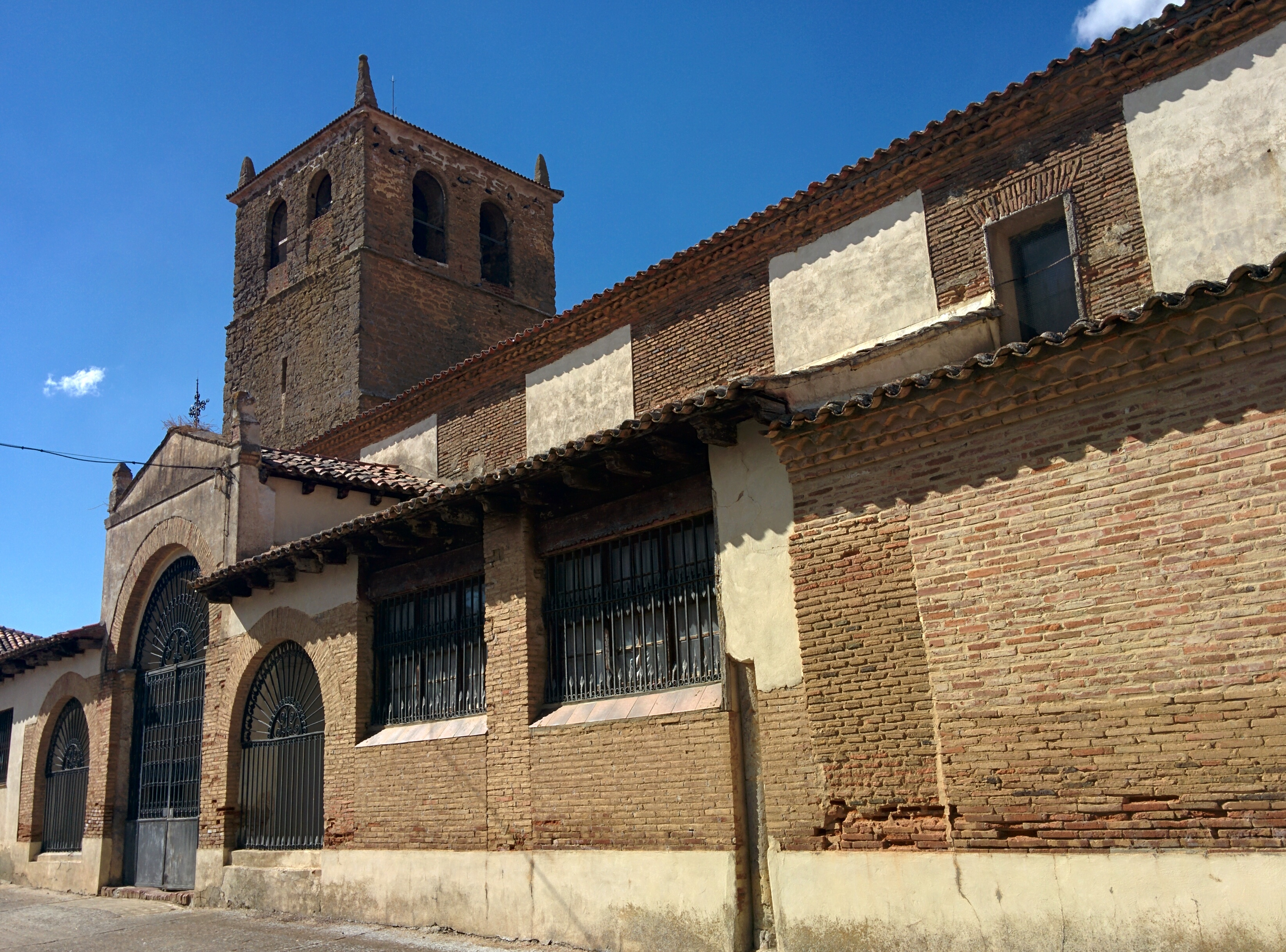
- Interactive map of Villacidaler
- Country: Spain
- Autonomous community: Castile and León
- Province: Palencia
- Municipality: Villacidaler

Area
  - Total: 21 km^{2} (8.1 sq mi)

Population (2025-01-01)
  - Total: 44
  - Density: 2.1/km^{2} (5.4/sq mi)
- Time zone: UTC+1 (CET)
  - Summer (DST): UTC+2 (CEST)
- Website: Official website

Villacidaler is a municipality located in the province of Palencia, Castile and León, Spain. According to the 2018 census (INE), the municipality has a population of 48 inhabitants.
