= Antonio Álvarez de Toledo y Enríquez de Ribera =

Spanish noble and politician

Antonio Álvarez de Toledo y Enríquez de Ribera, 7th Duke of Alba (Madrid, 26 February 1615 – Madrid, 11 November 1690) was a Spanish noble and politician. He was Viceroy of Navarre, president of the Council of Italy and a Knight in the Order of the Golden Fleece.

== Biography ==
He was the only son of Fernando Álvarez de Toledo Mendoza, VI Duke of Alba, and his first wife, Antonia Enríquez de Ribera Álvarez de Toledo, IV Marchioness of Villanueva del Río.
His mother already died in 1623. When his father died on 7 October 1667, Antonio also succeeded to the titles of Duke of Huéscar (V), Count of Lerín (VII), Marquis of Coria (X), Marquis of Villanueva del Río (VI), Count of Salvatierra de Tormes (VII), Count of Piedrahíta (VI), Duke of Galisteo (IV) and Count of Osorno (IX).

Due to his father's powerful personality, Antonio had long been aloof from political life, except in 1661, when he had been appointed Viceroy of Navarre for a few months. When Antonio became the new Duke of Alba, he was a staunch supporter of the King's powerful illegitimate brother, John Joseph of Austria.

He became Mayordomo mayor of King Charles II of Spain in 1667, a member of the Councils of State and War in 1674 and President of the Council of Italy in 1677.

He was also awarded the Order of the Golden Fleece in 1675.

== Marriage and children ==
He married first in 1626 to Mariana Fernández de Velasco, daughter of Juan Fernández de Velasco y Tovar, 5th Duke of Frías. They had 2 children :

- Antonio Álvarez de Toledo y Fernández de Velasco, 8th Duke of Alba (1627–1701), inherited the dukedom and other titles on the death of his father, the 7th Duke of Alba, in 1690
  - Antonio Martín Álvarez de Toledo y Guzmán, 9th Duke of Alba (1669–1711), inherited the dukedom and other titles on the death of his father, the 8th Duke of Alba, in 1701
- María Álvarez de Toledo y Fernández de Velasco, married Nicolás María de Guzmán y Caraffa, 3rd Duke of Medina de las Torres

Widowed in 1650, he remarried in Madrid to Guiomar de Silva Mendoza Corella, on 22 September 1656, daughter of the 1st Marquis of Orani. They had one son:

- Francisco Álvarez de Toledo y Silva, 10th Duke of Alba (1662–1739), inherited the dukedom and other titles on the death of his half-nephew, the 9th Duke of Alba, in 1711
