= Fadrique Álvarez de Toledo, 2nd Duke of Alba =

Spanish nobleman

The Most Excellent Fadrique Álvarez de Toledo 2nd Duke of Alba GE
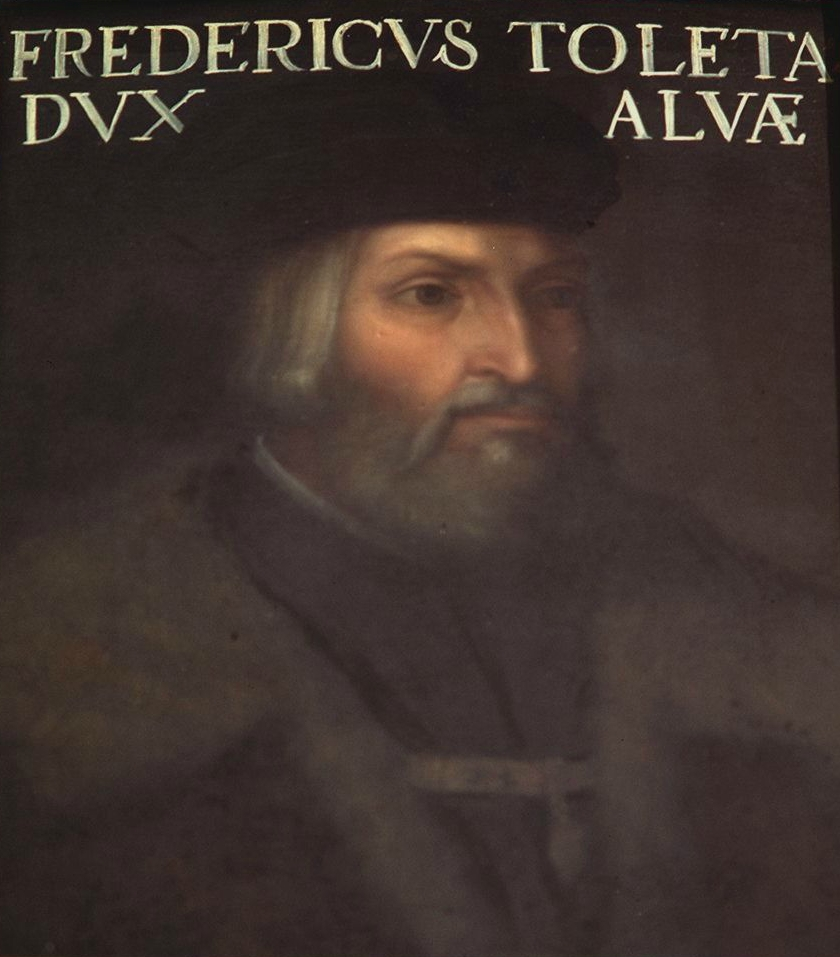
- Born: Fadrique Álvarez de Toledo y Enríquez c. 1460
- Died: 19 October 1531
- Spouse: Isabel de Zúñiga y Pimentel
- Parents: García Álvarez de Toledo, 1st Duke of Alba (father); María Enríquez de Quiñones (mother)
- Family: House of Alba

Fadrique Álvarez de Toledo y Enríquez, 2nd Duke of Alba (in full, Spanish: Don Fadrique Álvarez de Toledo y Enríquez de Quiñones, segundo Duque de Alba de Tormes, segundo marqués de Coria, conde de Salvatierra, señor del estado de Valdecorneja y del estado de Huéscar) (c. 1460 – 19 October 1531) was a Spanish nobleman, military leader and politician.

== Life and career ==
He was the eldest son of García Álvarez de Toledo, 1st Duke of Alba, and his wife, María Enríquez de Quiñones, daughter of Fadrique Enríquez de Mendoza and younger half-sister to Juana Enríquez, Queen of Aragon.

Fadrique was very close to the Catholic Monarchs. His father had fought in the War of the Castilian Succession on the side of the future Queen Isabella I of Castille against her niece Juana la Beltraneja, and his mother was the younger half-sister of Juana Enríquez y Fernandez de Cordoba, making him the first cousin of Ferdinand II of Aragon.

He participated in the conquest of the Emirate of Granada, and already as Duke, he led the Spanish army against the French in Roussillon in 1503. When Ferdinand II as regent of Castilla, decided to invade and conquer the Kingdom of Navarre, supported by a Papal bull, he put the Duke of Alba at the head of his army. Fadrique conquered Navarre in only two weeks time. As a reward, he was promoted to capitan general of Andalucía and Duke of Huescar in 1513.

He was also a member of the Consejo de Estado under Charles V, Holy Roman Emperor. He accompanied the Emperor to Germany, Flanders and Italy and was made in 1520 a grandee of Spain and a knight in the Order of the Golden Fleece.

He married Isabel de Zúñiga (1470-after 1520), Condesa de Sevilla, in 1480 and had five children. His eldest son García was destined to be his successor, but predeceased his father, passing the title of third Duke of Alba to Fadrique's grandson, the famous Iron Duke Fernando Álvarez de Toledo y Pimentel.

His offspring:

- 1) Leonor Álvarez de Toledo, married Rodrigo Portocarrero.
- 2) Garcia Álvarez de Toledo y Zuniga (1489–1510), Marquess of Coria, married Beatriz Pimentel:
  - Catalina Álvarez de Toledo y Pimentel, married Diego Enríquez de Velasco, 3rd Count of Alba de Liste.
  - Maria Álvarez de Toledo y Pimentel, married her cousin Enrique Enríquez de Toledo, 4th Count of Alba de Liste.
  - Fernando Álvarez de Toledo y Pimentel, 3rd Duke of Alba.
- 3) Pedro Álvarez de Toledo y Zúñiga (1484–1553), Viceroy of Naples, married María Osorio y Pimentel:
  - García Álvarez de Toledo, 4th Marquis of Villafranca), Viceroy of Naples.
  - Eleanor of Toledo, married Cosimo I de' Medici, Grand Duke of Tuscany.
- 4) Aldonza Leonor Álvarez de Toledo y Zuniga, married Diego Enríquez de Velasco, 3rd Count of Alba de Liste.
- 5) Juan Álvarez de Toledo (1488–1557), cardinal.

== Additional information ==
=== See also ===
- House of Alba
- Charles V, Holy Roman Emperor
- Joanna La Beltraneja
- Isabella I of Castile
- Ferdinand II of Aragon
- War of the Castilian Succession

=== Sources ===
- Hobbs, Nicolas (2007). "Grandes de España" (in Spanish).
- Instituto de Salazar y Castro. Elenco de Grandezas y Titulos Nobiliarios Españoles (in Spanish). periodic publication.

Fadrique Álvarez de Toledo, 2nd Duke of Alba House of Alba Born: c. 1460 Died: 1531
Spanish nobility
| Preceded by García; Álvarez de Toledo | Duke of Alba; 1488–1531 | Succeeded by Fernando; Álvarez de Toledo |
