= Uceda =

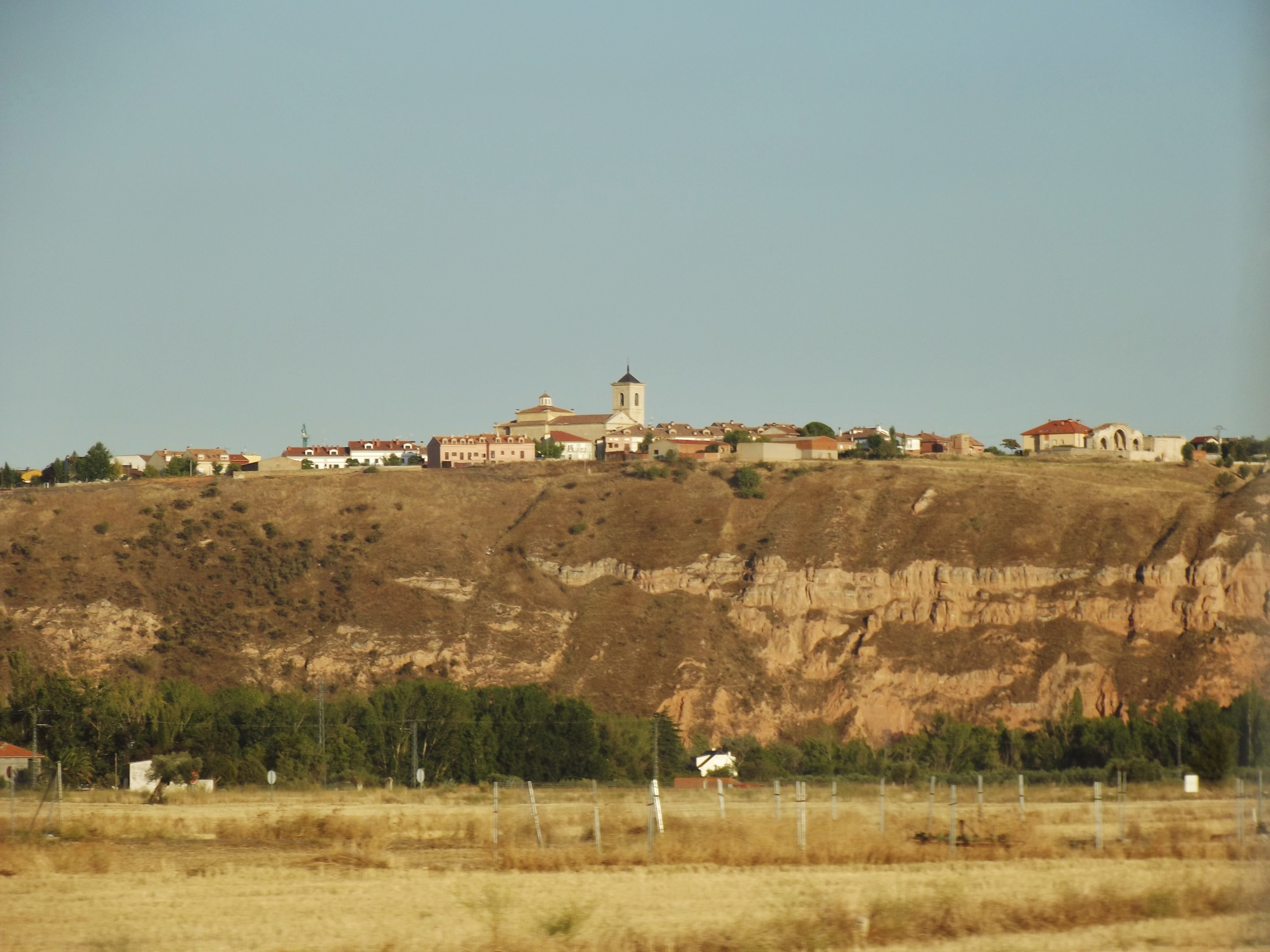

- Coat of arms

- Location within Province of Guadalajara Location within Castilla-La Mancha Location within Spain
- Coordinates: 40°50′37″N 3°27′43″W
- Country: Spain
- Autonomous community: Castile-La Mancha
- Province: Guadalajara
- Municipality: Uceda

Area
  - Total: 47 km^{2} (18 sq mi)

Population (2025-01-01)
  - Total: 3,400
  - Density: 72/km^{2} (190/sq mi)
- Time zone: UTC+1 (CET)
  - Summer (DST): UTC+2 (CEST)

Uceda is a municipality located in the province of Guadalajara, Castile-La Mancha, Spain. According to the 2004 census (INE), the municipality has a population of 1,575 inhabitants. The church of Santa María de la Varga stands in the town.
