= Cipriano de Valera =

Spanish Protestant Reformer and refugee

The Reverend Cipriano de Valera
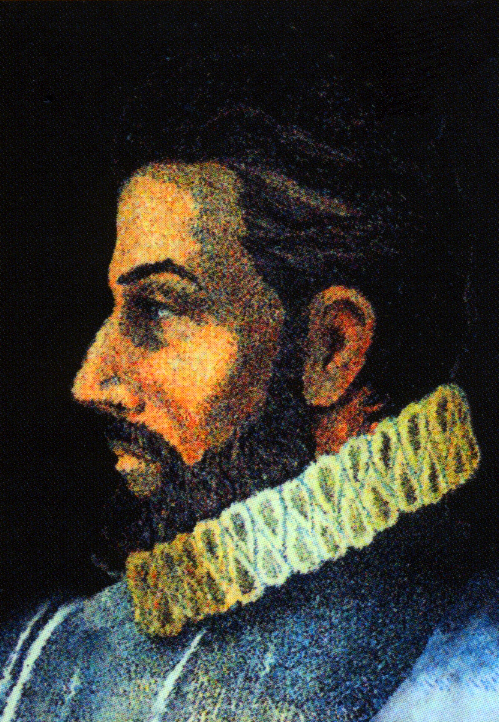
- Cipriano de Valera, La Biblia del Siglo de Oro
- Born: 1531; Nertobriga, Fregenal de la Sierra, Badajoz, Extremadura, Spain
- Died: c.1602 (aged 71)
- Education: University of Seville
- Occupation: Theologian
- Notable work: Reina-Valera Bible

Signature
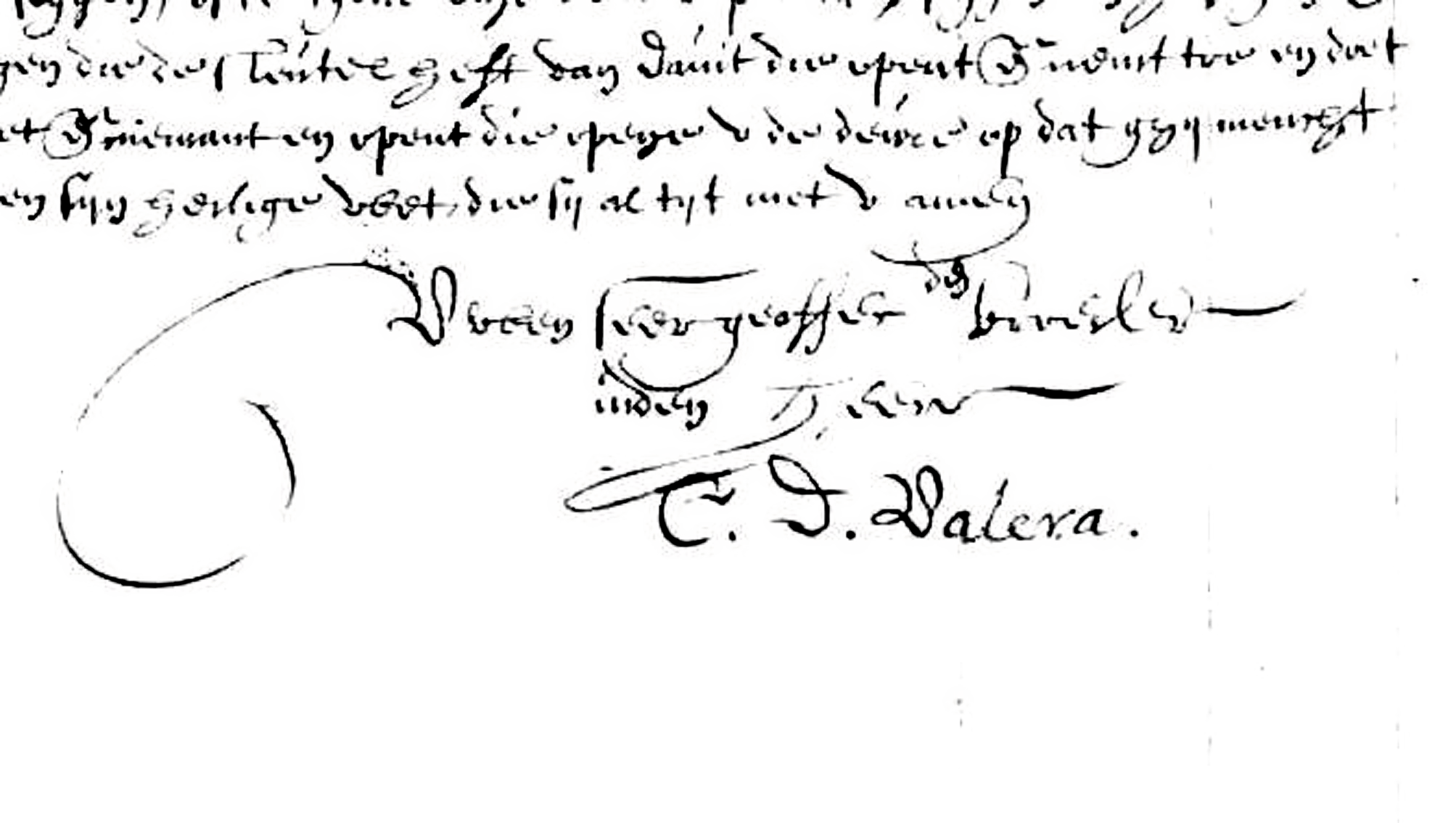

Cipriano de Valera (1531–1602) was a Spanish Protestant Reformer, academic and refugee who edited the first major revision of Casiodoro de Reina's Spanish Bible, which has become known as the Reina Valera version, as well as several other notable works.

== Biography ==
=== Early life and conversion ===
Valera was born at Valera la Vieja in Fregenal de la Sierra. He was a student for about six years at the University of Seville studying dialectics and philosophy, where he was influenced by the sermons of Giles of Viterbo amongst others. After graduation, Valera became a monk in the Order of the Hieronymites and lived at the Monastery of San Isidoro, where he adopted the surname 'de Valera' as per Hieronymite practice.

Due to the influence of the Reformation in nearby Seville, Valera and most of the other monks at San Isidoro accepted Protestant teachings. He was among 22 of the 40 monks in the monastery who were accused of heresy. 12 fled to Geneva, including Casiodoro de Reina, Antonio del Corro and Valera. Of those that remained, 40 were burned to death in autos-da-fé by 1562; Valera was tried in absentia and his effigy was burned at the stake.

=== Geneva and England ===
Valera first went to Geneva in 1557, where he was influenced by the work of John Calvin and joined the Italian Protestant congregation and later a congregation of Spanish exiles there. Upon the accession of Elizabeth I, Valera traveled to England, where his degree was incorporated by the University of Cambridge in 1559, and where he taught theology; he became a Fellow of Magdalene College in 1560, where his compatriot Francisco de Enzinas had held a fellowship before the Marian persecutions. Later, in 1565, the University of Oxford also granted him an M.A.

In 1567, Valera moved to London, where he is described as a 'Master of Divinitie' and 'schoolmaster' in 1571, and where he attended the Italian stranger church.

In 1559, Valera assisted with the writing of the Spanish Confession of London along with Reina and others, which sought to stress the theological orthodoxy of the Spanish and Italian Protestant communities in London, in response to the writings of Michael Servetus and Sebastian Castellio on the Trinity.

After the failure of the Spanish Armada, Valera started to write several works himself, being patronized to do so. The earliest was The Two Treatises on the Pope and on the Mass (1588), the first original Spanish work to be printed in England, in which he criticized elements of the Catholic Mass as pagan, and argued that if the Spanish could better understand the Bible they would be able to challenge the claimed authority of the papacy.

His others works included A Treatise for the Purpose of Confirming in their Christian Faith the Captives of the Barbary Pirates (1594). It is said by some to reflect his evangelistic work among seamen and prisoners; it has also been suggested that the captives in the text represent Spanish Christians and that the Barbary pirates are the clergy of the Catholic Church.

=== Later life and death ===
Later in his life, in 1597, Valera translated Calvin's Institutes. Most famously, over a 20-year period Valera amended Casiodoro de Reina's Spanish Bible to reflect the Spanish vernacular; the result has become known as the Reina Valera Bible. Valera travelled to Leiden in 1602 with a printer to present the first copy to Maurice of Nassau and the States General of the Netherlands, from where it was published.

Due to these various works, Valera was listed in the Catholic Index Librorum Prohibitorum and was called "el hereje español" ("the Spanish heretic") par excellence. Valera died in 1602.

== Personal life ==
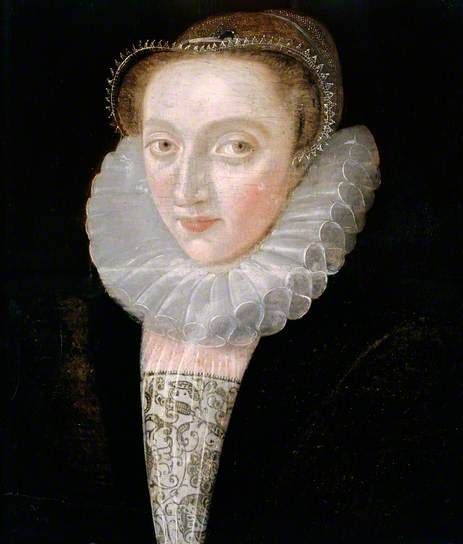
Portrait of Judith de Valera, c.1590, Geffrye Museum, London

In 1564, Valera married Ana, an Englishwoman, with whom he had two sons, Juan and Isaac, and one daughter, Judith, who married Thomas Kingsmill (professor), the Regius Professor of Hebrew at the University of Oxford, and had issue. Juan Cipriano de Valera served as secretary to Sir Francis Walsingham.

== Quotations ==
"Therefore, open your eyes, O Spaniards, and forsaking those who deceive you, obey Christ and His Word which alone is firm and unchangeable for ever. Establish and found your faith on the true foundation of the Prophets and Apostles and sole Head of His Church" (Introduction to Valera's translation of Calvin's Institutes, 1597)

"The reason for my motivation in making this edition, was the same that motivated Casiodoro de Reina, who had been motivated by that hallowed Person, the Lord Himself. He desired to proclaim the glory of God and to make a clear service to his nation. Therefore, he began to translate the Holy Bible (into Spanish)" (Introduction to the Reina-Valera Bible, 1602)

== Works ==
- Two Treatises Concerning the Pope & the Mass (London), 1588
- Treatise to Strengthen the Barbary Captives (London), 1594
- The New Testament (London), 1596
- Translation of John Calvin's Catechism (London), 1596
- Translation of John Calvin's Institutes of the Christian Religion (London), 1597
- Swarm of False Miracles (London), 1598
- Translation of William Perkins' The Reformed Christian (London), 1599
- Notice to the Church Concerning Jubilees (London), 1600
- Reina Valera Bible (Amsterdam), 1602

== See also ==
- Bible translations

== Bibliography ==
- Hauben, Paul J. (1967). Antonio Del Corro, Cassiodoro De Reina, Cypriano De Valera. Geneva: Droz.
- Hutton, L. J. (1958). "A Spanish Heretic: Cipriano de Valera". Church History. Vol. 27. pp. 23–31.
- Kinder, A. Gordon (1988). "Religious Literature as an Offensive Weapon: Cipriano de Valera's Part in England's War With Spain". The Sixteenth Century Journal. 14 (2): 223–235. doi:10.2307/2540408. JSTOR 2540408.
- Menéndez Pelayo, Marcelino (1956). Historia de los heterodoxos españoles (in Spanish). Vol. IV. Madrid: La Editorial Católica. pp. 323–329.
