= Bible translations into Portuguese =

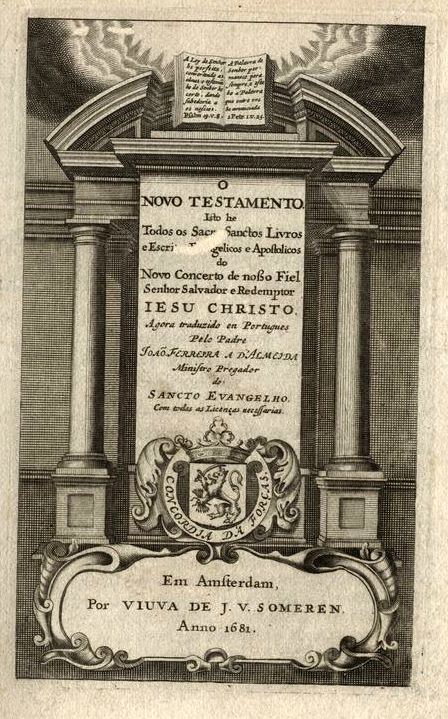
The first edition of the Bible in Portuguese (1681)

Although the biblical themes have been an essential formative substance of the Portuguese culture, composition in that language of a complete translation of the Bible is quite late when compared with other European languages. The beginnings of the written transmission of the sacred text in Portuguese, parallel to its traditional liturgical use in Latin, are related to the progressive social acceptance of the vernacular as a language of culture in the low-medieval period. And even though the official language of the Portuguese monarchy dates back to the end of the thirteenth century, during the reign of Dinis I, the writer Carolina Michaëlis de Vasconcelos (1851–1925), for example, was able to state categorically that, in the medieval period, "Portuguese literature, in matters of biblical translations, is a poverty Desperate" – a judgment that remains valid, experts say.

The first complete translation of the Bible into Portuguese was composed from the mid-seventeenth century, in specific regions of Southeast Asia under the domination of the Dutch East India Company. The man responsible for its elaboration process was João Ferreira Annes d'Almeida (c. 1628–1691), native of the Kingdom of Portugal, but resident among the Dutch since his youth. A first edition of his New Testament translation was printed in Amsterdam in the year 1681, in the passage that the books of the Old Testament were published from the eighteenth century onwards in Tranquebar and Batavia.

== Medieval period ==
The first known partial translation of the Bible was ordered by Dinis of Portugal, known as the Bible of D. Dinis. This version enjoyed great readership during his reign. It is a translation of the first 20 chapters of Genesis, from the Vulgate. There were also translations carried out by the monks of the Alcobaça Monastery, more specifically the book of Acts of the Apostles.

D. John I of Portugal ordered that the Bible was translated again in the vernacular. Much of the New Testament and the Psalms, translated by the king himself, were published. His granddaughter, D. Filipa, translated the gospel from French. Bernardo de Alcobaça translated Matthew and Gonçalo Garcia of Santa Maria translated parts of the New Testament.

In 1491 the Pentateuch is printed along with the Syrian Targum and the Greek of Onquelos. The typographer Valentim Fernandes prints De Vita Christi , a harmony of the Gospels. The "Gospels and Epistles", compiled by Guilherme de Paris and addressed to the clergy, are printed by typographer Rodrigo Álvares. In a painting by Nuno Gonçalves, a rabbi appears holding an open Torah.

In 1505, Queen Leonor ordered the translation of Acts of the Apostles and the Epistles of James, Peter, John and Judas. Father Antonio Ribeiro dos Santos is responsible for translations of the Gospels of Matthew and Gospel of Mark. In 1529 it was published in Lisbon a translation of Psalms done by Gómez de Santofímia, that had a 2nd edition in 1535. It is quite possible, due to the proximity to Spain, that translations in Spanish were known, such as those of João Pérez de Piñeda, Francisco de Enzinas. Father Jesuit Luís Brandão translated the four Gospels.

During the Inquisition there was a great diminution of the translations of the Bible into Portuguese. The Inquisition, from 1547 prohibited the possession of Bibles in vernacular languages, allowing only the Latin Vulgate, and with serious restrictions.

Around 1530, António Pereira Marramaque, from an illustrious family in Cabeceiras de Basto, wrote about the usefulness of vernacular Bible translation. A few years later, he was denounced to the Inquisition for possessing a Bible in the vulgar tongue.

A translation of the Pentateuch was published in Constantinople in 1547, made by Jews expelled from Portugal and Castile. Abraham Usque, a Portuguese Jew, translated and published a translation known as the Ferrara Bible, in Spanish. It was published in Ferrara because of persecution.

== Versão de João Ferreira de Almeida (Almeida Version) ==
It was not until 1753 that a complete version of the Bible (apart from the deuterocanonical books) was published in Portuguese. This version was initiated by João Ferreira de Almeida (1628 –1691). Born in Torres de Tavares, Portugal, he moved in 1642, at the age of 14, first to the Netherlands, and then to Malacca in Malaysia, which had been a Portuguese possession from 1511 but had fallen to the Dutch in 1641. Having become a Protestant, he worked with the local Dutch Reformed Church. Two years later, at the age of 16, Almeida began translating the New Testament from Spanish to Portuguese.

In 1651, Almeida became a chaplain of the Reformed presbytery of Dutch-ruled Batavia, the city that since 1942 is called Jakarta. There he studied theology and edited the parts of the New Testament that he had previously translated. The Portuguese Inquisition ordered some of his writings to be burned publicly. In 1663 he began studying Greek and Hebrew, which allowed him to better translate the Bible into Portuguese.

In 1676, he completed his translation of the New Testament on the basis of the 1633 Elzevir Textus Receptus. He then fought a long battle to get it published, meeting resistance from the Dutch Reformed Church and the Dutch East India Company, which wished to make it conform to the 1637 translation into Dutch. He sent his text to the Netherlands, where it was printed in 1681. When copies of this printing reached Batavia, it was found to be laden with errors; the copies still in the Netherlands were destroyed, and orders were sent to destroy also the copies that had already been delivered. One of the copies that escaped destruction and that was used with the addition of handwritten corrections is preserved in the British Museum. The revision took ten more years before it was ready for publication. The revised second edition appeared in 1691, after Almeida's death.

Meanwhile, Almeida began translating the Old Testament. When he died in 1691, he had translated as far as Book of Ezekiel 48:21. In 1694, Dutch Pastor Jacobus op den Akker completed the translation of the Old Testament. It underwent many changes before finally being published in two volumes, the first in 1748, the second in 1753, thus completing what is known as the Tradução de João Ferreira de Almeida, the Version of João Ferreira de Almeida. Portuguese thus became the thirteenth modern language into which the Bible was translated after the Protestant Reformation.

In 1819 the British and Foreign Bible Society published the Almeida Version in a single volume.

Later editions of the Almeida Version, the first of which was published by the British and Foreign Bible Society in 1898, depart from its dependence on the Textus Receptus of the New Testament and take account to a greater or lesser extent of advances in textual criticism, making it conform more closely to what is today accepted as the original Greek text. An exception is the 1994 edition of the Trinitarian Bible Society of Brazil, which is associated with the Trinitarian Bible Society and is not to be confused with the Bible Society of Brazil, the publisher of "revised and corrected" and "revised and updated" editions of Almeida in 1917, 1956, 1969, 1993, 1995 and 2009. None of these editions contain the deuterocanonical books.

== Pereira Version ==
A complete translation of the Bible, including the deuterocanonical books, by the Catholic priest Antônio Pereira de Figueiredo, was published as a whole in seven volumes in 1790, after appearing in instalments during the preceding 18 years, beginning in 1778. It was based on the Vulgate.

The British and Foreign Bible Society published the full text as a single volume in 1821 and brought out an edition lacking the deuterocanonical books in 1827.

Since this translation was done a century later than that of Almeida, its language was more modern and more accessible for the ordinary reader.

== Later versions ==
=== Partial translations ===
In 1847 Bishop Joaquim de Nossa Senhora de Nazaré published in São Luís, Maranhão, Brazil a translation of the New Testament based on the Vulgate.

At the end of the 19th century, in Portugal Father António Ribeiro dos Santos translated the Gospels of Matthew and Mark from the Vulgate.

A translation of the Psalms by F.R. dos Santos Saraiva appear in 1898 under the title Harpa de Israel (Harp of Israel).

Duarte Leopoldo e Silva published a translation of the Gospels in the form of a harmony. A translation of the Gospels and the Acts of the Apostles by a priest of the College of the Immaculate Conception, Botafogo appeared in 1904. 1909 saw publication of work by Franciscan friars, and of a translation by Father Santana of the Gospel of Matthew directly from the Greek language.

The New Testament in a translation from the Vulgate by J.L. Assunção appeared in 1917 and a translation of the Psalms by J. Basílio Pereira in 1923.

Huberto Rohden published a translation of the New Testament in 1930.

Rabbi Meir Matzliah Melamed published in 1962 a translation of the Torah under the title A Lei de Moisés e as Haftarot. A revised edition appeared in 2001 as A Lei de Moisés.

Baptist Minister Fridolin Janzen published in 2005 a translation of the New Testament based on the Textus Receptus.

Adolfo Wasserman's translation of the Living Torah, under the title of A Torah Viva appeared in 2001. A translation by David Gorodovits and Jairo Fridlin of the Hebrew Bible (the Tanakh) was published in 2006.

=== Complete translations ===
In the middle of the 18th century, Pedro Rahmeyer, a native of Hamburg who had been living in Lisbon for 30 years, made a translation of the Bible, presumably from German, into Portuguese. It has never been published. The manuscript is in the Senate Museum in Hamburg.

At the start of the 20th century, the Brazilian Translation (Tradução Brasileira) was produced, with assistance from the American Bible Society, by members of various Protestant denominations, including H. C. Tucker (Methodist), William Cabell Brown (Episcopalian), Eduardo Carlos Pereira (Presbyterian). The Gospels of Matthew and Mark appeared in 1904. A revision of Matthew was published in 1905. The four Gospels and the Acts of the Apostles appeared in 1906 and the whole of the New Testament in 1910. Finally the whole Bible, without the deuterocanonical books, came in 1917. It stayed rather close to the original texts, which in the eyes of people accustomed to the Almeida Version was a drawback. Another difficulty was its abandonment of the traditional Portuguese form of the Old Testament names, which were replaced by form closer to the Hebrew original, as in English.

In 1932–1942, a translation by Father Mathos Soares, based relatively freely on the Vulgate, was published by Edições Paulinas. It became the most popular version in Brazil.

In 1958, the Ave Maria publishing house in São Paulo produced a complete Bible based on the French version of the Benedictine monks of Maredsous Abbey, Belgium. The Franciscan João José Pedreira de Castro, of the São Paulo Bible Centre, was the coordinator of the work of producing the Portuguese version.

In 1967, Edições Paulinas presented a complete Bible in Portuguese adapted from the Italian version of the Pontifical Biblical Institute in Rome.

A joint group of Portuguese Catholics and Protestants began publication of the Tradução Interconfessional em Português Corrente in 1972. A revised edition appeared in 2002.

A Portuguese edition of the Jerusalem Bible, with notes and commentaries translated from the French edition but, as in the English edition, with the text translated directly from the original languages, was published in 1981. A revised edition, known as the Nova Bíblia de Jerusalém (cf. New Jerusalem Bible) appeared in 2002.

A commission led by the Franciscan Ludovico Garmus produced in 1982 a complete Bible, published by Vozes, and another translation was provided by the Santuário publishing house in the same year.

In 1983, Edições Loyola published the Bíblia Mensagem de Deus (Message of God Bible).

1988 saw publication of A Bíblia na Linguagem de Hoje (The Bible in Today's Language), which was criticized as departing too far from the original text. As a result of these criticisms, it underwent a lengthy revision, leading to the appearance of the Nova Tradução na Linguagem de Hoje (New Version in Today's Language) without the deuterocanonical books in 2000, and including them in 2003.

The Edição Pastoral (Pastoral Edition) of 1990, coordinated by Ivo Storniolo, was associated with the liberation theology movement. Its use was widespread enough to inspire a group of Biblical scholars to undertake a complete translation, based on but revising the translation of the passages included in the Lectionary for Mass. This translation was published in 2001 under the auspices of the Conferência Nacional dos Bispos do Brasil, the Brazilian bishops conference, and published by a consortium of seven publishing houses. It soon went through several printings, with revisions of the notes and diagrams.

In 1997, a commission comprising Catholics, Protestants and Jews produced the Tradução Ecumênica da Bíblia (Ecumenical Version), based on the French Traduction œcuménique de la Bible, with the Old Testament presented as in Jewish Bibles.

2001 also saw the publication of the New International Version in Portuguese (Nova Versão Internacional), the New Testament of which appeared in 1983.

The Bíblia do Peregrino (Pilgrim's Bible), translated from the Spanish by Luís Alonso Schökel, appeared in 2002.

== See also ==
- List of Bible translations by language § Alphabetically
