= Antonio del Corro =

- Born: 1527; Seville, Spain
- Died: 1591 (aged 63–64); London, United Kingdom
- Other names: Corrano, de Corran, Corranus

Antonio del Corro (Corrano, de Corran, Corranus; 1527 in Seville – 1591 in London) was a Spanish monk who became a Protestant convert. A noted Calvinist preacher and theologian, he taught at the University of Oxford and wrote the first Spanish grammar in English.

== Spain and exile on the Continent ==
He was a Hieronymite of the Abbey of San Isidro, Seville. Influenced by Cipriano de Valera, he came into contact with the Protestant ideas of Luther, Melanchthon and Bullinger.

=== Against Inquisition ===
He left Spain with others in 1557, fearing the Spanish Inquisition. Some scholars considered that he may be behind the pseudonym Reginaldus Gonsalvius Montanus (Renaldo Gonzalez Montano), who published in 1567 the account Sanctae Inquisitionis Hispanicae Artes aliquot detectae ac palam traductae, a major source for subsequent accounts of the Inquisition; however, others believe it belonged to Casiodoro de Reina.

== European travels ==
He travelled to Lausanne and Geneva but came to quarrel with Jean Calvin. On Calvin's recommendation, however, he became tutor to Henry of Navarre.

In France he used the name Bellerive, and served as a minister in Béarn. He was supported by both Jeanne d'Albret and Renée of France; the latter made him her chaplain at Montargis.

He became pastor of the Spanish church in Antwerp, but caused offence there too.

== In England ==
He came to England in the period 1567-70 and settled there. Having behind him the influence of William Cecil, he held positions as pastor of the Spanish church in London, 1568–70, and lecturer at the Temple Church, 1571–4. Later Robert Dudley, Earl of Leicester was an important patron. In England, del Corro moved away from Calvinism to more tolerant and even free-thinking positions to become a controversialist. It has been suggested that his qualified acceptance stemmed from political expediency.

At the Temple Church, he showed the influence of the Lutheran theologian Hemmingius in his preaching. He retreated from the Calvinist view of predestination. That shift brought him under criticism from Richard Alvey, Master of the Temple.

Controversy over his views followed him to Oxford, where he did tutoring and catechism work (at Hart Hall, also at Oriel College and St John's College) and became reader in theology in 1578. It brought him the opposition of the Puritan John Rainolds, who blocked his degree as Doctor of Divinity in 1576. He persisted in views favouring free will, such as in glossing the Epistle to the Romans, 5:22.

In Oxford, his pupils included John Donne and Thomas Belson, a Catholic martyr.

The Spanish Grammar (1590) was an English translation by John Thorie of a grammar written by del Corro to teach Spanish to French speakers, and published in Oxford in 1586.

In his recent work "Silence: A Christian History", Diarmaid MacCulloch has drawn attention (pp 170,287) to "The Life and Works of Antonion del Corro, 1527-91", an unpublished PhD thesis by W.McFadden and to a published work, much indebted to McFadden but with additional material, "Protestant Reformers in Elizabethan Oxford", Oxford 1983, pp 119–122. MacCulloch notes that del Corro made "cautious and unmistakable statements of Unitarianism" but still ended his days "in comfort as a prebendary of St Paul's Cathedral in London".

== Notes ==
Bromber, Robert, Antonio del Corro: Spanish Mirror for Gloriana (1997) unpublished thesis, Arizona State University

== See also ==
- Reginaldus Gonsalvius Montanus
- Casiodoro de Reina
- Reina-Valera
- Inquisition
