= Dryander =

Dryander is a family name. It originates as a 16th-century Humanist name, literally meaning (in Ancient Greek) "oak-man". It was used by people whose original name was Eichmann ("oak-man"), Eichholz ("oak-wood"), de Enzinas ("of the holm-oaks") etc., notable people with the surname include:

- Athaulphus Dryander (1490–1563), adopted name of Adolf Eichholz, German humanist and jurist
- Johann Dryander (Eichmann) (1500–1560), German physician and scholar
- Franciscus Dryander (1518–1552), adopted name of Francisco de Enzinas, Spanish humanist
- Jacobus Dryander (c. 1520 – 1547), adopted name of Diego de Enzinas, Spanish scholar
- Jonas Carlsson Dryander (also "Johann Dryander"), Swedish botanist (1748–1810)
- Johann Friedrich Dryander (1756–1812), German painter

Dryander is also

- a literary character in the novel Dichter und ihre Gesellen from German author Joseph Freiherr von Eichendorff (1788–1857)
