= Usque =

Usque is a surname. Notable people with the surname include:

- Abraham Usque, Portuguese translator
- Samuel Usque (c. 1500–after 1555), Portuguese converso
