= Bible translations into Spanish =

Several Spanish translations of the Bible have been made, with the first one translated ca. 1280. The medieval translations are known as biblias romanceadas in Spanish scientific literature.

== Jewish translations ==
Medieval Spanish Jews had a tradition of oral translation of Biblical readings into Spanish, and several manuscript translations were made, either for Jewish use or for Christian patrons, for example the 1430 Alba Bible. However, restrictions were placed on the private ownership of Spanish translations of the Bible, partly as a measure against Protestantism and partly for fear that crypto-Jews would use them as a resource for learning Jewish practices.

Following the expulsion of Jews from Spain, the refugees took these versions with them. In 1553 a printed version, known as the Ferrara Bible, was made in Latin characters for Duke Ercole II d'Este of Ferrara. In Constantinople and Salonica Bibles were printed in Hebrew, flanked by translations into Ladino and Judaeo-Greek in Hebrew characters, for the use of the Sephardi Jews. Some later prints contained the Ladino text alone.

== Reina-Valera translation ==
The classic Spanish translation of the Bible is that of Casiodoro de Reina, in 1569; this was later revised by Cipriano de Valera. It was for the use of the incipient Protestant movement and is widely regarded as the Spanish equivalent of the King James Version.

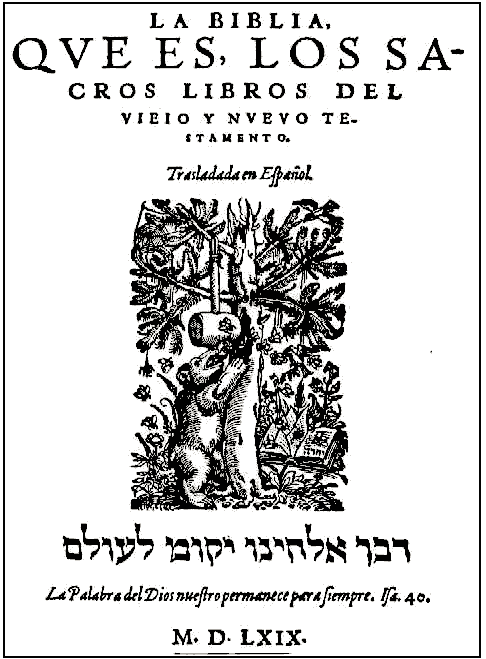
Bible's title-page traced to the Bavarian printer Mattias Apiarius, "the bee-keeper". Note the emblem of a bear tasting honey.

The first whole Bible in Spanish was printed in Basel in 1569, authored by Casiodoro de Reina, although some think that this Bible was a collective effort of some monks of the San Isidoro community in Spain, who, led by Casiodoro de Reyna, escaped Inquisition and persecution. This was the first version of the complete Bible in Spanish (including Apocrypha), and is known as "Biblia del Oso" because of the honey-eating bear on its title page. Reina presented the University of Basel with some volumes, one of them with Reina's dedicatory and signature.

For the Old Testament, the work was possibly based on the Ferrara Bible (printed 1553), with comparisons to the Masoretic Text and the Vetus Latina. The New Testament probably derives from the Textus Receptus of Erasmus with comparisons to the Vetus Latina and Syriac manuscripts. It is possible that Reina also used the New Testament versions that had been translated first by Francisco de Enzinas (printed in Antwerp 1543) and by Juan Pérez de Pineda (published in Geneva 1556, followed by the Psalms 1562). After the publication of the whole Bible by Reina, there was a version from Cipriano de Valera (printed in London 1596) which became part of the first Reina-Valera print (Amsterdam 1602).

This edition of the Reina–Valera Bible has been revised in the 17th, 19th, 20th, and 21st centuries (1602, 1862, 1865, 1909, 1960, 1977, 1989, 1990, 1995, 2000, 2004, 2007, 2009, 2010, 2011, 2012). The discussion on these revisions especially concerning the 1960 version resulted in the "Monterrey Revision Project", as well as others, aiming at a revision of the original version of 1602 according to the Textus Receptus.

The Reina–Valera Bible and most of its subsequent revisions, with the notable exceptions of the 2011 and 2015 revisions which uses "El Señor" (The Lord) and the 1990 revision which uses "El Eterno" (The Eternal), feature the divine name based on the Hebrew Tetragrammaton rendered as "Jehová" (Jehovah) throughout the Old Testament starting at Genesis 2:4. The Reina–Valera Bible is one of the Bible Versions authorized to be used in Spanish language services of the Episcopal Church and the Anglican Communion.

== Catholic translations ==
Catholic Bibles contain the entire canonical text identified by Pope Damasus I and the Synod of Rome (382) and the local Councils of Hippo (393) and Carthage (397), contained in Saint Jerome's Latin Vulgate translation (420), and decreed infallibly by the Ecumenical Council of Trent (1570). Their official publication requires approval by the Holy See or conference of bishops.

The Bible was first translated into Castilian Spanish in the so-called Pre-Alfonsine version, which led to the Alfonsine version for the court of Alfonso X (c. 1280); Spain was the first European country to have a complete Bible translation in its own language.

The complete Catholic Bible was printed in 1785, since the Inquisition had allowed Bible translations a few years earlier. A new version appeared in 1793. These were the first Spanish Bible translations officially made and approved by the Church in 300 years. The Torres Amat Bible appeared in 1823. Traditionalist Catholics consider this to be the best Spanish translation because it is a direct translation from St. Jerome's Latin Vulgate, like the English language Douay-Rheims Bible.

Of more recent versions, the first official translation of the complete Catholic Bible was done by Nácar-Colunga (1944), followed by Bover-Cantera (1947) and Straubinger (1944–51).

The most widely accepted Catholic Bible is the Jerusalem Bible, known as "la Biblia de Jerusalén" in Spanish, translated from Hebrew, Aramaic and Greek with exegetical notes translated from French into Spanish. It was first published in 1967, and revised in 1975, 1998 and 2009. It is also available in a modern Latin American version, and comes with full introductory texts and comments. This particular Catholic Bible version has the interesting distinction of rendering the divine name based on the Hebrew Tetragrammaton as "Yahvé" (Yahweh) as opposed to the most common rendering of "El Señor" (The Lord) throughout the Old Testament text starting at Genesis 2:4.

Other popular versions include Biblia Latinoamericana (1972), Nueva Biblia Española (1975), Cantera-Iglesia (1975), Sagrada Biblia (1978), Dios Habla Hoy (1979), La Biblia (1992), Biblia del Peregrino (1993), Biblia de América (1994) and La Biblia de Nuestro Pueblo (2006).

In recent years several ecumenical versions that carry the Deuterocanonical books, for example Dios Habla Hoy from the UBS, have been approved by the Episcopal Conference of Latin America (CELAM) for study purposes. Their acceptance, however, is limited and their use in liturgy avoided due to claims of inaccurate translations in key passages for Catholics like Luke 1:26-38, 40–45; John 20:22-23; 21:15-17.

In 2010 the Spanish Episcopal Conference (CEE) published an official version of the Holy Bible in Spanish for liturgical and catechetical use. Many of these Catholic translations are also the Bible Versions authorized to be used in Spanish language services of the Episcopal Church and the Anglican Communion.

== Messianic translations ==
Las Sagradas Escrituras, Versión Israelita Nazarena

Las Sagradas Escrituras, Versión Israelita Nazarena
- Other names: Versión Israelita Nazarena
- Abbreviation: VIN
- Complete Bible published: 2012
- Textual basis: OT: Masoretic Text . NT: Taken from the Novum Testamentum of Westcott and Hort into modern Spanish.
- Translation type: Dynamic equivalence
- Reading level: High School
- Copyright: El Candelero de Luz, Inc.
- Religious affiliation: Messianic Judaism
- Genesis 1:1–3 1 En el principio creó Elohim el cielo y la tierra. 2 La tierra estaba sin forma y vaciá; la oscuridad cubría la superficie del abismo y el aliento de Elohim se movía sobre la superficie del agua. 3 Elohim dijo: "Que haya luz"; y hubo luz. John 3:16 Porque de tal manera amó Elohim al mundo, que ha dado a su Hijo unigénito, para que todo el que crea en él no se pierda, sino que tenga vida eterna.

The Old and New Testaments have been translated into Spanish by Messianic translators, edited by Editorial Hebraica and published by El Candelero de Luz, Inc. with an introduction by J.A. Alvarez under the title Las Sagradas Escrituras, Versión Israelita Nazarena (The Sacred Scriptures, Israelite Nazarene Version) in Puerto Rico in 2012.

The Old Testament books follow the same order as the Jewish Bible and also includes Psalm 151. This translation is only available in Spanish. The Old Testament is based on the Hebrew Masoretic Text while the New Testament is based on the Novum Testamentum of Westcott and Hort (The New Testament in the Original Greek).

This translation uses the divine name of the Hebrew Tetragrammaton which renders it as Yahweh and/or Elohim throughout the text, while the Messiah's name is rendered Yahoshua as opposed to the more common and popular form of Yeshua or Jesus. The Holy Spirit is rendered "Espíritu de Yahweh" or "Santidad" (Spirit of Yahweh or Sanctity) as opposed to the more common Espíritu Santo (Holy Spirit).

This translation utilizes Hebrew names for people and places as opposed to the more common Greek/Spanish equivalents. Bible names are in italicized Hebrew (transliterated in the Roman alphabet) alongside their equivalent Spanish names.

This edition comes with an appendix and a Hebrew glossary to aid the reader in interpreting Hebrew names and words for people, places, objects and concepts such as the Hebrew word "mal’ākhīm" (מַלְאָכִים) which is rendered "mensajero" (messenger) as opposed to the more common Spanish word "ángel".

This Spanish language Messianic Bible was geared and oriented towards the growing Messianic Jewish movement in Latin America, Spain and Israel, where there is a Sephardic Jewish presence, as well as a growing number of Hispanic and Sephardic members in the Messianic Jewish movement in the United States of America and Canada.

Nuevo Testamento Judío

The "Nuevo Testamento Judío" is a 2011 re-translation into Spanish of Dr. David H. Stern's 1989 English translation known as the Jewish New Testament (B'rit Hadashah). Published by Messianic Jewish Resources International.

== List of Spanish translations ==
- Biblia Alfonsina, 1280.
- Fazienda de Ultramar, early 13th century. A travelogue of the Holy Land with translations of parts from the Hebrew Bible and the Latin Vulgate.
- Biblia del Duque de Alba, 1430.
- Antiguo Testamento del rabino Salomón, 1420.
- Antiguo Testamento de traductor anónimo, 1420.
- Nuevo Testamento de Francisco de Enzinas, 1543.
- Ferrara Bible, 1553.
- Nuevo Testamento de Juan Pérez de Pineda, 1556.
- Reina o "Biblia del Oso" (RV), 1569, revised in 1602 by Cipriano de Valera (see Reina-Valera).
- Biblia del padre Scío de San Miguel, 1793.
- Valera1865, Valera 1602 reprinted by the America Bible Society, revised by Dr. Ángel de Mora, 1865.
- Versión Moderna, 1893.
- Biblia de Petisco y Torres Amat (1º Tomo - Genesis to Ruth), 5º Tomo - Isaiah to Ezekiel, 1825.
- Nuevo Testamento versión hispanoamericana, 1916.
- Biblia Nácar-Colunga, 1944.
- Biblia Bóver-Cantera, 1947.
- Nuevo Testamento de monseñor Straubinger, 1948.
- Biblia Reina-Valera. Published in 1602 by Cipriano de Valera as a revision of the version by Casiodoro de Reina, revised numerous times since, notably by the United Bible Societies in 1960.
- Biblia de Jerusalén, 1966. Translation from French.
- Biblia de Editorial Labor, 1968.
- Biblia Latinoamericana, elsewhere called "Biblia edición pastoral para Latinoamérica", 1972.
- La Biblia de editorial Herder, 1975.
- Nueva Biblia Española, 1976.
- Sagrada Biblia de Magaña. 1978
- Biblia Interconfesional, 1978.
- Dios Habla Hoy o Versión Popular (DHH), 1979.
- La Biblia al Día, 1979.
- Biblia el libro del pueblo de Dios, 1980.
- Biblia de la Universidad de Navarra, 1983–2004.
- La Biblia de las Américas (LBLA), published by the Lockman Foundation, 1986, 1995, 1997.
- Biblia, versión revisada por un equipo de traductores dirigido por Evaristo Martín Nieto. 1989.
- Reina-Valera Actualizada (RVA), published by the Editorial Mundo Hispano, 1989.
- Biblia Casa de la Biblia, 1992.
- Biblia del Peregrino, 1993.
- Nuevo Testamento versión Recobro, 1994.
- Nueva Versión Internacional (NVI), 1999.
- Nuevo Testamento traducción de Pedro Ortiz, 2000.
- Nuevo Testamento la Palabra de Dios para Todos (PDT), 2000.
- VALERA1865, revised by Dr. Ángel de Mora, 1865, reprinted by the Valera Bible Society, 2000.
- Traducción en lenguaje actual (TLA), 2003.
- Reina Valera Gómez 2004 Publicada por Iglesia Bautista Libertad.
- Biblia la Palabra de Dios para Todos (PDT), 2005.
- Nueva Biblia de las Américas (NBLA), published by the Lockman Foundation, 2005. Formerly known as Nueva Biblia Latinoamericana de Hoy (NBLH), Nueva Biblia de los Hispanos (NBH), y Nueva Biblia Latinoamericana (NBL)
- Nueva Biblia al día (NBD), 2008 Published by Thomas Nelson.
- Nueva Traducción Viviente (NTV), 2010 Published by Tyndale Español.
- Santa Biblia: Reina-Valera 2009, 2009 Published by the Church of Jesus Christ of Latter-day Saints.
- Santa Biblia: Nueva Reina-Valera Versión Siglo XXI, 2009 Published by Sociedad Bíblica Emanuel.
- Sagrada Biblia. Versión oficial de la Conferencia Episcopal Española, 2010. (SagradaBibliaCEE.com. Printed editions include ISBN 978-8422015017 = paperback, and ISBN 978-8422015611 = reforzada.)
- Reina Valera Contemporánea, 2011 Published by Sociedades Biblicas Unidas (United Bible Societies).
- Nuevo Testamento Judío, 2011 by Dr. David H. Stern published by Messianic Jewish Resources International.
- Las Sagradas Escrituras, Versión Israelita Nazarena, 2012 Published by El Candelero de Luz, Inc. in Puerto Rico.
- La Santa Biblia Rey Jacobo, 2017 Available at Www.reyjacobo.com
