= Elter =

Elter is a surname. Notable people with the surname include:

- Anielka Elter (1901–1958), Czechoslovak actress
- Anton Elter (1858–1925), German philologist
- Leo Elter (1929–2008), American football running back
- Margaret Elter (c. 1525 –c. 1553), German protestant
- Peter Elter (born 1958), German tennis player
- Robert Elter (1899–1991), Luxembourgish footballer

== See also ==
- Elter Water, is a small lake in North West England
