= List of Bienes de Interés Cultural in the Province of Seville =

This is a list of Bien de Interés Cultural landmarks in the Province of Seville, Spain.

- Ex-Monastery of San Isidoro del Campo
- Chapel of Antiguo Seminario Santa María de Jesús
- Gate of Sevilla (Carmona)
- Walls of Seville
- Church of Santa Catalina (Sevilla)
- Chapel of San José (Sevilla)
- Collegiate Church of Osuna
- Monastery of San Clemente (Sevilla)
