= João Ferreira de Almeida =

Portuguese Protestant pastor and Bible translator (1628–1691)

João Ferreira Annes de Almeida
- Born: 1628; Várzea de Tavares, Kingdom of Portugal
- Died: 1691 (aged 63); Batavia, Java
- Occupation: Dutch Reformed pastor
- Known for: Bible translation into Portuguese

João Ferreira Annes d'Almeida (1628–1691) was a Portuguese Protestant pastor and translator, best known for his translation of the Bible into Portuguese now known by his name.

== Biography ==
Ferreira de Almeida was born in 1628 in Várzea de Tavares, Kingdom of Portugal. He began his translation of the Bible into Portuguese at the age of 16 (after converting to Protestantism at 14), and continued translating until his death. He translated the New Testament completely and most books of the Old Testament (Hebrew Bible). The Portuguese translation was completed by his friend, Jacobus op den Akker. Almeida also wrote several other works, most of them polemical treatises against Roman Catholicism.

He was a Protestant pastor educated in the Dutch Reformed tradition, worked with Reformed churches in Java (at the time a Dutch colony; modern-day Indonesia), and also preached in Goa on the Indian subcontinent (at the time a Portuguese colony, now part of India). Ferreira de Almeida died in Batavia, Java. Little is known about his life; the majority of facts come from the preface of his Portuguese translation of a Spanish booklet entitled "Differença d'a Christandade".

== Bible translation ==
Ferreira de Almeida's translation of the Bible into Portuguese is most closely associated with Portuguese-speaking Protestant Christians and is the most commonly used translation by Portuguese-speaking Evangelicals, particularly in Brazil. He based his translation on a Latin bible version by Theodore Beza, and some other translations in other languages. His work is the source of many Bible versions, like the Edição Revista e Corrigida (Revised and Corrected Edition, published in 1948, is an update of other editions), the Edição Revista e Atualizada (Revised and Updated Edition, most based in newer manuscripts), published by Brazilian Bible Society and Portuguese Bible Society, Almeida Corrigida e Fiel (Almeida Corrected and Faithful), by Trinitarian Bible Society of Brazil, and Edição Contemporânea de Almeida (Almeida's Contemporary Edition), by Editora Vida. In 2015, The Church of Jesus Christ of Latter-day Saints published its own edition of the Bible in Portuguese based on Ferreira de Almeida's translation.

The main principle of translation used by Ferreira de Almeida was that of formal equivalence (following the syntax of the original text in the target language), and he utilized the Textus Receptus as a textual basis. His Portuguese style is described as "classical and erudite"; the Brazilian Bible Society states that Ferreira de Almedia sought to reflect both the form, style, and language register of the original texts in his translation.

=== Editions ===
- First edition of the New Testament, in 1681.
- Second edition of the New Testament, in 1693.
- Third edition of the New Testament, in 1711.
- A Biblia Sagrada. contendo o Velho e o Novo Testamento (The Holy Bible with the Old and New Testament) - 1821, 1848, 1850
- 1911
- Ferreira de Almeida Atualizada (1948)
