= Church of Santa Catalina (Sevilla) =

- Iglesia de Santa Catalina (Spanish)
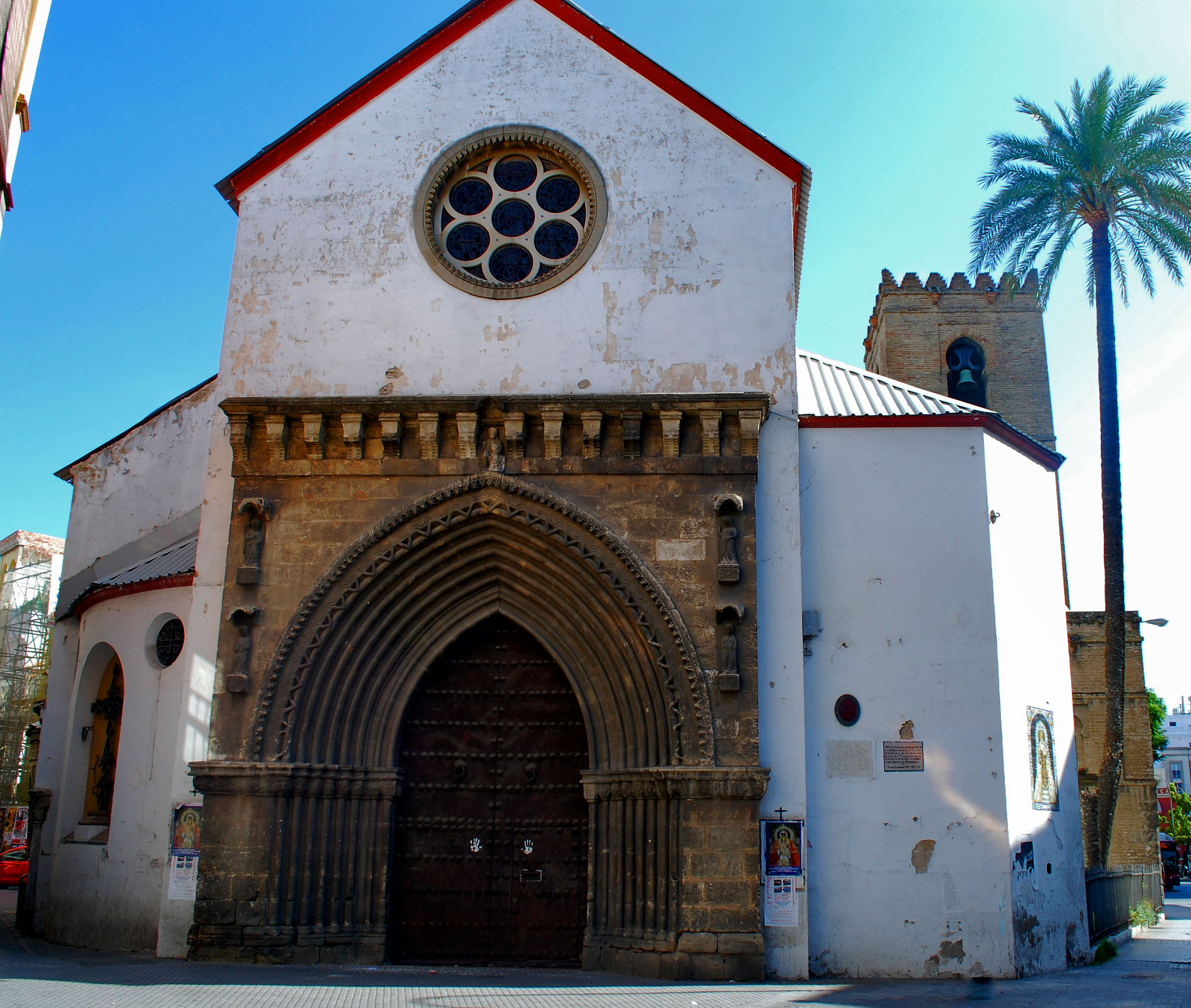

- Location within Spain
- 37.393081°N 5.988206°W
- Location: Sevilla, Spain

Spanish Cultural Heritage
- Official name: Iglesia de Santa Catalina
- Type: Non-movable
- Criteria: Monument
- Designated: 1912
- Reference no.: RI-51-0000104

The Church of Santa Catalina (Spanish: Iglesia de Santa Catalina) is a church located in Sevilla, Spain, constructed in the fourteenth century. It was declared Bien de Interés Cultural in 1912.

== History ==
The original church was constructed sometime in the thirteenth or fourteenth century, but following an earthquake in 1356, the current church was rebuilt and has been enlarged over time. During the archeological excavation of the area, it was confirmed that the church was built on the site of a former mosque, and the theory that the tower was a reused minaret was ruled out. The church exhibits characteristics of both gothic and mudéjar architecture, although it has been renovated several times over the years.

The restoration works directed by the municipal architect Juan Talavera y Heredia between 1923 and 1930 culminated with the installation of a gothic facade from the fourteenth century Iglesia de Santa Lucía which now covers the original mudéjar door of the Church of Santa Catalina.

== See also ==
- List of Bien de Interés Cultural in the Province of Seville
