= Moshe Lazar =

Professor of comparative literature

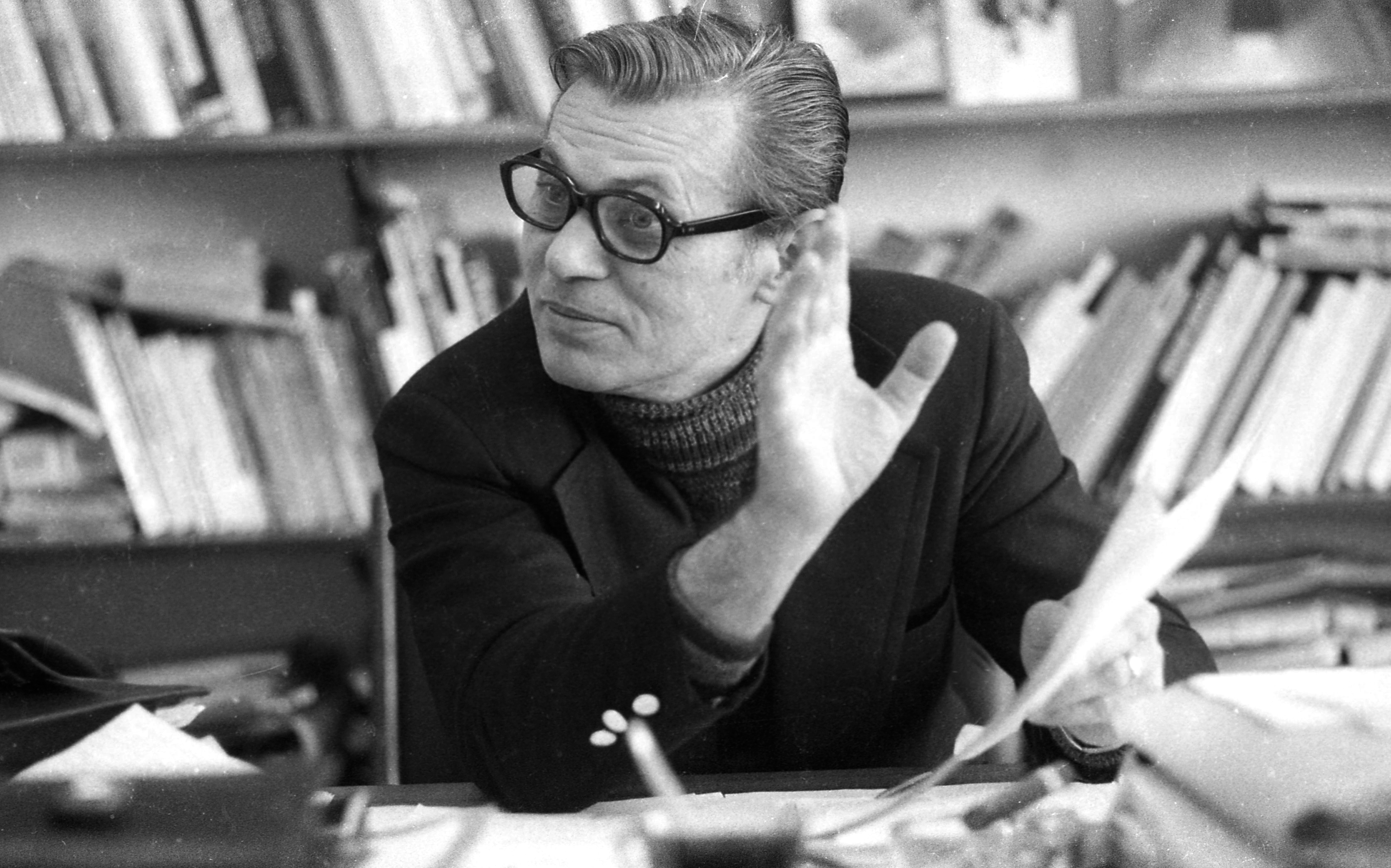
Moshe Lazar in his office in 1977

Moshe Lazar (Hebrew: משה לזר; July 4, 1928, Bretea Română – December 13, 2012, Culver City, California, USA), was a professor of comparative literature and drama at the University of Southern California (and the founder of the school's comparative literature department). Prior to his arrival at USC in 1977, he served as the Dean of the School of Visual and Performing Arts (of which he was also the founder) at the University of Tel Aviv. Lazar wrote more than 40 books over the course of his academic career and also translated numerous French, Spanish, and Italian plays into Hebrew for performance on the Israeli stage.

Lazar received his M.A. in 1951 from Hebrew University and his Ph.D. from the Sorbonne in 1957. He also received an honorary doctorate from the University of Judaism (now the American Jewish University) in 1990 and an Orden del Mérito Civil from the consul general of Spain in 1993, and was awarded the Raubenheimer Outstanding Senior Faculty Award by USC in 2003.

== See also ==
- Fazienda de Ultramar, a medieval Old Spanish travelogue for the Holy Land published by Lazar.
