= Chapel of San José (Sevilla) =

- Capilla de San José (Spanish)
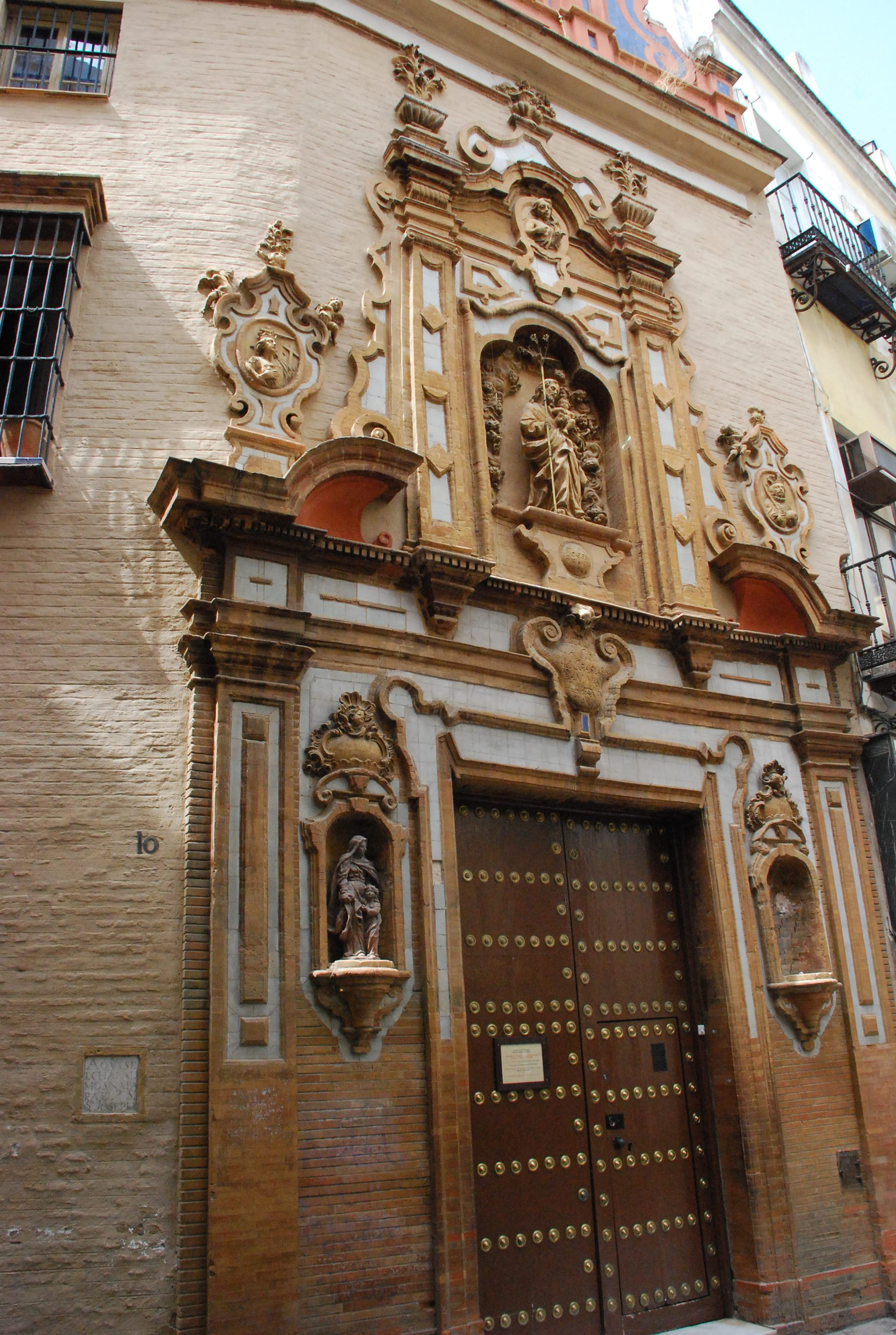

- Location within Spain
- 37.389975°N 5.994824°W
- Location: Sevilla, Spain

Spanish Cultural Heritage
- Official name: Capilla de San José
- Type: Non-movable
- Criteria: Monument
- Designated: 1912
- Reference no.: RI-51-0000105

The Chapel of San José (Spanish: Capilla de San José) is a chapel located in Sevilla, Spain. It was declared Bien de Interés Cultural in 1912.

== See also ==
- List of Bien de Interés Cultural in the Province of Seville
