= Alberto Colunga Cueto =

Alberto Colunga Cueto O.P. (Noreña, 27 November 1879 - Caleruega, 22 April 1962) was a Spanish Dominican priest and translator. Together with Eloíno Nácar Fúster he produced a renowned translation of the Bible known as Nácar-Colunga.
