= San Leonardo de Alba de Tormes =

Monastery near Alba de Tormes, Spain

San Leonardo de Alba de Tormes was a monastery near Alba de Tormes in Spain. It was suppressed in the 19th century.

The date of San Leonardo's foundation is uncertain. It may be referred to in the fuero given to Alba de Tormes in 1140, although the latter only mentions a garden named San Leonardo. The monastery was founded as a mixed Praemonstratensian community of monks and nuns, most likely in 1154 by the Emperor Alfonso VII. Alfonso granted the lordship of Alba de Tormes to Sancho, the abbot of Retuerta, the father house of San Leonardo. In 1164 the nuns were removed and the foundation became male-only. In 1168 some monks from San Leonardo left to found the monastery of La Caridad in Ciudad Rodrigo. The house of San Miguel de Groz in Portugal was also a product of San Leonardo until it was absorbed back into it as a dependency in the fourteenth or fifteenth century. The convent of Santa Sofía de Toro was probably a daughter house, since its necrology lists many of the abbots of San Leonardo. One abbot, Fernando, attended the Council of Basel in 1434 as part of the Spanish Praemonstratensian delegation.

In 1439, on account of the relaxed discipline prevailing there, San Leonardo was turned over to the Hieronymites by the archbishop Gutierre Álvarez de Toledo, who was also lord of Alba. Sources disagree whether he was acting on orders from Pope Eugene IV, or on his own initiative. The historian of the Hieronymites, José de Sigüenza, cited a papal bull of 2 February 1442 authorising a new foundation with Hieronymites from the monastery of Montamarta. In 1446 the transfer was confirmed by a bull of Nicholas IV, now in the national archives. The ceremony was performed by the archdeacon of Medina on 7 November 1447 in the presence of Fernando Álvarez de Toledo, the first count of Alba. Numerous members of the House of Alba were eventually buried in San Leonardo.

== Sources ==
- Pinilla González, Jaime (1978). El arte de los Monasterios y Conventos despoblados de la provincia de Salamanca. Salamanca: Ediciones Universidad de Salamanca.
