= Alba de Tormes =

- Municipality
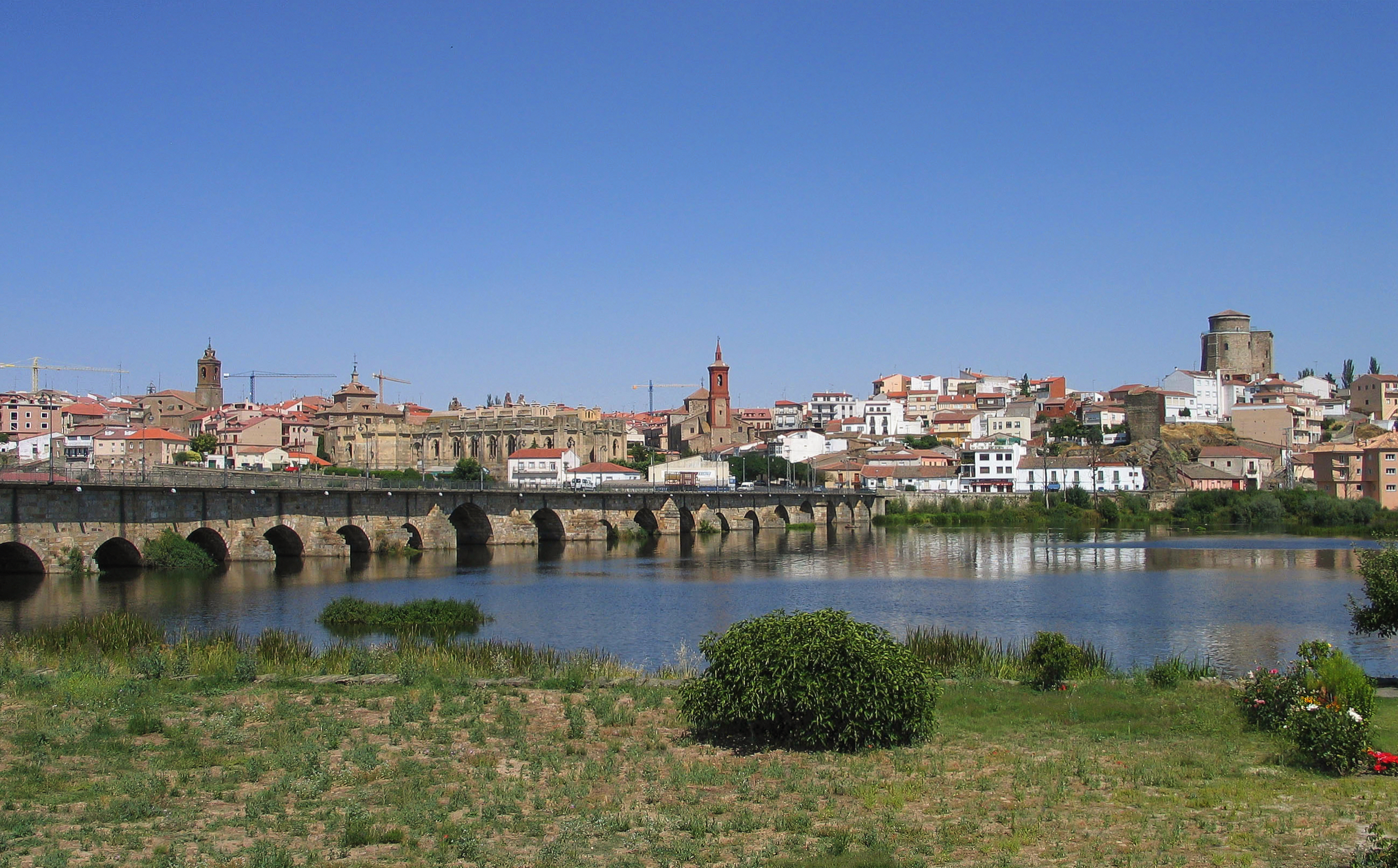
- Panoramica of Alba de Tormes and the bridge over the river Tormes

- Coat of arms

- Location in Salamanca
- Coordinates: 40°50′N 5°30′W
- Country: Spain
- Autonomous community: Castile and León
- Province: Salamanca
- Comarca: Tierra de Alba

Area
  - Total: 46.51 km^{2} (17.96 sq mi)
- Elevation: 836 m (2,743 ft)

Population (2025-01-01)
  - Total: 5,099
  - Density: 109.6/km^{2} (283.9/sq mi)
- Time zone: UTC+1 (CET)
  - Summer (DST): UTC+2 (CEST)
- Website: www.albadetormes.com

Alba de Tormes is a municipality in the province of Salamanca, western Spain, part of the autonomous community of Castile and León. The town is on the River Tormes upstream from the city of Salamanca. Alba gave its name to one of Spain's most important dukedoms, who had their ancestral seat in the Castillo de los Duques de Alba. St Teresa of Ávila died at a convent she founded in the town and is buried there.

From the 12th to the 19th century, the monastery of San Leonardo was located outside the walls of Alba.

During medieval times, a Jewish community thrived in Alba de Tormes, with the first record of Jewish presence dating to 1140 AD. The community thrived until the 1492 expulsion of the Jews.

== Notable people ==
- Fernando Álvarez de Toledo, 3rd Duke of Alba
- St Teresa of Ávila died at Alba
- St John of the Cross
- Eloíno Nácar Fúster, priest and Bible translator

== Pictures ==
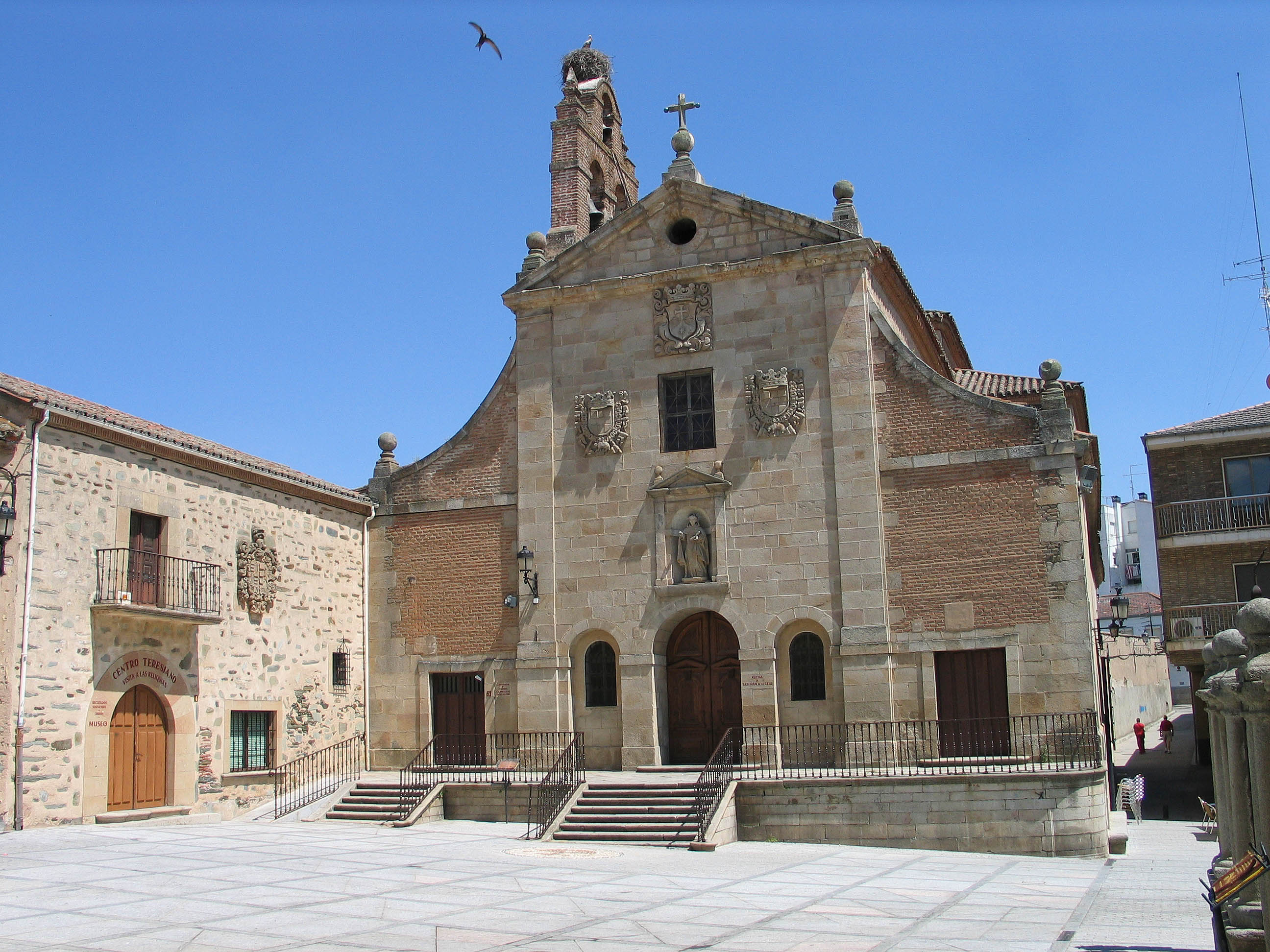
Church of St John of the Cross

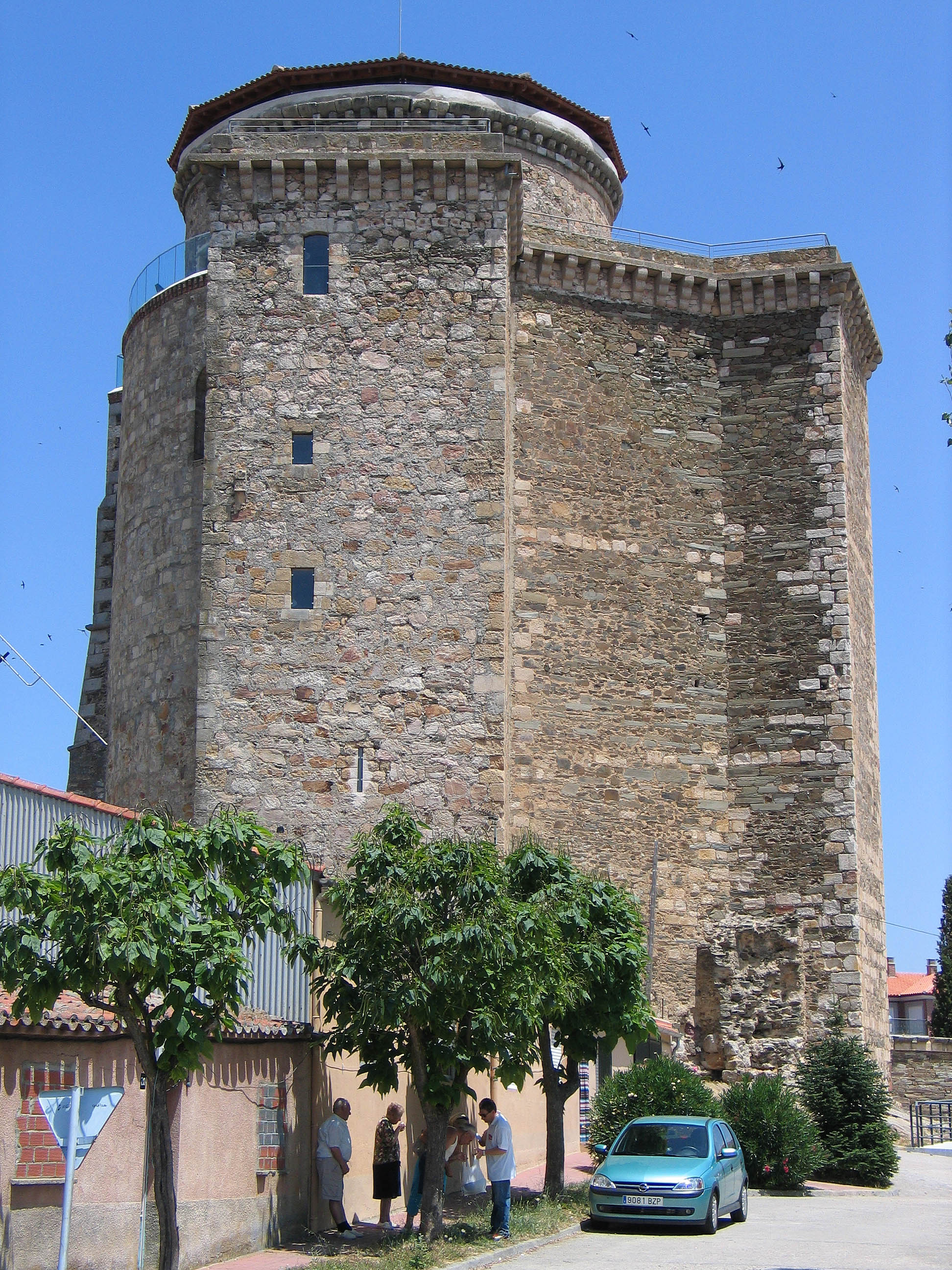
Castle of the Dukes of Alba's Keep, founded in 1430

== See also ==
- Battle of Alba de Tormes
