= Castillo de los Duques de Alba =

Castle-palace in Alba de Tormes, Spain

Coordinates: 40.824279°N 5.513681°W

Castillo de los Duques de Alba is a castle-palace in Alba de Tormes, Salamanca province, western Spain. It is the ancestral seat of the House of Alba. Today, the castle is in ruins and can be visited by the public.

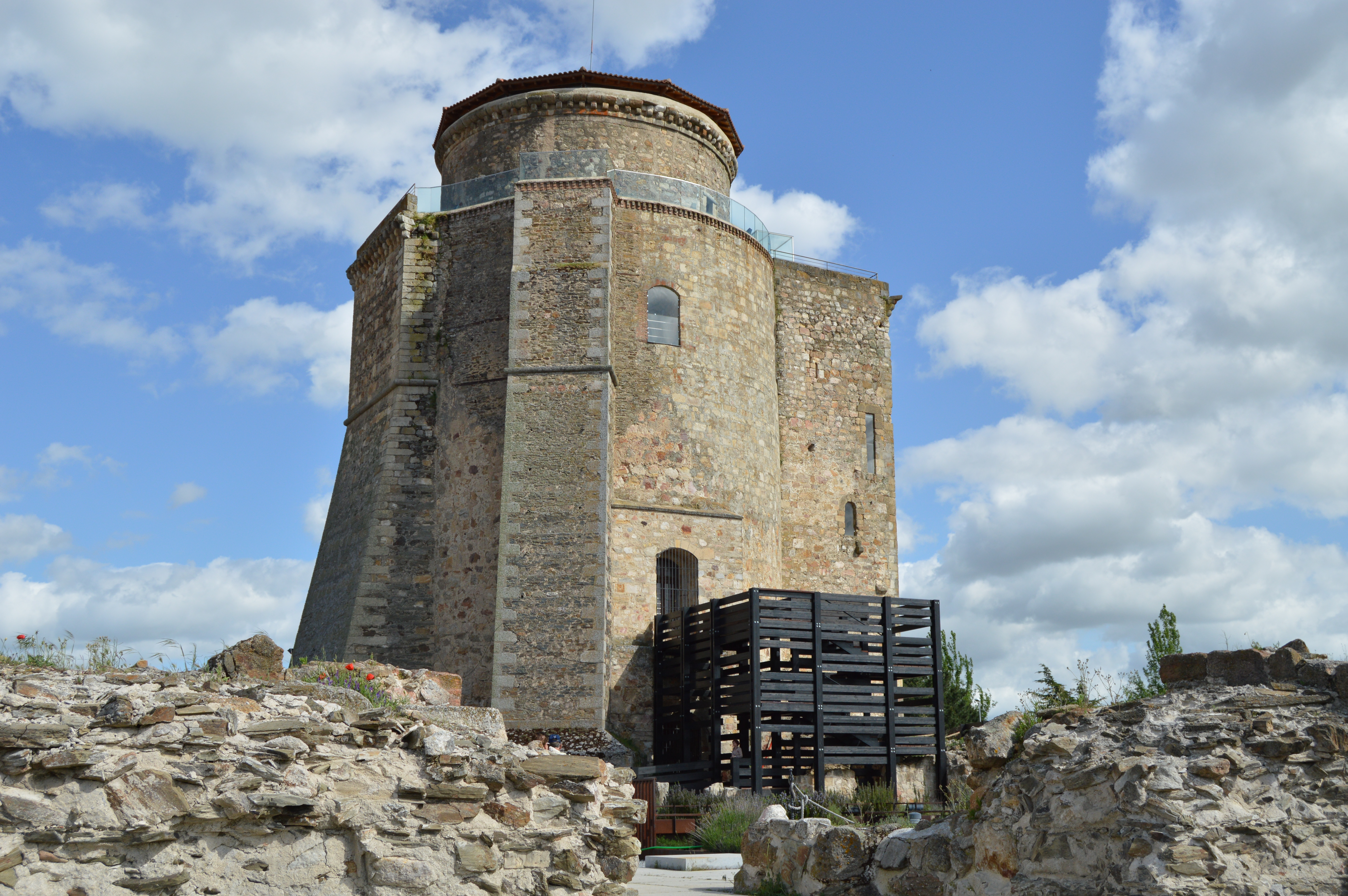
The keep of the Castillo de los Duques de Alba

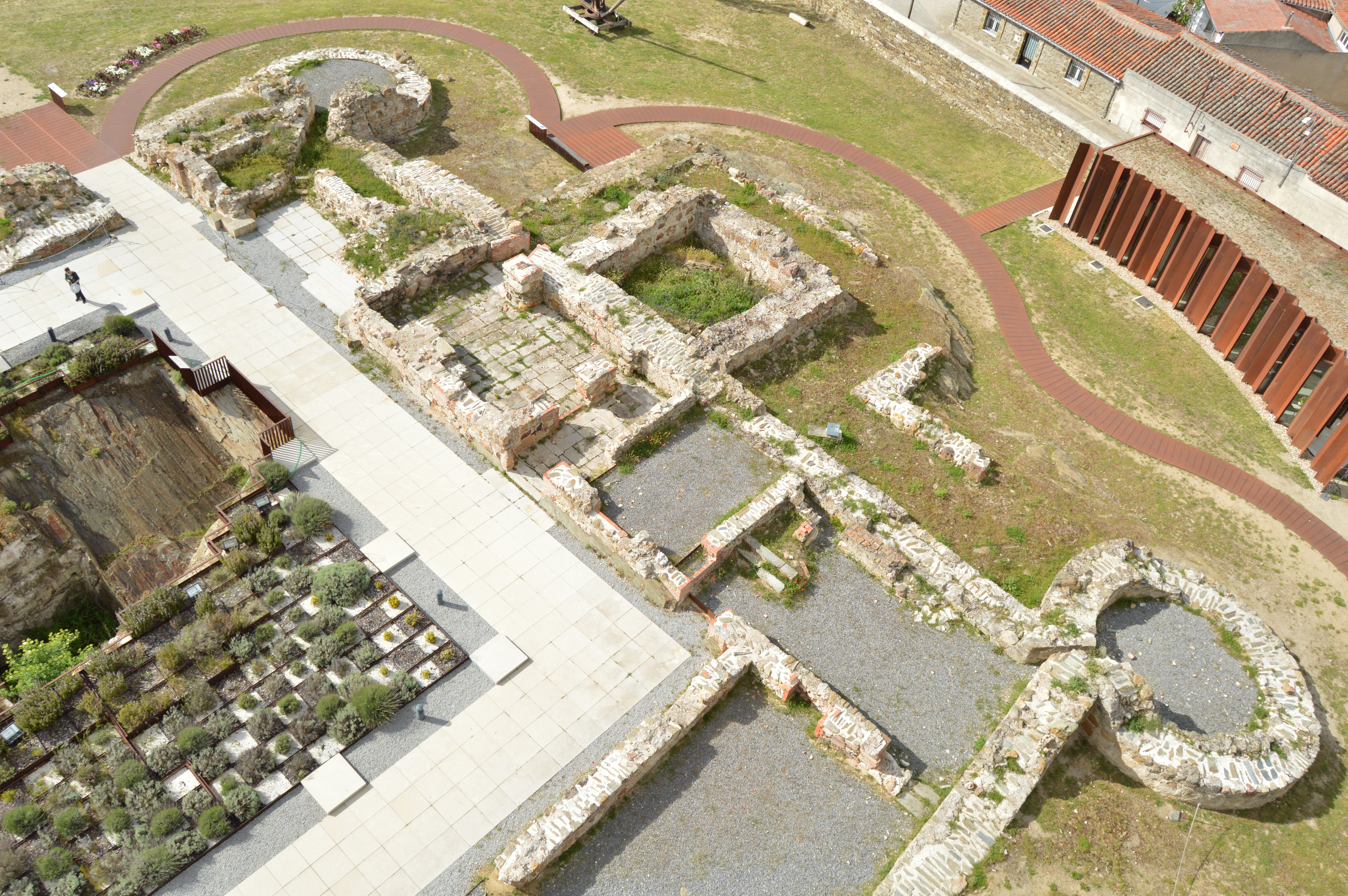
View from the keep on the archaeological excavations

== History ==
The castle dates back to the 12th century when king Ferdinand II of León built a watchtower on a site overlooking the river Tormes. King Sancho IV of Castile converted the tower into a castle, which was destroyed during the reign of king Henry IV of Castile. The House of Alba took possession of the site and García Álvarez de Toledo, 1st Duke of Alba rebuilt the castle as a fortress and private residence. Fernando Álvarez de Toledo, 3rd Duke of Alba turned the castle into a true renaissance palace, where the sober exterior contrasted with the rich interior containing beautiful frescos depicting the Battle of Mühlberg, where the duke distinguished himself. During the Napoleonic Wars the castle was destroyed; only one tower, which is still owned by the Alba family, remained.

Archaeological excavations were made to uncover the former splendour of the castle-palace in 1991

== Bibliography ==
- Carlos Sarrthou Carreres (1991), Castillos de Espana. Espasa-Calpe, Madrid
- Manuel Retuerce (1992), “El castillo de Alba de Tormes: primeros resultados arqueológicos” in the Boletín de Amigos del Museo de Salamanca, 2, p. 19-22. (http://www.nrtarqueologos.com/wp-content/uploads/Retuerce-Castillo-Alba-Tormes.pdf)
