= Gate of Sevilla (Carmona) =

Historic gate in Carmona, Spain

Gate of Seville
- Puerta de Sevilla (Spanish)
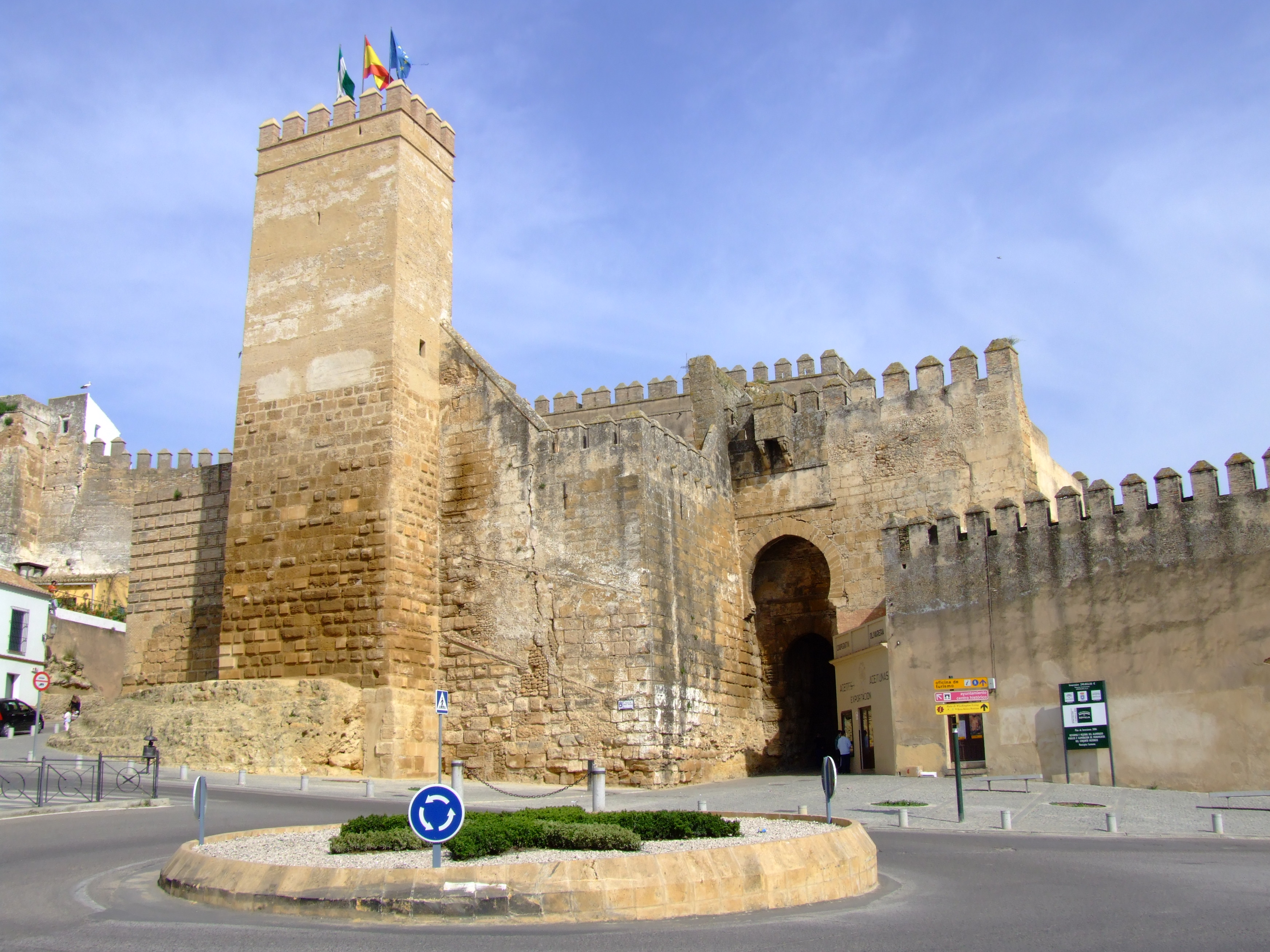

- Location within Spain
- 37.471207°N 5.64139°W
- Location: Carmona, Province of Seville, Spain

History
- Built: 8th century BC (original tower); reinforced by Carthaginians c. 3rd century BC

Spanish Cultural Heritage
- Official name: Puerta de Sevilla (Carmona)
- Type: Non-movable
- Criteria: Monument
- Designated: 1906
- Reference no.: RI-51-0000090

The Gate of Seville (Spanish: Puerta de Sevilla) is a fortified gate on the western approach to Carmona in the Province of Seville, Spain. The structure originated as a tower in the 8th century BC and was expanded into a bastion by the Carthaginians to repel Roman attacks, giving it the quadrangular form still visible today. Under the Roman emperor Augustus, the Carthaginian fortification was reinforced and a temple was built on top of the bastion, the base of which is partly preserved. Julius Caesar, who was familiar with the town's defences, described Carmona as "the strongest city of Baetica during ancient times".

During the Islamic period, a horseshoe arch from the Caliphate period (10th century) and an external pointed horseshoe arch from the Almohad period (12th century) were added. Further alterations were made during the reign of Peter I in the 14th century. The gate was declared a Bien de Interés Cultural in 1906.

In the 1970s, houses adjoining the fortress were demolished, and in 1973 restoration work opened the Presos Bajo and Alto rooms, the Aljibes courtyard, and the Golden Tower to the public.

== See also ==
- List of Bien de Interés Cultural in the Province of Seville
