= Fazienda de Ultramar =

13th-century Old Spanish pilgrim guide to the Holy Land and Bible translation

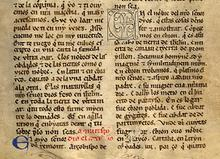
A page of the manuscript of Fazienda de Ultramar, stored in the University of Salamanca.

The Fazienda de Ultramar ("The Deed of Outremer") is an Old Spanish book from the early 13th century, that is composed of a geographical and historical journey in the form of a guide for pilgrims to the Holy Land. It has similarities to travel guides and Biblical texts in Romance languages.

== Contents ==
For the most part, the book is a geographical itinerarium, similar in style to a pilgrims' guide to Jerusalem and Bethlehem. It is not based on a real journey, but on previous journeys. Included in the book is also one of the earliest translations of the Bible in an Iberian Romance language along with some New Testament stories, fragments of hagiography, legends and some classical-era material. The biblical translations are based on the Hebrew Bible and the Latin Vulgate.

== Structure, authorship and dating ==
The book opens with two letters: In one, a certain don Remont, archbishop of Toledo, writes to a friend, Almeric, to ask him to write back with information about the Holy Land. The exchange is regarded as genuine and it was surmised that it took place during Raymond de Sauvetât's archbishopric (1124-1152). However, Almeric was French and as such the letters would have been written in Latin or, less likely, in French.

== Manuscripts ==
There is one surviving manuscript, which is housed in the library of the University of Salamanca. In 1965, it was edited by Moshé Lazar, attributing it to the archdean of Antakya, Almeric and dating it at between 1126 and 1142.
