= Eloíno Nácar Fúster =

Spanish priest and translator

Eloíno Nácar Fúster (Alba de Tormes, 1870-1948) was a Spanish priest and translator. Together with Alberto Colunga Cueto he performed a renowned translation of the Bible known as Nácar-Colunga.
