= Nácar-Colunga =

1944 Spanish translation of the Bible

The Nácar-Colunga is a Spanish translation of the Bible originally published in 1944 as the first volume of the recently formed Catholic editorial Biblioteca de Autores Cristianos (Library of Christian Authors). This work was performed by Eloíno Nácar Fúster and Alberto Colunga Cueto. It is the first Catholic Bible in Spanish translated from the original languages (all other Catholic translations of the Bible had been translated from the Latin Vulgate up to that point). It has undergone several editions, with the most recent being from 2024.

Starting in 1961, the professors from the Pontifical University of Salamanca began editing a special edition of the Nácar-Colunga Bible, updating the text and adding substantial commentaries. This edition would be known as the Biblia comentada (Commentated Bible). It was the text from this edition that would serve as the base for the 1966 revision of the Nácar-Colunga done by the Dominican priest Maximiliano García Cordero and which all subsequent editions of the Nácar-Colunga would be based on.

It constitutes one of the most popular Spanish versions in the Roman Catholic Church due to its elegant and poetic style that many find beautiful. Because of this, and because it's the first Spanish Catholic Bible translated from the original languages, it has come to be known as the "Spanish Vulgate" (Spanish: Vulgata española).

== See also ==
- Bible translations
- Bible translations into Spanish
