= Casiodoro de Reina =

Spanish theologian

The Reverend Casiodoro de Reina
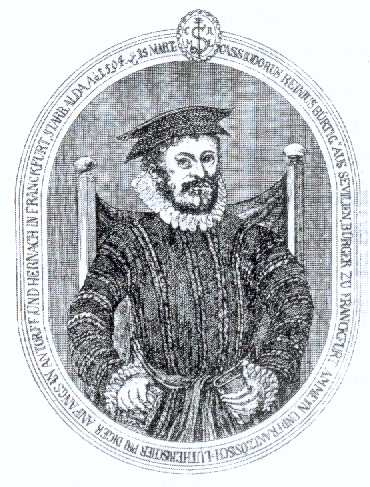
- Born: 1520; Montemolín, Badajoz, Extremadura, Spain
- Died: March 15, 1594 (aged 73–74) (Germany) Frankfurt am Main, Hesse, Holy Roman Empire
- Occupation: Theologian
- Notable work: Biblia del Oso

Casiodoro de Reina or de Reyna (c. 1520 – 15 March 1594) was a Spanish Protestant theologian and former Catholic monk who (perhaps with several others) translated the Bible into Spanish.

== Biography ==
Reina was born about 1520 in Montemolín, Spain, in the Province of Badajoz. From his youth onward, he studied the Bible. He was ordained as a priest in the mid-to-late 1540s as a monk of the Hieronymites at the Monastery of St. Isidore of the Fields outside of Seville.

Around 1557, he had contact with Lutheranism and he became an adherent of the Protestant Reformation. He fled with about a dozen other monks when they came under suspicion by the Spanish Inquisition for Protestant tendencies to Geneva But he was not comfortable with the atmosphere and the doctrinaire rigidity around John Calvin. In 1558, Reina declared that Geneva had become "a new Rome" and left. Reina travelled in 1559 to London, where he served as a pastor to Spanish Protestant refugees. However King Philip II of Spain was exerting pressure for his extradition.

=== In exile ===
In the late 1550s he was suspected by the Spanish inquisitors in Seville to have been the one who converted the monks of San Isidro to Lutheranism. in April 1562, the Inquisition made an auto-da-fé in which an effigy of him was burned. The works of Reina and his colleagues were placed in the Index of prohibited books and he was declared a "heresiarch" (leader of heretics).

About 1563 Reina went on to Antwerp, where he became associated with the authors of the Polyglot Bible. In April 1564 he went to Frankfurt, where he settled with his family.

Reina wrote the first great book against the Inquisition: Sanctae Inquisitionis hispanicae artes aliquot detectae, ac palam traductae ("Some arts of Holy Inquisition"). This work was printed in 1567 in Heidelberg under the pseudonym: Reginaldus Gonsalvius Montanus.

He secretly translated the work of the critic of Calvin, Sebastian Castellion, De haereticis, an sint persequendi ("Concerning heretics, whether they should be Persecuted"), that condemned executions "for reasons of conscience" and documented the original Christian rejection of the practice.

=== Bible translation ===
While in exile, variously in London, Antwerp, Frankfurt, Orléans and Bergerac, funded by various sources (such as Juan Pérez de Pineda) Reina began translating the Bible into Spanish by using a number of works as source texts. For the Old Testament, the work appears to have made extensive use of the Ferrara Bible in Ladino, with comparisons to the Masoretic Text and the Vetus Latina. The New Testament derives from the Textus Receptus of Erasmus, with comparisons to the Vetus Latina and Syriac manuscripts. For the New Testament, he had great aid from the translations of Francisco de Enzinas and Juan Pérez de Pineda.

Reina was granted citizenship by Frankfurt on 16 August 1571. He worked as a silk trader to make money for his family. In 1574, he bought the library of Johannes Oporinus at an auction in Basel who had died in July 1568. With Oporinus he unsuccessfully attempted to publish the first Bible in the Spanish language before he died for which he advanced 400 guilders. It is speculated that Reina's Bible, published in Switzerland in 1569, which became the basis of the Reina-Valera Bible, was a composite work of the expatriate Isidorean community, done by several different hands, with Reina the first among them.

Step by step, he became a true member of the Lutherans. Around 1580, he published a Catechism, in the sense of Luther's Catechism, in Latin, French and Dutch.

=== Death ===
Reina died in 1594 in Frankfurt.

== Works ==
Beside his Spanish Bible translation he published other works:

- Confessión de Fe cristiana (hecha por ciertos fieles españoles, los cuales, huyendo los abusos de la Iglesia Romana y la crueldad de la Inquisición de España, dexaron su patria, para ser recibidos de la Iglesia de los fieles, por hermanos en Christ). London, ca. 1560 - Reprint: Confessión de fe Christiana. The Spanish Protestant Confession of Faith. Exeter, 1988, edited by A. Gordon Kinder
- Sanctae Inquisitionis hispanicae artes aliquot detectae, ac palam traductae. Heidelberg, 1567, under the pseudonym: Reginaldus Gonsalvius Montanus; the Spanish title: Algunas artes de la Santa Inquisición española; (in English: Some arts of Holy Inquisition)
- La Biblia que es los Sacros libros del Vieio y Nuevo Testamento ... Transladada en Espanol. Basel, 1569
- Evangelium Ioannis. Frankfurt am Main, 1573; published in Latin; in the Spanish title: Comentarios a los Evangelios de Juan y Mateo
- Expositio primae partis capitis quarti Matthaei. Frankfurt am Main, 1573; Dutch translation by Florentius de Bruin, Dordrecht, 1690; published in Latin; in the Spanish title: Comentarios a los Evangelios de Juan y Mateo
- Sixtus Senensis, ed.: Bibliotheca sancta à F. Sixto Senensi ex praecipuis catholicae ecclesiae authoribus collecta. Frankfurt am Main, 1575
- Confessio in articulo de coena. Antwerpen, 1579
- Catechismus, Hoc est: Brevis instructio de praecipuis capitibus christianae doctrinae, per quaestiones & responsiones, pro Ecclesia Antwerpiensi quae Confessionem Augustanam profitetur. Antwerpen, ca. 1580; published in Latin, French and Dutch; the Spanish title: Catecismo
- Estatutos para la sociedad de ayuda a los pobres y perseguidos, in Frankfurt.
- Exposión de la primera parte del capitulo cuarto de San Mateo sobre las tentaciones de Cristo, edited by Carlos López Lozano. Madrid, 1988
