= Ferrara Bible =

1553 Ladino translation of the Hebrew Bible

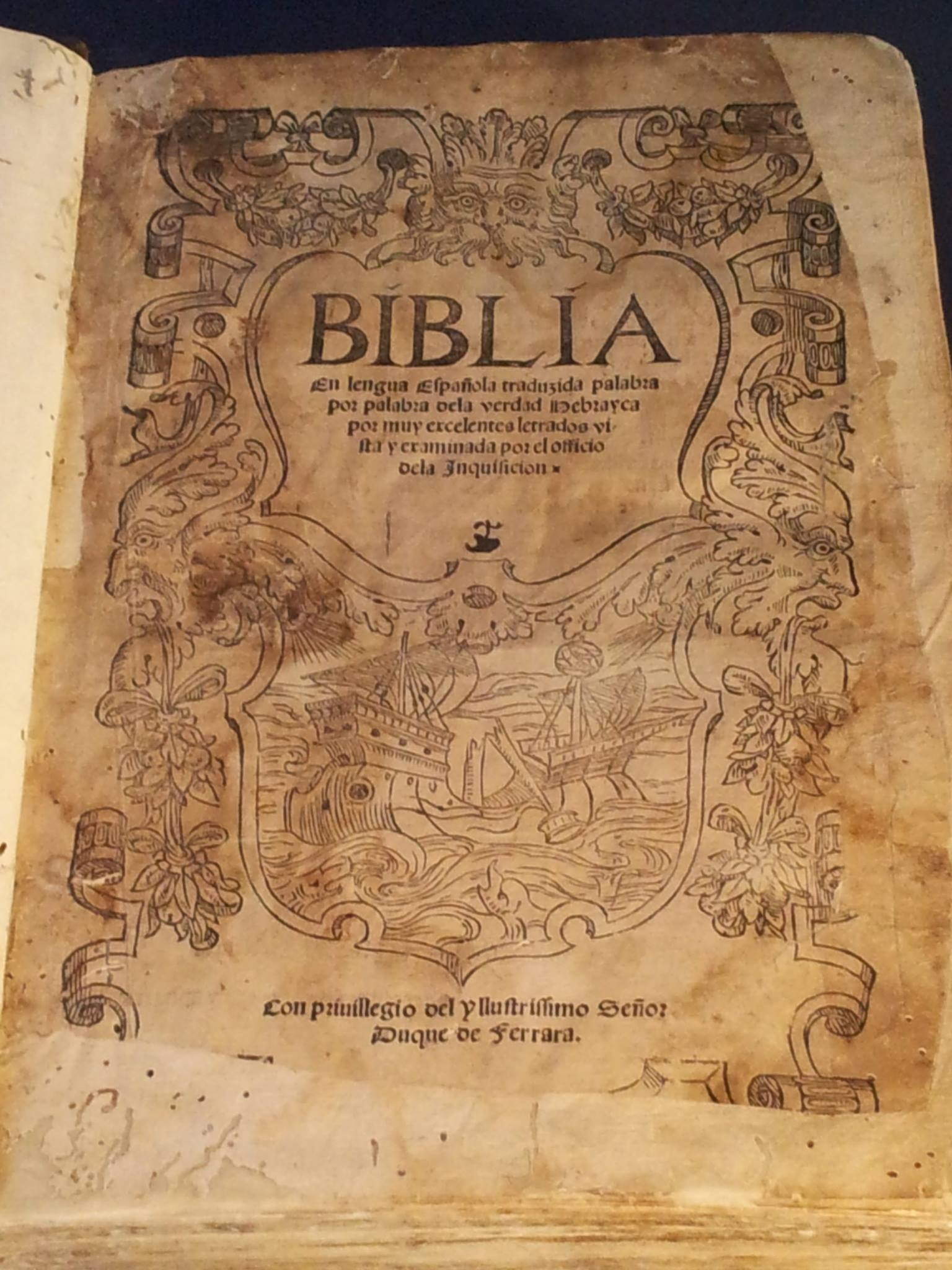
- Original title: Biblia en Lengua Española Traduzida Palabra por Palabra dela Verdad Hebrayca por Muy Excelentes Letrados, Vista y Examinada por el Oficio de la Inquisicion
- Translator: Abraham Usque and Yom-Tob Athias
- Language: Ladino
- Genre: Religion, Judaism
- Published: 1553 Ferrara (FE)
- Publication place: Italy

The Ferrara Bible was a 1553 publication of a Judeo-Spanish version of the Hebrew Bible used by Sephardi Jews. It was the initiative of Yom-Tob ben Levi Athias (the Portuguese marrano known before his return to Judaism as Alvaro de Vargas, (Note: In a number of historical studies, it is stated that the Portuguese name of Yom-Tob Athias was Jerónimo de Vargas. Yet, as it demonstrated by Aron Leoni (La nazione ebraica spagnola e portoghese di Ferrara (1492-1559), Florence, pp. 443, 1089) his actual given name was Alvaro, while Jerónimo de Vargas was his son and co-editor.) as typographer) and Abraham Usque (the Portuguese marrano Duarte Pinhel, as translator). It was largely paid for by the 16th century entrepreneur, Dona Gracia, the world's wealthiest woman at that time, and includes a poetic dedication to her.

This version is a revision of a translation that had long circulated among Spanish Jews. It is more formally entitled Biblia en Lengua Española Traducida Palabra por Palabra de la Verdad Hebrayca por Muy Excelentes Letrados, Vista y Examinada por el Oficio de la Inquisicion. Con Privilegio del Ylustrissimo Señor Duque de Ferrara. ("The Bible in the Spanish Language, Translated word for word from the true Hebrew by very excellent Literati, Viewed and Examined by the Office of the Inquisition [though the Inquisition would not have passed such a work]. With the Privilege of the most Illustrious Lord Duke of Ferrara.)

Two editions were printed simultaneously, one dedicated to the duke, and one for the Jewish public dedicated to Gracia Mendes Nasi.

== Language ==
The translation follows the Hebrew syntax rather than that of everyday Judaeo-Spanish (Ladino). It is written in the Latin alphabet, with diacritics, which distinguishes it from other bibles printed in Constantinople in Hebrew script.

The tetragrammaton is translated as A. (for Adonai).

It was a basis for the 1569 translation of Casiodoro de Reina as shown in the "Amonestacion al Lector" found before the biblical text written by the translator himself wherein he writes the following:

De la vieja Translacion Española del Viejo Testamento, impressa en Ferrara, nos auemos ayudado en semejantes necessidades mas que de ninguan otra que hasta aora ayamos visto, no tanto por auer ella siempre acertado mas que las otras en casos semejantes, quanto por darnos la natural y primera significacion de los vocablos Hebreos, y las differencias de los tiempos de los verbos, como estan en el mismo texto, en lo qual es obra digna de mayor estima (à juyzio de todos los que la entienden) que quantas hasta aora ay: y por esta tan singular ayuda, de laqual las otras translaciones no há gozado, esperamos que la nuestra por lo menos no será inferior à ninguna deellas.

Translation:

Of the old Spanish translation of the Old Testament, published in Ferrara, we have availed ourselves hereof more than any other that we have seen thus far, not simply due to it always being accurate in such things, but rather because it gives us the natural and first meaning of Hebrew terms, and the differences between the tenses of the verbs as found in the same text; it is a work that is worthy of greater esteem (in the judgement of all those that understand it) than the many others found to this day: and by this exceptional aid, of which the other translations have not taken advantage, we hope that ours will not be considered inferior to any of them.

== See also ==
- Gracia Mendes Nasi
- Reina-Valera
- Spanish translations of the Bible
- Ercole II d'Este, Duke of Ferrara at the time
