= Chapel of Antiguo Seminario Santa María de Jesús =

- Capilla del Antiguo Seminario Santa María de Jesús (Spanish)
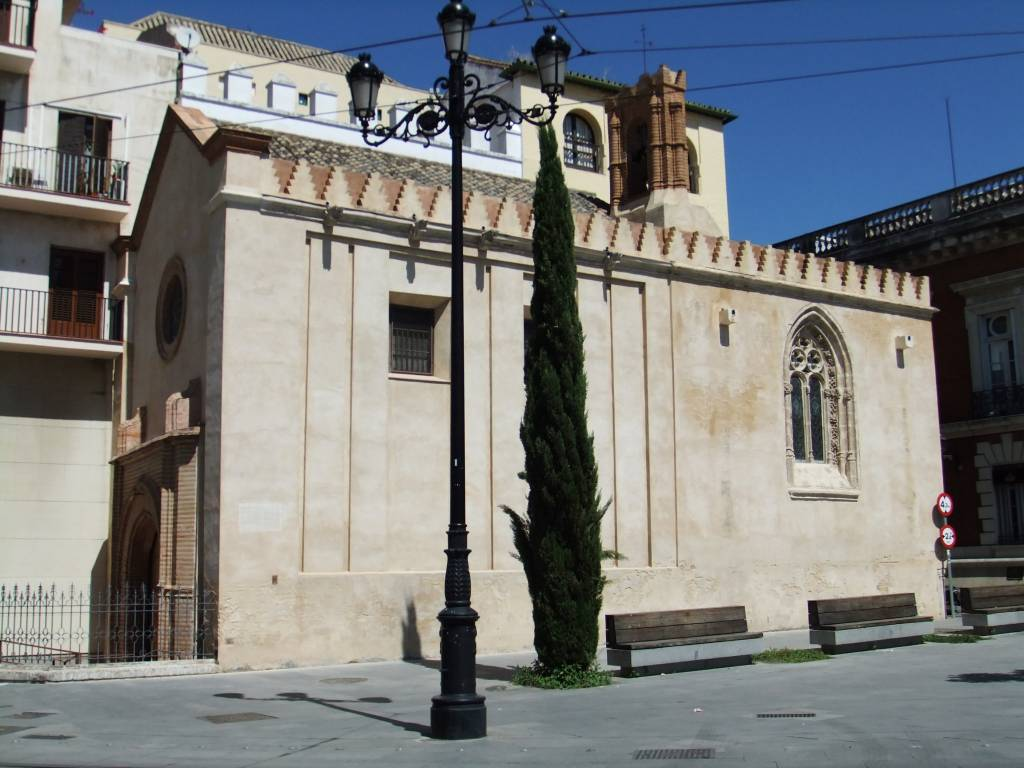

- Location within Spain
- 37.382872°N 5.993351°W
- Location: Sevilla, Spain

Spanish Cultural Heritage
- Official name: Capilla del Antiguo Seminario Santa María de Jesús
- Type: Non-movable
- Criteria: Monument
- Designated: 8 May 1901
- Reference no.: RI-51-0000079

The Chapel of Antiguo Seminario Santa María de Jesús (Spanish: Capilla del Antiguo Seminario Santa María de Jesús) is a chapel located in Sevilla, Spain. It was declared Bien de Interés Cultural in 8 May 1901.

== See also ==
- [List of Bien de Interés Cultural in the Province of Seville]]
