= Margaret Elter =

Margaret Elter (c. 1525 - c. 1 February 1553), or Marguerite d'Elter, was a noblewoman from Guelders, relative of Anna 't Serclaes (wife of John Hooper, bishop of Gloucester), and Protestant refugee in Cambridge and Strasbourg.

== Life ==
Margaret Elter was educated in a convent in Mons, Hainaut, in the Low Countries. In 1547 she fled for religious reasons to Basel, where she joined the household of Jacques de Bourgogne, Lord of Falais. In March 1548 at Strasbourg she married the Spanish Protestant Francisco de Enzinas, and shortly afterwards moved with him to England. A daughter was born in Cambridge the following year.

When her husband returned to Strasbourg in November 1549, she refused to accompany him, citing the baby's delicate health and the perils of winter travel. She finally joined him in June 1550, accompanied by her niece Anna Elter. A second daughter was born at Strasbourg in 1551. The plague took hold of the city in the winter of 1552/3, and Margaret Elter died about 1 February 1553, little more than a month after the death of her husband. The orphans, Margarita and Beatriz, became wards of the city. Philip Melanchthon offered to take one of them into his home in Wittenberg, but the city refused.

In July 1555, Anna Elter married the cavalry officer Guillaume Rabot de Salène, in a match arranged by the Elector Palatine. The couple promoted the interests of the orphans and probably engineered the publication of Enzinas's Mémoires (which had already attracted the interest of the Protestant martyrologists John Foxe and Ludwig Rabus) to secure funds for their maintenance. By these means they succeeded in their goal of keeping the children out of the hands of Catholic relatives in Spain.
