= Diego de Enzinas =

Spanish writer

Diego de Enzinas (c. 1520 – c. 15 March 1547), or Jacobus Dryander, Protestant scholar of Spanish origin, active in the Low Countries and Rome, executed by the Roman Inquisition.

Diego de Enzinas was the brother of the better-known Francisco de Enzinas. He was born into a successful merchant family in Burgos, Spain, a little before 1520. After going to the Low Countries for commercial training, he enrolled at the Collegium Trilingue of Louvain on 28 October 1538. He also studied in Paris. In March 1542 he was in Antwerp supervising the printing of a little book titled Breve y compendiosa institución de la religión cristiana. It was a translation made by his brother Francisco of John Calvin's 1538 Latin Catechism, to which was appended a translation of Martin Luther's Freedom of the Christian Man. It also contains an original prologue that may be the work of Diego (rather than Francisco) expressing a Protestant idea of justification by faith in language that would be familiar to Spanish alumbrados and Catholic humanists. Marcel Bataillon calls it 'an exceptional piece of Protestant spiritual writing' (‘un trozo excepcional de literatura espiritual protestante'). Diego planned to smuggle copies of the book into Spain, but the Spanish Inquisition got wind of the plan. As a result, his family persuaded him to seek the relative safety of Rome, where he became part of an evangelical circle. However, the Roman Inquisition was reinstated there in 1542, and Diego fell foul of it after a letter he had written to Luther was intercepted. Under torture, Diego named the members of his religious circle. He was tried, and burned at the stake on or about 15 March 1547.
