= Abraham Usque =

Portuguese publisher

- Born: Abraham ben Salomon Usque; Portugal
- Occupation: Publisher

Abraham ben Salomon Usque (given the Christian name Duarte Pinhel) was a 16th-century publisher. Usque was born in Portugal to a Jewish family and fled the Portuguese Inquisition for Ferrara, Italy, around 1543.

In Ferrara, Usque worked with Yom-Tob ben Levi Athias (the Marrano Jerónimo de Vargas), a Spanish typographer. Drawing on various earlier translations, Usque produced a new translation of the Hebrew Bible (the Tanakh) into Spanish. It was entitled "Biblia en Lengua Española Traducida Palabra por Palabra de la Verdad Hebrayca por Muy Excelentes Letrados, Vista y Examinada por el Oficio de la Inquisicion. Con Privilegio del Ylustrissimo Señor Duque de Ferrara." Usque intended the book for sale both to the Sephardic diaspora and to Christian Spaniards. For this purpose, he submitted a copy to the Inquisition, hoping to receive an imprimatur, and printed some books with a dedication to the Duke of Ferrara. Copies intended for sale to Jews were dedicated to Dona Gracia Nasi. It was published in folio at Ferrara in 1553 and known as the Ferrara Bible. This edition has become scarce, but a second was published in Holland in 1630. In this translation, the Hebrew text is rendered verbatim.

Other books published by Usque included the Portuguese classic Menina e Moça by Bernardim Ribeiro, and Consolação às Tribulações de Israel by Samuel Usque, whose kinship with Abraham has not yet been clarified.
