= Monastery of San Isidoro del Campo =

Ex-Monastery of San Isidoro del Campo
- Monasterio de San Isidoro del Campo (Spanish)
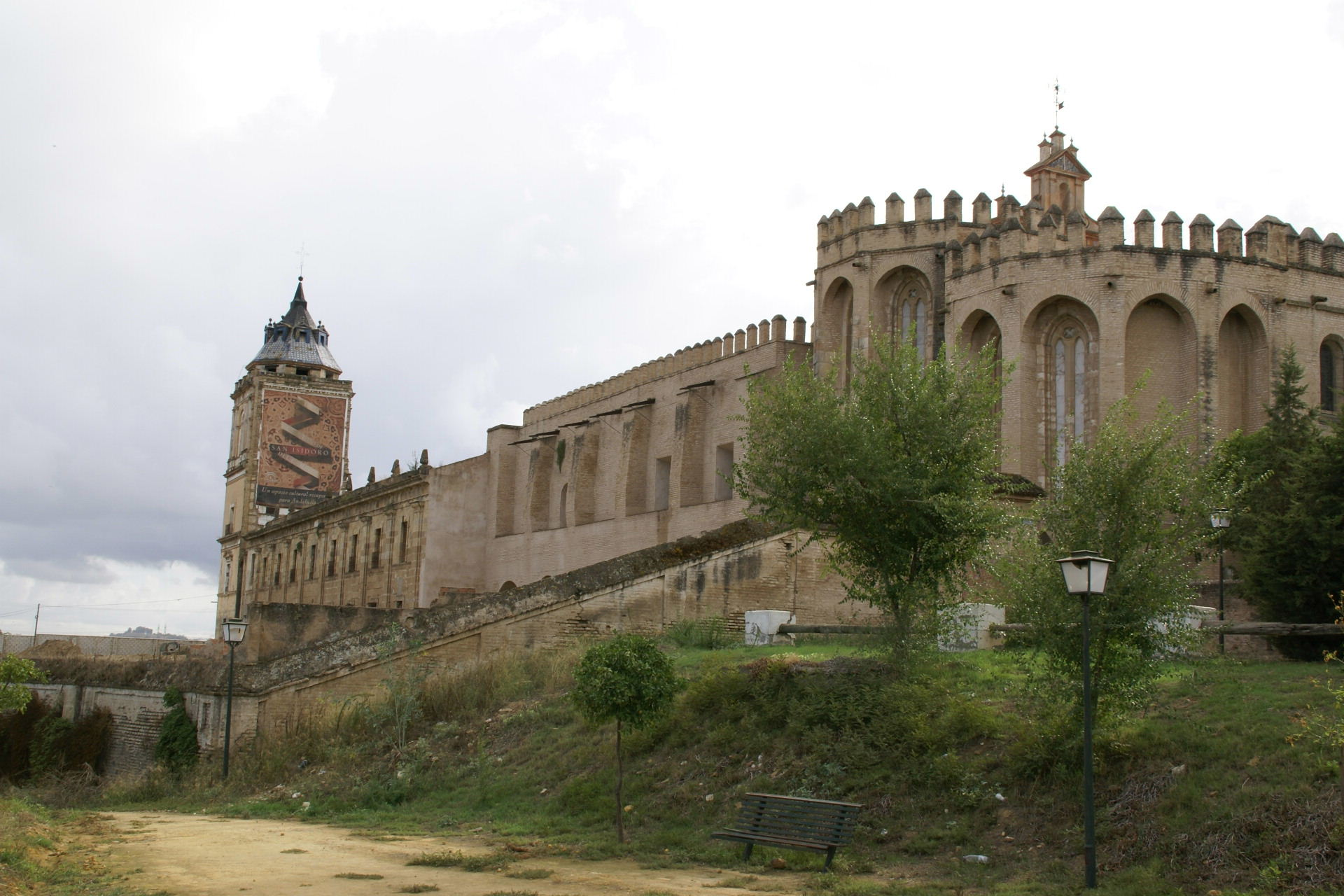

- Location within Spain
- 37.434252°N 6.036582°W
- Location: Santiponce, Spain

Spanish Cultural Heritage
- Official name: Monasterio de San Isidoro del Campo
- Type: Non-movable
- Criteria: Monument
- Designated: 1872
- Reference no.: RI-51-0000010

The Monastery of San Isidoro del Campo (Spanish: monasterio de San Isidoro del Campo) is a monastery located in Santiponce, Spain. It was declared Bien de Interés Cultural (Spanish Property of Cultural Interest) in 1872.

The monastery was founded in 1301 by Alonso Pérez de Guzmán.

The interior houses an altarpiece by Juan Martínez Montañes.

== See also ==
- List of Bien de Interés Cultural in the Province of Seville
