= Francisco de Enzinas =

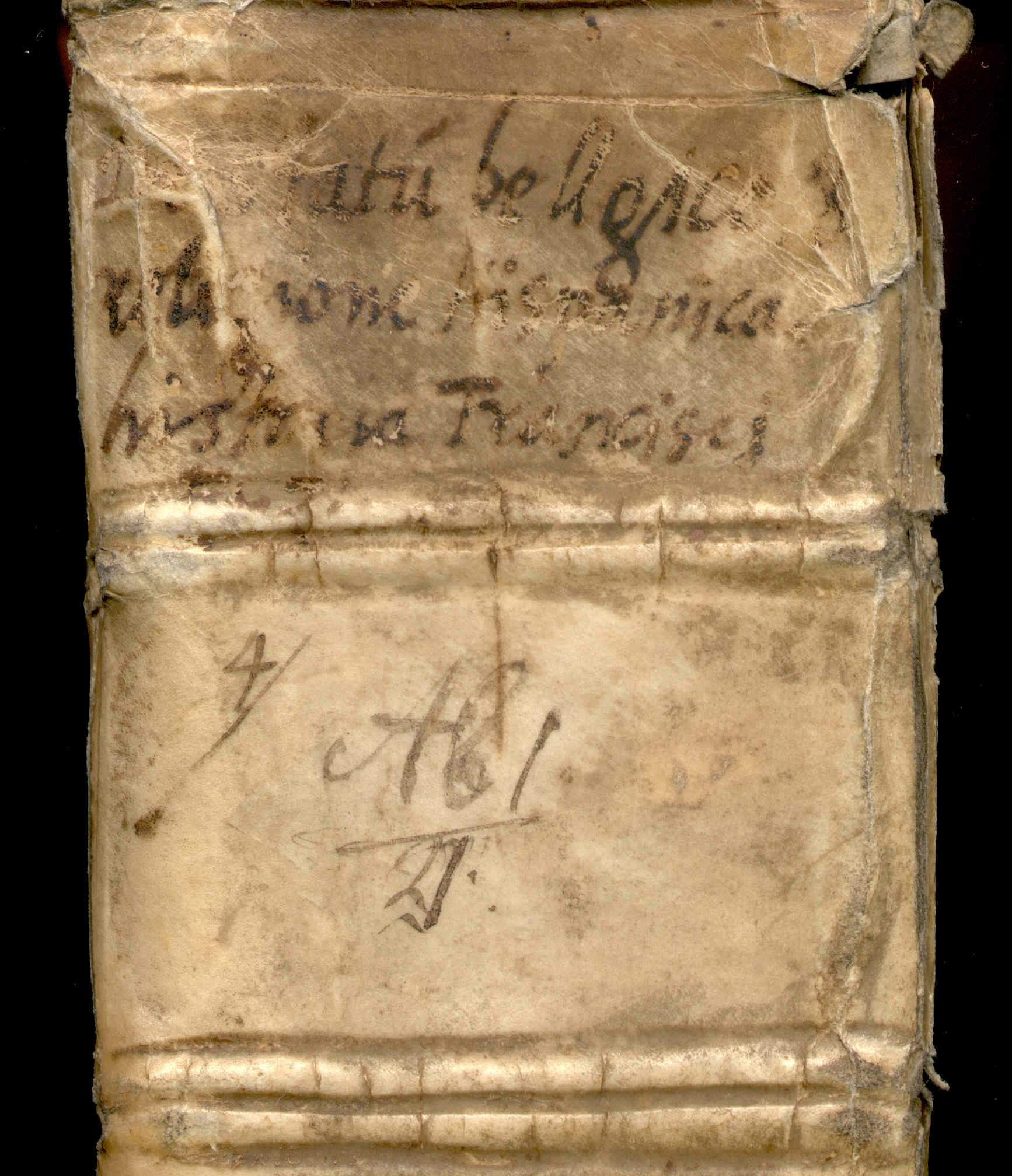

Francisco de Enzinas (1 November 1518? – 30 December 1552), also known by the humanist name Francis Dryander (from the Greek drus, which can be translated encina in Spanish), was a classical scholar, translator, author, Protestant reformer and apologist of Spanish origin.

== Family and education ==
Francisco de Enzinas was born in Burgos, Spain, probably on 1 November 1518. (Herminjard, Correspondance des réformateurs, v9 (1897), p462, n3.) He was one of ten children of the successful wool merchant Juan de Enzinas. The mater of his correspondence was his stepmother, Beatriz de Santa Cruz, whose family included the wealthy Low Countries merchant Jerónimo de Salamanca Santa Cruz and the churchman Alonso de Santa Cruz, treasurer of Burgos Cathedral.

Enzinas was sent to the Low Countries around 1536 for commercial training, but on 4 June 1539 he enrolled at the Collegium Trilingue of Louvain. There he fell under the spell of humanist scholarship as popularized by Desiderius Erasmus. Around that time he developed an acquaintance with the Polish Reformer Jan Łaski. (Epistolario, letter 1.) He also made a connection with the University of Oxford, as shown by a letter he wrote to a certain Edmund Crispin of Oriel College, later published by the martyrologist John Foxe in the first edition of his Acts and Monuments. (Pratt ed. (1870), v6, p139, n1.) The same work, more popularly known as Foxe's Book of Martyrs, also contains eyewitness accounts originally penned by Enzinas.

A brother, Diego de Enzinas, studied with him at the Collegium Trilingue and collaborated on a Spanish edition of the 1538 Catechism of John Calvin and the Freedom of the Christian Man by Martin Luther, printed at Antwerp in 1542. Diego was burned during the Roman Inquisition in 1547.

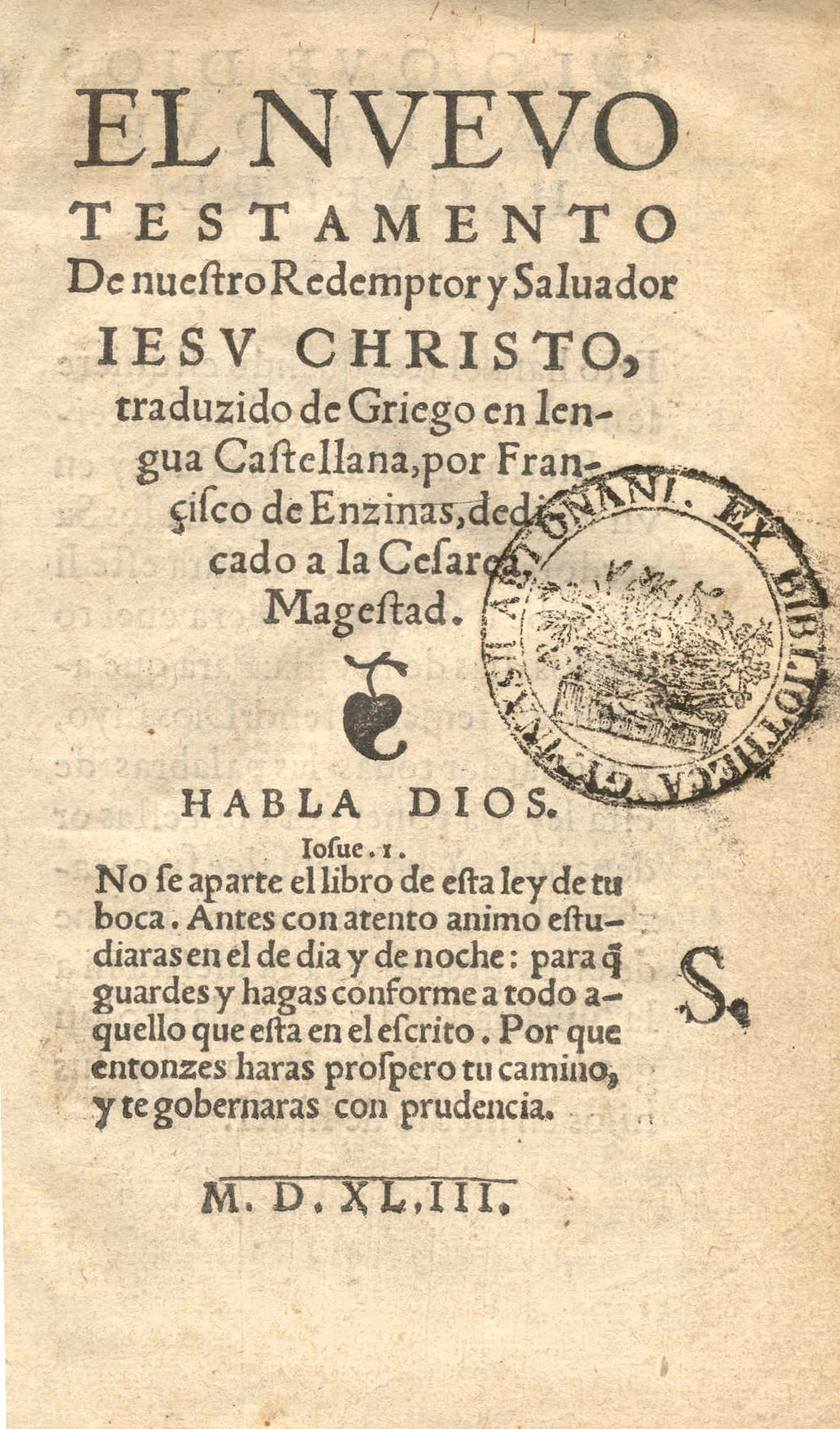
The New Testament translated by Enzinas, published in Antwerp (1543)

== New Testament translation ==
In the summer of 1541, Enzinas went to Paris where he was present at the deathbed of his relative, Pedro de Lerma, dean of the faculty of theology at the Sorbonne. On 27 October 1541, he enrolled at the University of Wittenberg. His desire to study there with the famed hellenist Philip Melanchthon was an extension of his admiration for Erasmus.

In Melanchthon's house, Enzinas finished a translation of the New Testament into Spanish. He took it to Antwerp to be printed by Steven Mierdman in 1543. The Spanish New Testament was dedicated to Emperor Charles V who also received the first printed volume during a personal interview with Enzinas in Brussels. Emperor Charles V passed the book on to his confessor Pedro de Soto, who then ordered Enzinas arrest. An attempt to confiscate the printed copies of the New Testament was only partly successful.

Enzinas escaped from the Vrunte prison in Brussels in February 1545. He made his way back to Wittenberg and wrote an account of his adventures, titled De statu Belgico et religione Hispanica. It is better known as his Mémoires. The same year in Basel, he edited and published an account of the murder of his friend and fellow Protestant Juan Díaz, the Historia vera, which became a best seller in the overheated religious atmosphere of the day.

Enzinas's New Testament had a marked influence on subsequent translations, of which the most important was the Reina-Valera version, still the standard Bible of the Protestant Spanish-speaking world.

== Marriage, England ==
In March 1548, Enzinas married fellow religious exile Margaret Elter (d. 1553), a native of Guelders. Soon after, the couple moved to England at the urging of Martin Bucer, the reformer of Strasbourg, who also had set his sights on the relative safety of Edward VI's realm. Thomas Cranmer took the couple into his palace at Lambeth and soon afterward appointed Enzinas to teach Greek at Cambridge. His status at the university is uncertain; there is no evidence that he held a professorship, and more likely was paid by Cranmer to cover an extended absence of Regius Professor of Greek John Cheke.

Enzinas's move to the university was also influenced by the wish of Catherine Willoughby, Duchess of Suffolk, that he should tutor one of her sons, probably Charles. (Epistolario, letter 45i.) The Duchess combined Protestant convictions with a Spanish bloodline traced through her mother, Maria de Salinas, lady in waiting to Catherine of Aragon. (In this connection, it is worth noting that Enzinas's translation of Plutarch's Lives was published under the pseudonym, 'Juan Castro de Salinas'.)

== Last years on the Continent ==
Enzinas left his wife and newborn daughter in England at the end of 1549 to print Spanish translations of Lucian, Livy, and Plutarch. The reasons are not difficult to understand: his primary interest was publishing Spanish literature, and he knew and trusted the Continental printers more than any in England. In June 1550 his family joined him in Strasbourg. There he built what was effectively a small Spanish publishing house, which for the next two and a half years produced editions of classical works and Old Testament books in Spanish. A second daughter was born in 1551.

Enzinas came close to publishing his major life project, a complete Bible translation, but died before seeing it through the press. Carlos Gilly has demonstrated, from the Old Testament portions issued at Strasbourg, that Enzinas translated from the Latin version of Sébastien Castellio rather than the original Hebrew. It is possible that the manuscripts passed into the hands of Casiodoro de Reina, who published his own Bible in 1569. Enzinas commissioned a remarkable set of engravings and capitals for his project, and some have recently been discovered in other editions of the period.

Enzinas died on 30 December 1552, a victim of plague at Strasbourg; Margaret Elter died about 1 February 1553. Their two daughters, Margarita and Beatriz, became wards of the city and were the objects of an extended custody battle with Beatriz de Santa Cruz. As late as 1566 she was still claiming guardianship over the girls, though they were by then living in Flanders.

== Posthumous editions ==
Enzinas's Mémoires were published posthumously in French translation (Ste. Marie aux Mines, 1558), probably through the efforts of Margaret Elter's relatives in Strasbourg. They were translated into German only a hundred years ago, and have been rendered, in the past half century, into modern French, Spanish, and Dutch.

Enzinas's collected letters appeared in 1995, and include correspondence with Philip Melanchthon, Heinrich Bullinger, Martin Bucer, John Calvin, and other religious figures, students, rulers, and printers of the period.
