= List of sieges =

A chronological list of sieges follows.

== Ancient ==
=== Before 1000 BC ===
- Siege of Aratta (c. 2600 BC) this siege is semi or entirely mythical.
- Siege of Uruk (c. 2580 BC)
- Siege of Qabra (1780 BC)
- Siege of Hiritum (1764 BC)
- Siege of Larsa (1763 BC)
- Siege of Avaris (c. 1550 BC)
- Siege of Sharuhen (c. 1530 BC)
- Siege of Megiddo (c. 1457 BC)
- Siege of Jericho (c. 1400 BC)
- Siege of Dapur (1269 BC)

==== 10th century BC ====
- Siege of Rabbah (10th century BC) (Bible reference: II Samuel 11–12)
- Siege of Abel-beth-maachah (10th century BC) (Bible reference: II Samuel 20:15–22)
- Siege of Gezer (10th century BC)
- Sack of Jerusalem (925 BC) by Egyptian pharaoh Shoshenq I

==== 9th century BC ====
- Siege of Gath (city) (ca. 830 BC) (Bible reference: II Kings 12:17/18)
- Siege of Samaria (ancient city) (9th century BC) (Bible reference: II Kings 6:24 – 7:7)

==== 8th century BC ====
- Siege of Tyre (724–720 BC) by the Assyrians under Shalmaneser V and Sargon II
- Siege of Gezer (c. 733 BC)
- Siege of Hermopolis (701 BC)
- Siege of Azekah (701 BC)
- Siege of Lachish (701 BC)
- Siege of Jerusalem (701 BC) by the Assyrians under Sennacherib
- Siege of Tyre (701 BC) by the Assyrians under Sennacherib

==== 7th century BC ====
- Siege of Babylon (689 BC)
- Siege of Tyre (671 BC) by the Assyrians under Esarhaddon
- Siege of Tyre (663 BC) by the Assyrians under Ashurbanipal
- Fall of Ashdod (635 BC)
- Fall of Assur (614 BC)
- Battle of Nineveh (612 BC)
- Fall of Harran (610 BC)
- Siege of Harran (609 BC)

==== 6th century BC ====
- Siege of Jerusalem (597 BC) by Nebuchadnezzar II
- Siege of Jerusalem (587 BC) by Nebuchadnezzar II
- Siege of Tyre (586–573 BC) by Nebuchadnezzar II
- Siege of Sardis (547 BC)
- Siege of Gaza (525 BC)
- Siege of Memphis (525 BC)
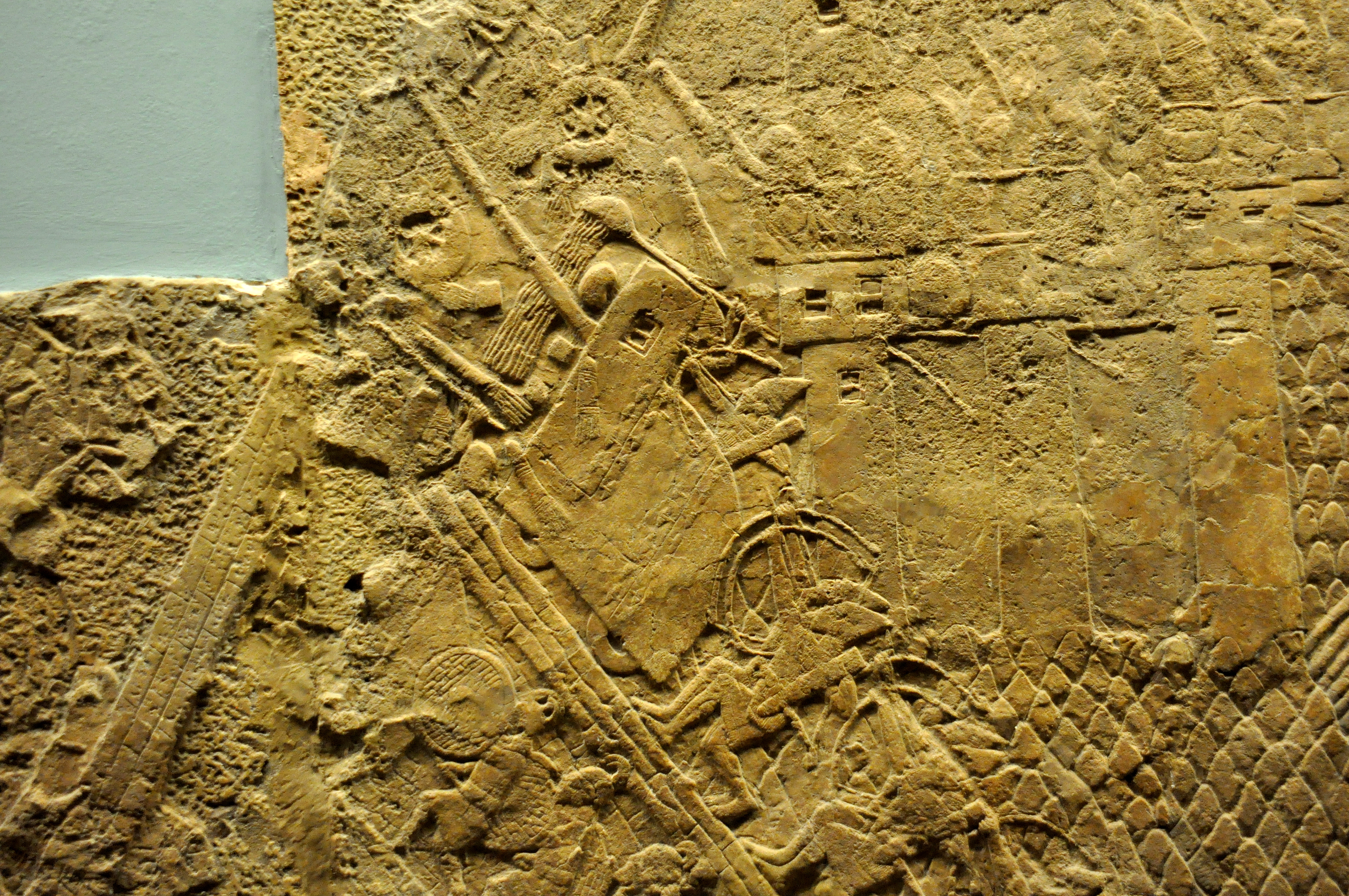
Depiction of the siege of Lachish from an Assyrian wall relief

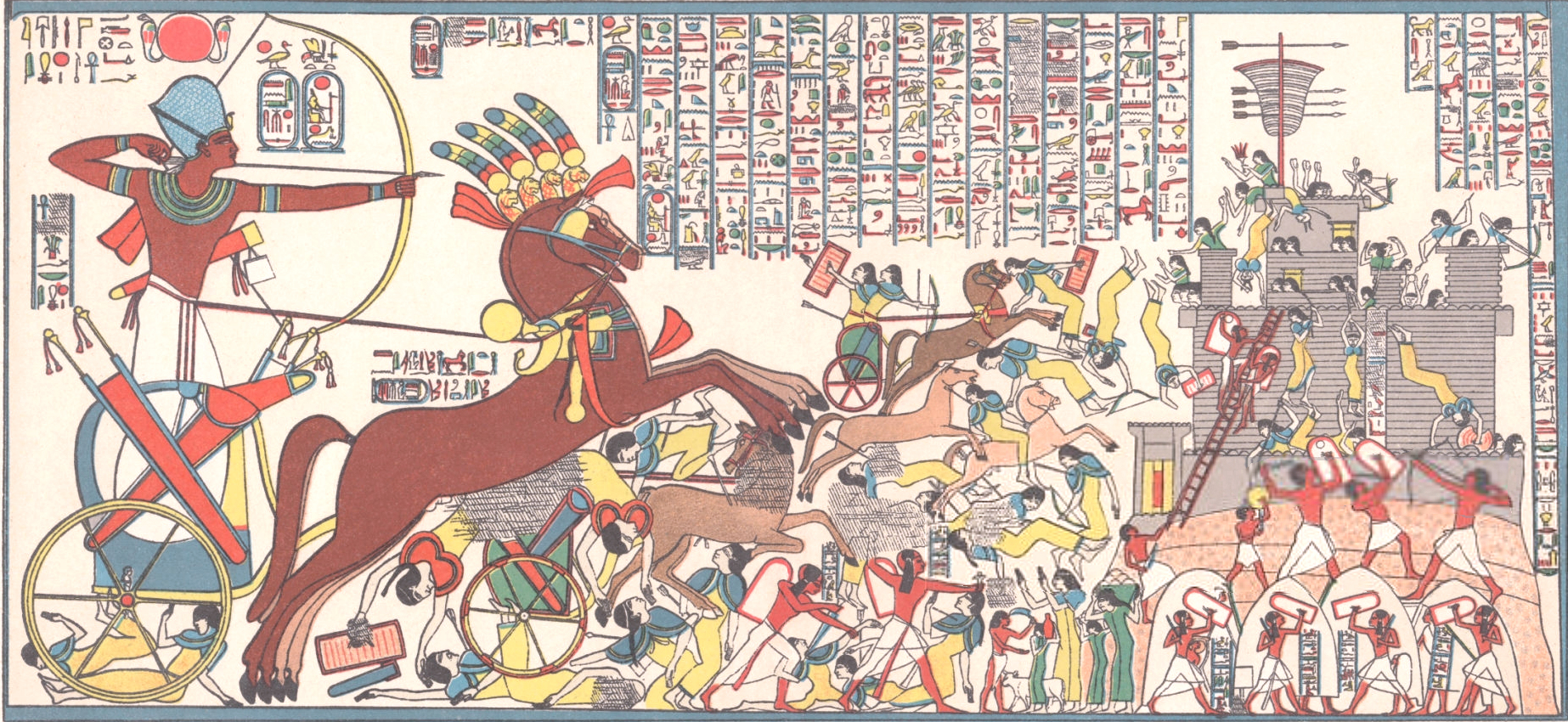
A mural from the tomb of Ramesses II in Thebes depicting the siege of Dapur

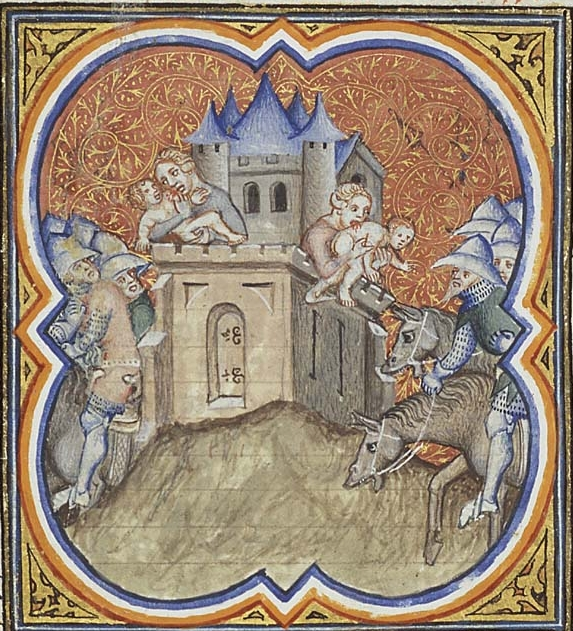
A Medieval depiction of the siege of Jerusalem in 587 BC

==== 5th century BC ====
- Siege of Naxos (499 BC) – part of the Ionian Revolt and the Greco-Persian Wars
- Siege of Amathus (498–497 BC) – Ionian Revolt
- Siege of Soli (497 BC) – Ionian Revolt
- Siege of Miletus (494 BC) – Ionian Revolt
- Siege of Lindos (490 BC) – part of the First Persian invasion of Greece
- Siege of Eretria (490 BC) – part of the First Persian invasion of Greece
- Siege of Paros (489 BC)
- Siege of Himera (480 BC) – Sicilian Wars
- Siege of Potidaea (480 BC) – Second Persian invasion of Greece
- Siege of Olynthus (480 BC) – second Persian invasion of Greece
- Siege of Sestos (479 BC) – Greco-Persian Wars
- Siege of Byzantium (478 BC) – Greco-Persian Wars
- Siege of Eion (477–476 BC) – Wars of the Delian League
- Siege of Naxos (469 BC) – Wars of the Delian League
- Siege of Phaselis (469 BC) – Wars of the Delian League
- Siege of Mycenae (468 BC)
- Siege of Thasos (465–463 BC) – Thasian rebellion
- Siege of Memphis (459–455 BC) – Wars of the Delian League
- Siege of Aegina (458 BC) – First Peloponnesian War
- Siege of Tanagra (457 BC) – First Peloponnesian War
- Siege of Prosopitis (455–454 BC) – Wars of the Delian League
- Siege of Kition (451 BC) – Wars of the Delian League
- Siege of Samos (440–439 BC) – Samian War
- Siege of Epidamnos (435 BC)
- Siege of Potidaea (432–430 BC) – Peloponnesian War
- Siege of Methone (431 BC) – Peloponnesian War
- Siege of Pheia (431 BC) – Peloponnesian War
- Siege of Thronium (431 BC) – Peloponnesian War
- Siege of Epidaurus (430 BC) – Peloponnesian War
- Siege of Plataea (429–427 BC) – Peloponnesian War
- Siege of Mytilene (428–427 BC) – Peloponnesian War
- Siege of Methymna (428 BC) – Peloponnesian War
- Siege of Naupactus (427 BC) – Peloponnesian War
- Siege of Pylos (425 BC) – Peloponnesian War
- Siege of Sphacteria (425 BC) – Peloponnesian War
- Siege of Nisaea (424 BC) – Peloponnesian War
- Siege of Delium (424 BC) – Peloponnesian War
- Siege of Mende (423 BC) – Peloponnesian War
- Siege of Scione (423–421 BC) – Peloponnesian War
- Siege of Torone (422 BC) – Peloponnesian War
- Siege of Stagirus (422 BC) – Peloponnesian War
- Siege of Galepsus (422 BC) – Peloponnesian War
- Siege of Epidaurus (418–417 BC) – Peloponnesian War
- Siege of Hysiae (417 BC) – Peloponnesian War
- Siege of Orneae (417 BC) – Peloponnesian War
- Siege of Melos (416 BC) – Peloponnesian War
- Siege of Syracuse (415–413 BC) – the Athenian siege
- Siege of Miletus (412 BC) – Peloponnesian War
- Siege of Selinus (409 BC) – Sicilian Wars
- Siege of Himera (409 BC) – Sicilian Wars
- Siege of Chalcedon (409 BC) – Peloponnesian War
- Siege of Byzantium (408 BC) – Peloponnesian War
- Siege of Methymna (406 BC) – Peloponnesian War
- Siege of Mytilene (406 BC) – Peloponnesian War
- Siege of Akragas (406 BC) – Sicilian Wars
- Siege of Samos (405 BC) – Peloponnesian War
- Siege of Athens (405–404 BC) – Peloponnesian War

==== 4th century BC ====
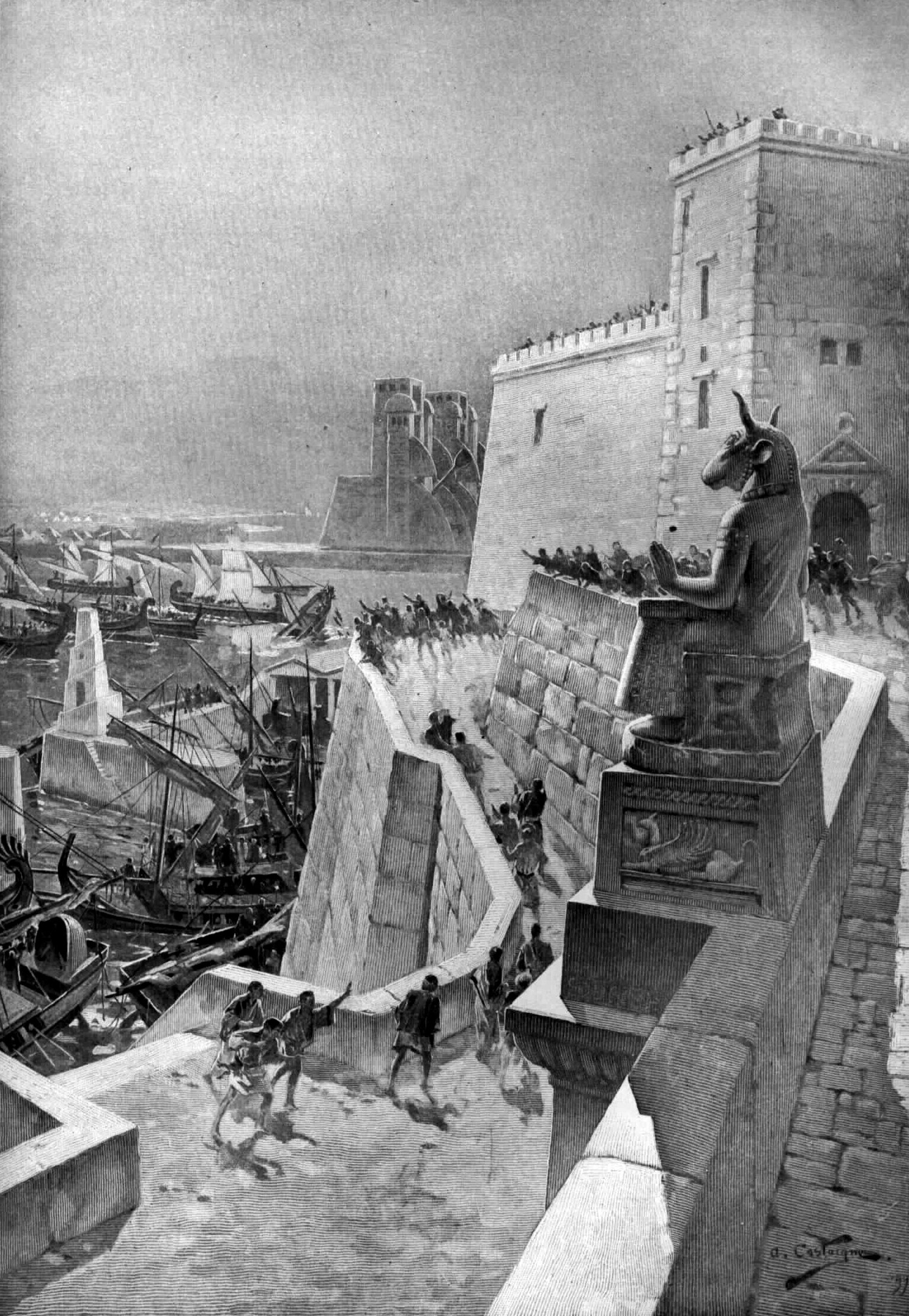
A naval action during the siege of Tyre (332 BC), by Andre Castaigne (1898–1899)

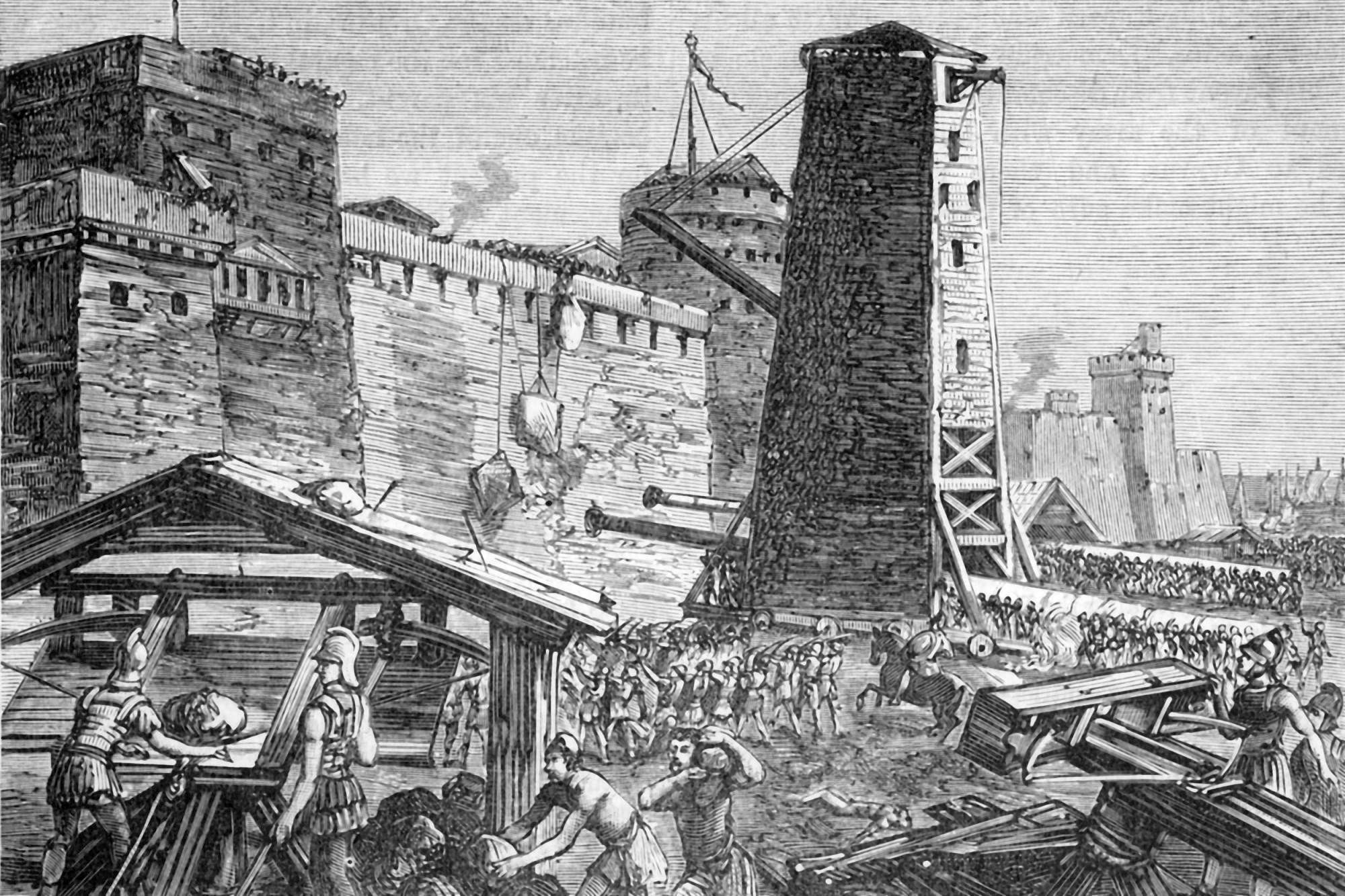
Siege of Rhodes (305 BC) (1882 illustration).

- Siege of Motya (398 BC) – Sicilian Wars
- Siege of Segesta (397 BC) – Sicilian Wars
- Siege of Syracuse (397 BC) – Sicilian Wars
- Siege of Tauromenium (394 BC) – Sicilian Wars
- Siege of Theodosia (389 BC) – Bosporan-Heracleote War
- Siege of Rhegium (386 BC)
- Siege of Samos (366 BC)
- Siege of Theodosia (c. 365 BC) – Bosporan-Heracleote War
- Siege of Theodosia (c. 360 BC) – Bosporan-Heracleote War
- Siege of Amphipolis (357 BC) – Rise of Macedon
- Siege of Pydna (357 BC) – Rise of Macedon
- Siege of Potidaea (356 BC) – Rise of Macedon
- Siege of Methone (356 BC) – Rise of Macedon
- Siege of Olynthus (349–348 BC) – Third Sacred War
- Siege of Syracuse (343 BC) – Sicilian Wars
- Siege of Perinthos (340 BC) – Third Sacred War
- Siege of Byzantion (340 BC) – Third Sacred War
- Siege of Pelium (335 BC) – Wars of Alexander the Great
- Siege of Miletus (334 BC) – Wars of Alexander the Great
- Siege of Halicarnassus (334 BC) – Wars of Alexander the Great
- Siege of Tyre (332 BC) – Wars of Alexander the Great
- Siege of Gaza (332 BC) – Wars of Alexander the Great
- Siege of Cyropolis (329 BC) – Wars of Alexander the Great
- Siege of the Sogdian Rock (327 BC) – Wars of Alexander the Great
- Siege of Neapolis (c. 327 BC) – Samnite Wars
- Siege of Massaga (327 BC) – Wars of Alexander the Great
- Siege of Aornos (326 BC) – Wars of Alexander the Great
- Siege of Kot Kamalia (325 BC) – Wars of Alexander the Great
- Siege of Atari (325 BC) – Wars of Alexander the Great
- Siege of the Mallian Citadel (325 BC) – Wars of Alexander the Great
- Siege of Lamia (323 BC) – Lamian War
- Siege of Cyzicus (319 BC) – Wars of the Diadochi
- Siege of Megalopolis (317 BC) – Wars of the Diadochi
- Siege of Tyre (315–314 BC) by Antigonus I Monophthalmus – Wars of the Diadochi
- Siege of Oreus (312 BC) – Wars of the Diadochi
- Siege of Syracuse (311–309 BC) – Sicilian Wars
- Siege of Siracena (309 BC) – Bosporan Civil War
- Siege of Munichia (307 BC) – Wars of the Diadochi
- Siege of Salamis (306 BC) – Wars of the Diadochi
- Siege of Rhodes (305 BC) by Demetrius Poliorcetes

==== 3rd century BC ====
- Siege of Messene (295 BC) – Wars of the Diadochi
- Siege of Thebes (292–291 BC)
- Siege of Athens (287 BC)
- Siege of Syracuse (278 BC) – part of the Pyrrhic War
- Siege of Lilybaeum (278 BC) – part of the Pyrrhic War
- Siege of Sparta (272 BC) – Pyrrhus' invasion of the Peloponnese
- Siege of Agrigentum (261 BC) – part of the First Punic War
- Siege of Aspis (255 BC) – part of the First Punic War
- Siege of Lilybaeum (250 BC) – part of the First Punic War
- Siege of Drepana (249–241 BC) – part of the First Punic War
- Battle of "The Saw" (238 BC) – part of the Mercenary War
- Siege of Tunis (238 BC) – part of the Mercenary War
- Siege of Medion (231 BC) – First Illyrian War
- Siege of Issa (230–229 BC) – First Illyrian War
- Siege of Epidamnus (229 BC) – First Illyrian War

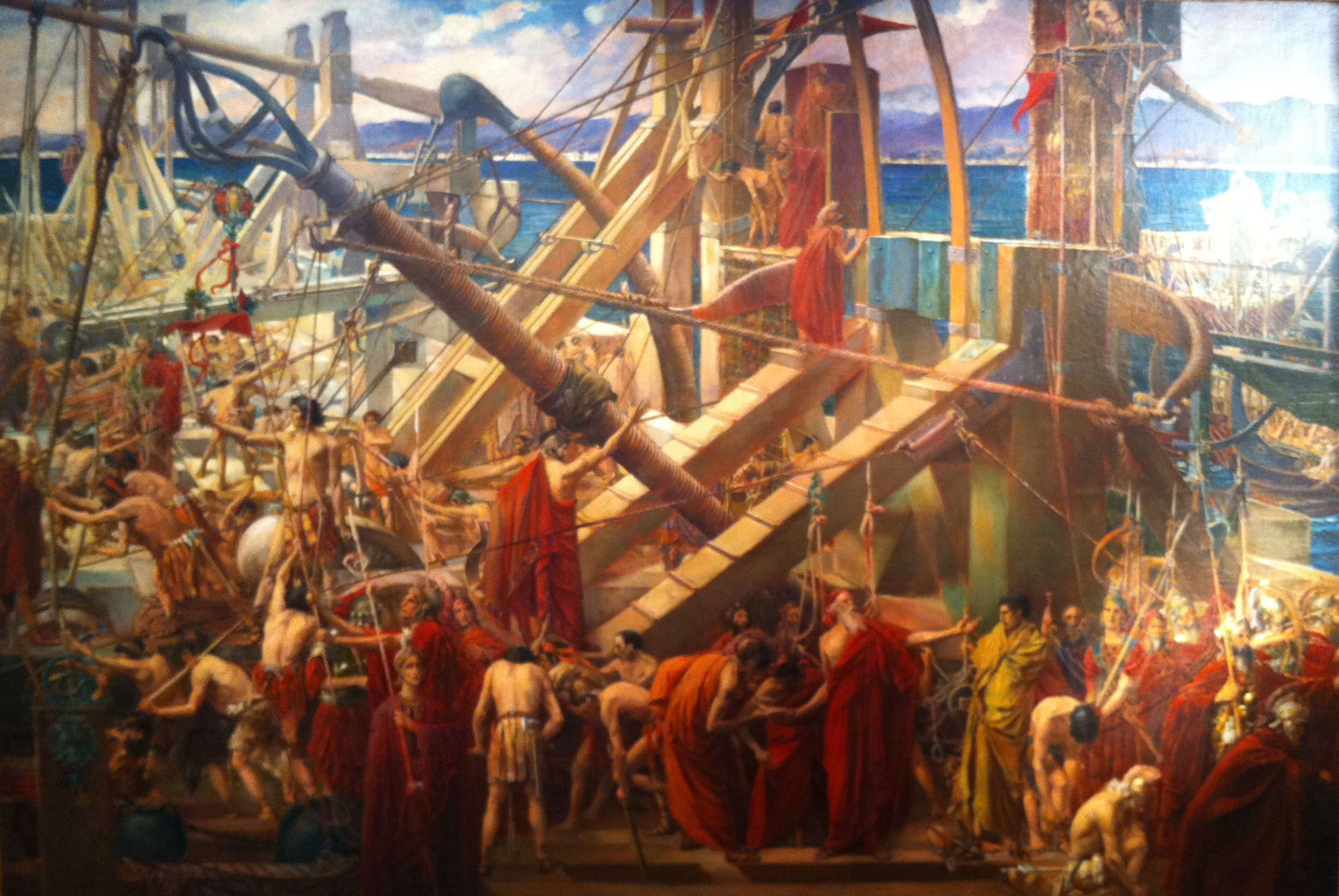
Archimedes Directing the Defenses of Syracuse (213-212 BC), by Thomas Ralph Spence

- Siege of Saguntum (219 BC) – casus belli for the Second Punic War
- Siege of Casilinum (216–215 BC) – Second Punic War
- Siege of Petelia (215 BC) – Second Punic War
- Siege of Arpi (213 BC) – Second Punic War
- Siege of Syracuse (213–212 BC) – the Roman siege
- Siege of Capua (211 BC) – Second Punic War
- Siege of Agrigentum (210 BC) – Second Punic War
- Battle of Cartagena (209 BC) – Second Punic War
- Siege of Manduria (209 BC) – Second Punic War
- Siege of Caulonia (209 BC) – Second Punic War
- Siege of Bactra (208–206 BC)
- Siege of Utica (204 BC) – Second Punic War

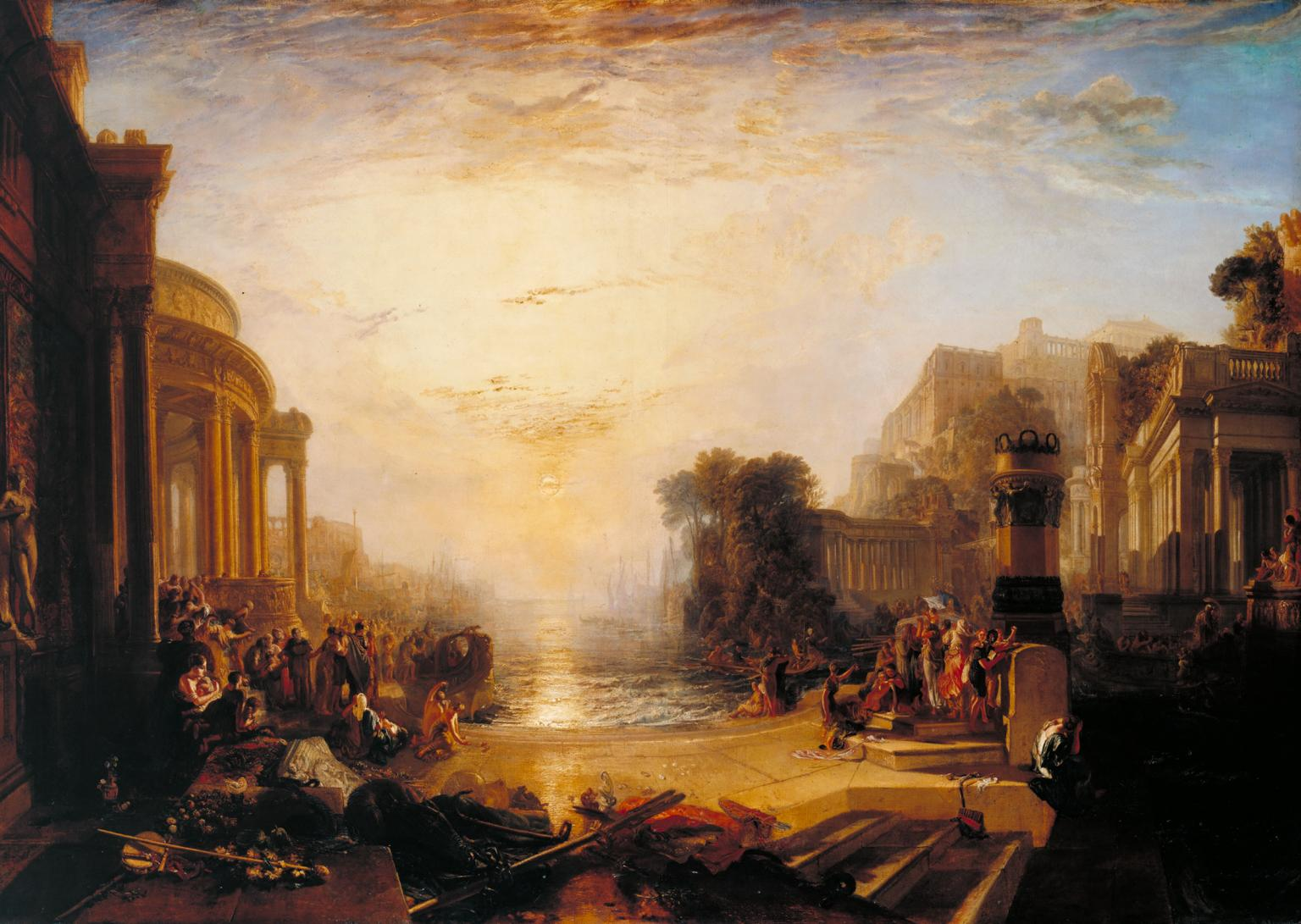
The Decline of the Carthaginian Empire (149–146 BC) by J. M. W. Turner, oil on canvas (1817)

==== 2nd century BC ====
- Siege of Abydos (200 BC) – Cretan War (205–200 BC)
- Siege of Gythium (195 BC) – War against Nabis
- Siege of Eucratideia (169 BC)
- Siege of Carthage (149–146 BC) by Scipio Aemilianus Africanus
- Siege of Numantia (134–133 BC) by Scipio Aemilianus Africanus
- Siege of Cirta (113 BC) – Jugurthine War

==== 1st century BC ====
- Siege of Athens and Piraeus (87–86 BC) – First Mithridatic War
- Siege of Mytilene (81 BC)
- Siege of Cyzicus (73 BC) – Third Mithridatic War
- Siege of Jerusalem (63 BC) by Pompey the Great
- Siege of the Atuatuci (57 BC) – Gallic Wars
- Siege of Avaricum (52 BC) – Gallic Wars
- Siege of Alesia (52 BC) – Gallic Wars
- Siege of Uxellodunum (51 BC) – Gallic Wars
- Siege of Massilia (49 BC) – Caesar's Civil War
- Siege of Utica (49 BC) – Caesar's Civil War
- Siege of Dyrrhachium (48 BC) – Caesar's Civil War
- Siege of Alexandria (48–47 BC) – Caesar's Civil War
- Siege of Jerusalem (37 BC) by Herod the Great
- Siege of Aracillum (25 BC) – Cantabrian Wars

=== 1st century A.D. to 5th century ===
==== 1st century ====
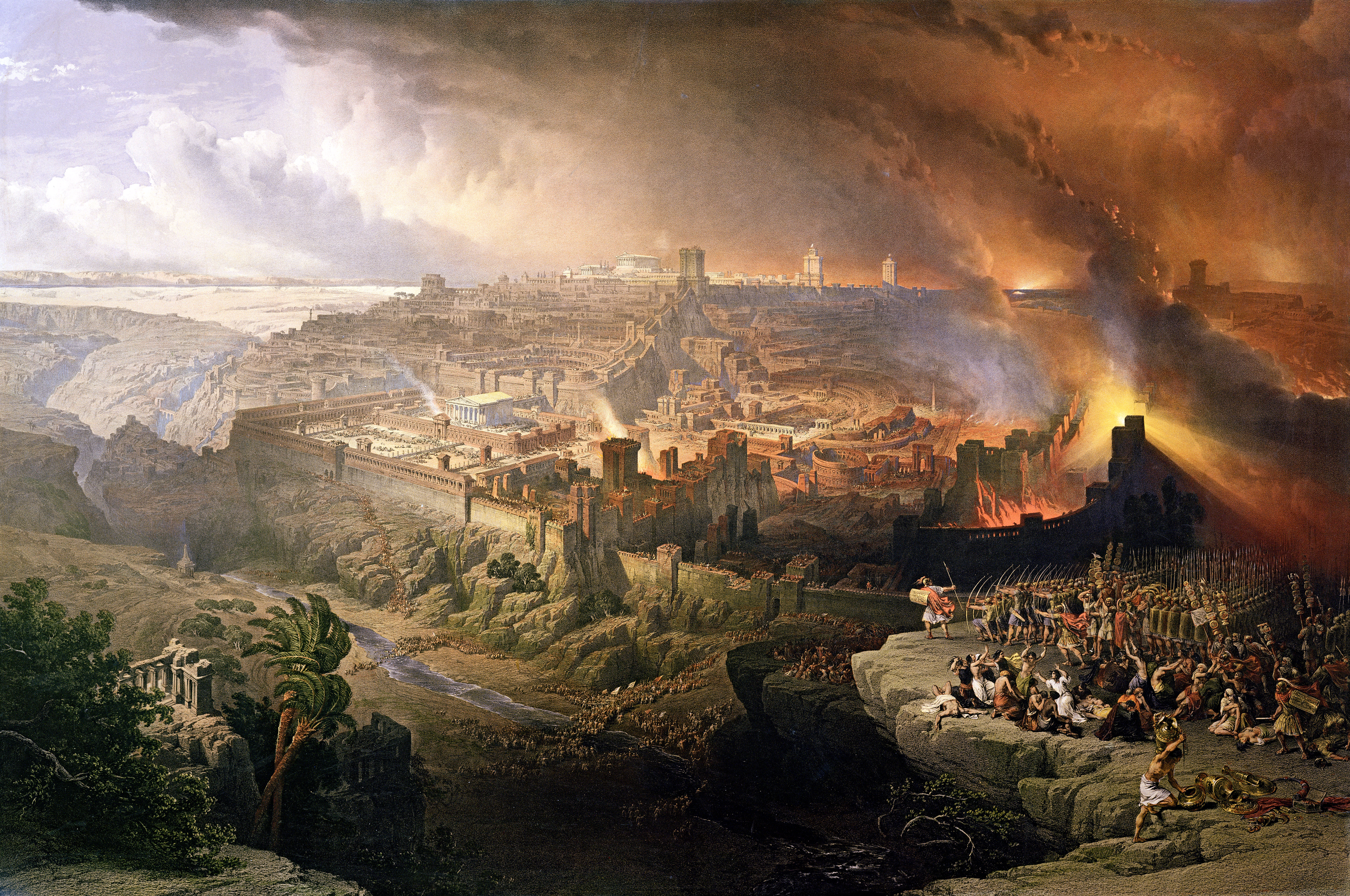
The Siege and Destruction of Jerusalem by the Romans Under the Command of Titus, A.D. 70 by David Roberts, 1850

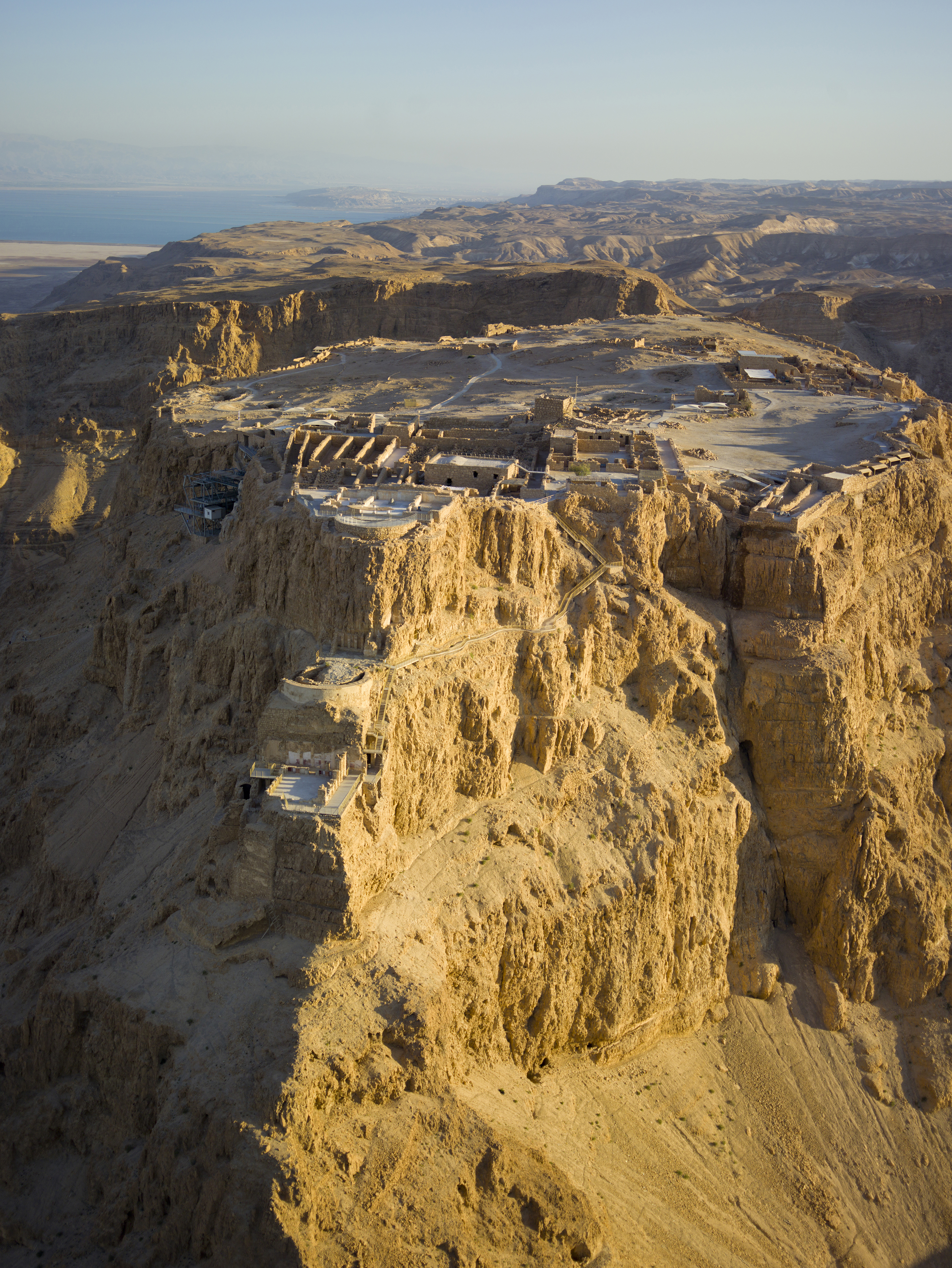
Masada ruins

- Siege of Uspe (49)
- Siege of Camulodunum (60–61)
- Siege of Yodfat (67) – First Jewish–Roman War
- Siege of Gush Halav (67) – first Jewish–Roman War
- Zealot Temple Siege (68) – first Jewish–Roman War
- Siege of Jerusalem (70) – the Roman siege by Titus
- Siege of Masada (72–73 or 73–74) – first Jewish–Roman War

==== 2nd century ====
- Battle of Sarmisegetusa (106) – Trajan's Dacian Wars
- Siege of Hatra (117) – Trajan's Parthian campaign
- Siege of Hatra (193) – by Septimius Severus during Roman–Parthian Wars
- Siege of Byzantium (194–196) by forces of Septimius Severus.
- Siege of Hatra (197) – by Septimius Severus during Roman–Parthian Wars

==== 3rd century ====
- Siege of Jicheng (213)
- Siege of Hatra (220s) by Sasanians under Ardashir I
- Siege of Chencang (229) – Zhuge Liang's Northern Expeditions
- Siege of Aquileia (238) – Year of the Six Emperors
- Siege of Hatra (240-241) by Sasanians under Shapur I
- Siege of Philippopolis (250)
- Siege of Thessalonica (254)
- Siege of Dura-Europos (256)
- Siege of Tyana (272)
- Siege of Palmyra (272)

==== 4th century ====
- Siege of Byzantium (324) – Civil wars of the Tetrarchy
- Siege of Nisibis (337) – Perso-Roman wars of 337–361

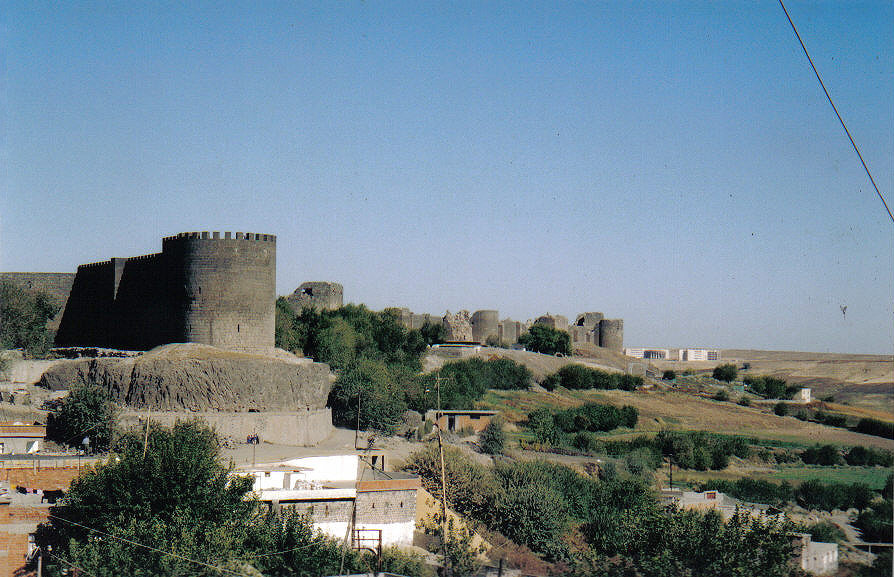
The walls of Amida, besieged 359 AD

- Siege of Singara (344) – Perso-Roman wars of 337–361
- Siege of Nisibis (347) – Perso-Roman wars of 337–361
- Siege of Nisibis (350) – Perso-Roman wars of 337–361
- Siege of Autun (356)
- Siege of Senonae (356)
- Siege of Amida (359) – Perso-Roman wars of 337–361
- Siege of Singara (360) – Perso-Roman wars of 337–361
- Siege of Aquileia (361)
- Siege of Pirisabora (363) – Julian's Persian War
- Siege of Maiozamalcha (363) – Julian's Persian War
- Siege of Adrianople (378) – Gothic War (376–382)

==== 5th century ====
- Siege of Asti (402)
- Siege of Florence (405)
- Siege of Rome (408–410)
- Siege of Arles (411)
- Siege of Valence (411)
- Siege of Bazas (413)
- Sack of Trier (413)
- Siege of Massilia (413)
- Siege of Theodosiopolis (421) – Roman–Sasanian War (421–422)
- Siege of Arles (425)
- Siege of Hippo Regius (430–431)
- Siege of Narbonne (436–437)
- Siege of Noviodunum (437)
- Siege of Viminacium (441) by Attila
- Siege of Naissus (442) by Attila
- Siege of Sirmium (442) by Attila
- Siege of Ratiaria (447) by Attila
- Siege of Metz (451) by Attila
- Siege of Aurelianum (451) by Attila
- Siege of Aquileia (452) by Attila
- Siege of Castrum Cainonense (463)
- Siege of Singidunum (472)
- Siege of Taragona (472)
- Siege of Rome (472) by Ricimer
- Siege of Papyrius (484–488)
- Siege of Ravenna (490–493) – Ostrogothic conquest of Italy
- Siege of Nisibis (498)
- Siege of Avignon (500)
- Siege of Vienne (500)

== Medieval ==
=== 6th century ===
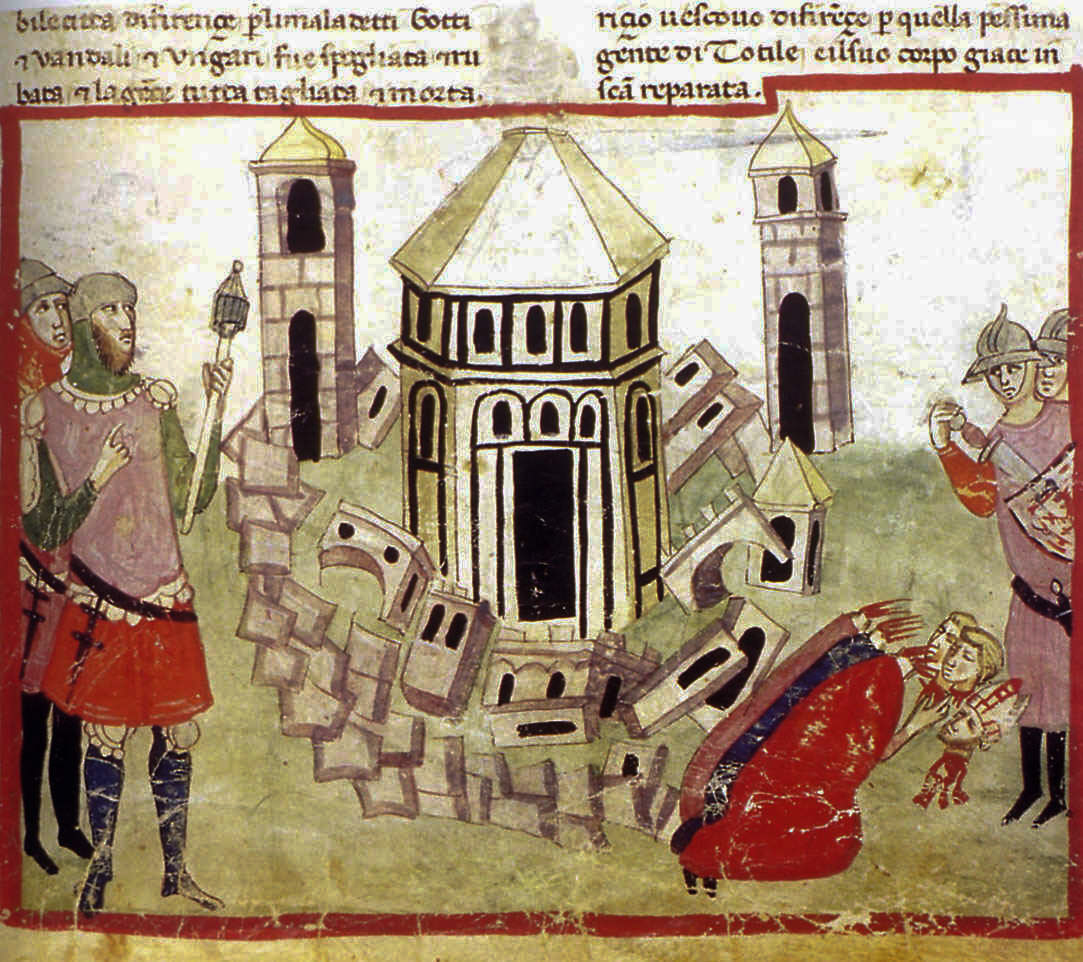
Totila razes the walls of Florence: 14th century illustration from Giovanni Villani's Nuova Cronica

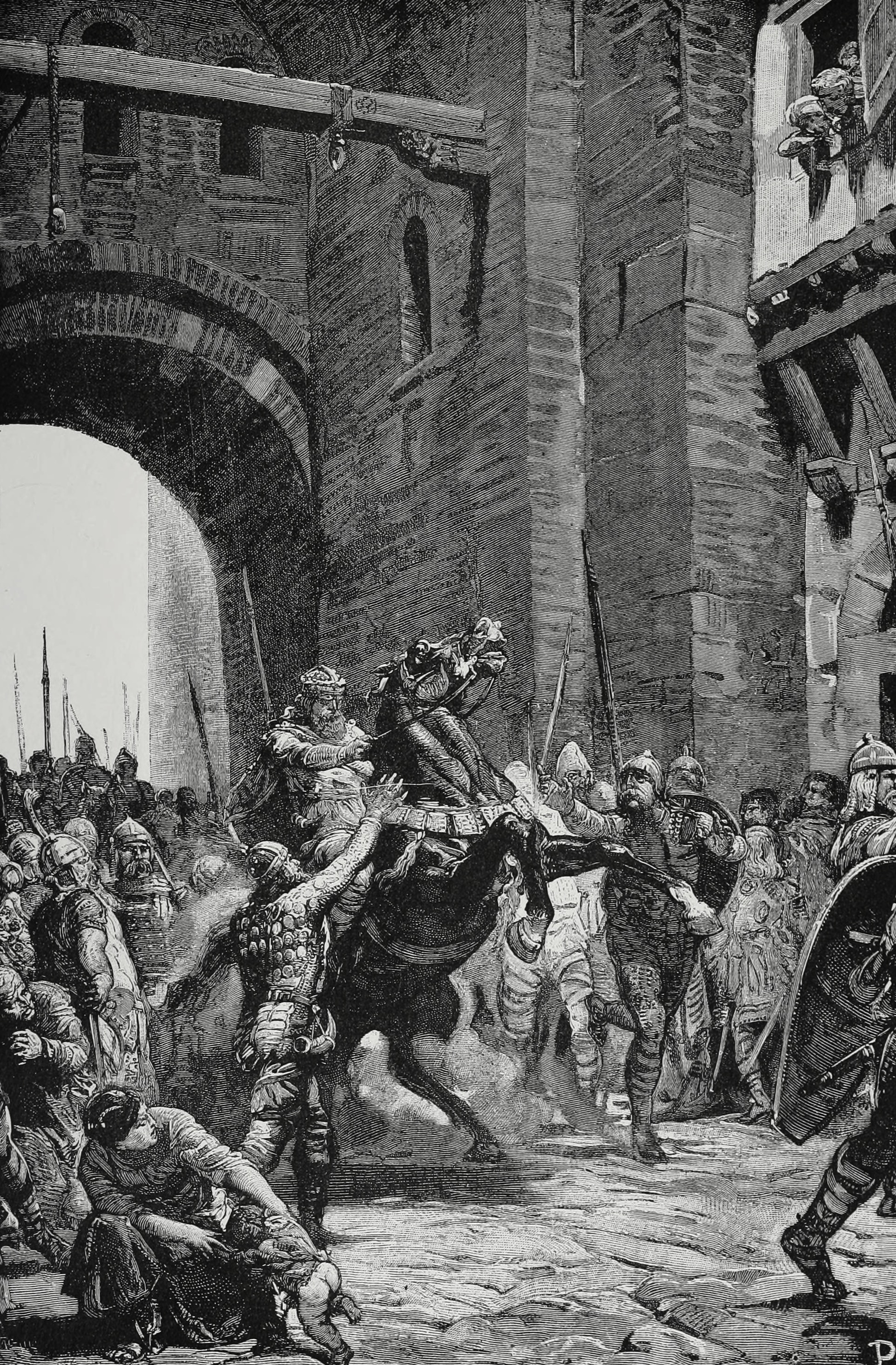
The capture of Pavia by the Lombard King, Alboin: Siege of Pavia, 572 AD

- Siege of Theodosiopolis (502) – Anastasian War
- Siege of Martyropolis (502) – Anastasian War
- Siege of Amida (502–503) – Anastasian War
- Siege of Constantina (502) – Anastasian War
- Siege of Harran (502) – Anastasian War
- Siege of Edessa (502) – Anastasian War
- Second siege of Theodosiopolis (502) – Anastasian War
- Siege of Amida (503) – Anastasian War
- Siege of Ashparin (503) – Anastasian War
- Siege of Kallinikos (503) – Anastasian War
- Siege of Amida (504) – Anastasian War
- Siege of Arles (507–508)
- Siege of Clermont (524)
- Siege of Vollore (524)
- Siege of Chastel-Marlhac (524)
- Siege of Vitry (524)
- Siege of Martyropolis (531) – Iberian War
- Siege of Autun (534)
- Siege of Panormus (535) – Gothic War (535–554)
- Siege of Naples (536) – Gothic War (535–554)
- Siege of Salona (537) – Gothic War (535–554)
- Siege of Rome (537–538) – Gothic War (535–554)
- Siege of Ariminum (538) – Gothic War (535–554)
- Siege of Mediolanum (538–539) – Gothic War (535–554)
- Siege of Ancona (538) – Gothic War (535–554)
- Siege of Urbino (538) – Gothic War (535–554)
- Siege of Cesena (538) – Gothic War (535–554)
- Siege of Orvieto (538) – Gothic War (535–554)
- Siege of Faesulae (539) – Gothic War (535–554)
- Siege of Auximum (539) – Gothic War (535–554)
- Siege of Ravenna (539–540) – Gothic War (535–554)
- Siege of Kassandria (539)
- Siege of Sura (540) – Lazic War
- Siege of Beroea (540) – Lazic War
- Siege of Antioch (540) – Lazic War
- Siege of Dara (540) – Lazic War
- Siege of Petra (541) – Lazic War
- Siege of Sisauranon (541) – Lazic War
- Siege of Verona (541) – Gothic War (535–554)
- Siege of Florence (542) – Gothic War (535–554)
- Siege of Naples (542–543) – Gothic War (535–554)
- Siege of Sergiopolis (542) – Lazic War
- Siege of Edessa (544) – Lazic War
- Siege of Otranto (544) – Gothic War (535–554)
- Siege of Auximum (544) – Gothic War (535–554)
- Siege of Pesaro (544) – Gothic War (535–554)
- Siege of Fermo (544) – Gothic War (535–554)
- Siege of Ascoli (544) – Gothic War (535–554)
- Siege of Spoleto (545) – Gothic War (535–554)
- Siege of Assisi (545) – Gothic War (535–554)
- Siege of Perugia (545) – Gothic War (535–554)
- Siege of Piacenza (545) – Gothic War (535–554)
- Siege of Rome (546–547) – Gothic War (535–554)
- Siege of Septem (547)
- Siege of Rossano (548) – Gothic War (535–554)
- Siege of Petra (549) – Lazic War
- Siege of Rome (549–550) – Gothic War (535–554)
- Siege of Centumcellae (549) – Gothic War (535–554)
- Siege of Reggio (549) – Gothic War (535–554)
- Siege of Messina (549) – Gothic War (535–554)
- Siege of Topeiros (549)
- Siege of the Abasgian fortress (549)
- Siege of Petra (550–551) – Lazic War
- Siege of Archaeopolis (551) – Lazic War
- Siege of Ancona (551) – Gothic War (535–554)
- Siege of the Sicilian forts (551) – Gothic War (535–554)
- Siege of Caranalis (551) – Gothic War (535–554)
- Siege of Crotone (551) – Gothic War (535–554)
- Siege of Rome (552) – Gothic War (535–554)
- Siege of Centumcellae (552–553) – Gothic War (535–554)
- Siege of Cumae (552) – Gothic War (535–554)
- Siege of Lucca (553) – Gothic War (535–554)
- Siege of Parma (553) – Gothic War (535–554)
- Siege of Conza (553–554) – Gothic War (535–554)
- Siege of Onoguris (555) – Lazic War
- Siege of Chalon-sur-Saône (555)
- Siege of Phasis (555–556) – Lazic War
- Siege of Tzacher (557) – Lazic War
- Siege of Arles (567)
- Siege of Sirmium (568) – Avar–Byzantine wars
- Siege of Pavia (569–572) – Byzantine–Lombard wars
- Siege of Thebothon (573) – Byzantine–Sasanian War of 572–591
- Siege of Nisibis (573) – Byzantine–Sasanian War of 572–591
- Siege of Dara (573) – Byzantine–Sasanian War of 572–591
- Siege of Apathea (573) – Byzantine–Sasanian War of 572–591
- Siege of Valence (574)
- Siege of Grenoble (574)
- Siege of Tournai (575)
- Siege of Amida (578) – Byzantine–Sasanian War of 572–591
- Siege of Aphumon (578) – Byzantine–Sasanian War of 572–591
- Siege of Chlomaron (578) – Byzantine–Sasanian War of 572–591
- Siege of Sirmium (580–582) – Avar–Byzantine wars
- Siege of Uzès (581)
- Siege of Bourges (583)
- Siege of Avignon (583)
- Siege of Singidunum (583)
- Siege of Anchialos (583)
- Siege of Seville (583)
- Siege of Aphumon (583)
- Siege of Akbas (583)
- Siege of Brescello (584) – Byzantine–Lombard wars
- Siege of Monocarton (585) – Byzantine–Sasanian War of 572–591
- Siege of Convenae (585)
- Siege of Cabaret (585)
- Siege of Ugernum (585)
- Siege of Appiaria (586) – Avar–Byzantine wars
- Siege of Thessalonica (586 or 597) – attack on the city by Slavs and Avars
- Siege of Comacina (587) – Byzantine–Lombard wars
- Siege of Beroe (587) – Avar–Byzantine wars
- Siege of Diocletianopolis (587) – Avar–Byzantine wars
- Siege of Philippopolis (587) – Avar–Byzantine wars
- Siege of Adrianople (587) – Avar–Byzantine wars
- Siege of Persian fort in Arzanene (587) – Byzantine–Sasanian War of 572–591
- Siege of Beïudaes (587) – Byzantine–Sasanian War of 572–591
- Siege of Singidunum (588) – Avar–Byzantine wars
- Siege of Anchialos (588) – Avar–Byzantine wars
- Siege of Drizipera (588) – Avar–Byzantine wars
- Siege of Tzurullon (588) – Avar–Byzantine wars
- Siege of Philippopolis (589) – Byzantine–Sasanian War of 572–591
- Siege of Akbas (590) – Byzantine–Sasanian War of 572–591
- Siege of Treviso (591)
- Siege of Perugia (593) – Byzantine–Lombard wars
- Siege of Singidunum (595) – Avar–Byzantine wars

=== 7th century ===
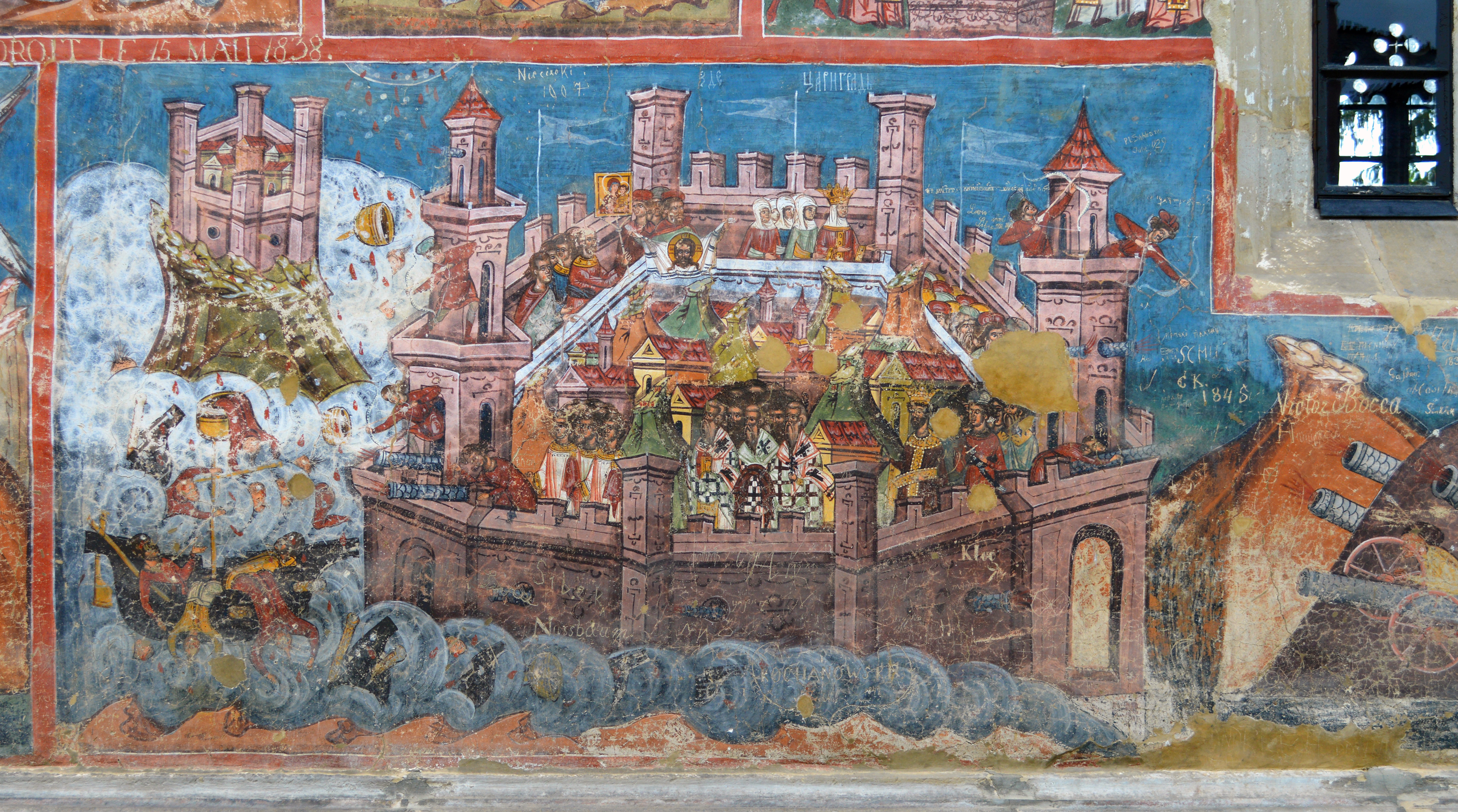
The Siege of Constantinople by the combined Sassanid, Avar, and Slavic forces in 626. A 1537 depiction on the murals of the Moldovița Monastery, Romania

- Siege of Padua (601)
- Siege of Monselice (602)
- Siege of Cremona (603) – Byzantine–Lombard wars
- Siege of Mantua (603) – Byzantine–Lombard wars
- Siege of Edessa (603) – Byzantine–Sasanian War of 602–628
- Siege of Dara (603) – Byzantine–Sasanian War of 602–628
- Siege of Thessalonica (604)
- Siege of Orléans (604)
- Siege of Mardin (606–608) – Byzantine–Sasanian War of 602–628
- Siege of Kerteba (608) – Byzantine–Sasanian War of 602–628
- Siege of San (608) – Byzantine–Sasanian War of 602–628
- Siege of Basta (608) – Byzantine–Sasanian War of 602–628
- Siege of Balqa (608) – Byzantine–Sasanian War of 602–628
- Siege of Sanhur (608) – Byzantine–Sasanian War of 602–628
- Siege of Demqaruni (609) – Byzantine–Sasanian War of 602–628
- Siege of Theodisiopolis (609) – Byzantine–Sasanian War of 602–628
- Siege of Caesarea (611) – Byzantine–Sasanian War of 602–628
- Siege of Caesarea Maritima (614) by the Persians
- Siege of Jerusalem (614) by the Persians under Shahrbaraz
- Siege of Chalcedon (615) – Byzantine–Sasanian War of 602–628
- Siege of Thessalonica (615) – attack on the city by Slavs
- Siege of Thessalonica (617) – attack on the city by Slavs and Avars
- Siege of Alexandria (619) – Byzantine–Sasanian War of 602–628
- Siege of Ancyra (622) – Byzantine–Sasanian War of 602–628
- Siege of Constantinople (626) by Avars and Sassanid Persians in 626
- Battle of the Trench (627)
- Siege of Derbent (627) during the Third Perso-Turkic War
- Siege of Tbilisi (628) during the Third Perso-Turkic War
- Siege of Ctesiphon (629) – Sasanian civil war of 628-632
- Siege of Edessa (630)
- Siege of Exeter (c.630) – almost certainly fictional
- Siege of Ta'if (630)
- Siege of Wogastisburg (631)
- Siege of Bosra (634) – Muslim conquest of the Levant
- Siege of Damascus (634) – Muslim conquest of the Levant
- Siege of Emesa (635) – Muslim conquest of the Levant
- Siege of Laodicea (636) – Muslim conquest of the Levant
- Siege of Jerusalem (636–637) – Muslim conquest of the Levant
- Siege of Ctesiphon (637) – Muslim conquest of Persia
- Siege of Aleppo (637) – Muslim conquest of the Levant
- Siege of Germanicia (638) – Muslim conquest of the Levant
- Siege of Caesarea Maritima (640) – Muslim conquest of the Levant
- Siege of Babylon Fortress (640) – Muslim conquest of Egypt
- Siege of Alexandria (641) – Muslim conquest of Egypt
- Siege of Shushtar (641–642) – Muslim conquest of Persia
- Siege of Gundishapur (642) – Muslim conquest of Persia
- Siege of Tripoli (644) – Arab–Byzantine wars
- Siege of Ansi (645) – Goguryeo–Tang War
- Siege of Constantia (649) – Arab–Byzantine wars
- Siege of Arwad (649) – Arab–Byzantine wars
- Siege of Lapethus (650) – Arab–Byzantine wars
- Siege of Herat (652) – Muslim conquest of Persia
- Siege of Zaragoza (653)
- Siege of Theodosiopolis (655) – Arab–Byzantine wars
- Siege of Lyons (662)
- Siege of Lucera (663) – Byzantine–Lombard wars
- Siege of Beneventum (663) – Byzantine–Lombard wars
- Siege of SYLWS (664) – Arab–Byzantine wars
- Siege of Amorium (666) – Arab–Byzantine wars
- Siege of Clausurae (673)
- Siege of Narbonne (673)
- Siege of Maguelone (673)
- Siege of Nîmes (673)
- First Arab siege of Constantinople in 674–678
- Siege of Thessalonica (676–678) – attack on the city by Slavs
- Siege of Autun (679)
- Siege of Trent (680) by Perctarit
- Siege of Bulgar fortifications (680) – Byzantine–Bulgarian wars
- Siege of Mecca (683) by the Umayyads during the Second Fitna
- Siege of Damascus (690) by the Umayyads during the Second Fitna
- Siege of Mecca (692) by the Umayyads during the Second Fitna
- Siege of Carthage (698) – Muslim conquest of the Maghreb

=== 8th century ===
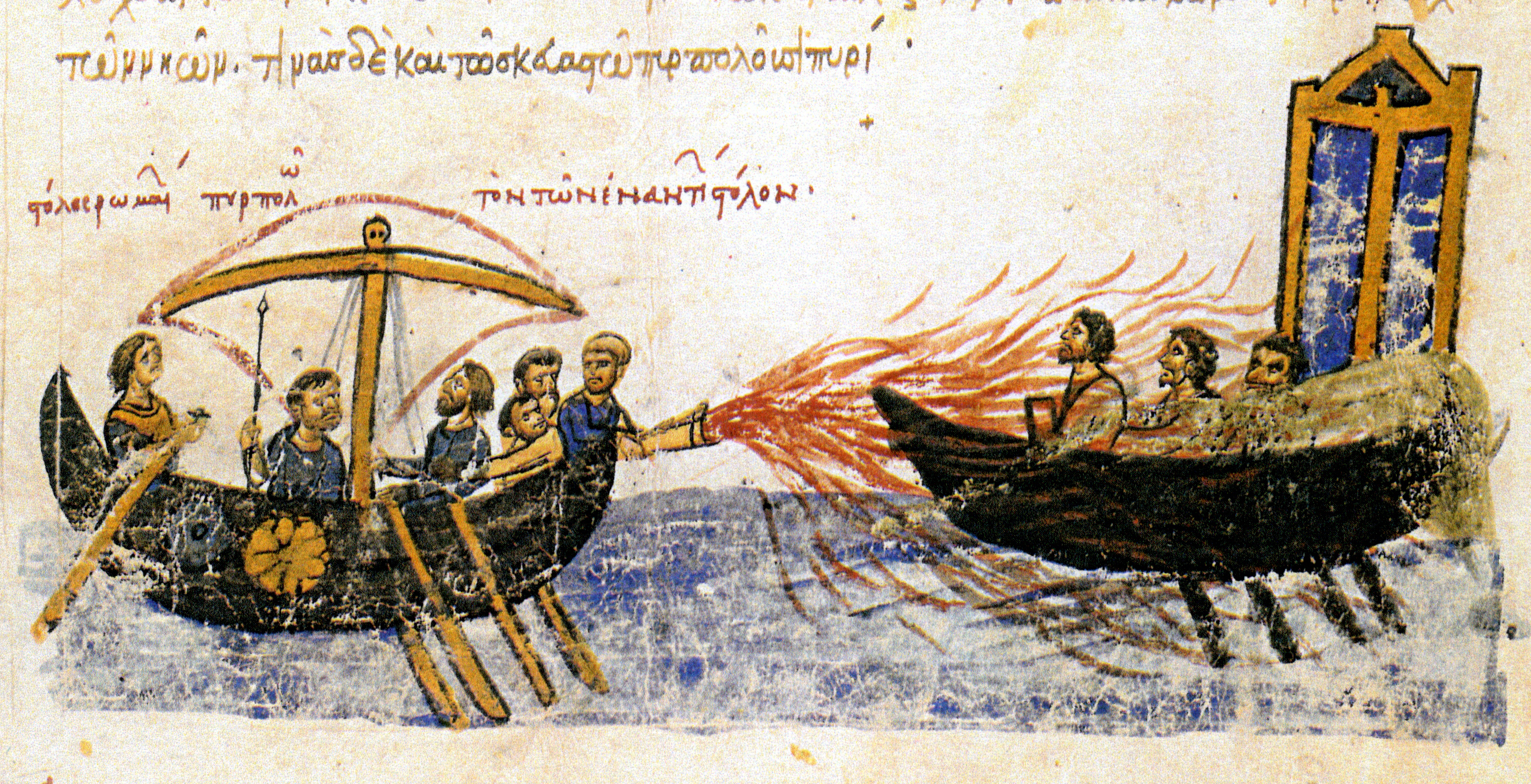
Greek fire, used by the Byzantine navy to destroy the Arab fleets at the 717–718 Siege of Constantinople. Illustration from a 12th-century illuminated manuscript (Madrid Skylitzes)

- Siege of Bergamo (701)
- Siege of Taranton (702) – Arab–Byzantine Wars
- Siege of Tyana (707–708) by the Umayyads
- Siege of Anchialus (708) – Byzantine-Bulgarian Wars
- Siege of Turanda (712) – Arab–Byzantine Wars
- Siege of Constantinople (717–718) by the Umayyads
- Siege of Toulouse (721) – Umayyad invasion of Gaul
- Siege of Angers (722)
- Siege of Nicaea (727) by the Umayyads
- Siege of Kamarja (729) by the Turgesh
- Siege of Bordeaux (732) – Umayyad invasion of Gaul
- Siege of Avignon (737) – Umayyad invasion of Gaul
- Siege of Narbonne (737) – Umayyad invasion of Gaul
- Siege of Nîmes (737) – Umayyad invasion of Gaul
- Siege of Synnada (740) – Arab–Byzantine Wars
- Siege of Laon (741)
- Siege of Loches (742)
- Siege of Emesa (745) – Third Fitna
- Siege of Wasit (749–750) – Abbasid Revolution
- Siege of Melitene (750)
- Siege of Narbonne (752–59) – Umayyad invasion of Gaul
- Siege of Pavia (755)
- Siege of Rome (756)
- Siege of Pavia (756)
- Siege of Suiyang (757) – known because of acts of cannibalism.
- Siege of Sythen (758)
- Siege of Bourbon (761) – Aquitanian War
- Siege of Clermont (761) – Aquitanian War
- Siege of Chantelle (761) – Aquitanian War
- Siege of Bourges (762) – Aquitanian War
- Siege of Thouars (762) – Aquitanian War
- Siege of Kamacha (766) – Arab–Byzantine Wars
- Siege of Toulouse (767) – Aquitanian War
- Siege of Syke (771) – Arab–Byzantine Wars

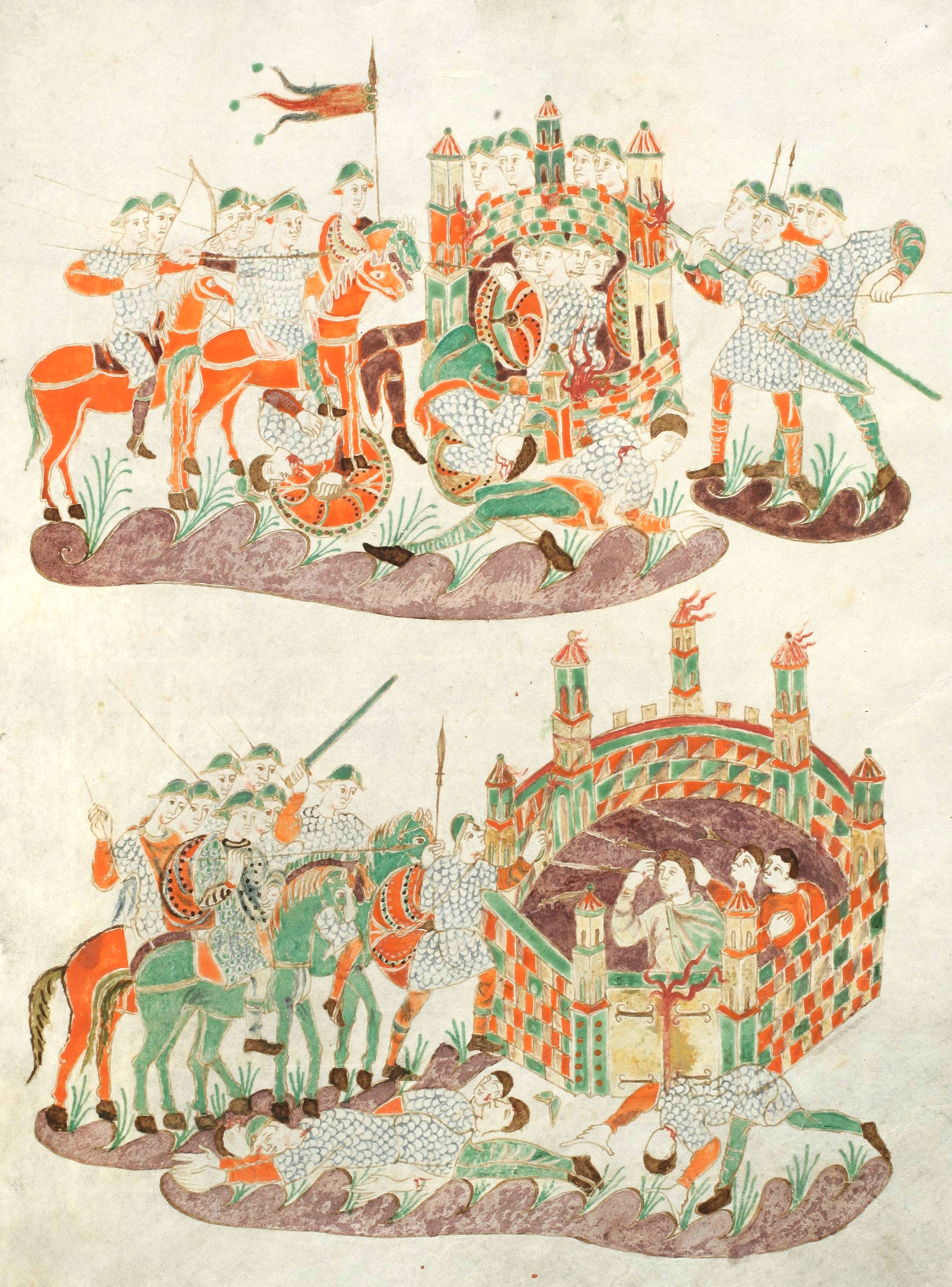
Carolingian-era siege warfare. Illustration of Psalm 60 from the Golden Psalter of St. Gallen, c. 890.

- Siege of Pavia (773–774) – Lombard kingdom conquered by Charlemagne
- Siege of Syburg (775) – Saxon Wars
- Siege of Syburg (776) – Saxon Wars
- Siege of Barbād (776)
- Siege of Zaragoza (778) by Charlemagne
- Siege of Germanikeia (778) – Arab–Byzantine Wars
- Siege of Semaluos (780) – Arab–Byzantine Wars
- Siege of Nakoleia (782) – Arab–Byzantine Wars
- Siege of Huesca (797)
- Siege of Trsat (799)
- Siege of Barcelona (800–801) by Louis the Pious

=== 9th century ===
- Siege of Lucera (802)
- Siege of Canburg (805)
- Siege of Patras (805 or 807) by the Slavs of the Peloponnese
- Siege of Melitene (805) – Arab–Byzantine Wars
- Siege of Heraclea (806) – Arab–Byzantine Wars
- Siege of Tortosa (809) by Louis the Pious
- Siege of Serdica (809) – Byzantine–Bulgarian wars
- Siege of Venice (810)
- Siege of Debeltos (812) – Byzantine–Bulgarian wars
- Siege of Baghdad (812–813) – Fourth Fitna
- Siege of Mesembria (812) – Byzantine–Bulgarian wars
- Siege of Adrianople (813) – Byzantine–Bulgarian wars
- Siege of Constantinople (821–822)
- Siege of Arkadiopolis (823)
- Siege of Kaysum (824) – fourth Fitna
- Siege of Syracuse (827–828) – Muslim conquest of Sicily
- Siege and sack of Amorium (838) – Arab–Byzantine Wars
- Siege of Paris (845) – Viking expansion
- Siege of Rome (846)
- Siege of Marand (848)
- Capture of Faruriyyah (862) – Arab–Byzantine Wars
- Siege of Dowina (864)
- Siege of Baghdad (865) – Abbasid civil war (865–866)
- Siege of Ragusa (866–868) – Arab–Byzantine Wars
- Siege of Syracuse (868) – Muslim conquest of Sicily
- Siege of Dumbarton (870) – Viking expansion

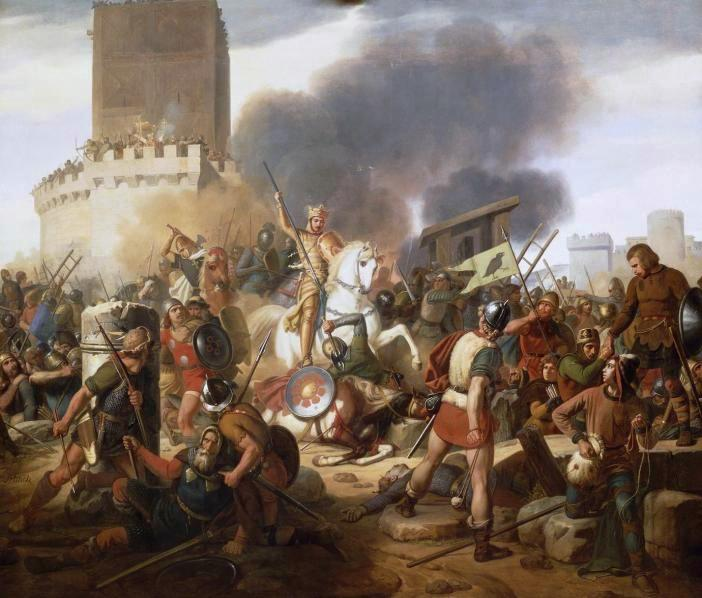
Count Odo defends Paris against the Normans (885-886) by Jean-Victor Schnetz. Oil on canvas (1834–1836)

- Siege of Melite (870) – Muslim conquest of Sicily
- Siege of Bari (870–871) – Frankish conquest of the Emirate of Bari
- Siege of Salerno (871–872)
- Siege of Syracuse (877–878) – Muslim conquest of Sicily
- Siege of al-Mukhtarah (881) – Zanj Rebellion
- Siege of Asselt (882) – Viking expansion
- Siege of Euripos (883) – Arab–Byzantine Wars
- Siege of Rochester (885)
- Siege of Paris (885–886) – Viking expansion
- Siege of Buttington (893) – Viking expansion
- Siege of Bergamo (894)
- Siege of Rome (896)
- Siege of Spoleto (896)
- Siege of Amida (899)

=== 10th century ===
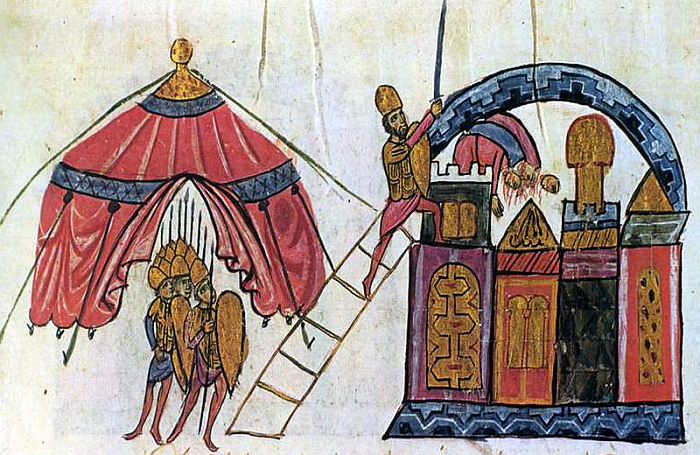
Fall of Antioch to the Byzantines under Michael Bourtzes on 28 October 969. Chronicle of John Skylitzes, 12th century illustration.

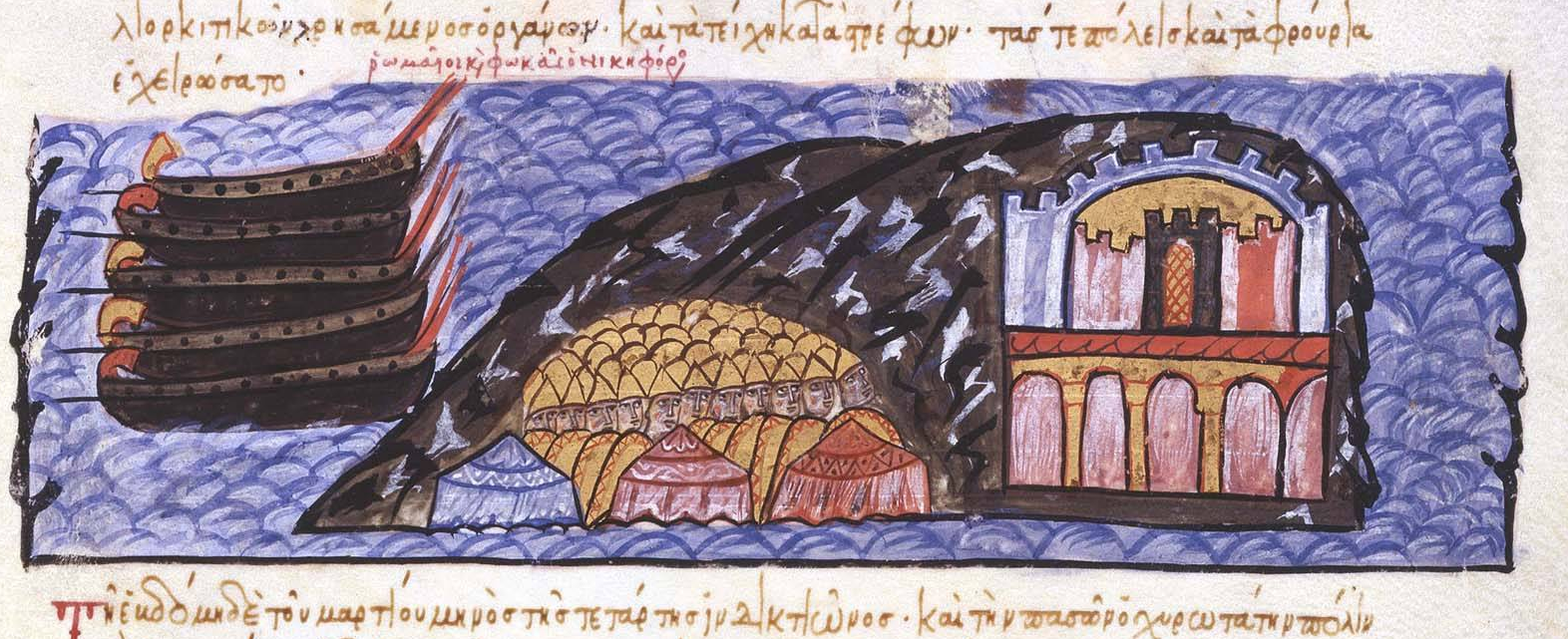
Depiction of the siege of Chandax (960-961) from the history of John Skylitzes

- Siege of Taormina (902) by the Aghlabids
- Siege of Thessalonica (904) by Saracen corsairs
- Siege of Chartres (911) – Viking expansion
- Siege of Queli (914)
- Siege of Regensburg (921)
- Siege of Rheims (922)
- Siege of Chièvrement (922)
- Siege of Saverne (923)
- Siege of Metz (923)
- Siege of Adrianople (923) – Byzantine–Bulgarian wars
- Siege of Zülpich (925)
- Siege of Durofostum (928)
- Siege of Brandenburg (929)
- Siege of Gana (929)
- Siege of Lebusa (929)
- Siege of Lenzen (929)
- Siege of Douai (930)
- Siege of Péronne (932)
- Siege of Saint-Quentin (935)
- Siege of Pierrepont (938)
- Siege of Laer (939)
- Siege of Eresburg (939)
- Siege of Chièvrement (939)
- Siege of Breisach (939)
- Siege of Montreuil (939)
- Siege of Laon (946)
- Siege of Rheims (946)
- Siege of Aquileia (947)
- Siege of Mouzon (948)
- Siege of Montaigu (948)
- Siege of Laon (949)
- Siege of Senlis (949)
- Siege of Nimburg (950)
- Siege of Pavia (951)
- Siege of Mareuil (952)
- Siege of Breisach (953)
- Siege of Mainz (953)
- Siege of Regensburg (953)
- Siege of Roßtal (954)
- Siege of Regensburg (954)
- Siege of Suithleiscranne (955)
- Siege of Augsburg (955)
- Siege of Pavia (956)
- Siege of Amida (960) – Arab–Byzantine wars
- Siege of Namur (960)
- Siege of Chièvrement (960)
- Siege of Troyes (960)
- Siege of Chandax (960–961) – Arab–Byzantine wars
- Siege of Montefeltro (961)
- Siege of Taormina (962) – Muslim conquest of Sicily
- Siege of Monte Sancti Leonis (962–963)
- Siege of Verim (963)
- Siege of Rometta (963–965) – Muslim conquest of Sicily
- Siege of Rome (964)
- Siege of Tarsus (965) – Byzantine conquest of Cilicia
- Siege of Mopsuestia (965) – Byzantine conquest of Cilicia
- Siege of Bari (968)
- Siege of Kiev (968)
- Siege of Manzikert (968) – Arab–Byzantine wars
- Siege of Antioch (968–969) – Arab–Byzantine wars
- Siege of Capua (969)
- Siege of Avellino (969)
- Siege of Antioch (971) – Arab–Byzantine wars
- Siege of Dorostolon (971) by the Byzantines
- Siege of Nisibis (972) – Arab–Byzantine wars
- Siege of Baalbek (975) – Syrian campaigns of John Tzimiskes
- Siege of Beirut (975) – Syrian campaigns of John Tzimiskes
- Siege of Byblos (975) – Syrian campaigns of John Tzimiskes
- Siege of Tripoli (975) – Syrian campaigns of John Tzimiskes
- Siege of Regensburg (976)
- Siege of Passau (977)
- Siege of Paris (978)
- Siege of Taranto (982)
- Siege of Verdun (984)
- Siege of Apameia (985) – Arab–Byzantine wars
- Siege of Marçon (987)
- Siege of Abydos (989)
- Siege of Nantes (992)
- Siege of Brandenburg (992)
- Siege of Langeais (994)
- Siege of Aleppo (994–995) – Arab–Byzantine wars
- Siege of Tripoli (995) – Arab–Byzantine wars
- Siege of Langeais (995–996)
- Siege of Poitiers (995)
- Siege of Tours (996)
- Siege of Châteauneuf (996)
- Revolt of Tyre (996–998)
- Siege of Bellac (997)
- Siege of Rochemeaux (997)
- Siege of Castel Sant'Angelo (998)
- Siege of Zadar (998) by the emperor Samuil of Bulgaria
- Siege of Lastovo (1000) – Croatian–Venetian wars

=== 11th century ===
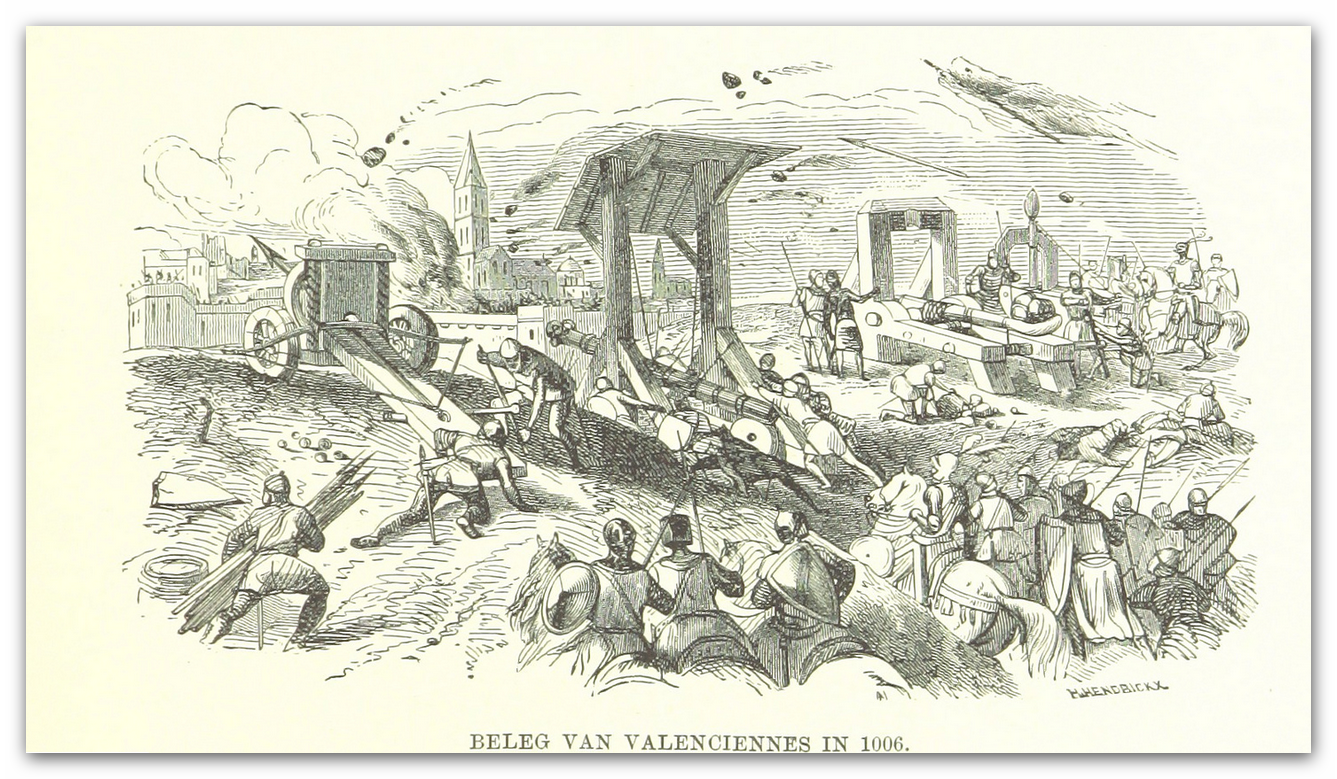
Siege of Valenciennes in 1006, illustration (1885).

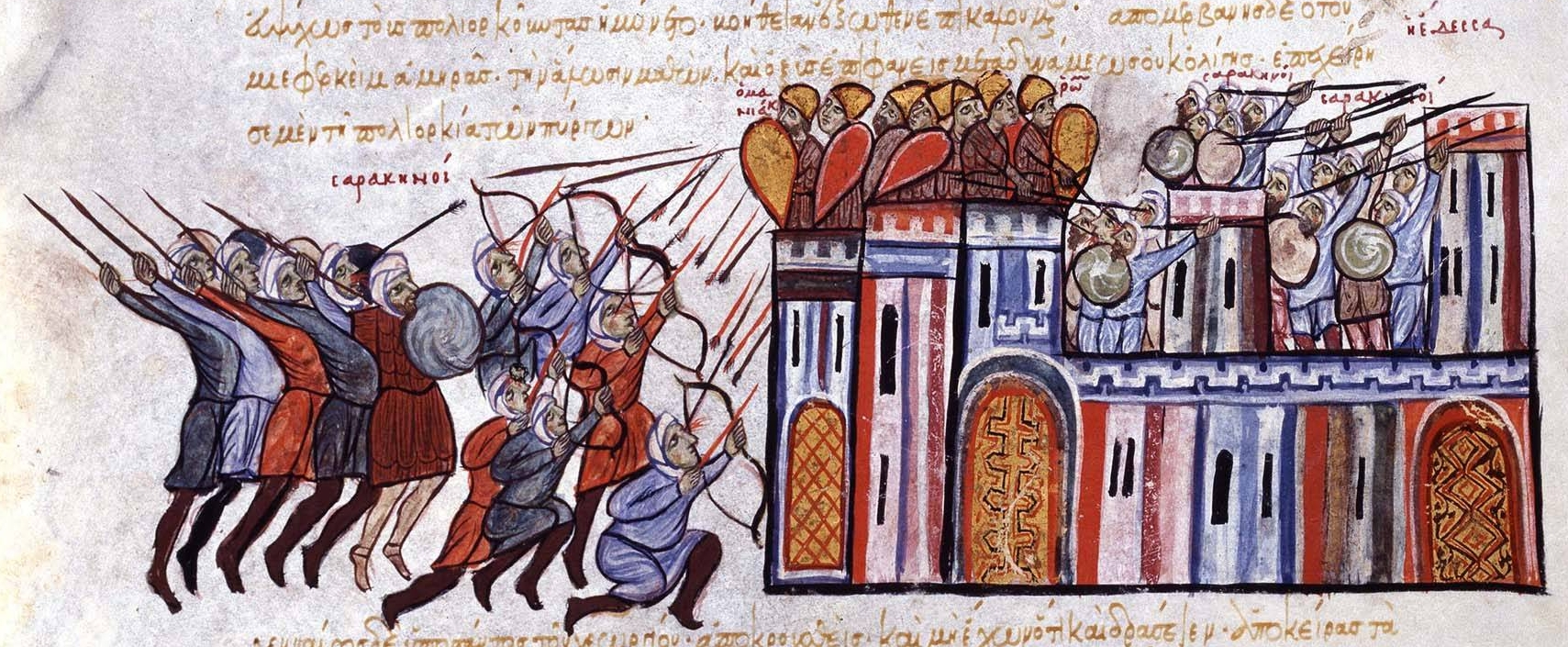
The Byzantine army of George Maniakes defends the towers of Edessa against an Arab counterattack (1031). Illustration from the chronicle of John Skylitzes

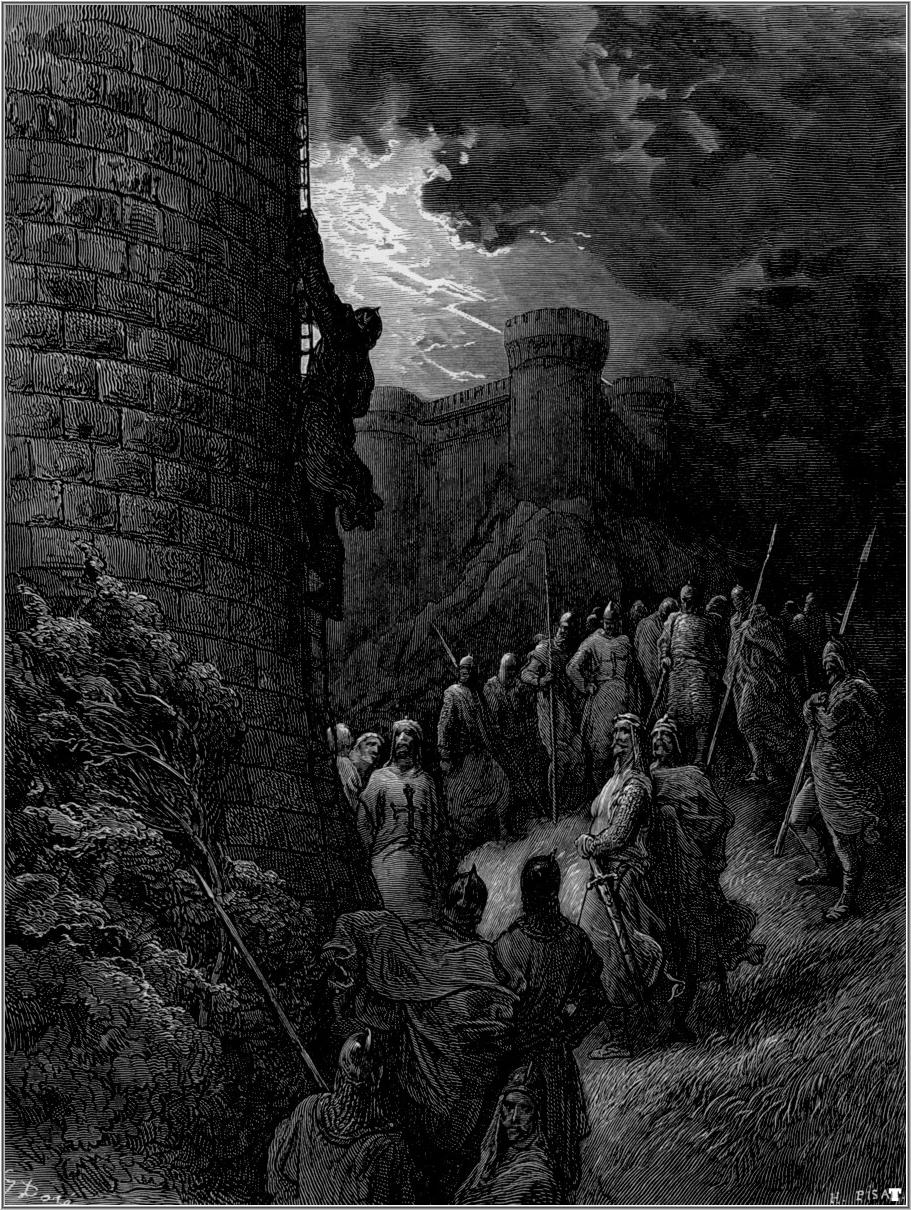
Prince Bohemond of Taranto scales the walls of Antioch in 1098. 19th century engraving by Gustave Doré.

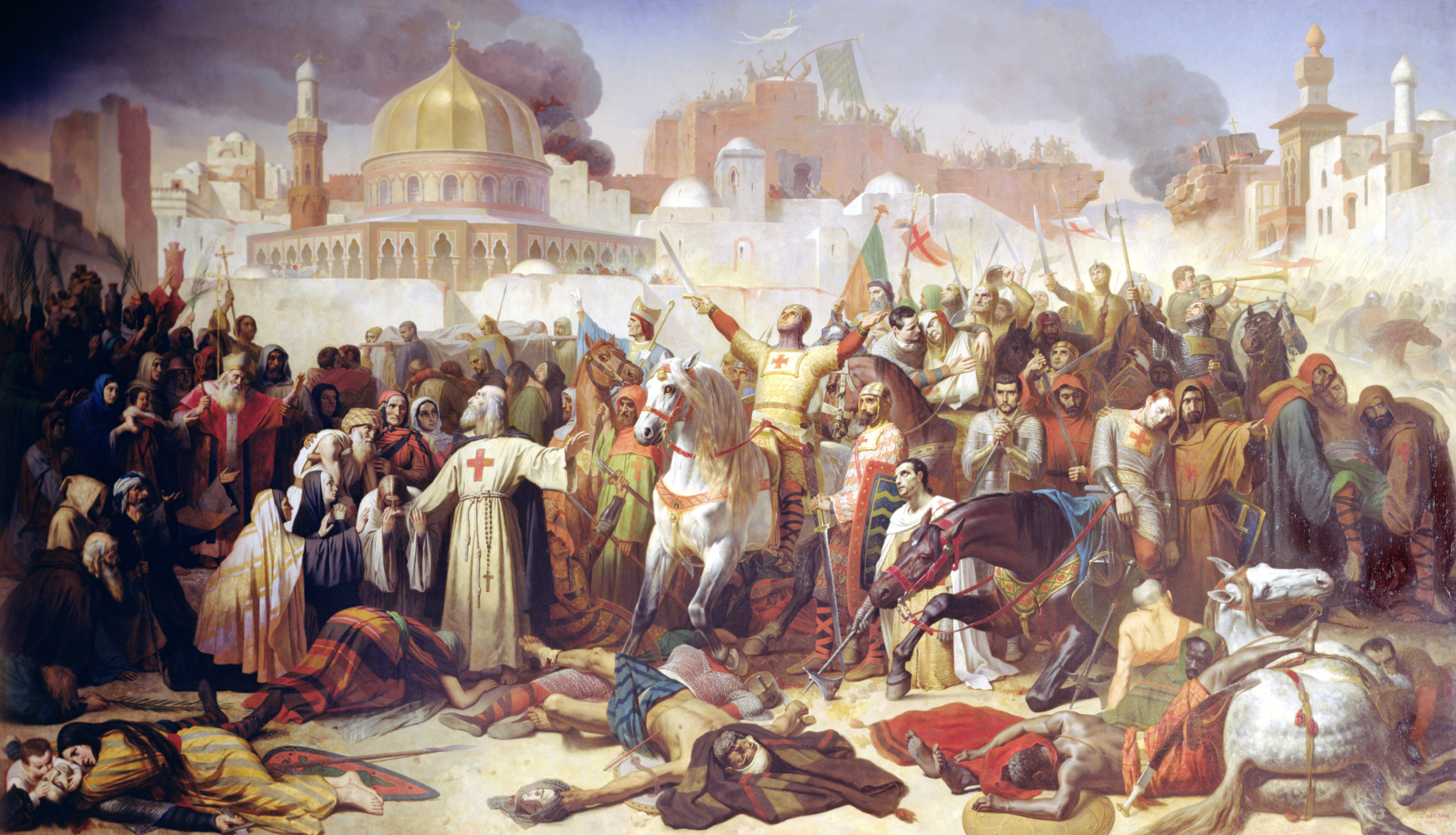
Taking of Jerusalem by the Crusaders, 15 July 1099 by Émile Signol. Oil on canvas, 1850.

- Siege of Rome (1001) – Byzantine conquest of Bulgaria
- Siege of Voden (1001)
- Siege of Taq (1002)
- Siege of Vidin (1002) – Byzantine conquest of Bulgaria
- Siege of Pernik (1003) – Byzantine conquest of Bulgaria
- Siege of Auxerre (1003)
- Siege of Ammerthal (1003)
- Siege of Creussen (1003)
- Siege of Pavia (1004)
- Siege of Bhatiya (1004-5)
- Siege of Multan (1005–1006)
- Siege of Valenciennes (1006–1007)
- Siege of Nairn (1009)
- Siege of Bari (1010–1011)
- Siege of Montbazon (1011)
- Siege of Lebusa (1012)
- Siege of Makrievo (1014) – Byzantine conquest of Bulgaria
- Siege of Montbazon (1015)
- Siege of Pernik (1016) – Byzantine conquest of Bulgaria
- Siege of Uflach (1016)
- Siege of Tours (1016)
- Siege of Glogau (1017)
- Siege of Niemcza (1017)
- Siege of Montboyau (1021)
- Siege of Capua (1024–1026)
- Siege of Pavia (1026)
- Siege of Montboyau (1026)
- Siege of Saumur (1026)
- Siege of Somnath (1026)
- Siege of Amboise (1027)
- Siege of Le Lude (1027)
- Siege of Saumur (1027)
- Siege of Bautzen (1029)
- Siege of Azaz (1030)
- Siege of Edessa (1031)
- Siege of Bautzen (1031)
- Siege of Sens (1032)
- Siege of Sarsawa (1033)
- Siege of Kiev (1036)
- Siege of Milan (1037) by the emperor Conrad II
- Siege of Hansi (1037–1038)
- Siege of Langeais (1038)
- Siege of Messina (1038)
- Siege of Germond (1039)
- Siege of Montgomery (1039)
- Siege of Zaranj (1040)
- Siege of Syracuse (1040)
- Siege of Tours (1042–1043)
- Siege of Bari (1043) – Norman conquest of Southern Italy
- Siege of Isfahan (1050–1051)
- Siege of Taq (1051)
- Siege of Alençon (1051)
- Siege of Domfront (1051)
- Siege of Arques (1052)
- Siege of Pozsony (1052) by Henrik III., Holy Roman Emperor
- Siege of Medina (1053–54) by the Byzantines
- Siege of Benevento (1054) – Norman conquest of Southern Italy
- Siege of Manzikert (1054) – Byzantine–Seljuq wars
- Siege of Reggio (1057) – Norman conquest of Southern Italy
- Siege of Capua (1057–1058) – Norman conquest of Southern Italy
- Siege of Thimert (1058–1060)
- Siege of Aquino (1058) – Norman conquest of Southern Italy
- Siege of Galeria (1059)
- Siege of Cariati (1059) – Byzantine–Norman wars
- Siege of Reggio (1059–1060) – Byzantine–Norman wars
- Siege of Melfi (1061) – Byzantine–Norman wars
- Siege of Messina (1061) – Norman conquest of Southern Italy
- Siege of Enna (1061) – Norman conquest of Southern Italy
- Siege of Capua (1062) – Norman conquest of Southern Italy
- Siege of Kuriyagawa (1062) – Former Nine Years' War
- Siege of Troina (1062–1063) – Norman conquest of Southern Italy
- Siege of Cerami (1063) – Norman conquest of Southern Italy
- Siege of Graus (1063)
- Siege of Ani (1064) – Seljuq conquest of Byzantine Armenia
- Siege of Barbastro (1064) – Reconquista
- Siege of Palermo (1064) – Norman conquest of Southern Italy
- Siege of Valencia (1065), a siege during the reign of Ferdinand I of León and Castile
- Siege of Exeter (1068)
- Siege of Bari (1068–1071) – Norman conquest of Southern Italy
- Siege of Iconium (1069) – Byzantine–Seljuq wars
- Siege of Brindisi (1070) – Norman conquest of Southern Italy
- Siege of Palermo (1071–1072) – Norman conquest of Southern Italy
- Siege of Zamora (1072)
- Siege of Lüneburg (1072) – Saxon Rebellion
- Siege of Trani (1073) – Norman conquest of Southern Italy
- Siege of Amalfi (1073) – Norman conquest of Southern Italy
- Siege of Heimenburg (1073) – Saxon Rebellion
- Siege of Asenburg (1073) – Saxon Rebellion
- Siege of Harzburg (1073) – Saxon Rebellion
- Siege of Wiganstein (1073) – Saxon Rebellion
- Siege of Moseburg (1073) – Saxon Rebellion
- Siege of Sassenstein (1073) – Saxon Rebellion
- Siege of Spatenburg (1074) – Saxon Rebellion
- Siege of Vokenroht (1074) – Saxon Rebellion
- Siege of Naples (1074) – Norman conquest of Southern Italy
- Siege of Norwich Castle (1075) – Revolt of the Earls
- Siege of Syracuse (1076) – Norman conquest of Southern Italy
- Siege of Salerno (1076–1077) – Norman conquest of Southern Italy
- Siege of Sigmaringen (1077) – Great Saxon Revolt
- Siege of Würzburg (1077) – Great Saxon Revolt
- Siege of La Flèche (1077)
- Siege of Trapani (1077) – Norman conquest of Southern Italy
- Siege of Naples (1077–78) – Norman conquest of Southern Italy
- Siege of Tübingen (1078) – Great Saxon Revolt
- Siege of Taormina (1078) – Norman conquest of Southern Italy
- Siege of Gerberoi (1080)
- Siege of La Flèche (1081)
- Siege of Durazzo (1081) – Byzantine–Norman wars
- Siege of Rome (1081–1084)
- Siege of Almenar (1082)
- Siege of Larissa (1082–1083) – Byzantine–Norman wars
- Siege of Carpi (1083)
- Siege of Castel Sant'Angelo (1084)
- Siege of Augsburg (1084) – Great Saxon Revolt
- Siege of Burgdorf (1084) – Great Saxon Revolt
- Siege of Toledo (1085) – Reconquista
- Siege of Antioch (1085)
- Siege of Syracuse (1086) – Norman conquest of Southern Italy
- Siege of Regensburg (1086) – Great Saxon Revolt
- Siege of Würzburg (1086) – Great Saxon Revolt
- Siege of Numa (1086) – Gosannen War
- Siege of Agrigento (1087) – Norman conquest of Southern Italy
- Siege of Castrogiovanni (1087) – Norman conquest of Southern Italy
- Siege of Tudela (1087) – Reconquista
- Siege of Kanazawa (1087) – Gosannen War
- Siege of Pevensey Castle (1088) – Rebellion of 1088
- Siege of Rochester Castle (1088) – Rebellion of 1088
- Siege of Gleichen (1088) – Great Saxon Revolt
- Siege of Quedlinburg (1088) – Great Saxon Revolt
- Siege of Butera (1089) – Norman conquest of Southern Italy
- Siege of Mantua (1090–1091)
- Siege of Toledo (1090) – Reconquista
- Siege of Governolo (1090)
- Siege of Courcy (1091)
- Siege of Seville (1091)
- Siege of Alamut (1092) – Nizari–Seljuk conflicts
- Siege of Dara (1092) – Nizari–Seljuk conflicts
- Siege of Breval (1092)
- Siege of Monteveglio (1092)
- Siege of Valencia (1092–1094) – Reconquista
- Siege of Huesca (1094) – Reconquista
- Siege of Chernigov (1094)
- Siege of Nogara (1094)
- Siege of Tynemouth Castle (1095)
- Siege of Morpeth Castle (1095)
- Siege of Newcastle (1095)
- Siege of Bamburgh Castle (1095)
- Siege of Amalfi (1096)
- Siege of Xerigordos (1096) – part of the People's Crusade
- Siege of Wieselburg (1096)
- Siege of Huesca (1096) – Reconquista
- Siege of Lamasar – Nizari uprising
- Siege of Nicaea (1097) – part of the First Crusade
- Siege of Antioch (1097–1098) – part of the First Crusade
- Siege of Capua (1098)
- Siege of Jerusalem (1098)
- Siege of Ma'arra (1098) – part of the First Crusade, known because of acts of cannibalism.
- Siege of Kållandsö Fort (1099)
- Siege of Arqa (1099) – part of the First Crusade
- Siege of Valencia (1099–1102) – Reconquista
- Siege of Jerusalem (1099) – part of the First Crusade
- Siege of Mayet (1099)
- Siege of Latakia (1099)
- First siege of Arsuf (1099) – Crusades
- Siege of Haifa (1100) – Crusades
- Siege of Le Mans (1100)

=== 12th century ===
- Second siege of Arsuf (1101) – Crusades
- Siege of Caesarea (1101) – Crusades
- Siege of Latakia (1101–1103)
- Siege of Acre (1102) – Crusades
- Siege of Arundel (1102)
- Siege of Bridgnorth (1102)
- Siege of Jaffa (1102) – Crusades
- Siege of Tripoli (1102–1109) – Crusades
- Siege of Acre (1103) – Crusades
- Siege of Al-Rahba (1103)
- Siege of Acre (1104) – Crusades
- Siege of Takrit (sometime between 1105 and 1107) – Nizari–Seljuk conflicts
- Siege of Alamut (sometime between 1106 and 1109) – Nizari–Seljuk conflicts
- Siege of Shahdez (1107) – Nizari–Seljuk conflicts
- Siege of Nuremberg (1105)
- Siege of Cologne (1106)
- Siege of Apamea (1106) – Crusades, conflicts with the Assassins
- Siege of Apamea (September 1106) – Crusades, conflicts with the Assassins
- Siege of Malatya (1106)
- Siege of Castellum Arnaldi (1106) – Crusades
- Siege of Al-Rahba (1107)
- Siege of Hebron (1107) – Crusades
- Siege of Douai (1107)
- Siege of Dyrrhachium (1107–1108) – Byzantine–Norman wars
- Siege of Uclés (1108) – Reconquista
- Siege of Bratislava (1108)
- Siege of Sidon (1108) – Crusades
- Siege of Jableh (1109) – Crusades
- Siege of Nakło (1109)
- Siege of Głogów (1109)
- Siege of Baalbek (1110)
- Siege of Beirut (1110) – Crusades
- Siege of Novara (1110)
- Siege of Sidon (1110) – Norwegian Crusade
- Siege of Atarib (1110) – Crusades
- Siege of Le Puiset (1111)
- Siege of Vetula (1111) – Crusades
- Siege of Tyre (1111–1112) – Crusades
- Siege of Nicaea (1113) – Byzantine–Seljuq wars
- Siege of Hornburg Castle (1113)
- Siege of Mousson (1113)
- Siege of Bar (1113)
- Siege of Cologne (1114)
- Siege of Kafartab (1115) – Crusades
- Siege of Jaffa (1115) – Crusades
- Siege of Marqab (1116) – Crusades
- Siege of Alamut (1117–1118) – Nizari–Seljuk conflicts
- Siege of Lambsar (1117–1118) – Nizari–Seljuk conflicts
- Siege of Laodicea (1119) – Byzantine–Seljuq wars
- Siege of Sozopolis (1120) – Byzantine–Seljuq wars
- Siege of Jerash (1121) – Crusades
- Siege of Mainz (1121)
- Siege of Tbilisi (1121–1122) – Georgian–Seljuk wars
- Siege of Aschaffenburg Castle (1122)
- Siege of Faulquemont Castle (1122)
- Siege of Zardana (1122) – Crusades
- Siege of Balis (1122) – Crusades
- Siege of Kharput (1123) – Crusades
- Siege of Jaffa (1123) – Crusades
- Siege of Schulenburg Castle (1123)
- Siege of Manbij (1124)
- Siege of Azaz (1124) – Crusades
- Siege of Tyre (1124) – Crusades
- Siege of Aleppo (1124–1125) – Crusades
- Siege of Raffaniya (1126) – Crusades
- Siege of Al-Rahba (1127)
- Siege of Bayonne (1130–1131)
- Siege of De'an (1132) – Jin–Song Wars
- Siege of Kastamone (1132)
- Siege of Kastamone (1133)
- Siege of Savur (1134) – Crusades
- Siege of Gangra (1135)
- Siege of Montferrand (1137) – Crusades
- Siege of Anazarbos (1137) – Crusades
- Siege of Vahka (1137) – Crusades
- Siege of Antioch (1137) – Crusades
- Siege of Kafartab (1138) – Crusades
- Siege of Aleppo (1138) – Crusades
- Siege of Shaizar (1138) – Crusades
- Siege of Buza'a (1138) – Crusades
- Siege of Coria (1138) – Reconquista
- Siege of Baalbek (1139)
- Siege of Oreja (1139) – Reconquista
- Siege of Neocaesarea (1139–1140)
- Siege of Weinsberg (1140)
- Siege of Banias (1140) – Crusades
- Siege of Coria (1142) – Reconquista
- Siege of Lisbon (1142) – Reconquista
- Siege of Li Vaux Moise (1144) – Crusades

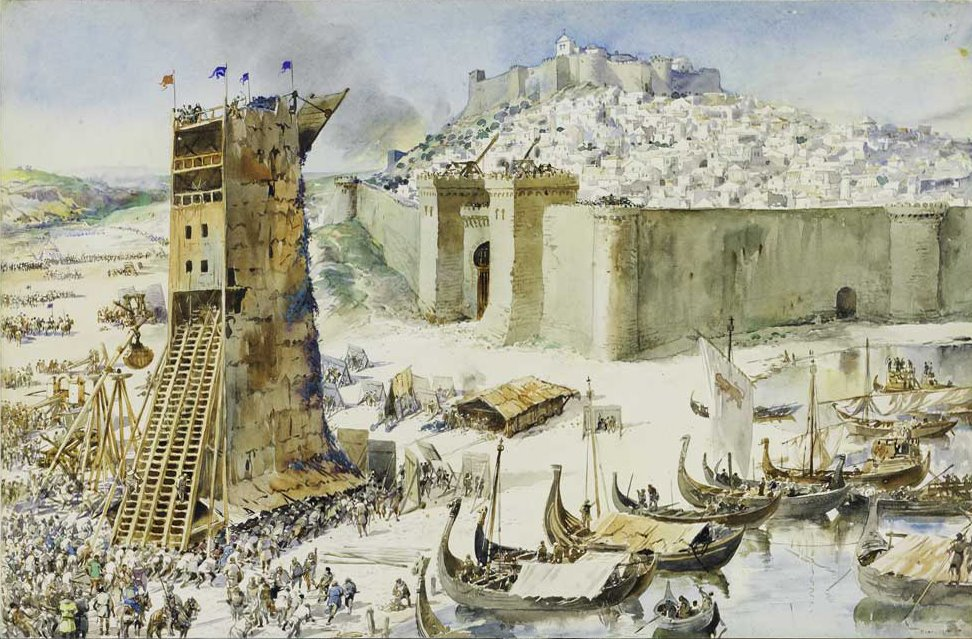
Siege of Lisbon (1147) by Alfredo Roque Gameiro (1917)

- Siege of Edessa (1144) – Crusades
- Siege of Al-Bira (1144) – Crusades
- Siege of Edessa (1146) – Crusades
- Siege of Almería (1147) – Reconquista
- Siege of Lisbon (1147) – Reconquista
- Siege of Tortosa (1148) – Reconquista
- Siege of Damascus (1148) – Second Crusade
- Siege of Turbessel (1150) – Crusades
- Siege of Jerusalem (1152) – Crusades
- Siege of Ascalon (1153) – Crusades
- Siege of Braničevo (1154)
- Siege of Tortona (1155)
- Siege of Brindisi (1155–1156)
- Siege of Shirakawa-den (1156)
- Siege of Baghdad (1157)
- Siege of Banias (1157) – Crusades
- Siege of Shaizar (1157) – Crusades
- Siege of Casalia (1157–1158) – Crusades
- Siege of Harim (1158) – Crusades
- Siege of Milan (1158) – part of the wars between Holy Roman Emperor Frederick I and the Northern Italy cities
- Siege of Crema (1159–1160) – part of the wars between Holy Roman Emperor Frederick I and the Northern Italy cities
- Siege of Sanjō Palace (1160) – the main action of the Heiji Rebellion took place in Kyoto
- Siege of Ani (1161) – Georgian–Seljuk wars
- Siege of Milan (1161–62) – part of the wars between Holy Roman Emperor Frederick I and the Northern Italy cities
- Siege of Harim (1164)
- Siege of Banias (1164)
- Siege of Alexandria (1167) – Crusader invasions of Egypt
- Siege of Wexford (1169) – the first major clash of the Norman invasion of Ireland
- Siege of Damietta (1169) – Crusader invasions of Egypt
- Siege of Kerak (1170) – Crusades
- Siege of Sinjar (1170)
- Siege of Kerak (1173) – Crusades
- Siege of Derbent (1173) – Caspian expeditions of the Rus'
- Siege of Alexandria (1174)
- Siege of Alessandria (1174–1175) – part of the wars between Holy Roman Emperor Frederick I and the Northern Italy cities
- Siege of Homs (1175)
- Siege of Montferrand (1175)
- Siege of Sinjar (1175)
- Siege of Azaz (1176)
- Siege of Masyaf (1176)
- Siege of Harim (1177) – Crusades
- Siege of Demmin (1177) – Brandenburg–Pomeranian conflict
- Conquest of Cuenca (1177) – Reconquista
- Siege of Claudiopolis (1179) – Byzantine–Seljuq wars
- Siege of Jacob's Ford (1179) – Crusades
- Siege of Nara (1180) – Genpei War
- Siege of Beirut (1182) – Crusades
- Siege of Mosul (1182)
- Siege of Amida (1183)
- Siege of Hiuchi (1183) – Genpei War
- Siege of Fukuryūji (1183) – Genpei War
- Siege of Tell Khalid (1183)
- Siege of Kerak (1183) – Crusades
- Siege of Hōjūjidono (1184) – Genpei War
- Siege of Santarém (1184)
- Siege of Kerak (1184) – Crusades
- Sack of Thessalonica (1185) by the Normans
- Siege of Mayyafariqin (1185)
- Siege of Lovech (1187)
- Siege of Tiberias (1187) – Crusades
- Siege of Toron (1187) – Crusades
- Siege of Ascalon (1187) – Crusades
- Siege of Jerusalem (1187) – Crusades
- Siege of Tyre (1187) – Crusades
- Siege of Kerak (1187–1188) – Crusades
- Siege of Sahyun Castle (1188) – Crusades
- Siege of al-Shughur (1188) – Crusades
- Siege of Bourzey Castle (1188) – Crusades

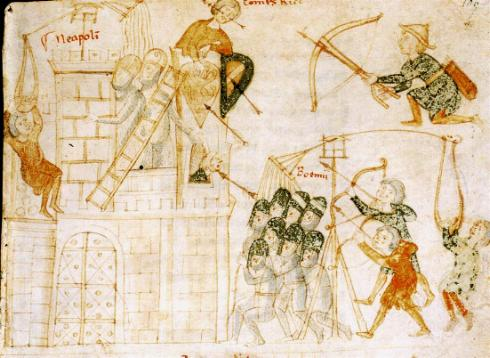
Siege of Naples in 1191 by the forces of Holy Roman Emperor Henry VI, Peter of Eboli, Liber ad honorem Augusti, Palermo, 1196

- Siege of Trapessac (1188) – Crusades
- Siege of Baghras (1188) – Crusades
- Siege of Safed (1188) – Crusades
- Siege of Belvoir (1188) – Crusades
- Siege of Acre (1189–1191) – Third Crusade
- Siege of Naples (1191)
- Siege of Jaffa (1192) – Third Crusade
- Siege of Verneuil (1194)
- Siege of Loches (1195)
- Siege of Aumâle (1196)
- Siege of Jaffa (1197) – Crusades
- Siege of Toron (1197–1198) – Crusade of 1197
- Siege of Châlus (1199)
- Siege of Montferrand (1199)

=== 13th century ===
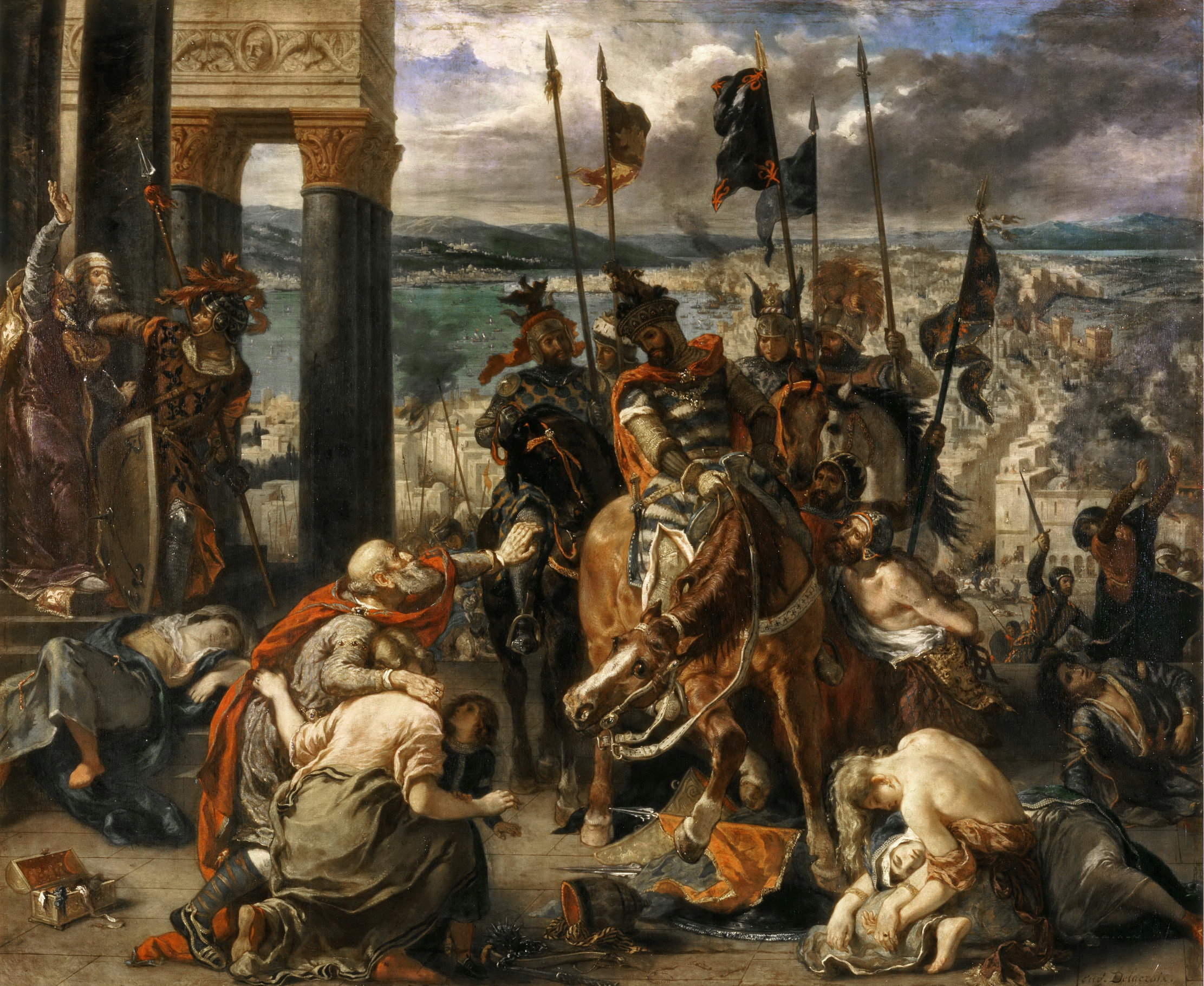
The Entry of the Crusaders into Constantinople (1204) Eugène Delacroix. Oil on canvas, 1840

- Siege of Varna (1201) – Byzantine-Bulgarian Wars
- Siege of Zadar (1202) – part of the Fourth Crusade
- Siege of Constantinople (1203) – part of the Fourth Crusade
- Siege of Château Gaillard (1203–1204) – French invasion of Normandy (1202–1204)
- Siege of Constantinople (1204) – part of the Fourth Crusade
- Siege of Trebizond (1205–1206) – Byzantine–Seljuk Wars
- Siege of Cologne (1205–1206) – German throne dispute
- Siege of Tripoli (1207) – Crusades
- Siege of Antalya (1207) – Byzantine–Seljuk Wars
- Siege of Beverin (1208) – Livonian Crusade
- Siege of Carcassonne (1209) – Albigensian Crusade
- Siege of Bram (1210) – Albigensian Crusade
- Siege of Al-Dāmūs (1210) – Reconquista
- Siege of Cēsis (1210) – Livonian Crusade
- Siege of Minerve (1210) – Albigensian Crusade
- Siege of Termes (1210) – Albigensian Crusade
- Siege of Lavaur (1211) - Albigensian Crusade
- Siege of Montferrand (1211) – Albigensian Crusade
- Siege of Toulouse (1211) – Albigensian Crusade
- Siege of Castelnaudary (1211) – Albigensian Crusade
- Siege of Beverin (1211) – Livonian Crusade
- Siege of Viljandi (1211) – Livonian Crusade
- Siege of Penne d'Agenais (1212) – Albigensian Crusade
- Siege of Weissensee (1212) – German throne dispute
- Siege of Ganja (1213)
- Siege of Sinope (1214) – Byzantine–Seljuk Wars
- Siege of Zhongdu (1215) – Genghis Khan conquers Zhongdu, now Beijing
- Siege of Rochester castle (1215) – King John's Danish mercenaries attempt to take the castle of Rochester during the First Baron's war.
- Siege of Beaucaire (1216) – Albigensian Crusade
- Siege of Dover Castle (1216) – first Barons' War
- Siege of Windsor Castle (1216) – first Barons' War
- Siege of Hertford (1216) – first Barons' War

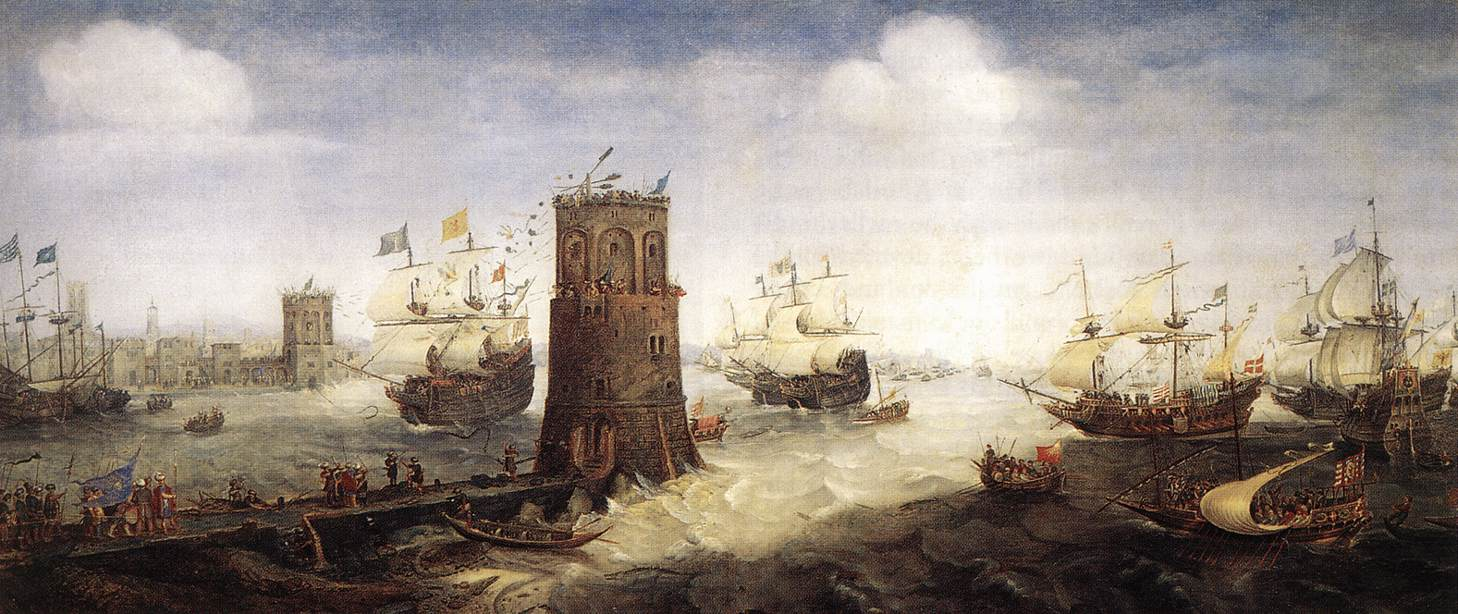
Crusaders attack the tower of Damietta (1218). A 1625 painting by Cornelis Claesz van Wieringen.

- Siege of Lincoln Castle (1217) – first Barons' War
- Siege of Mount Tabor (1217) – Crusades
- Siege of Toulouse (1217–18) – Albigensian Crusade
- Siege of Damietta (1218) – Fifth Crusade
- Siege of Marmande (1219) – Albigensian Crusade
- Siege of Toulouse (1219) – Albigensian Crusade
- Siege of Caesarea (1220) – Crusades
- Siege of Castelnaudary (1220–1221) – Albigensian Crusade
- Siege of Bamyan – Mongol conquest of Khwarezmia
- Siege of Nishapur (1221) – Mongol conquest of Khwarezmia
- Siege of Reval (1221) – Livonian Crusade
- Siege of Trebizond (1222–1223) – Byzantine–Seljuk Wars
- Siege of Reval (1223) – Livonian Crusade
- Siege of Fellin (1223) – Livonian Crusade
- Siege of Reval (1223) – Livonian Crusade
- Siege of Lohu (1223–1224) – Livonian Crusade
- Siege of La Rochelle (1224)
- Siege of Tartu (1224) – Livonian Crusade
- Siege of Jaén (1225) – Reconquista
- Siege of Avignon (1226) – Albigensian Crusade
- Siege of Toulouse (1226) – Albigensian Crusade
- Siege of Akhlat (1229)
- Siege of Jaén (1230) – Reconquista
- Siege of Beirut (1231–1232)
- Siege of Amida (1232)
- Siege of Kaifeng (1232–1233) – Mongol conquest of the Jin dynasty
- Siege of Karacahisar (By Ertuğrul) (1232) - Early Ottoman Conquests.
- Siege of Burriana (1233) – Reconquista
- Siege of Caizhou (1233–1234) – Mongol conquest of the Jin dynasty

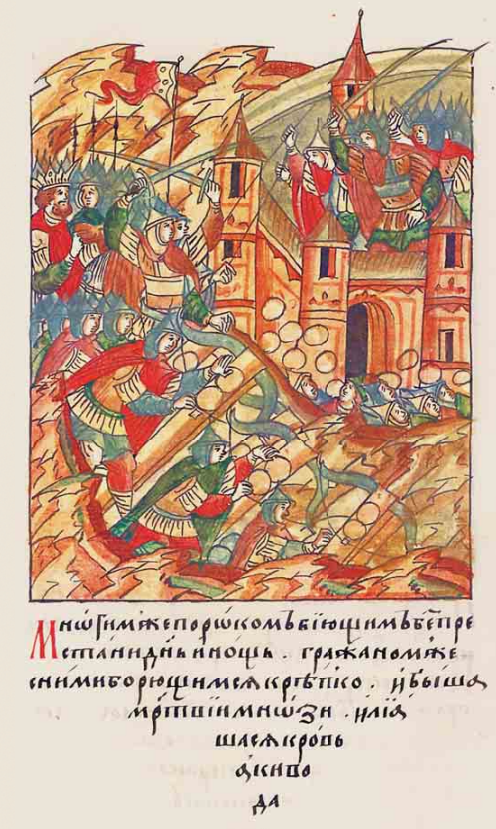
16th century illustration of the Mongol siege of Kiev in 1240.

- Siege of Constantinople (1235) – a joint Bulgarian-Nicaean siege on the capital of the Latin Empire.
- Siege of Bilär (1236) – Mongol invasion of Volga Bulgaria
- Siege of Córdoba (1236) – Reconquista
- Siege of Khokhanaberd (1236) – Mongol invasions of Caucasus
- Siege of Ryazan (1237) – Mongol invasion of Rus'
- Siege of Kolomna (1237–1238) – Mongol invasion of Rus'
- Siege of Moscow (1238) – Mongol invasion of Rus'
- Siege of Vladimir (1238) – Mongol invasion of Rus'
- Siege of Kozelsk (1238) – Mongol invasion of Rus'
- Siege of Valencia (1238) – Reconquista
- Siege of Brescia (1238) – part of the wars between Holy Roman Emperor Frederick II and the Lombard League
- Siege of Mt. Tebulosmta (1238-1250) – Mongol invasions of Durdzuketia
- Siege of Faenza (1239) – part of the wars between Holy Roman Emperor Frederick II and the Lombard League
- Siege of Jerusalem (1239) – Crusades
- Siege of Kiev (1240) – Mongol invasion of Rus'
- Siege of Lahore (1241) – Mongol invasions of India
- Siege of Esztergom (1242) – First Mongol invasion of Hungary, Citadel of Esztergom, Turoc, Nyitra, Győr, Pannonhalma, Székesfehérvár, Segesd, Varasd, Kemlék, Csázma, Zágráb, Trogir, Veszprém, Tihany, Moson, Sopron, Vasvár, Zala, Léka, Pozsony, Komárom, Fülek and Abaújvár besieged but successfully resisted
- Siege of Viterbo (1243) – part of the wars between Holy Roman Emperor Frederick II and the Lombard League
- Siege of Montségur (1243–1244) – Albigensian Crusade
- Siege of Jerusalem (1244) by the Khwarezmians
- Siege of Damascus (1245)
- Siege of Jaén (1245–46) – Reconquista
- Siege of Ascalon (1247) – Crusades
- Siege of Parma (1247–1248) – part of the wars between Holy Roman Emperor Frederick II and the Lombard League
- Siege of Seville (1247–1248) – Reconquista
- Siege of Aachen (1248)
- Siege of Homs (1248–1249)
- Siege of Damietta (1249) – Seventh Crusade
- Siege of Naples (1252)
- Siege of Cologne (1252)

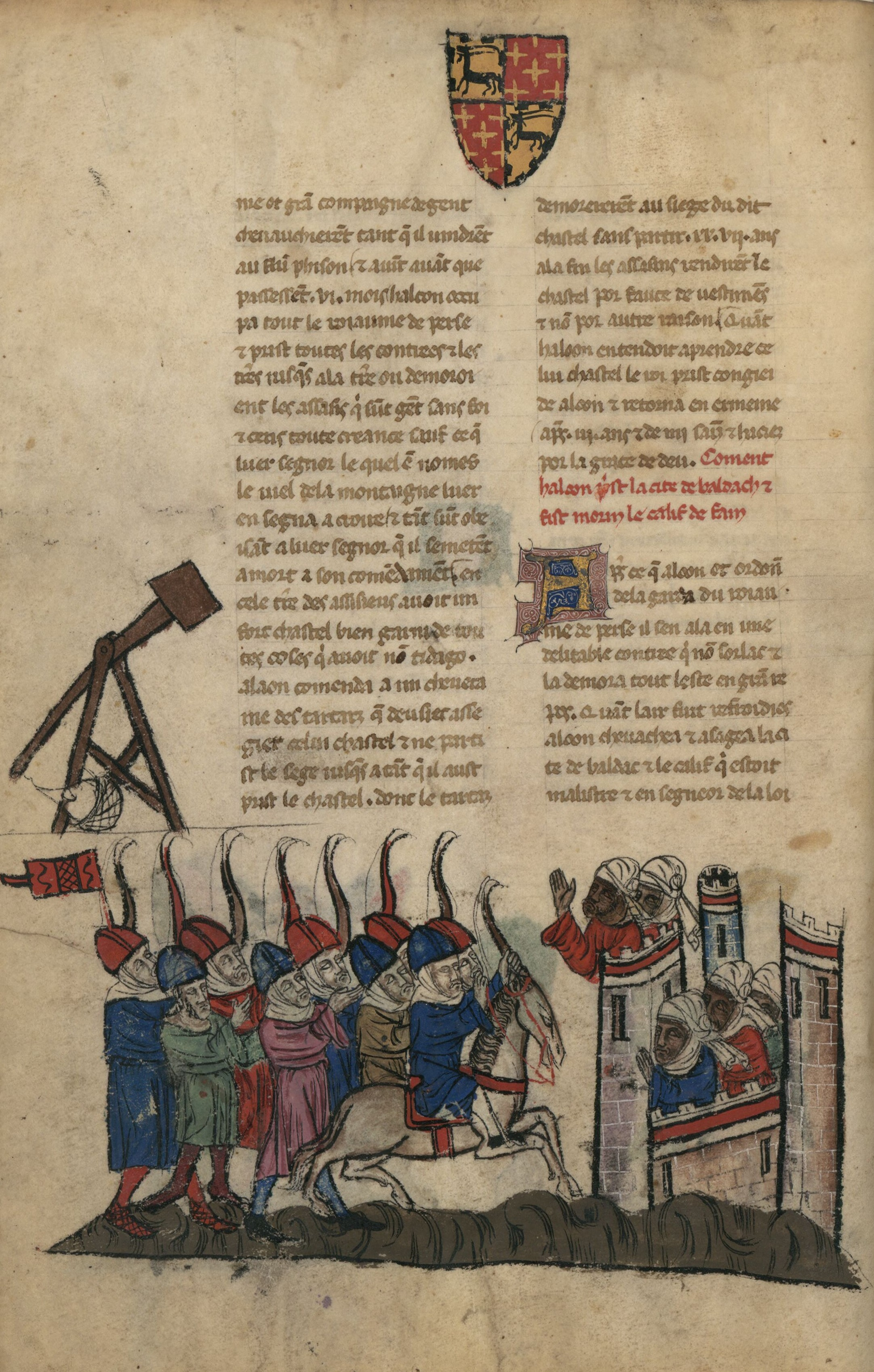
The Mongols besieged the "fortified mountain" of Gerdkuh for 17 years.

- Siege(s) of Gerdkuh (1253–1270) – Mongol campaign against the Nizaris
- Siege of Mehrin (1253)
- Siege of Tun (1253)
- Siege of Tun (1256)
- Siege of Maymun-Diz (1256)
- Siege of Alamut (1256)
- Siege of Lambsar (1256–1257)
- Siege of Cologne (1257)

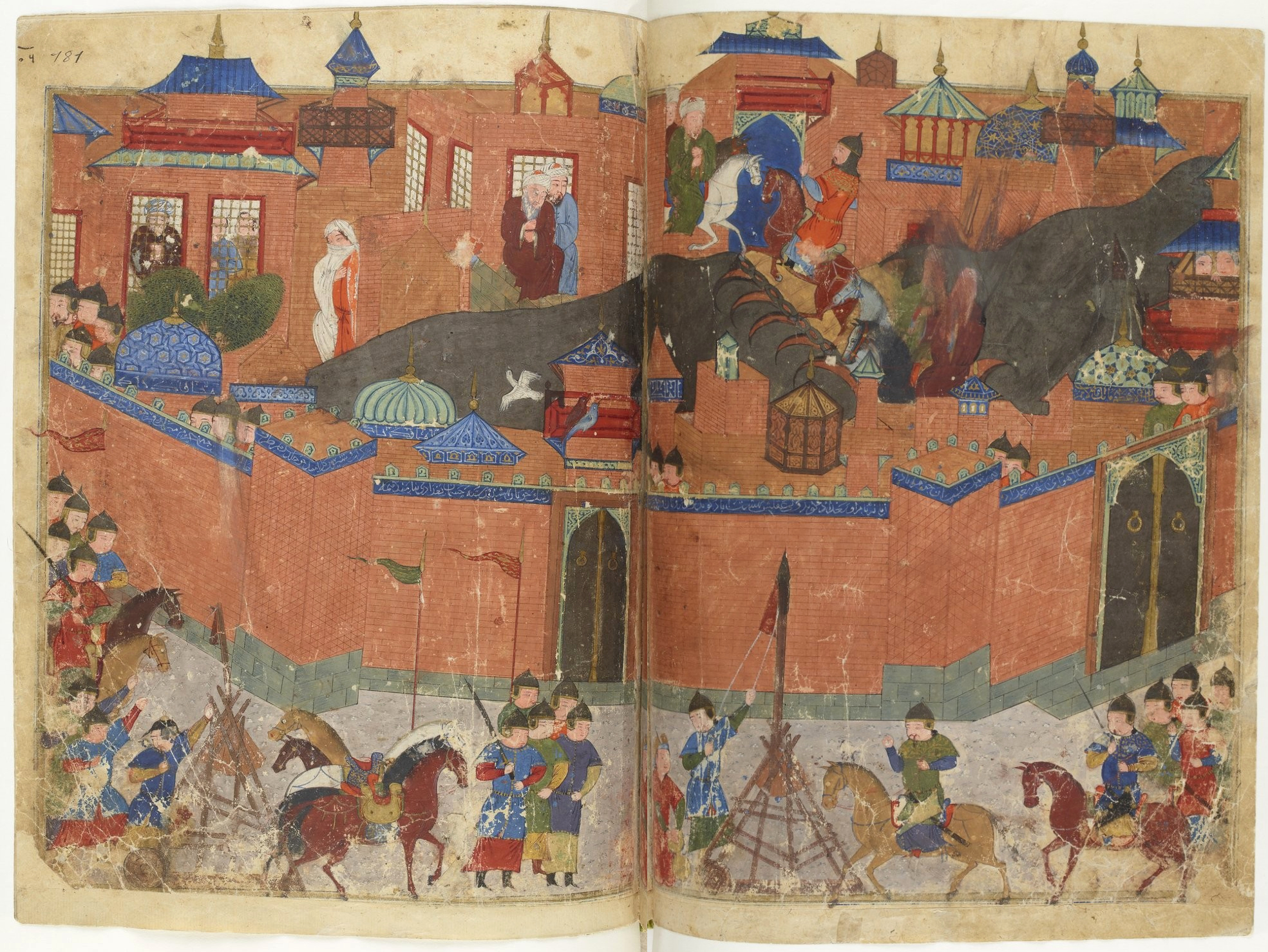
The Mongol army besieging Baghdad in 1258.

- Siege of Baghdad (1258)
- Siege of Mayyafariqin (1258–1259)
- Siege of Diaoyu Castle (1259) – Mongol conquest of the Song dynasty
- Siege of Al-Bira (1259) – Mongol invasions of the Levant
- Siege of Aleppo (1260)
- Siege of Constantinople (1260) – Nicaean–Latin wars
- Siege of Cologne (1262)
- Siege of Königsberg (1262–1265) – Prussian uprisings
- Siege of Bartenstein (1264) – Prussian uprisings
- Siege of al-Bira (1264–1265) – Mongol invasions of the Levant
- Fall of Arsuf (1265)
- Siege of Kenilworth (1266) – Second Barons' War
- Siege of Safed (1266)
- Siege of Xiangyang (1267–1273) – Mongol conquest of the Song dynasty
- Siege of Antioch (1268)

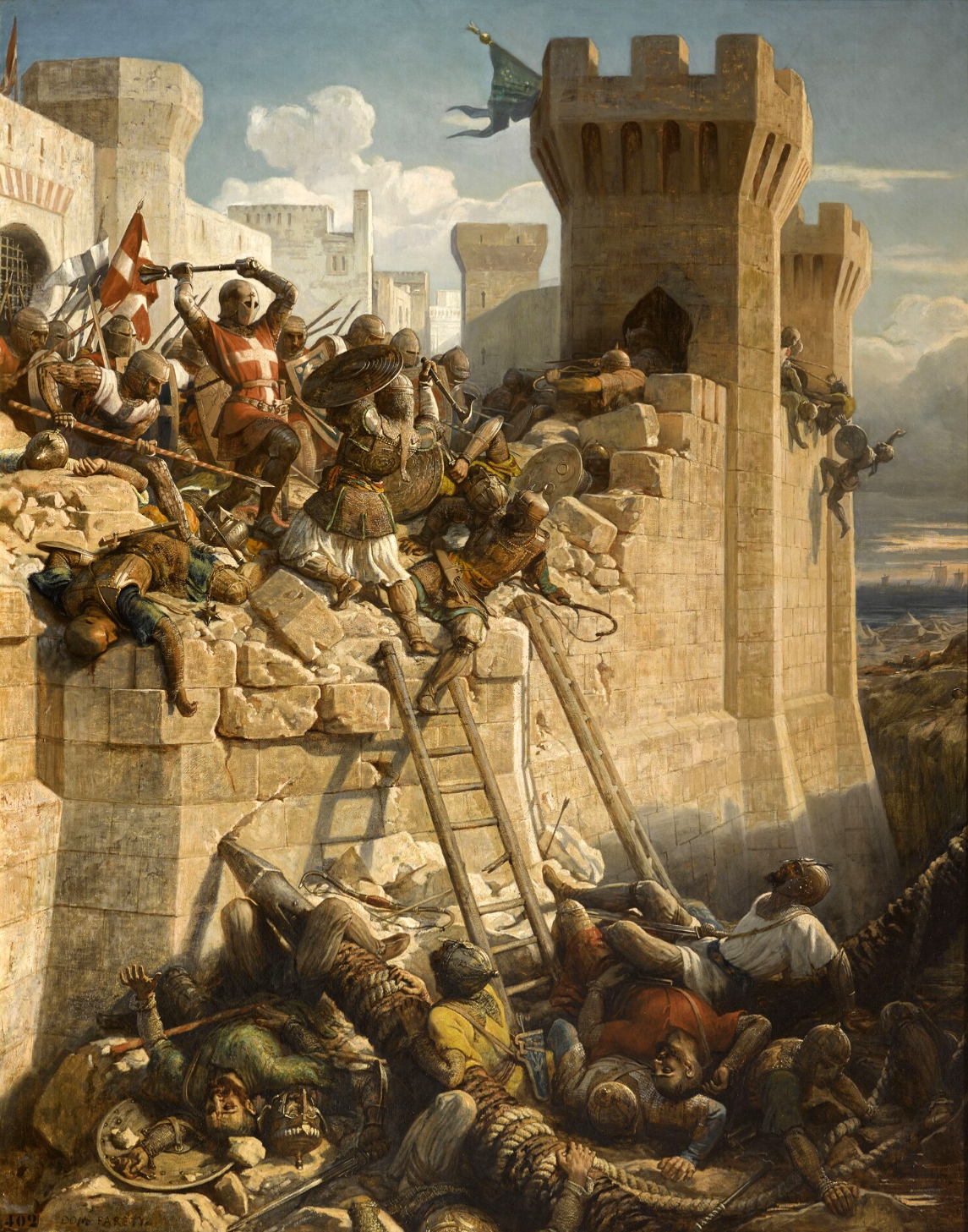
The Siege of Acre. The Hospitalier Master Mathieu de Clermont defending the walls in 1291 by Dominique Papety. 1840.

- Fall of Krak des Chevaliers (1271)
- Siege of Tripoli (1271)
- Siege of Al-Bira (1272) – Mongol invasions of the Levant
- Siege of Al-Rahba (1272) – Mongol invasions of the Levant
- Siege of Al-Bira (1275) – Mongol invasions of the Levant
- Siege of Algeciras (1278–1279) – Reconquista
- Siege of Berat (1280–1281)
- Siege of Margat (1282)
- Siege of Messina (1282)
- Siege of Trebizond (1282)
- Siege of Albarracín (1284)
- Siege of Kulaca Hisar (1285) - Early Ottoman Conquests.
- Siege of Karacahisar (1288) - Early Ottoman Conquests.
- Siege of Acre (1291)
- Siege of Rumkale (1292)
- Capture of Berwick (1296) – first War of Scottish Independence
- Siege of Lille (1297) – Franco-Flemish War
- Siege of Damascus (1299–1300) – Mongol invasions of the Levant

=== 14th century ===
- Siege of Ranthambore (1301)
- Siege of Ruad (1302)
- Siege of Buda by Charles I. (1302)
- Siege of Chittorgarh (1303)
- Siege of Stirling Castle (1304) – first War of Scottish Independence
- Siege of Zierikzee 1304
- Siege of Rhodes (1306–1310)
- Siege of Buda by Charles I. (1307)
- Siege of Gibraltar (1309) – first siege of Gibraltar, by Juan Alfonso de Guzman el Bueno in the Reconquista
- Siege of Algeciras (1309–10) – Reconquista
- Siege of Almería (1309) – Reconquista
- Siege of Warangal (1310)
- Siege of Dwarasamudra (1311)
- Siege of Florence (1312)
- Siege of Al-Rahba (1312–1313) – Mongol invasions of the Levant
- Siege of Roxburgh (1314) – first War of Scottish Independence
- Second siege of Gibraltar (1315) – second siege of Gibraltar, by the Nasrid caid Yahya in the Reconquista
- Siege of Carlisle (1315) – first War of Scottish Independence
- Siege of Christmemel (1315) – Lithuanian Crusade
- Siege of Warangal (1318)
- Siege of Berwick (1318) – first War of Scottish Independence
- Siege of Padua (1319–1320), by Cangrande I della Scala, lord of Verona
- Siege of Bursa (1320–1326) – Byzantine–Ottoman Wars
- Siege of Warangal (1323)
- Siege of Villa di Chiesa (1323–1324)
- Siege of Bristol (1326) – Invasion of England (1326)
- Siege of Nicaea (1328–1331) – Byzantine–Ottoman wars
- Siege of Medvėgalis (1329) – Lithuanian Crusade
- Siege of Kasagi (1331) – Genkō War
- Siege of Akasaka (1331) – Genkō War
- Third siege of Gibraltar – third siege of Gibraltar (1333), by a Marinids army, led by Abd al-Malik in the Reconquista
- Siege of Chihaya (1333) – Genkō War
- Siege of Berwick (1333)
- Fourth siege of Gibraltar – fourth siege of Gibraltar (1333), by King Alfonso XI of Castile in the Reconquista
- Siege of Kamakura (1333) – end of Ashikaga shogunate.
- Siege of Nicomedia (1333–1337) – Byzantine–Ottoman Wars
- Siege of Kanegasaki (1337)
- Siege of Kuromaru (1339)
- Siege of Tournai (1340) – part of the Hundred Years' War

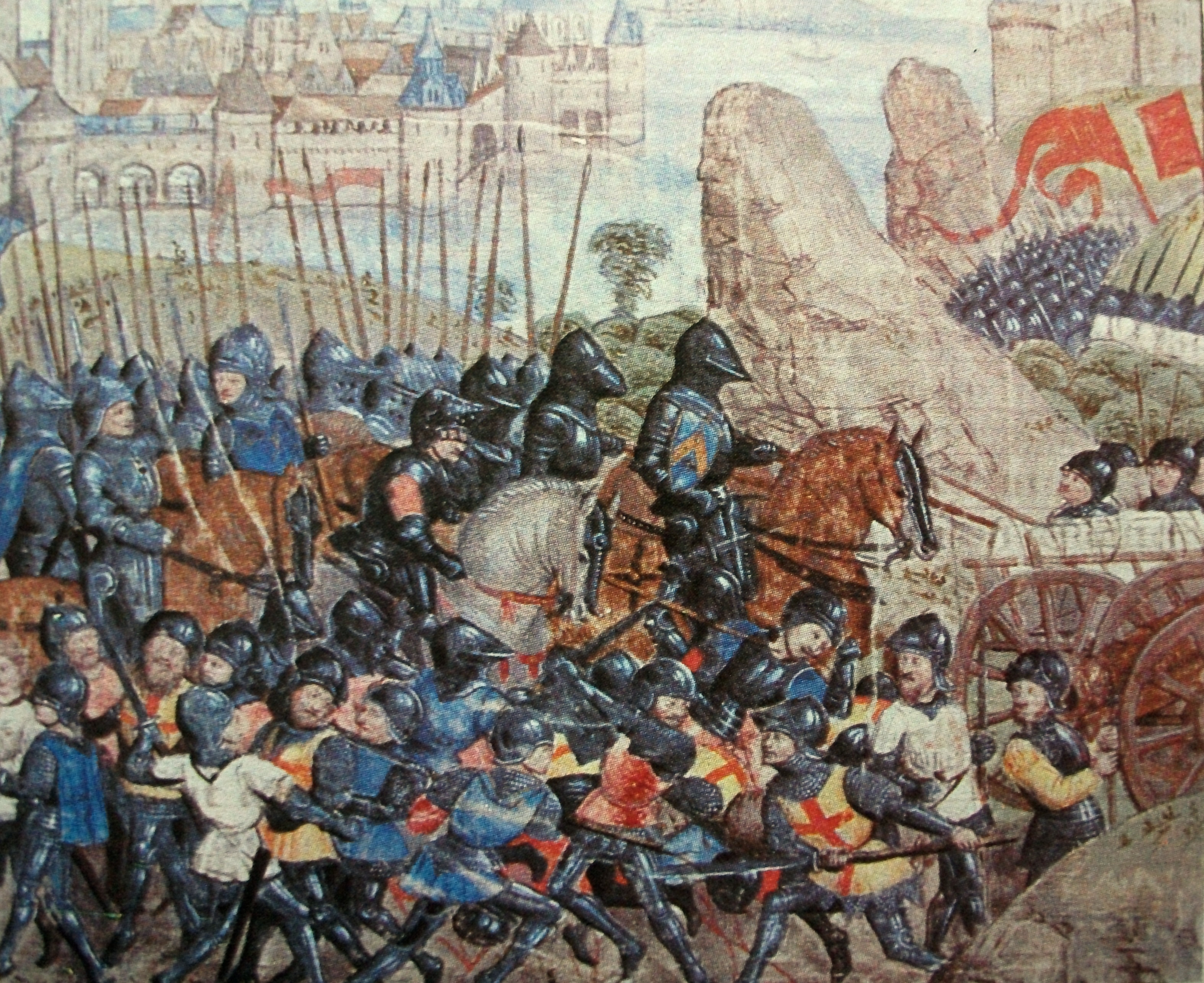
Siege of Calais (1346–1347)

- Siege of Vannes (1342) – part of the Hundred Years' War
- Siege of Hennebont (1342) – part of the Hundred Years' War
- Siege of Algeciras (1342–1344) – Reconquista
- Siege of Caffa (1346)
- Siege of Aiguillon (1346) – part of the Hundred Years' War
- Siege of Calais (1346–1347) – part of the Hundred Years' War
- Siege of Calais (1349) – part of the Hundred Years' War
- Siege of Gibraltar (1349–1350) – fifth siege of Gibraltar, by Alfonso XI in the Reconquista
- Siege of Saint-Jean-d'Angély (1351) – part of the Hundred Years' War
- Siege of Rennes (1356–57) – War of the Breton Succession
- Siege of Chartres (1360) – part of the Hundred Years' War
- Siege of Kaunas (1362) – Lithuanian Crusade
- Siege of León (1368)
- Siege of Algeciras (1369) – Reconquista
- Siege of Limoges (1370) – part of the Hundred Years' War
- Gibraltar (1374) – Moors of Fez cede Gibraltar to the Granadan Moors until 1410
- Siege of Philadelphia (1378–1390) – Byzantine–Ottoman Wars
- Siege of Moscow (1382)
- Siege of Sofia (1382 or 1385)
- Siege of Ypres (1383) – Despenser's Crusade
- Siege of Lisbon (1384) – 1383–1385 Portuguese interregnum
- Siege of Tbilisi (1386) – Timur's invasions of Georgia
- Siege of Isfahan (1387)
- Siege of Tarnovo (1393)
- Siege of Anjudan (1393)
- Siege of Constantinople (1394–1402) – Byzantine–Ottoman Wars

=== 15th century ===
- Siege of Sivas (1400)
- Siege of Damascus (1400)
- Siege of Smyrna (1402)
- Siege of Birtvisi (1403) – Timur's invasions of Georgia
- Siege of Mercq (1405) – part of the Hundred Years' War
- Siege of Marienburg (1410) – in the aftermath of the Battle of Grunwald
- Siege of Constantinople (1411) – Byzantine–Ottoman Wars, during the Ottoman Interregnum
- Sixth siege of Gibraltar (1411) – Granadan Moors regain control from Fez
- Siege of Bourges (1412) – Armagnac–Burgundian Civil War

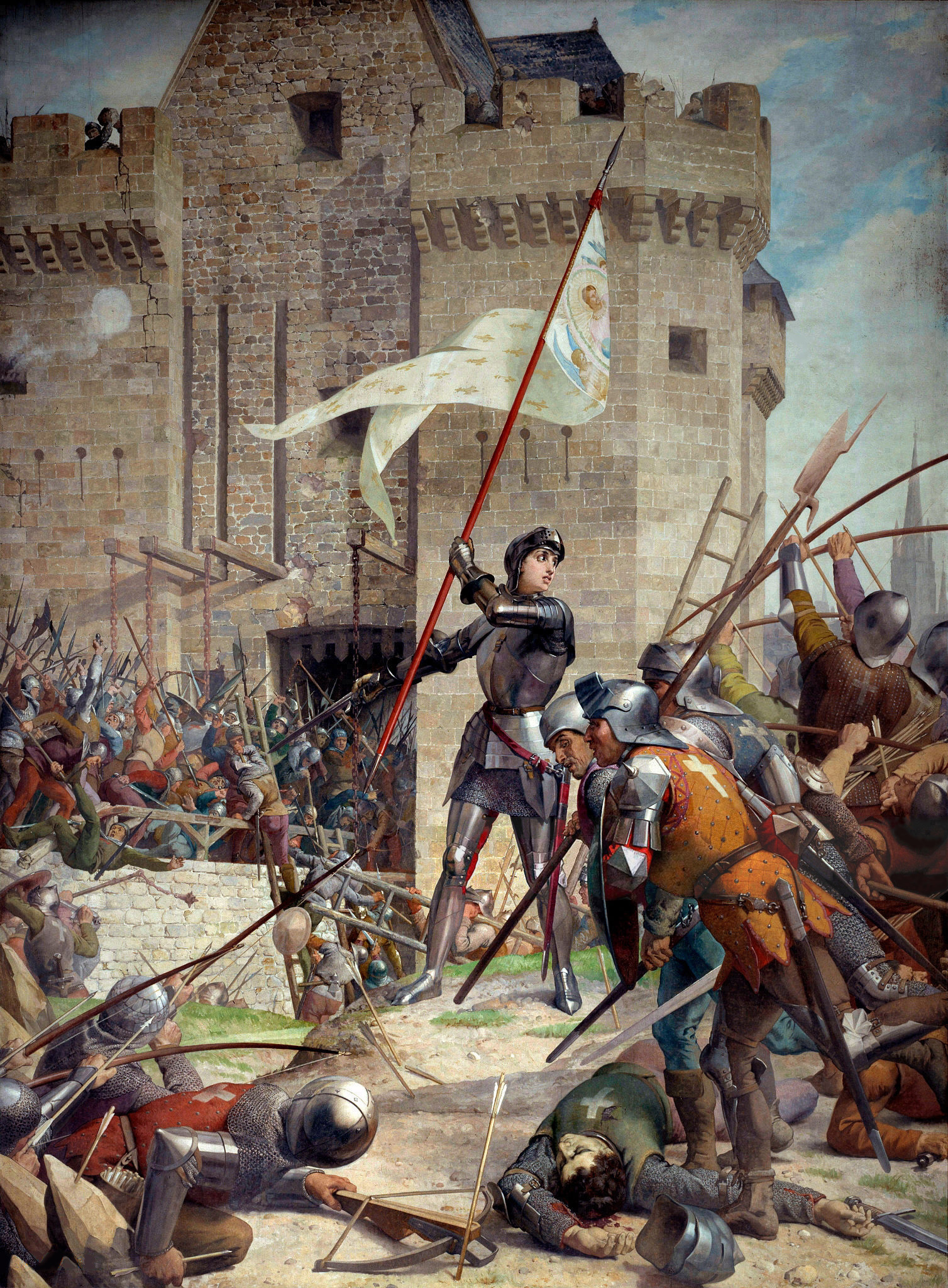
Joan of Arc at the Siege of Orléans (1429) by Jules Eugène Lenepveu, painted 1886–1890

- Siege of Harfleur (1415) – reopening of the Hundred Years' War
- Siege of Rouen (1418–1419) – part of the Hundred Years' War
- Siege of Đông Quan (1418–1428) – Lam Sơn uprising
- Siege of Ceuta (1419)
- Siege of Sarai (1420)
- Siege of Meaux (1421–1422) – part of the Hundred Years' War
- Siege of Constantinople (1422) – Byzantine–Ottoman Wars
- Siege of Thessalonica (1422–1430)– Byzantine–Ottoman and Ottoman-Venetian Wars
- Siege of Golubac (1428)
- Siege of Orléans (1428–1429) – part of the Hundred Years' War
- Siege of Inverness (1429)
- Siege of Paris (1429) – part of the Hundred Years' War
- Siege of Malta (1429)
- Siege of Saint-Pierre-le-Moûtier – Armagnac–Burgundian Civil War
- Siege of La Charité (1429) – Armagnac–Burgundian Civil War
- Siege of Compiègne (1430) – part of the Hundred Years' War
- Siege of Angkor (1431)
- Siege of Pouancé (1432) – part of the Hundred Years' War
- Siege of Pilsen (1433–34) – Hussite Wars
- Siege of Gaeta (1435)
- Siege of Saint-Denis (1435) – part of the Hundred Years' War
- Siege of Calais (1436) – part of the Hundred Years' War
- Seventh siege of Gibraltar (1436) – siege of Gibraltar by the count of Niebla in the Reconquista
- Siege of Tangiers (1437)

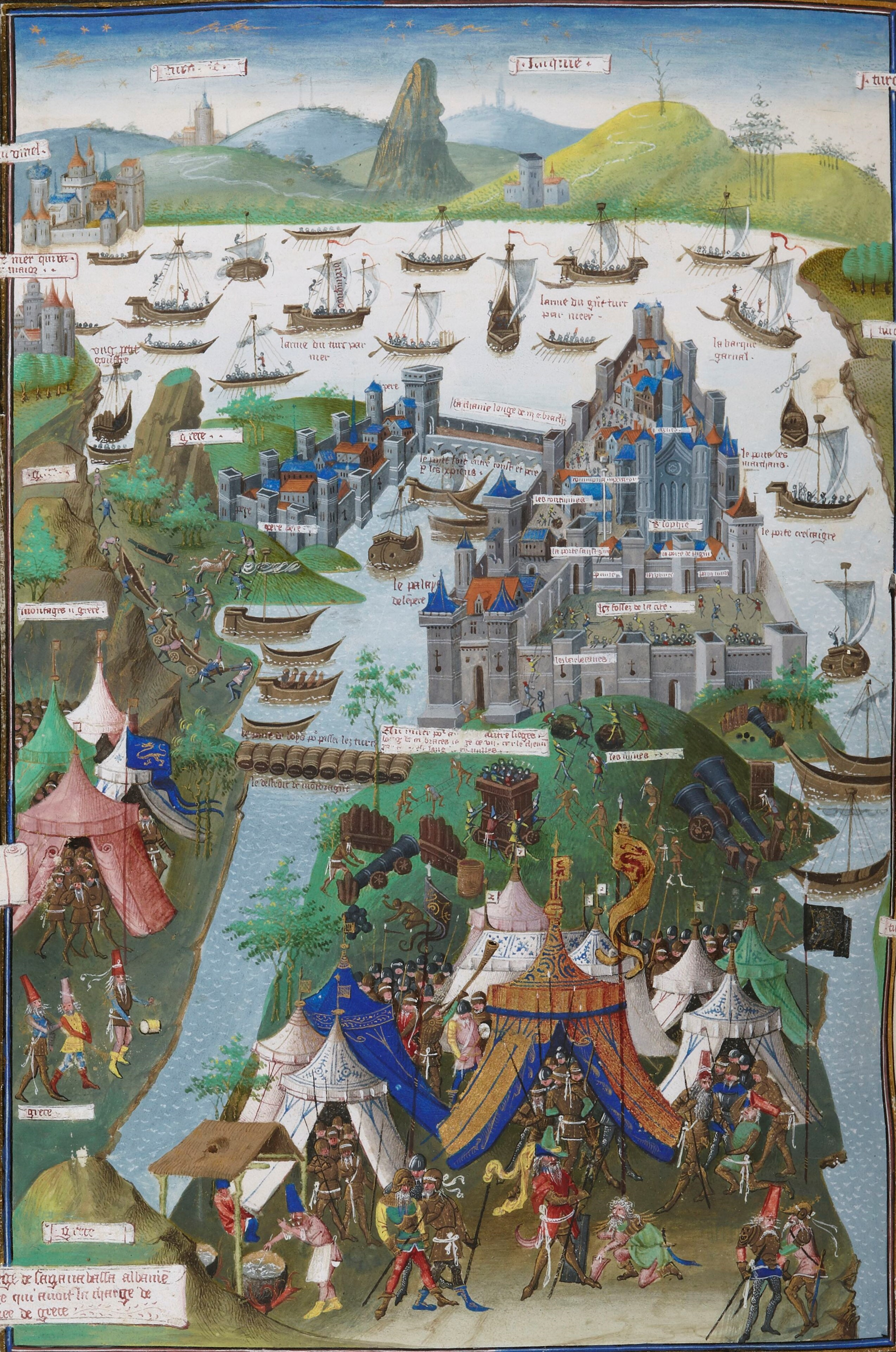
Fall of Constantinople (1453)

- Siege of Belgrade (1440)
- Siege of Tartas (1440–1442) – part of the Hundred Years' War
- Siege of Novo Brdo (1440–41)
- Siege of Metz (1444)
- Siege of Rhodes (1444)
- Siege of Balkh (1447)
- Siege of Herat (1448)
- Siege of Svetigrad (1448)
- Siege of Krujë (1450)
- Siege of Constantinople (1453) – Byzantine–Ottoman Wars

== Early modern ==
=== 15th century ===
- Siege of Marienburg (1454) – Thirteen Years' War (1454–66)
- Siege of Berat (1455)
- Siege of Belgrade (1456) – part of Ottoman wars in Europe
- Siege of Deventer (1456)
- Siege of Marienburg (1457–1460) – Thirteen Years' War (1454–66)
- Siege of Roxburgh (1460)
- Siege of Trebizond (1460–1461)
- Siege of Harlech Castle (1461–68) – part of Wars of the Roses. Longest siege in British history.
- Siege of Shahrukhiya (1461–63)
- Siege of Hostalric (1462) – Catalan Civil War
- Eighth Siege of Gibraltar (1462), by a Castilian army in the Reconquista
- Siege of Mytilene (1462)
- Siege of Barcelona (1462) – Catalan Civil War

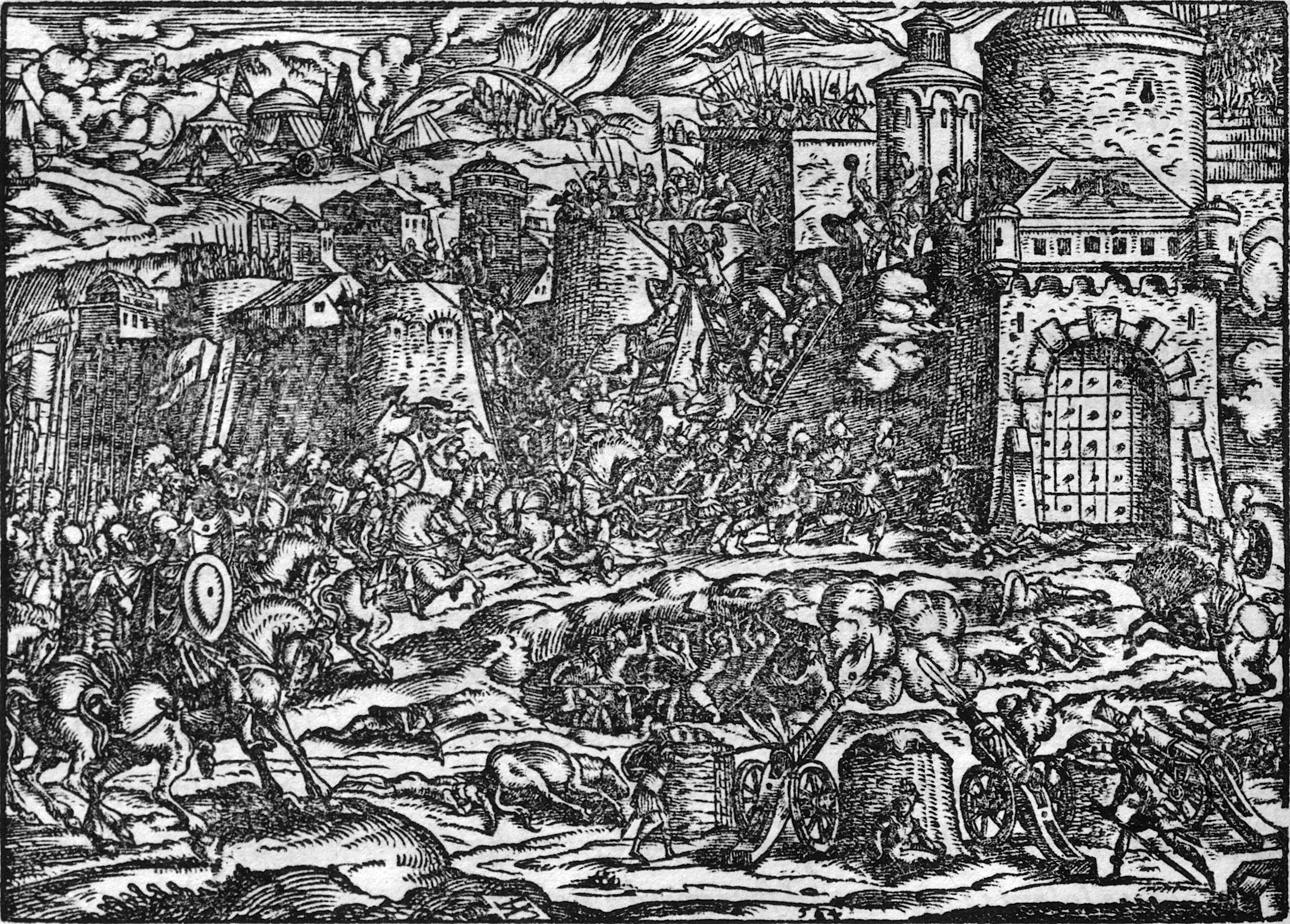
Siege of Krujë in 1466. Woodcut by Jost Amman, from Philipp Lonicer, Chronicorum Turcicorum, Frankfurt 1578

- Siege of Jajce (1463)
- Siege of Jajce (1464)
- Siege of Barur (1464)
- Siege of Barcelona (1465) – Catalan Civil War
- Ninth Siege of Gibraltar (1466–1467), by the Duke of Medina Sidonia
- Siege of Krujë (1466–67)
- Siege of Krujë (1467)
- Siege of Negroponte (1470) – Ottoman–Venetian War (1463–1479)
- Siege of Barcelona (1472), during the Catalan Civil War
- Siege of Shkodra (1474)
- Siege of Neuss (1474–1475) – Burgundian Wars
- Siege of Burgos (1475–1476) – War of the Castilian Succession
- Siege of Neamț Citadel (1476)
- Siege of Krujë (1477–1478)
- Siege of Shkodra (1478–1479)
- Siege of Gdov (1480) – Russian-Livonian War (1480-1481)
- Siege of Izborsk (1480) – Russian-Livonian War (1480–81)
- Siege of Izborsk (1480) (2nd) – Russian-Livonian War (1480–81)
- Siege of Pskov (1480) – Russian-Livonian War (1480–81)
- Siege of Rhodes (1480) – first siege of Rhodes
- Sieges of Otranto (1480–1481)
- Siege of Fellin (1481) – Russian-Livonian War (1480–81)

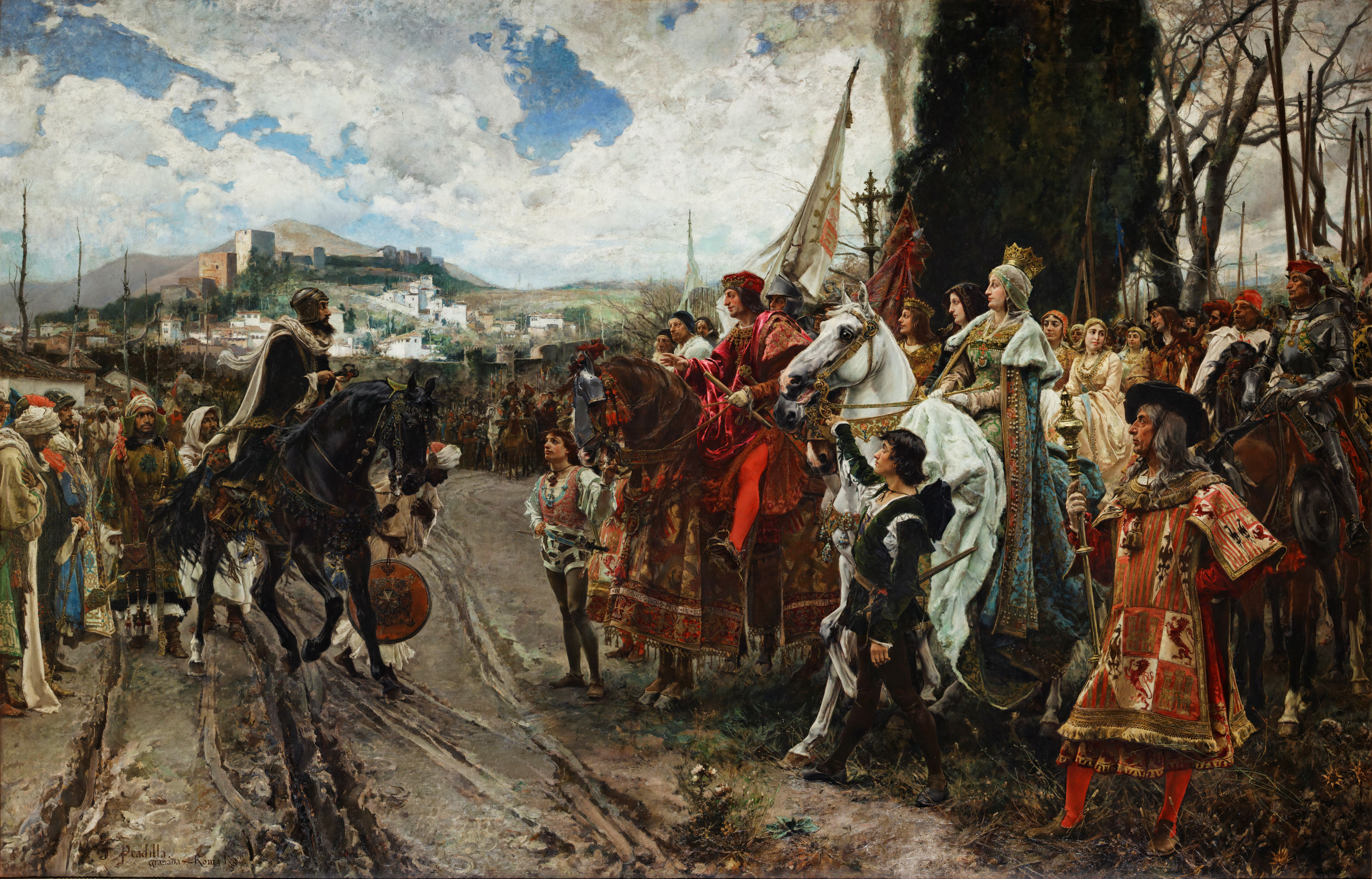
The Surrender of Granada (1492)

- Siege of Hainburg (1482) – Austrian-Hungarian War (1477–1488)
- Siege of Utrecht (1483) – Second Utrecht Civil War
- Siege of Champaner (1483–1484)
- Siege of Vienna (1485) – Austrian-Hungarian War (1477–1488)
- Siege of Retz (1486) – Austrian-Hungarian War (1477–1488)
- Siege of Wiener Neustadt (1487) – Austrian-Hungarian War (1477–1488)
- Siege of Málaga (1487) – Granada War
- Siege of Châteaubriant (1488) – Franco-Breton Wars
- Siege of Fougères (1488) – Franco-Breton Wars
- Siege of Granada (1491–1492)
- Siege of Boulogne (1492)
- Siege of Samarkand (1494)
- Siege of Samarkand (1496)
- Siege of Samarkand (1497)
- Siege of the Castle of Saint George (1500) – Ottoman–Venetian War (1499–1503)

=== 16th century ===
- Siege of Tabriz (1501)
- Siege of Samarkand (1501)
- Siege of Smolensk (1502) – Muscovite–Lithuanian Wars
- Siege of Kabul (1504)
- Capture of Mers-el-Kébir (1505)
- Tenth Siege of Gibraltar (1506) – by the Duke of Medina Sidonia
- Siege of Anjadiva (1506)
- Siege of Cannanore (1507)
- Siege of Viana (1507) – Navarrese suppression of a Beaumont revolt
- Spanish conquest of Oran (1509)
- Siege of Padua (1509) – War of the League of Cambrai
- Siege of Gongenyama (1510)
- Capture of Béjaïa (1510)
- Spanish conquest of Tripoli (1510)
- Portuguese conquest of Goa (1510)
- Siege of Mirandola (1511) – War of the League of Cambrai
- Capture of Malacca (1511)
- Siege of Aden (1513)
- Siege of Dijon (1513) – War of the League of Cambrai
- Siege of Crema (1514)
- Siege of Smolensk (1514) – Muscovite–Lithuanian Wars
- Siege of Arai (1516)
- Siege of Cairo (1517)

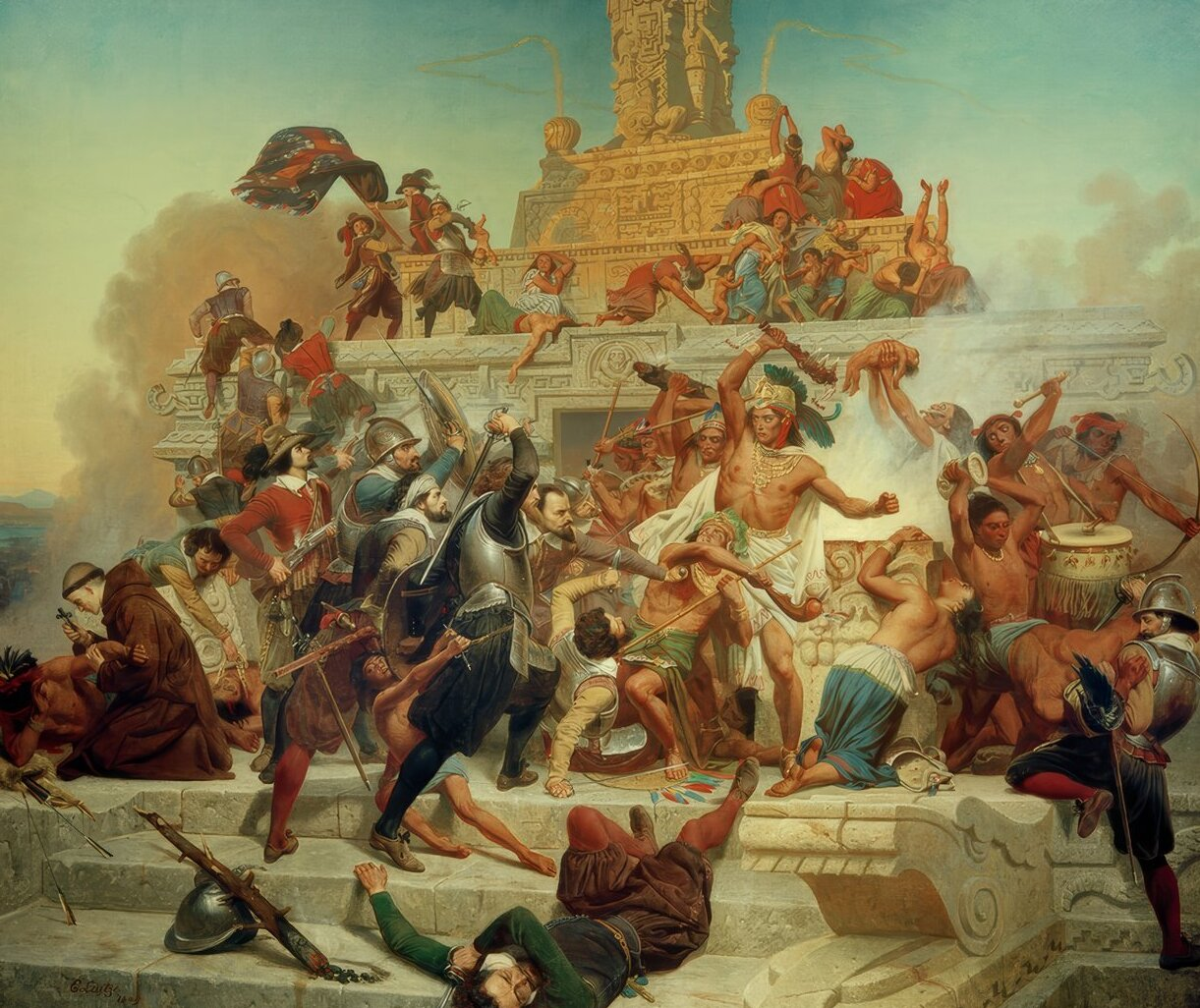
The Storming of the Teocalli by Cortez and His Troops (Emanuel Leutze, 1848)

- Siege of Opochka (1517) – Muscovite–Lithuanian Wars
- Siege of Mandu (1518)
- Siege of Polotsk (1518) – Muscovite–Lithuanian Wars
- Siege of Allenstein (1521) – Polish–Teutonic War (1519–21)
- Siege of Pampeluna (1521) – Italian War of 1521–26
- Siege of Tenochtitlan (1521) – fall of the Aztec Empire.
- Siege of Mézières (1521) – Italian War of 1521–26
- Siege of Tournai (1521) – Italian War of 1521–26
- Siege of Belgrade (1521)
- Siege of Knin (1522)
- Siege of Genoa (1522) – Italian War of 1521–26
- Siege of Rhodes (1522) – second siege of Rhodes
- Siege of Marseille (1522–1524) – Italian War of 1521–26
- Conquest of Kalmar (1523)
- Conquest of Stockholm (1523)
- Siege of Fuenterrabía (1523–1524) – Italian War of 1521–26
- Siege of Edo (1524)

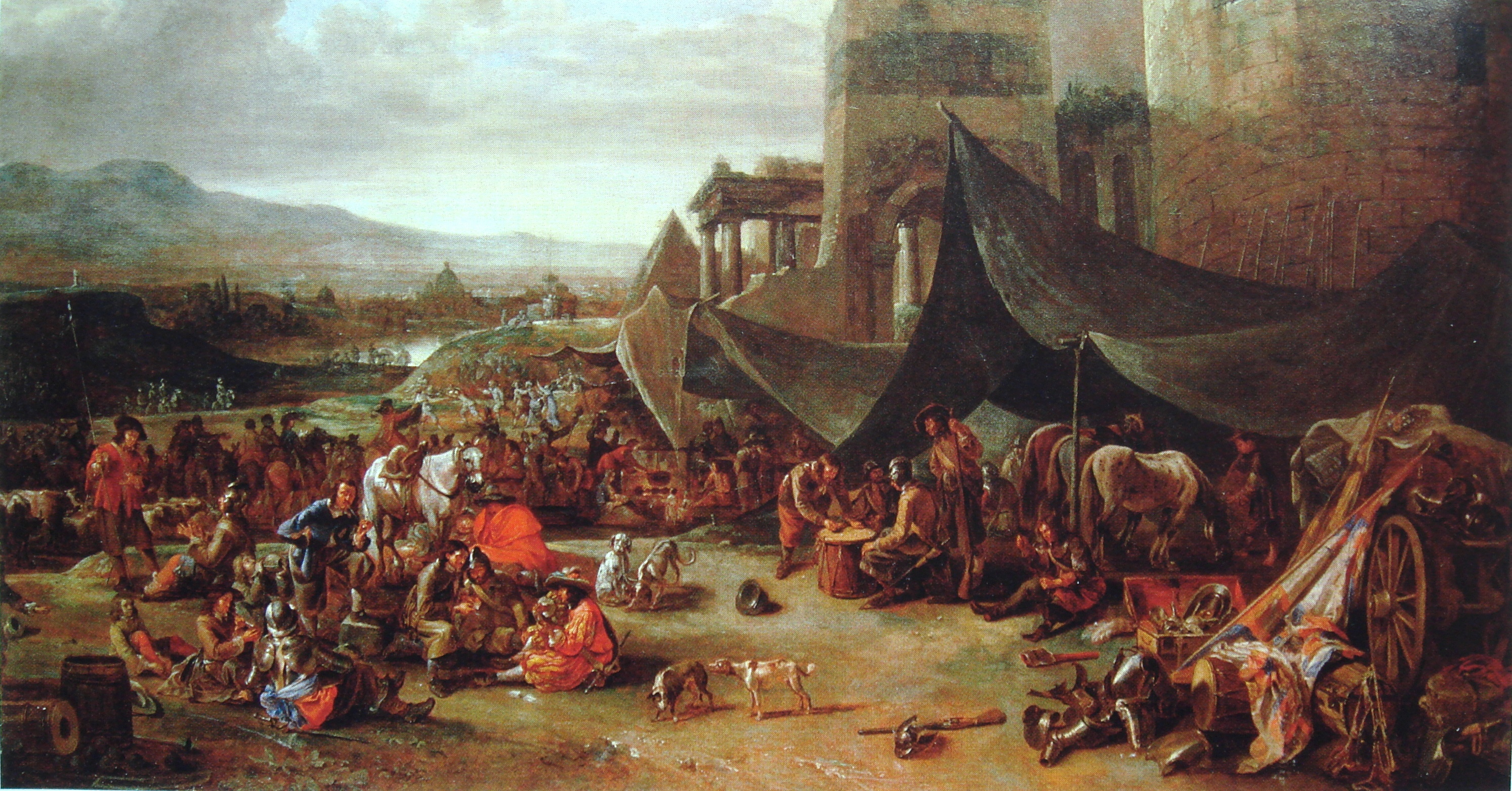
Sack of Rome of 1527 by Johannes Lingelbach, 17th century.

- Siege of Pavia (1524–25) – Italian War of 1521–26
- Siege of Sambhal (1526)
- Siege of Calicut (1526)
- Siege of Kamakura (1526)
- Sack of Rome (1527) – War of the League of Cognac
- Siege of Naples (1528) – War of the League of Cognac
- Capture of Peñón of Algiers (1529)
- Siege of Vienna (1529) – first siege of Vienna
- Siege of Florence (1529–1530) – War of the League of Cognac
- Siege of Buda (1530)
- Siege of Diu (1531)
- Siege of Raisen (1532)
- Siege of Güns (1532)

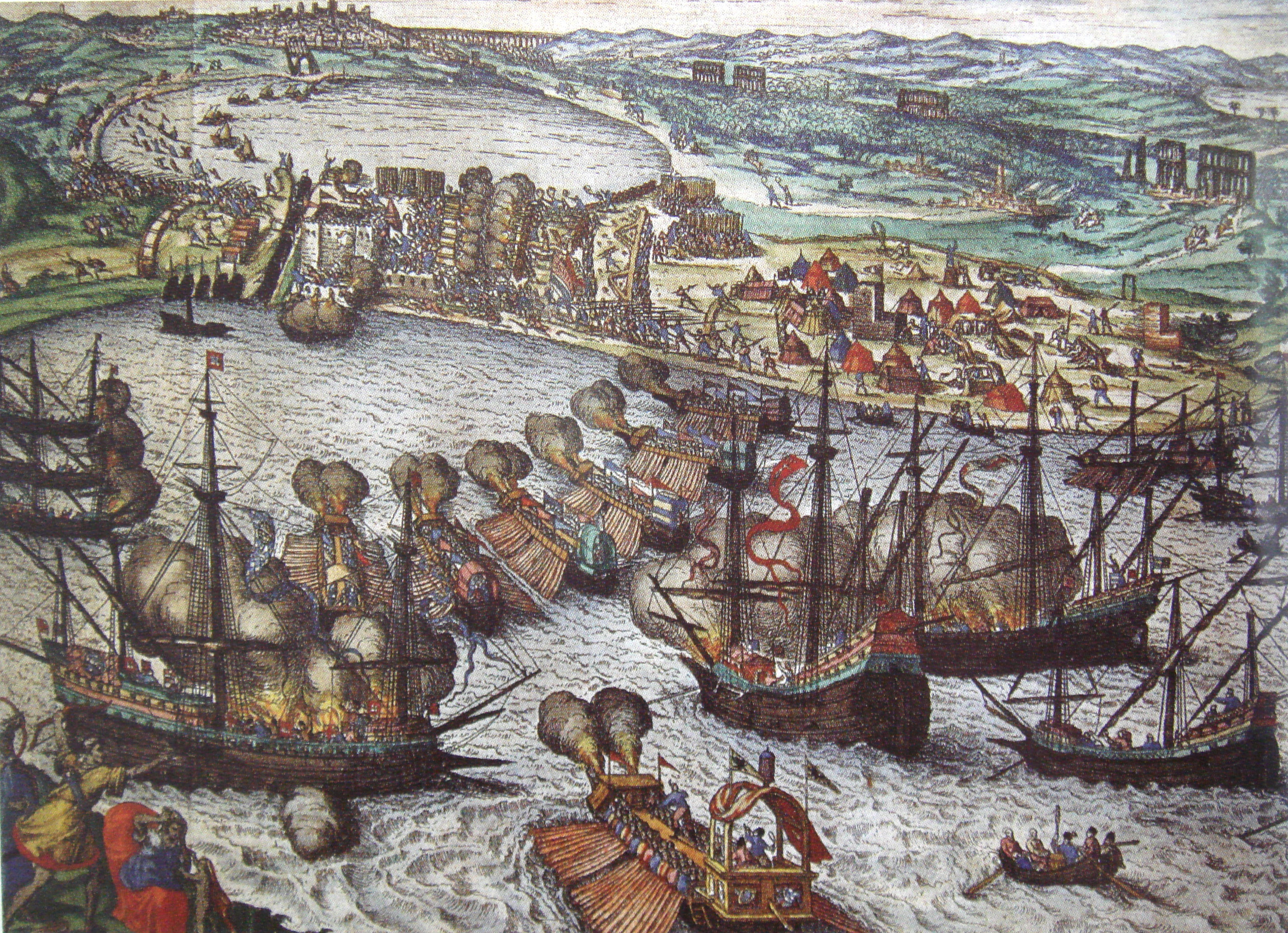
Battle of Tunis 1535 Attack on Goletta. Frans Hogenberg after Jan Cornelisz Vermeyen, 16th century.

- Siege of Maribor (1532)
- Siege of Coron (1532–1534)
- Siege of Baghdad (1534) – by Ottomans
- Siege of Tunis (1534)
- Conquest of Tunis (1535)
- Siege of Chittorgarh (1535)
- Siege of Buenos Aires (1536}
- Siege of Cusco (1536–1537)
- Siege of Klis (1536–1537)
- Siege of Musashi-Matsuyama (1537)
- Siege of Corfu (1537) – Ottoman–Venetian War (1537–1540)
- Siege of Diu (1538)
- Siege of Castelnuovo (1539) – Ottoman–Venetian War (1537–1540)
- Siege of Yoshida-Kōriyama Castle (1540–1541)
- Siege of Buda (1540) by Leonhard von Fels and Niklas Salm
- Fall of Agadir (1541)
- Siege of Buda (1541) – capture of the city of Buda by the Turkish Ottoman Emperor Suleiman the Magnificent, as he invaded central Hungary
- Algiers expedition (1541)
- Siege of Uehara (1541)
- Siege of Fukuyo (1542)
- Siege of Kuwabara (1542)
- Siege of Pest (1542) – an attempt to recapture Buda from the Turks
- Siege of Copenhagen (1535–1536) – Count's Feud of 1534–1536
- Siege of Perpignan (1542) – Italian War of 1542–1546
- Siege of Toda Castle (1542–1543)
- Siege of Nagakubo (1543)
- Siege of Landrecies (1543) – Italian War of 1542–1546
- Siege of Esztergom (1543)
- Siege of Nice (1543) – Italian War of 1542–1546
- Siege of Kojinyama (1544)
- Siege of Kōriyama Castle (1544)
- Siege of St. Dizier (1544) – Italian War of 1542–46
- Sieges of Boulogne (1544–46) – Italian War of 1542–46
- Siege of Ryūgasaki (1545)
- Siege of Takatō (1545)
- Siege of Kawagoe Castle (1545–1546)
- Second siege of Diu (1546)
- Siege of Uchiyama (1546)
- Siege of Shika Castle (1546–1547)
- Siege of Van (1548) – Ottoman–Safavid War (1532–55)
- Siege of Aden (1548)
- Siege of Kajiki (1549)
- Siege of Fukashi (1549)

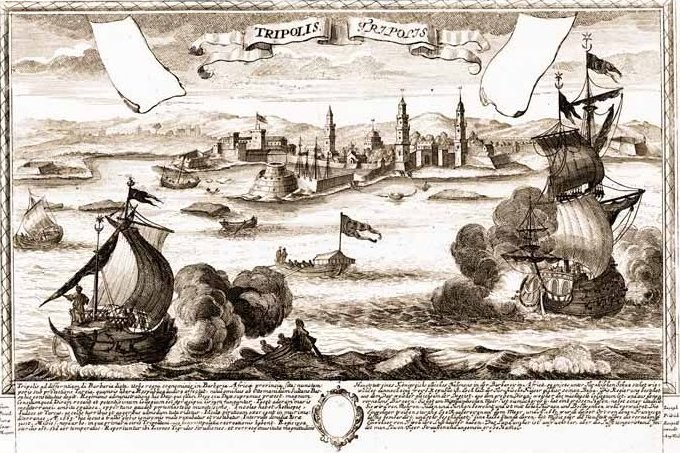
Attack on Tripoli by the Ottomans (1551)

- Siege of Beijing (1550)
- Capture of Mahdia (1550)
- Sieges of Toishi (1550–51)
- Siege of Gozo (1551)
- Siege of Mirandola (1551–1552) – Italian War of 1551–1559
- Siege of Tripoli (1551)
- Siege of Eger (1552)
- Siege of Temesvár (1552)
- Siege of Muscat (1552)
- Siege of Metz (1552–53) – Italian War of 1551–1559
- Siege of Kazan (1552) – part of the Russo-Kazan wars
- Siege of Hormuz (1552–54)
- Siege of Eger (1552) – part of Ottoman–Habsburg wars
- Siege of Katsurao (1553)
- Siege of Iwatsurugi Castle (1554)

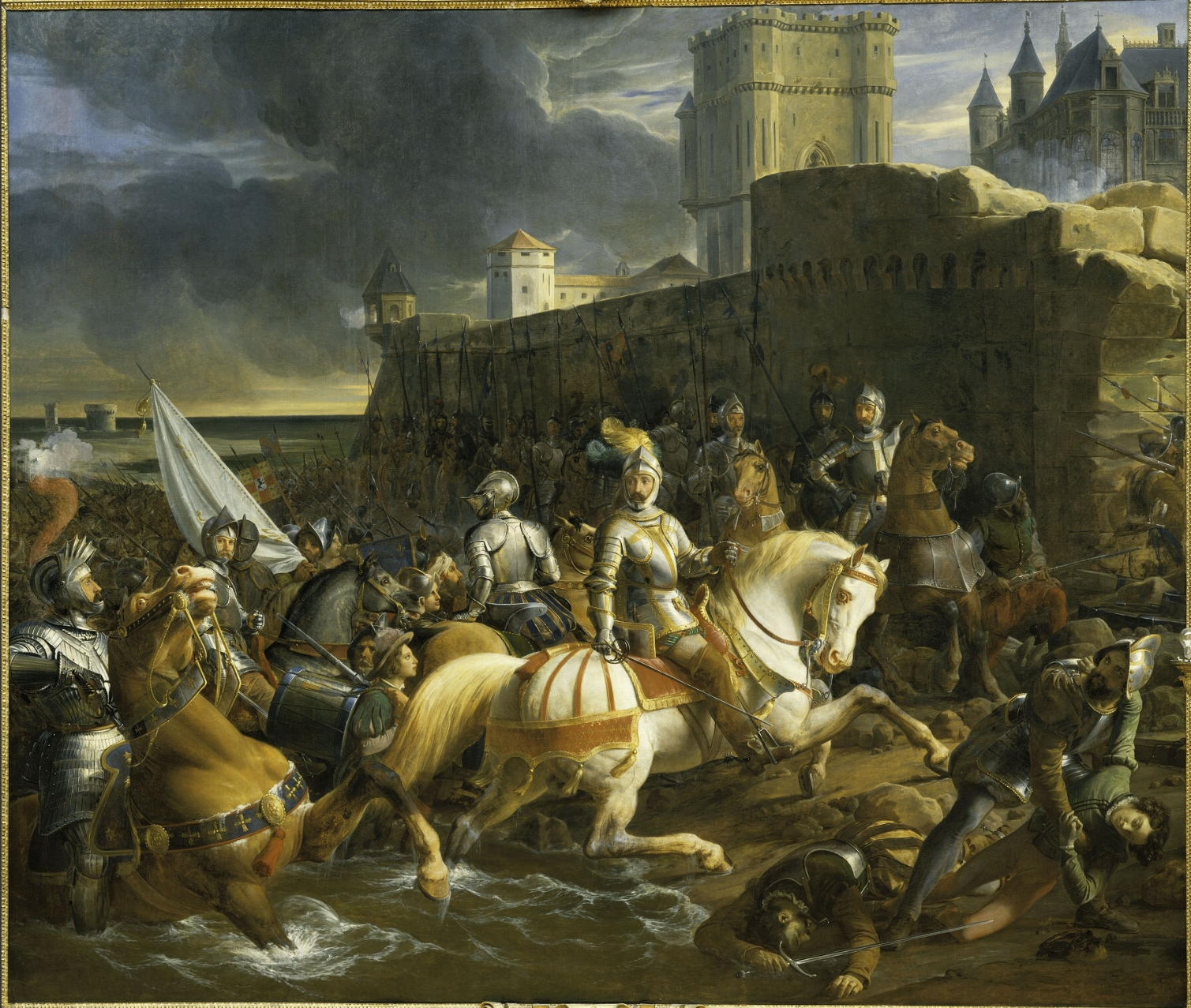
The Siege of Calais, by François-Édouard Picot, 1838

- Siege of Kiso Fukushima (1554)
- Siege of Kannomine (1554)
- Siege of Matsuo (1554)
- Siege of Siena (1554–55) – Italian War of 1551–1559
- Siege of Oran (1556)
- Siege of Katsurayama (1557)
- Siege of Kotte (1557–58) – Sinhalese–Portuguese War
- Siege of Calais (1558) – Italian War of 1551–1559
- Siege of Narva (1558) – Livonian War
- Siege of Thionville (1558) – Italian War of 1551–1559
- Siege of Bahrain (1559)
- Siege of Dorpat (1558) – Livonian War
- Siege of Weissenstein (1558) – Livonian War
- Siege of Dorpat (1559) – Livonian War
- Siege of Lais (1559) – Livonian War
- Siege of Fellin (1560) – Livonian War
- Siege of Weissenstein (1560) – Livonian War
- Siege of Leith (1560)
- Siege of Marune (1560)
- Siege of Moji (1561)
- Siege of Odawara (1561)
- Siege of Kaminogō Castle (1562)
- Siege of Inverness (1562)
- Siege of Rouen (1562) – French Wars of Religion
- Siege of Weissenstein (1562) – Livonian War
- Siege of Musashi-Matsuyama (1563)
- Siege of Orleans (1563) – French Wars of Religion

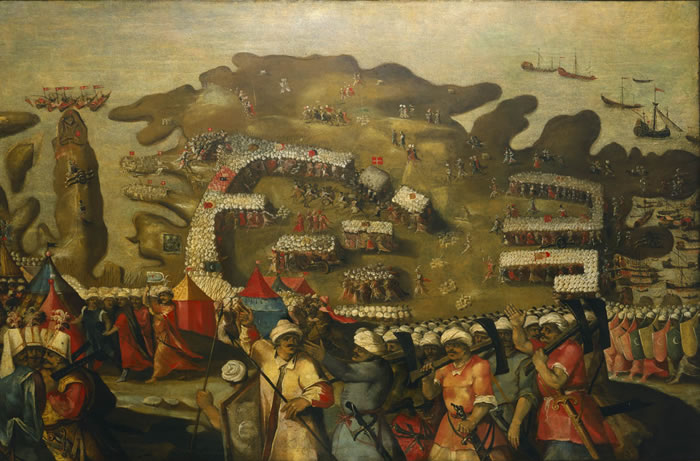
The siege of Malta—Arrival of the Turkish fleet (1565) by Matteo Pérez de Alesio, 16th century

- Sieges of Oran and Mers El Kébir (1563)
- Capture of Älvsborg – Northern Seven Years' War
- Siege of Concepción (1564)
- Siege of Chauragarh (1564)
- Siege of Peñón de Vélez de la Gomera (1564)
- Siege of Kuragano (1565)
- Great Siege of Malta (1565)
- Siege of Minowa (1566)
- Siege of Szigetvár (1566) – Ottoman siege during which Suleiman the Magnificent died
- Siege of Valenciennes (1566–67) – Eighty Years' War
- Siege of Inabayama Castle (1567)
- Siege of Chittorgarh (1567–68)
- Siege of Ranthambore (1568)
- Siege of Chartres (1568)
- Siege of Malacca (1568)
- Siege of Hachigata (1568)
- Siege of Odawara (1569)
- Siege of Kanbara (1569)
- Siege of Kakegawa (1569)
- Siege of Tachibana (1569)
- Siege of Varberg (1569) – Northern Seven Years' War
- Siege of Ogucji Castle (1569)
- Siege of Hanazawa (1570)
- Siege of Chōkō-ji (1570)
- Siege of Kanegasaki (1570)
- Siege of Nicosia, Cyprus (1570) – Fourth Ottoman–Venetian War
- Siege of Famagusta, Cyprus (1570–71) – fourth Ottoman–Venetian War
- Siege of Reval (1570–71) – Livonian War
- Siege of Weissenstein (1570–71) – Livonian War
- Siege of Ishiyama Honganji (1570–1580) – longest siege in Japanese history
- Siege of Chale (1571) – War of the League of the Indies
- Siege of Fukazawa (1571)
- Siege of Moscow (1571) – part of Russo-Crimean Wars
- Sieges of Nagashima (1571, 1573, 1574)
- Siege of Mount Hiei (1571)
- Siege of Futamata (1572)
- Siege of Iwamura Castle (1572)
- Siege of Mons (1572) – Eighty Years' War
- Siege of Middelburg (1572–74) – Eighty Years' War
- Siege of La Rochelle (1572–1573), assault on the Huguenot city of La Rochelle during the French Wars of Religion.
- Siege of Sancerre (1572–1573) – French Wars of Religion
- Siege of Haarlem (1572–1573) – conducted by the Spanish against the Dutch during the Eighty Years' War
- Siege of Weissenstein (1572–73) – Livonian War
- Siege of Buenos Aires (1573)
- Siege of Noda Castle (1573)
- Siege of Odani Castle (1573)
- Siege of Hikida Castle (1573)
- Siege of Ichijōdani Castle (1573)
- Siege of Alkmaar (1573) – turning point in the Eighty Years' War
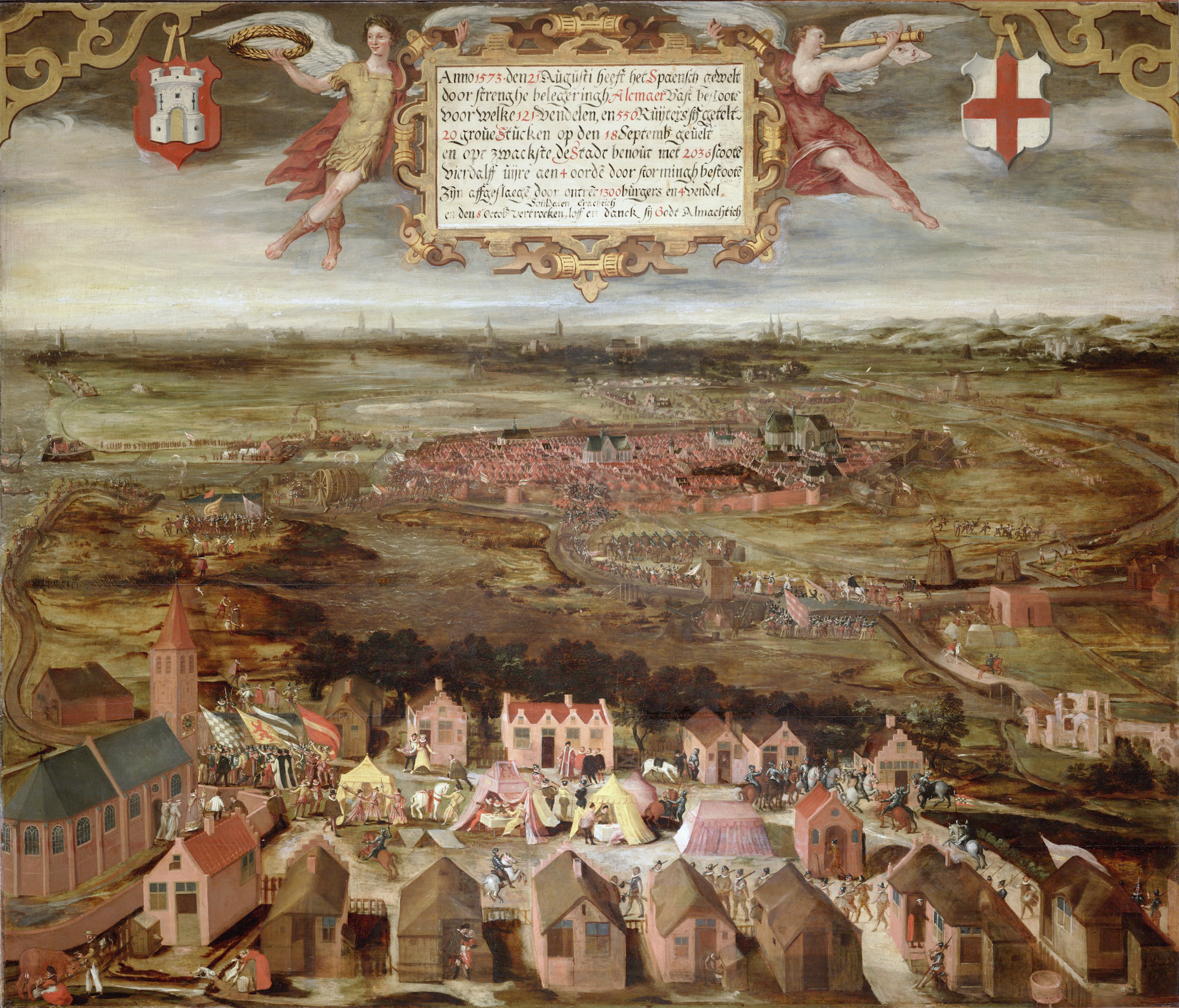
  Siege of Alkmaar during the Eighty Years' War, 1573
- Siege of Leiden (1573–1574) – Eighty Years' War
- Siege of Wesenberg (1574) – Livonian War
- Siege of Itami (1574)
- Siege of Takatenjin (1574)
- Siege of Tunis (1574)
- Siege of Limahong (1574)
- Siege of Yoshida Castle (1575)
- Siege of Nagashino (1575)
- Siege of Schoonhoven (1575) – Eighty Years' War
- Siege of Zierikzee (1575–1576)) – Eighty Years' War
- Siege of Mitsuji (1576)
- Siege of Takabaru (1576)
- Siege of Antwerp (1576) – during the Eighty Years' War
- Siege of Nanao (1577)
- Siege of Shigisan (1577)
- Siege of Reval (1577) – Livonian War

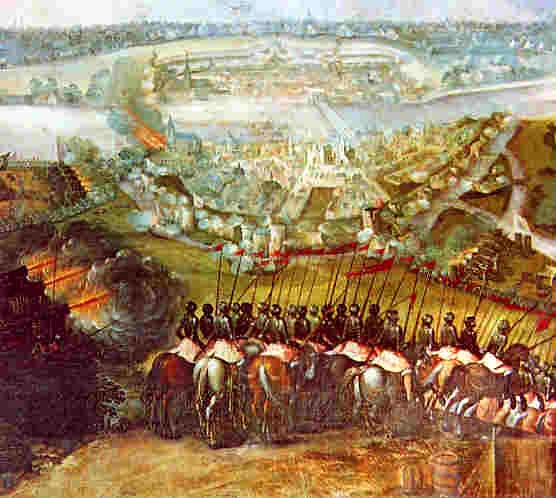
Spanish troops storming the city of Maastricht, 1579

- Siege of Danzig (1577) – Danzig rebellion
- Siege of Gvozdansko (1577–1578)
- Siege of Kōzuki Castle (1578)
- Siege of Otate (1578)
- Siege of Deventer (1578) – Eighty Years' War
- Siege of Miki (1578–1580)
- Siege of Itami (1579)
- Siege of Maastricht (1579) – Eighty Years' War
- Siege of Polotsk (1579) – Livonian War
- Siege of Velikiye Luki – Livonian War
- Siege of Carrigafoyle Castle (1580) – Second Desmond Rebellion
- Siege of Steenwijk (1580–1581) – Eighty Years' War
- Siege of Smerwick (1580) – second Desmond Rebellion
- Siege of Takatenjin (1580–1581)
- Siege of Hijiyama (1581)
- Siege of Tottori (1581)
- Siege of Minamata Castle (1581)
- Siege of Narva (1581) – Livonian War
- Siege of Weissenstein (1581) – Livonian War
- Siege of Pskov (1581–1582) – Livonian War
- Siege of Niezijl (1581) – Eighty Years' War

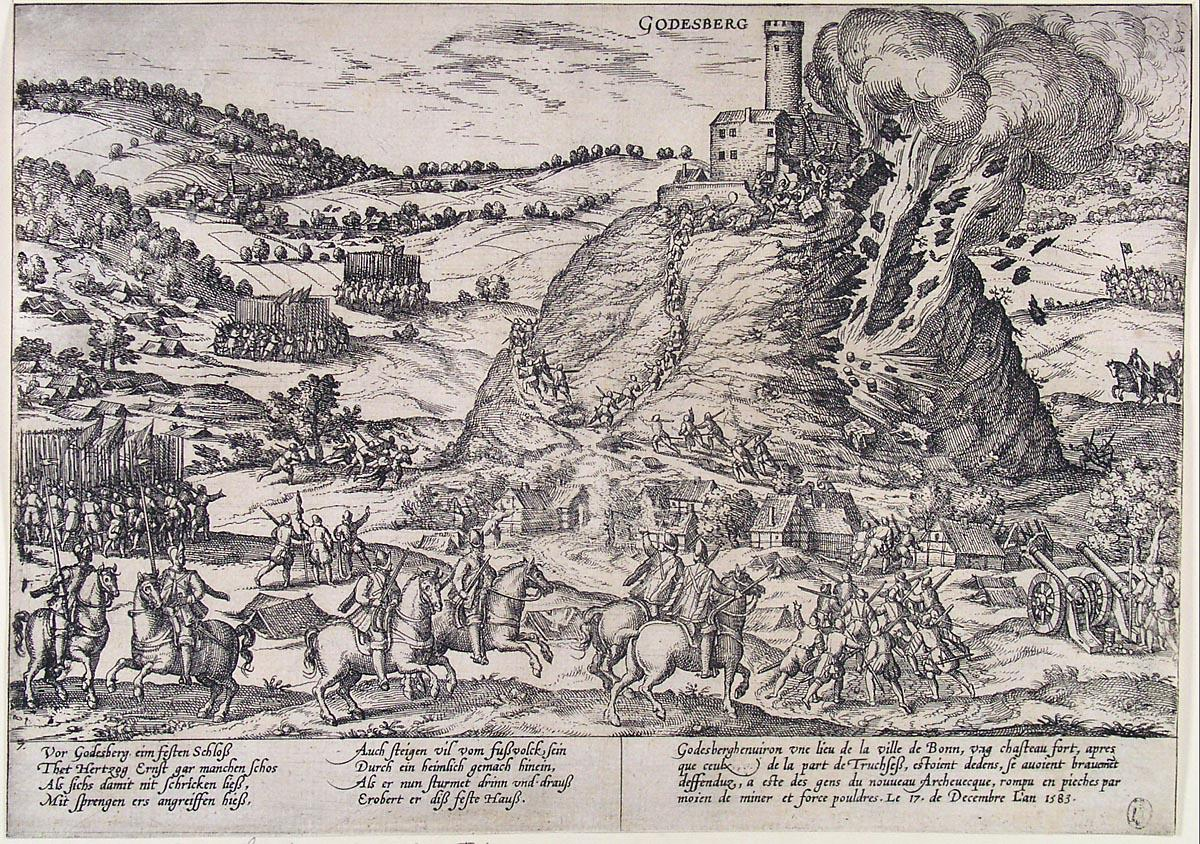
During the Cologne War (1583–89), Ferdinand of Bavaria successfully besieged the medieval fortress of Godesberg; during a month-long siege, his sappers dug tunnels under the feldspar of the mountain and laid gunpowder and a 1500-pound bomb. The result was a spectacular explosion that sent chunks of the ramparts, the walls, the gates, and drawbridges into the air. His 500 men still could not take the fortress until they scaled the interior latrine system and climbed the mountain to enter through a hole in the chapel roof.

- Siege of Takamatsu (1582)
- Siege of Takatō (1582)
- Siege of Uozu (1582)
- Siege of Lochem (1582) – Eighty Years' War
- Siege of Lier (1582) – Eighty Years' War
- Siege of Eindhoven (1583) – Eighty Years' War
- Siege of Godesberg (1583)
- Siege of Kaganoi (1584)
- Siege of Takehana (1584)
- Siege of Kanie (1584)
- Siege of Suemori (1584)
- Siege of Ypres (1584) – Eighty Years' War
- Siege of Ghent (1584) – Eighty Years' War
- Siege of Antwerp (1584–1585) – Eighty Years' War
- Siege of Bruges (1584) – Eighty Years' War
- Siege of Brussels (1584–85) – Eighty Years' War
- Siege of Toyama (1585)
- Siege of Negoro-ji (1585)
- Siege of Ōta Castle (1585)
- Siege of IJsseloord (1585) – Eighty Years' War
- Siege of Iwaya Castle (1586)
- Siege of Cartagena de Indias (1586) during the Anglo–Spanish War
- Siege of Grave (1586) – Eighty Years' War
- Siege of Venlo (1586) – Eighty Years' War
- Siege of Axel (1586) – Eighty Years' War
- Second siege of Neuss (July 1586)
- Siege of Rheinberg (1586–1590) – Eighty Years' War
- Siege of Ganjaku (1587)
- Siege of Akizuki (1587)
- Siege of Kagoshima (1587)
- Siege of Sluis (1587) – Eighty Years' War
- Siege of Johor (1587)
- Siege of Kraków (1587) – War of the Polish Succession (1587–88)
- Siege of Bergen op Zoom (1588) – Eighty Years' War
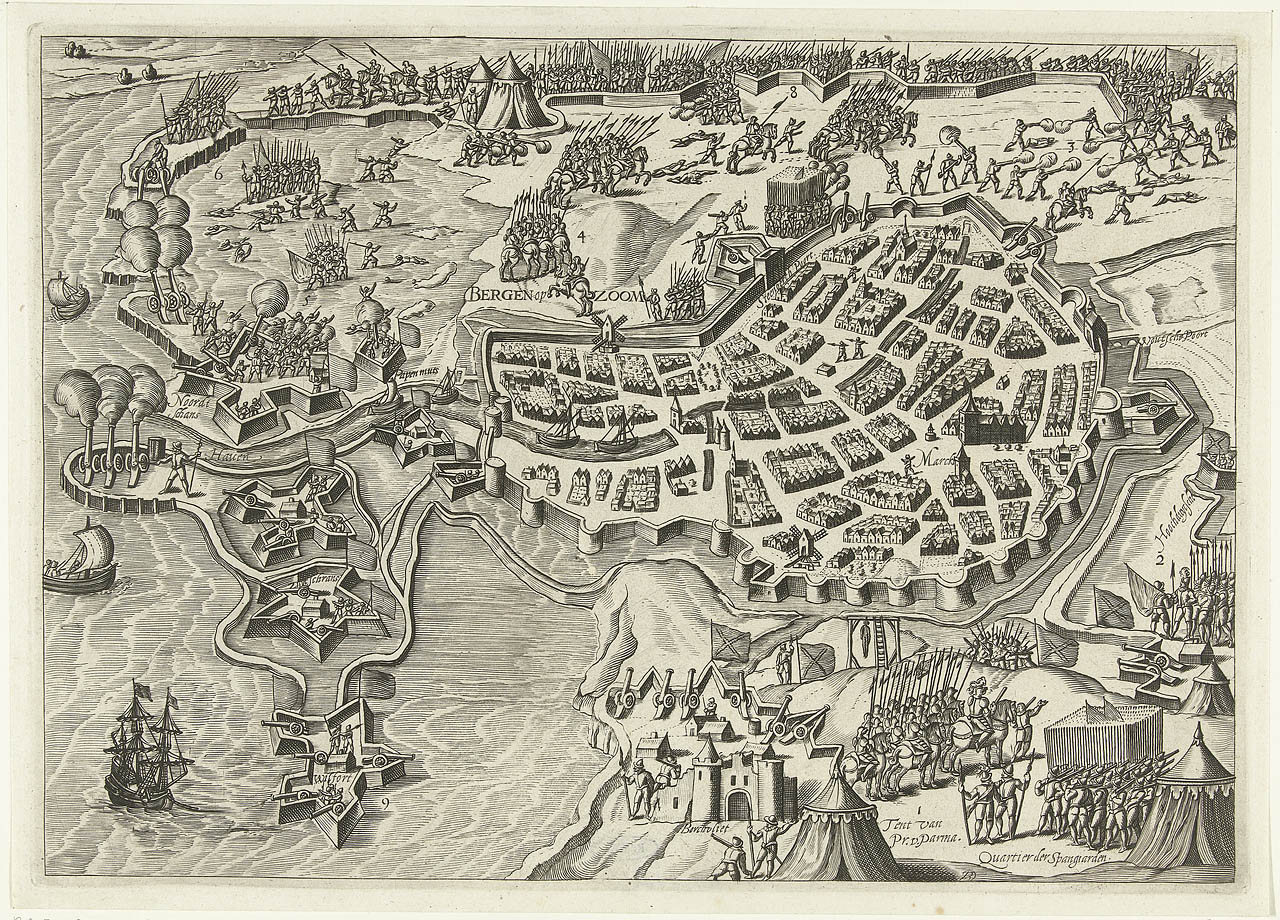
  Siege of Bergen op Zoom by the Duke of Parma, 1588
- Siege of Coruña (1589)
- Siege of Kurokawa Castle (1589)
- Siege of Hachigata (1590)
- Siege of Paris (1590) – French Wars of Religion
- Siege of Odawara Castle (1590)
- Siege of Shimoda (1590)
- Siege of Oshi (1590)
- Siege of Zutphen (1591) – Eighty Years' War
- Siege of Deventer (1591) – Eighty Years' War
- Siege of Knodsenburg (1591) – Eighty Years' War
- Siege of Hulst (1591) – Eighty Years' War
- Siege of Nijmegen (1591) – Eighty Years' War
- Siege of Rouen (1591–1592) – French Wars of Religion
- Siege of Caudebec (1592) – French Wars of Religion
- Siege of Busanjin (1592) – Japanese invasions of Korea (1592–98)
- Siege of Dongrae (1592) – Japanese invasions of Korea (1592–98)
- Siege of Steenwijk (1592) – Eighty Years' War
- Siege of Bihać (1592) – Eighty Years' War
- Siege of Pyongyang (1592) – Japanese invasions of Korea (1592–98)
- Siege of Coevorden (1592) – Eighty Years' War
- Siege of Jinju (1592) – Japanese invasions of Korea (1592–98)
- Siege of Pyongyang (1593) – Japanese invasions of Korea (1592–98)
- Siege of Haengju (1593) – Japanese invasions of Korea (1592–98)
- Siege of Geertruidenberg (1593) – Eighty Years' War
- Siege of Sisak (1593) – Long Turkish War
- Siege of Jinju (1593) – Japanese invasions of Korea (1592–98)
- Siege of Coevorden (1593–1594) – Eighty Years' War
- Siege of Groningen (1594) – Eighty Years' War
- Siege of Longvek (1594) - Siamese-Cambodian War (1591-94)
- Siege of Enniskillen (1594) – Tyrone's Rebellion
- Siege of Morlaix (1594) – French Wars of Religion
- Siege of Fort Crozon (1594) – Anglo-Spanish War (1585–1604)
- Siege of Huy (1595) – Eighty Years' War
- Siege of Caracas (1595) during the Anglo–Spanish War

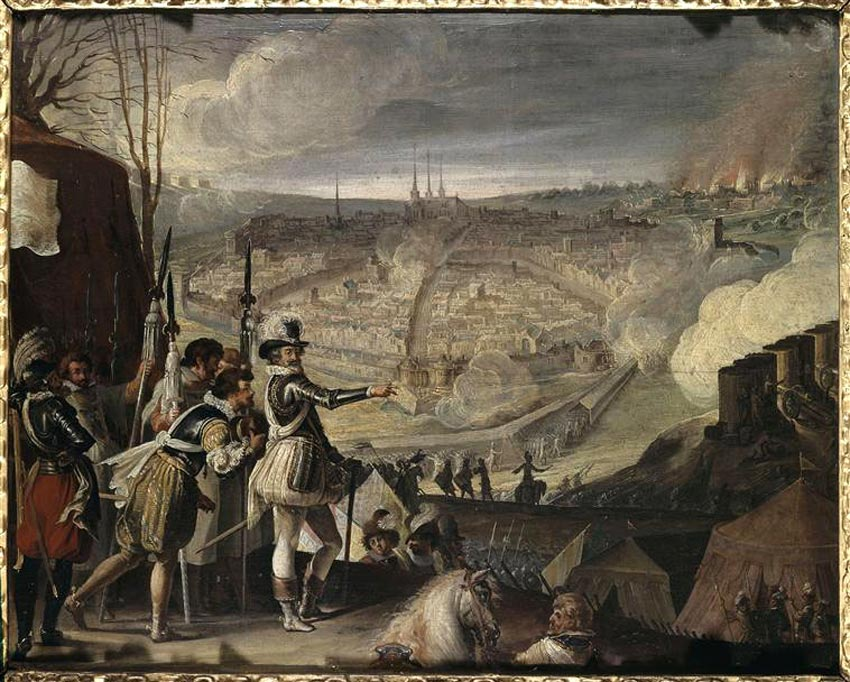
Henry IV of France before Amiens (1597), Anonymous

- Siege of Le Catelet (1595) – French Wars of Religion
- Siege of Groenlo (1595) – Eighty Years' War
- Siege of Doullens – French Wars of Religion
- Siege of Esztergom (1595) – Long Turkish War
- Siege of San Juan (1595) during the Anglo–Spanish War
- Siege of Calais (1596) – French Wars of Religion
- Siege of Hulst (1596) – Eighty Years' War
- Siege of Eger (1596) – Long Turkish War
- Siege of Amiens (1597) – French Wars of Religion
- Siege of Rheinberg (1597) – Eighty Years' War
- Siege of Meurs (1597) – Eighty Years' War
- Siege of Groenlo (1597) – during the Eighty Years' War
- Siege of Namwon (1597) – Japanese invasions of Korea (1592–98)
- Siege of Bredevoort (1597) – Eighty Years' War

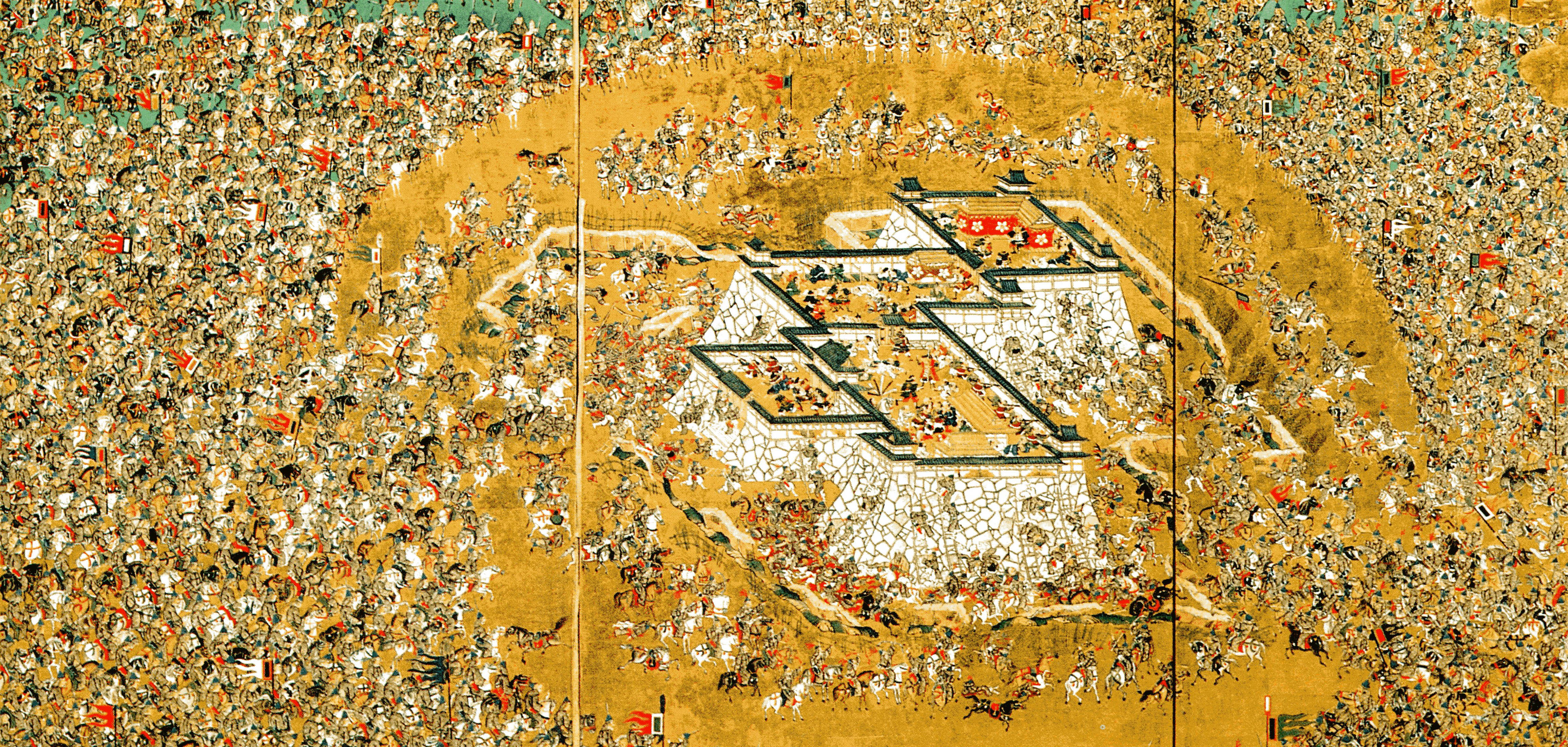
Joseon and Ming dynasty soldiers assault the Japanese-built fortress at Ulsan (1598)

- Siege of Enschede (1597) – Eighty Years' War
- Siege of Ootmarsum (1597) – Eighty Years' War
- Siege of Oldenzaal (1597) – Eighty Years' War
- Siege of Lingen (1597) – Eighty Years' War
- Siege of Buda (1598)
- Siege of Ulsan (1598) – Japanese invasions of Korea (1592–98)
- Second siege of Ulsan (1598) – Japanese invasions of Korea (1592–98)
- Siege of Suncheon (1598) – Japanese invasions of Korea (1592–98)
- Siege of Sacheon (1598) – Japanese invasions of Korea (1592–98)
- Siege of Schenckenschans (1599) – Eighty Years' War

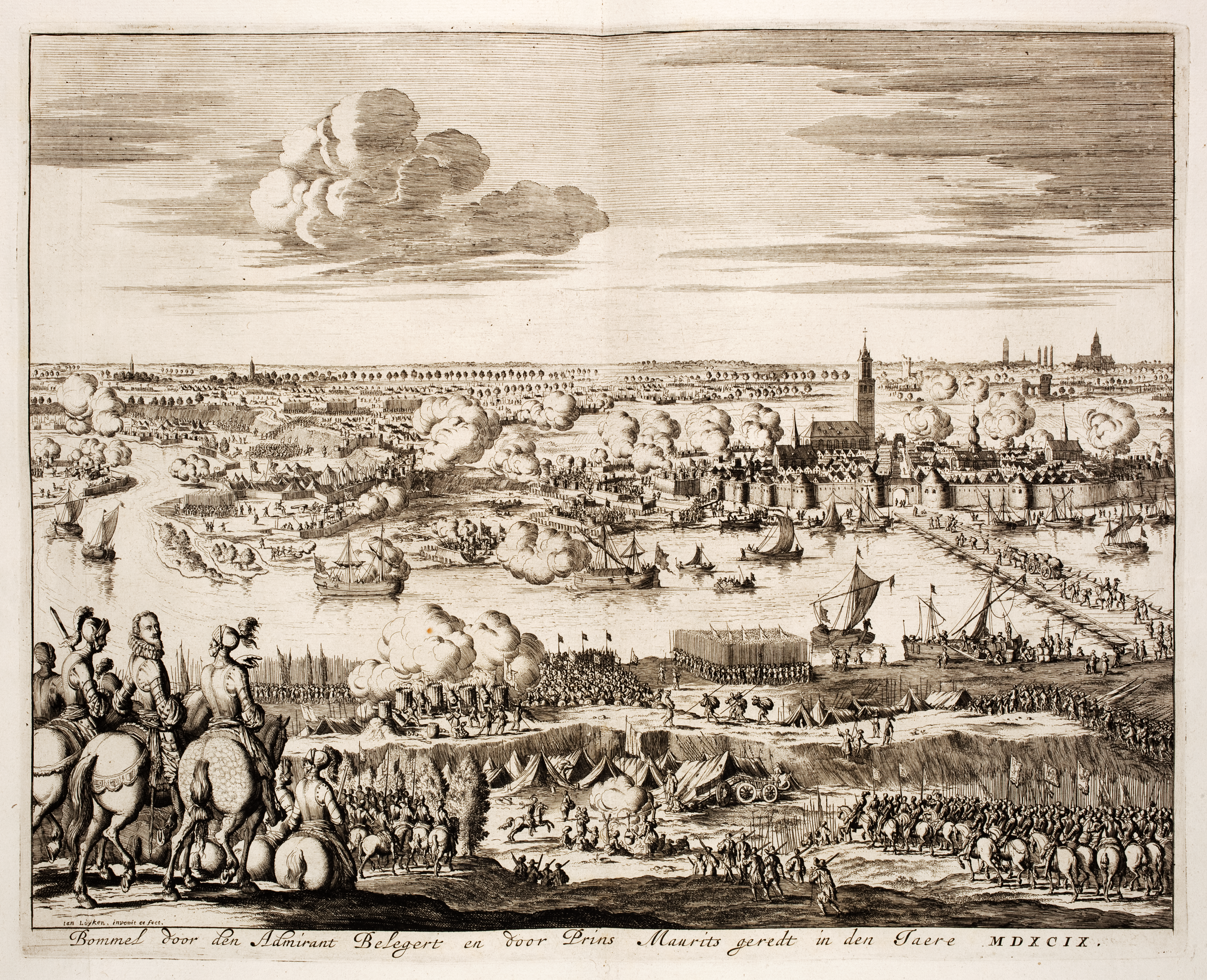
Siege of Zaltbommel by the Spanish in 1599 by Hugo Grotius

- Siege of Zaltbommel (1599) – Eighty Years' War
- Siege of Cahir Castle (1599) – Nine Years' War (Ireland)
- Siege of Rees (1599) – Eighty Years' War
- Siege of Tanabe (1600)
- Siege of Udo (1600)
- Siege of Yanagawa (1600)
- Siege of Pernau (1600) – Polish–Swedish War (1600–11)
- Siege of Fellin (1600) – Polish–Swedish War (1600–11)
- Siege of Dorpat (1600) – Polish–Swedish War (1600–11)
- Siege of San Andreas (1600) – Eighty Years' War
- Siege of Ueda (1600)
- Siege of Fushimi (1600)
- Siege of Ōtsu (1600)
- Siege of Shiroishi (1600)
- Siege of Hataya (1600)
- Siege of Kaminoyama (1600)
- Siege of Hasedō (1600)

=== 17th century ===
- Siege of Rheinberg (1601) – Eighty Years' War

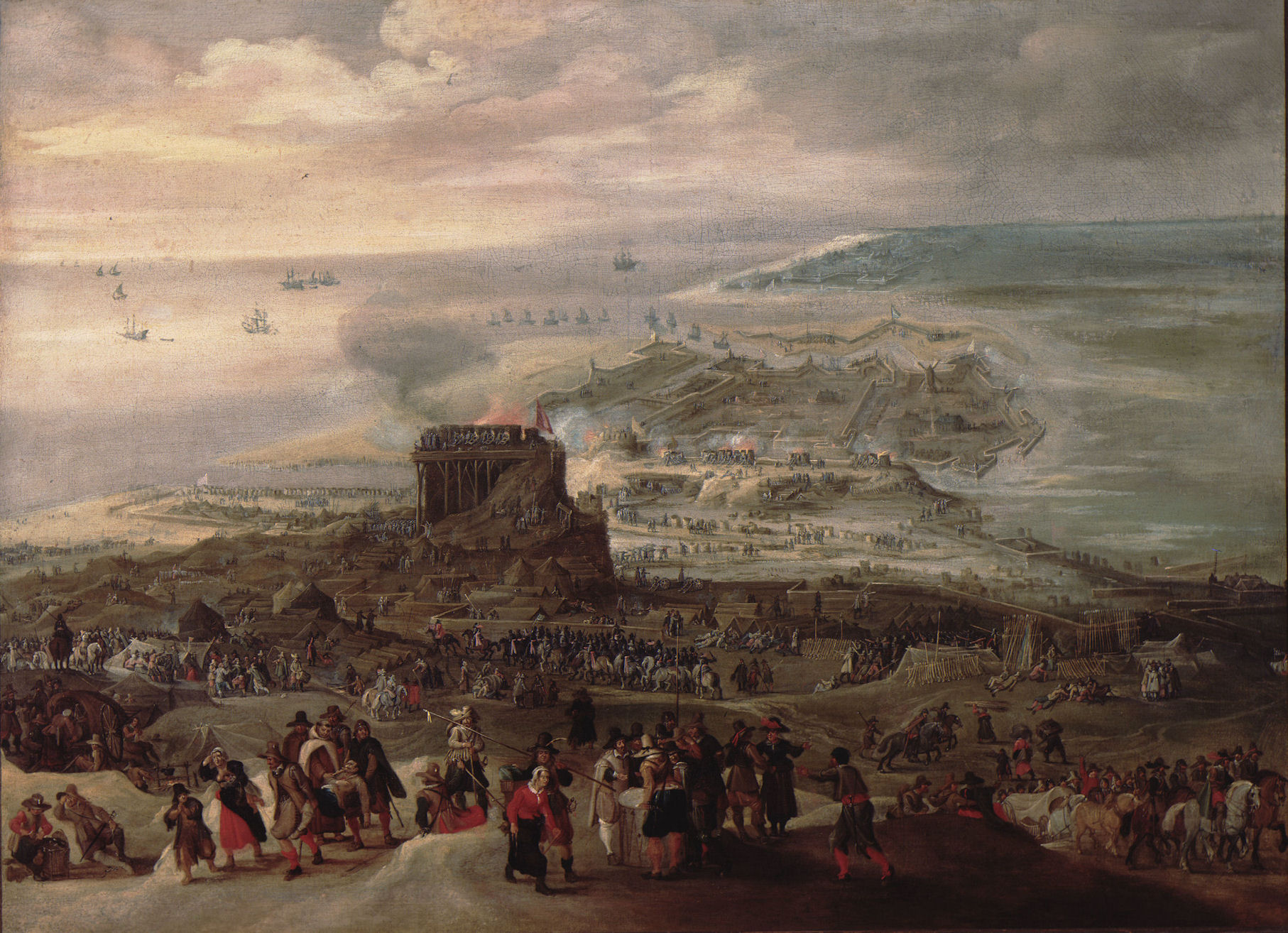
Siege of Ostend (1601-4) by Peter Snayers, oil on canvas.

- Siege of Ostend (1601–04) – Eighty Years' War
- Siege of Nagykanizsa (1601) – Long Turkish War
- Siege of Donegal (1601) – Nine Years' War (Ireland)
- Siege of Kinsale (1601–02) – Nine Years' War (Ireland)
- Siege of Wolmar (1601) – Polish–Swedish War (1600–11)
- Siege of 's-Hertogenbosch (1601) – Eighty Years' War
- Siege of Fellin (1602) – Polish–Swedish War (1600–11)
- Siege of Weissenstein (1602) – Polish–Swedish War (1600–11)
- Siege of Dunboy (1602) – Nine Years' War (Ireland)
- Siege of Grave (1602) – Eighty Years' War
- Siege of Buda (1602–1603) – Long Turkish War
- Siege of Sluis (1604) – Eighty Years' War
- Siege of Weissenstein (1604) – Polish–Swedish War (1600–11)
- Siege of Kromy (1605) – Polish–Muscovite War (1605–18)
- Siege of Lingen (1605) – Eighty Years' War
- Siege of Kandahar (1605–06)

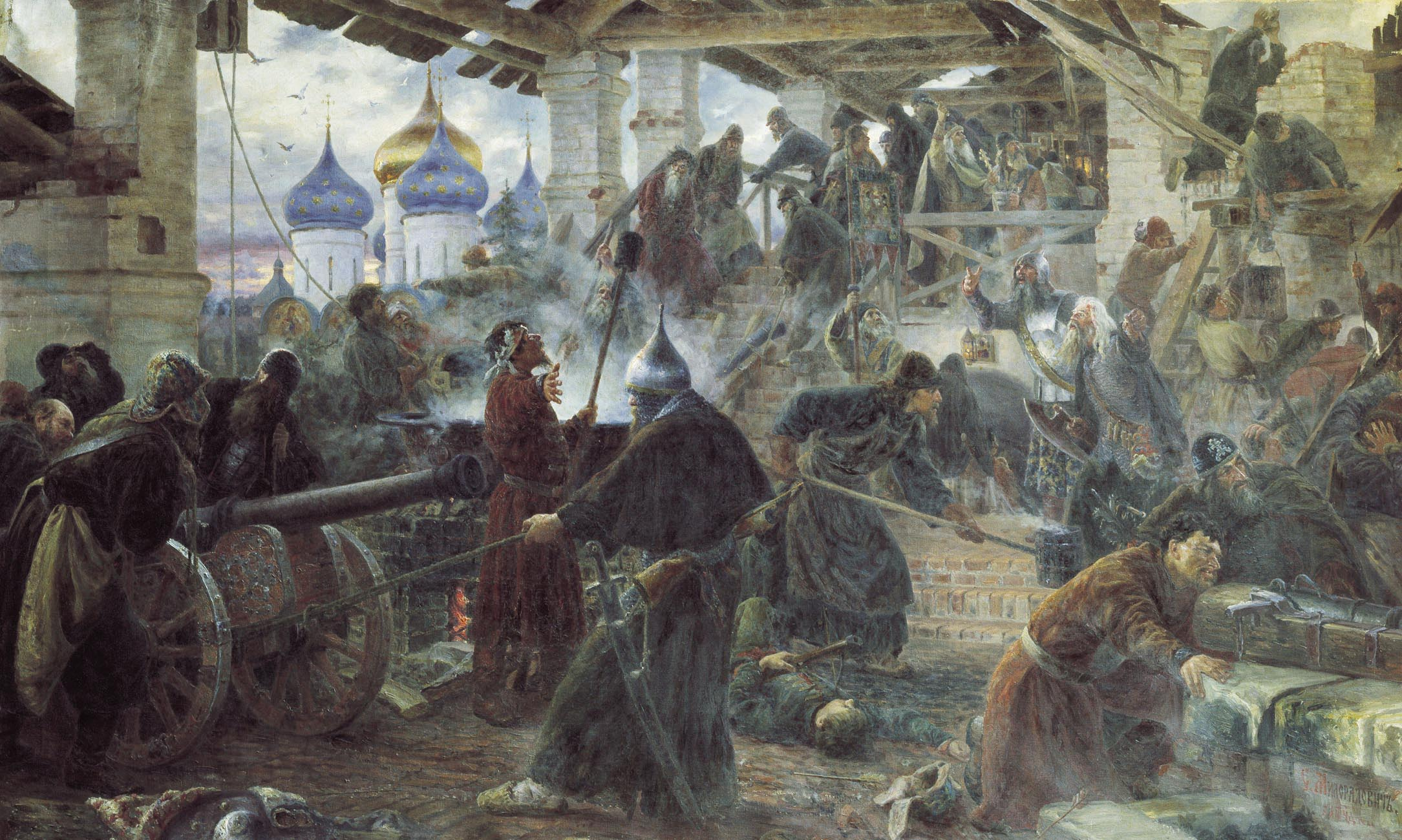
Monks successfully defended the Troitse-Sergiyeva Lavra against the Poles from September 1609 to January 1611.

- Siege of Malacca (1606) – Dutch-Portuguese War
- Siege of Ganja (1606) – Ottoman–Safavid War (1603–18)
- Siege of Groenlo (1606) – Eighty Years' War
- Siege of Tory Island (1608) – O'Doherty's rebellion
- Siege of Troitse-Sergiyeva Lavra (1608–10) – Polish–Muscovite War (1605–1618)
- Siege of Fellin (1600) – Polish–Swedish War (1600–11)
- Siege of Weissenstein (1608) – Polish–Swedish War (1600–11)
- Siege of Pärnu (1609) – Polish–Swedish War (1600–11)
- Siege of Smolensk (1609–11) – Polish–Muscovite War (1605–1618)
- Siege of Kalmar (1611) – Kalmar War
- Storming of Kristianopel (1611) – Kalmar War
- Siege of Moscow (1612) – Polish–Muscovite War (1605–1618)
- Siege of Smolensk (1613–17) – Polish–Muscovite War (1605–1618)

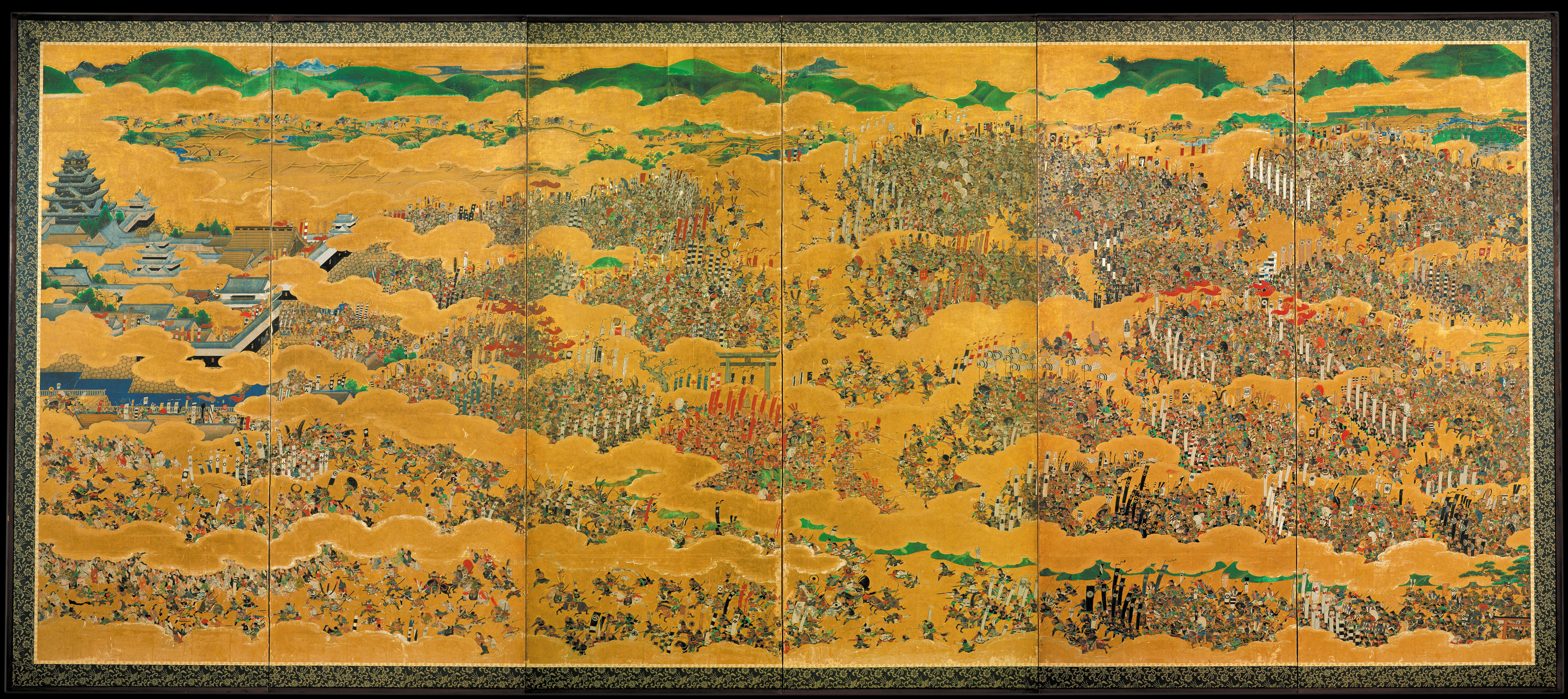
The Summer Battle of Osaka Castle (1614–15), 17th century Japanese painting

- Siege of Tikhvin (1613) – Ingrian War
- Siege of Gdov (1614) – Ingrian War
- Siege of Aachen (1614) – Eighty Years' War
- Siege of Osaka (1614–15)
- Siege of Pskov (1615) – Ingrian War
- Siege of Gradisca (1616) – Uskok War
- Siege of Gradisca (1617) – Uskok War
- Siege of Chittagong (1617) – Mughal–Mrauk U Wars
- Siege of Pilsen (1618) – Thirty Years' War
- Siege of Moscow (1618) – Polish–Muscovite War (1605–1618)
- Siege of Budweis (1619) – Thirty Years' War
- Siege of Kassa (1619) – Thirty Years' War
- Siege of Vienna (1619) – Thirty Years' War
- Siege of Bad Kreuznach (1620) – Thirty Years' War
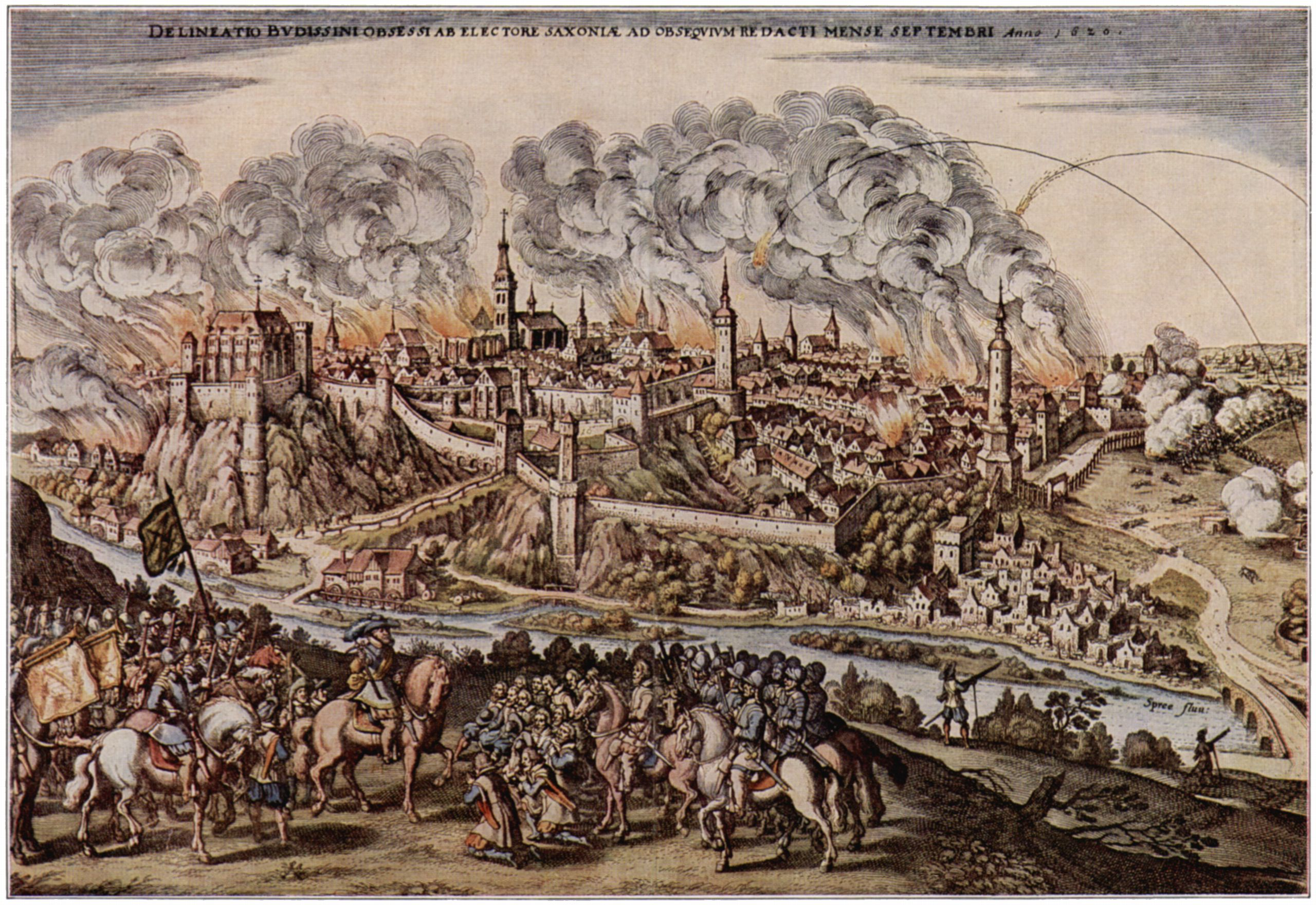
  The Siege of Bautzen by Saxon troops in 1620, an engraving by Matthäus Merian
- Siege of Bautzen (1620) – Thirty Years' War
- Siege of Neuhäusel (1621) – Thirty Years' War
- Siege of Chittagong (1621) – Mughal–Mrauk U Wars
- Siege of Saint-Jean-d'Angély (1621) – Huguenot rebellions
- Blockade of La Rochelle (1621–22) – Huguenot rebellions
- Siege of Montauban (1621) – Huguenot rebellions
- Siege of Pressburg (1621) – Thirty Years' War
- Siege of Riga (1621) – Polish–Swedish War (1621–25)
- Siege of Jülich (1621–22) – Eighty Years' War
- Siege of Frankenthal (1621–1623) – Thirty Years' War
- Siege of Ormuz (1622)
- Siege of Royan (1622) – Huguenot rebellions
- Siege of Nègrepelisse (1622) – Huguenot rebellions

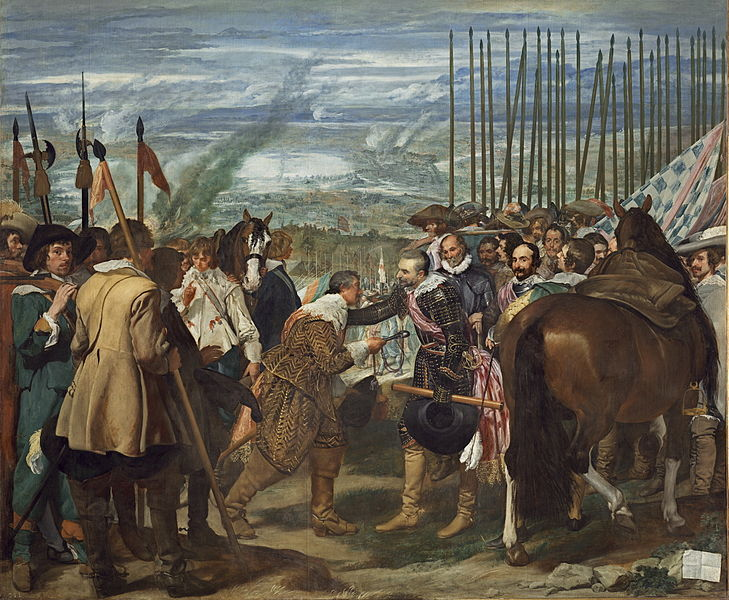
The Surrender of Breda (1625) by Diego Velázquez

- Siege of Montpellier (1622) – Huguenot rebellions
- Siege of Bergen-op-Zoom (1622) – Eighty Years' War
- Siege of Heidelberg (1622) – Thirty Years' War
- Capture of Mannheim (1622) – Thirty Years' War
- Siege of Araya Castle (1622–1623) – Eighty Years' War
- Siege of Breda (1624–1625) – Eighty Years' War
- Siege of Gavi (1625)
- Siege of Genoa (1625)
- Recapture of Bahia (1625) – Eighty Years' War
- Siege of Verrua (1625)
- Siege of Koknese (1625) – Polish–Swedish War (1621–25)
- Siege of Dorpat (1625) – Polish–Swedish War (1621–25)
- Siege of San Juan (1625) – Eighty Years' War
- Siege of Saint-Martin-de-Ré (1625)
- Siege of Oldenzaal (1626) – Eighty Years' War

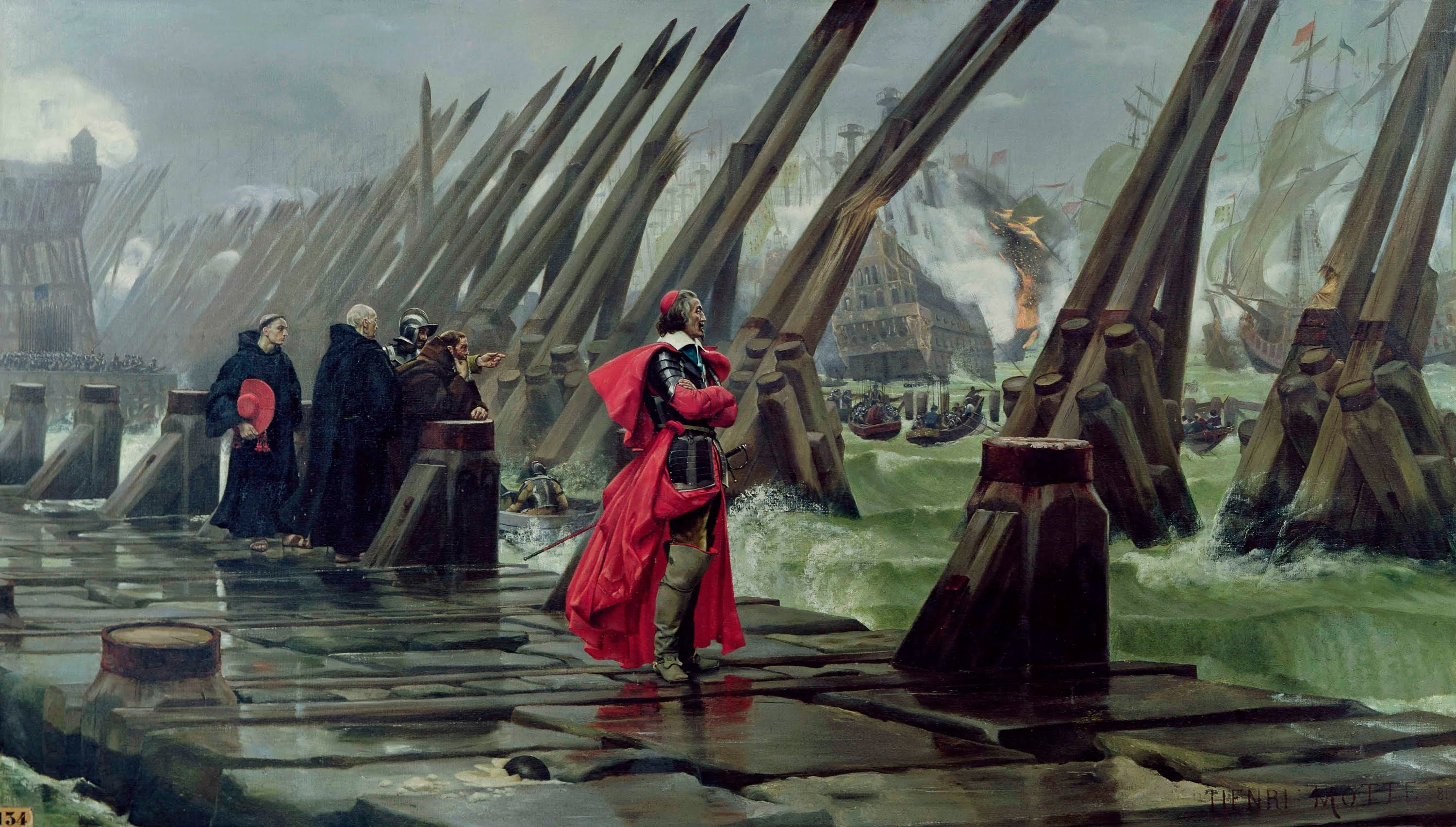
Cardinal Richelieu at the Siege of La Rochelle (1627–1628) by Henri-Paul Motte, 1881.

- Siege of Saint-Martin-de-Ré (1627) – Anglo-French War (1627–1629)
- Siege of Wolfenbüttel (1627) – Thirty Years' War
- Siege of Nienburg (1627) – Thirty Years' War
- Siege of Groenlo (1627) – Eighty Years' War
- Siege of La Rochelle (1627–1628) – Huguenot rebellions
- Siege of Stralsund (1628) – Thirty Years' War
- Siege of Glückstadt (1628) – Thirty Years' War
- Siege of Batavia (1628–29)
- Siege of Mantua (1629–30)
- Siege of Casale Monferrato (1629–31)
- Siege of 's-Hertogenbosch (1629) – Eighty Years' War
- Siege of Privas (1629) – Huguenot rebellions
- Siege of Alès (1629) – Huguenot rebellions
- Sack of Magdeburg (1631) – Thirty Years' War
- Siege of Kreuznach (1631) - Thirty Years' War
- Siege of Maastricht (1632) – Eighty Years' War
- Siege of Nuremberg (1632) – Thirty Years' War

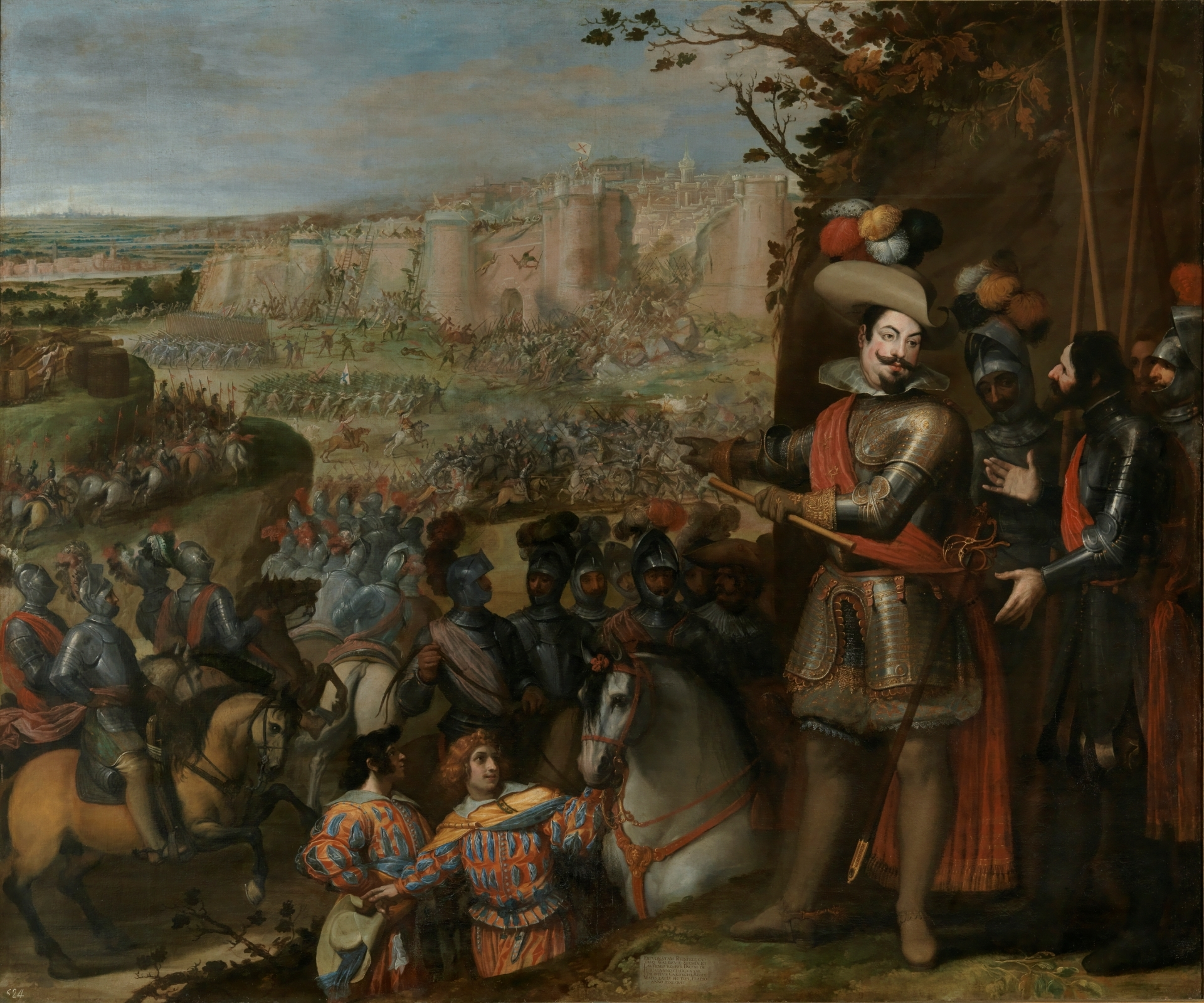
The Capture of Rheinfelden (1634) by Vincenzo Carducci.

- Siege of Dorogobuzh (1632) – Smolensk War
- Siege of Smolensk (1632–33) – Smolensk War
- Siege of Daulatabad (1633)
- Siege of Hameln (1633) – Thirty Years' War
- Siege of Hagenau (1633) – Thirty Years' War
- Relief of Konstanz (1633) – Thirty Years' War
- Siege of Rheinfelden (1633) – Thirty Years' War
- Siege of Regensburg (1633) – Thirty Years' War
- Siege of Belaya (1634)
- Siege of Überlingen (1634) – Thirty Years' War
- Siege of Regensburg (1634) – Thirty Years' War
- Siege of Lüshun (1634)
- Siege of Hildesheim (1634) – Thirty Years' War
- Siege of Nördlingen (1634) – Thirty Years' War
- Siege of Minden (1634) – Thirty Years' War
- Siege of Heidelberg (1634) – Thirty Years' War
- Siege of Leuven (1635) – Eighty Years' War
- Siege of Schenkenschans (1635–1636) – Eighty Years' War
- Siege of Mainz (1635) – Thirty Years' War
- Siege of Dôle (1636) – Franco-Spanish War (1635–59)
- Siege of La Capelle (1636) – Franco-Spanish War (1635–59)
- Siege of Le Câtelet (1636) – Franco-Spanish War (1635–59)
- Siege of Magdeburg (1636) – Thirty Years' War
- Siege of Corbie (1636) – Franco-Spanish War (1635–59)
- Siege of Leipzig (1637) – Thirty Years' War
- Siege of Breda (1637) – Eighty Years' War
- Siege of Landrecies (1637) – Franco-Spanish War (1635–59)
- Siege of Venlo (1637) – Eighty Years' War
- Siege of Leucate (1637) – Franco-Spanish War (1635–59)
- Siege of Hara Castle (1637–1638)
- Siege of Azov (1637–1642) – part of Russo-Turkish Wars
- Siege of Saint-Omer (1638) – Franco-Spanish War (1635–59)
- Siege of Fuenterrabía (1638) – Franco-Spanish War (1635–59)
- Battle of Breisach (1638) – Thirty Years' War
- Siege of Lemgo (1638) – Thirty Years' War
- Siege of Baghdad (1638) by Ottomans
- Siege of Hesdin (1639) – Franco-Spanish War (1635–59)
- Relief of Thionville (1639) – Franco-Spanish War (1635–59)
- Siege of Salses (1639–1640) – Franco-Spanish War (1635–59)
- Siege of Casale (1640) – Franco-Spanish War (1635–59)
- Siege of Galle (1640) – Dutch-Portuguese War
- Siege of Turin (1640) – Franco-Spanish War (1635–59)
- Siege of Arras (1640) – Franco-Spanish War (1635–59)
- Siege of Neunburg (1641) – Thirty Years' War
- Siege of Wolfenbüttel (1641) – Thirty Years' War
- Siege of São Filipe (1641–1642) – Portuguese Restoration War
- Siege of Dorsten (1641) – Thirty Years' War
- Siege of Göttingen (1641) – Thirty Years' War
- Siege of Perpignan (1641–1642) – Franco-Spanish War (1635–59)
- Siege of Glogau (1642) – Thirty Years' War
- Siege of Olmütz (1642) – Thirty Years' War
- Siege of Brieg (1642) – Thirty Years' War
- Siege of Leipzig (1642) – Thirty Years' War
- Siege of Hull (1642) – First English Civil War
- Siege of Portsmouth (1642) – first English Civil War
- Second siege of Glogau (1642) – Thirty Years' War
- Sieges of Bradford (1642–1643) – first English Civil War
- Siege of Reading (1642–1643) – first English Civil War
- Siege of Chichester (1642) – first English Civil War
- Siege of Rocroi (1643) – Franco-Spanish War (1635–59)
- Siege of Thionville (1643) – Franco-Spanish War (1635–59)
- Siege of Worcester (1643) – first English Civil War
- Siege of Lichfield (1643) – first English Civil War
- Siege of Gloucester (1643) – first English Civil War
- Siege of Sierck (1643) – Franco-Spanish War (1635–59)
- Siege of Hull (1643) – first English Civil War
- Siege of Newcastle (1644) – first English Civil War
- Siege of Lathom House (1644) – first English Civil War
- Siege of Überlingen (1644) – Thirty Years' War
- Siege of Lyme Regis (1644) – first English Civil War
- Siege of York (1644) – first English Civil War
- Siege of Lincoln (1644) – first English Civil War
- Siege of Lleida (1644) – Franco-Spanish War (1635–59)
- Siege of Gravelines (1644) – Franco-Spanish War (1635–59)
- Siege of Oxford (1644–1646) – first English Civil War
- Siege of Sas van Gent (1644) – Eighty Years' War
- Siege of Philippsburg (1644) – Thirty Years' War
- Siege of Kassa (1644) – Thirty Years' War, Transylvanian intervention
- Siege of Montgomery Castle (1644) – first English Civil War
- Sieges of Taunton (1644–1645) – first English Civil War
- Siege of Duncannon (1645) – Irish Confederate Wars
- Siege of Chester (1645) – first English Civil War
- Great Siege of Scarborough Castle (1645) – first English Civil War
- Siege of Carlisle (1644) – first English Civil War
- Siege of Brünn (1645) – Thirty Years' War
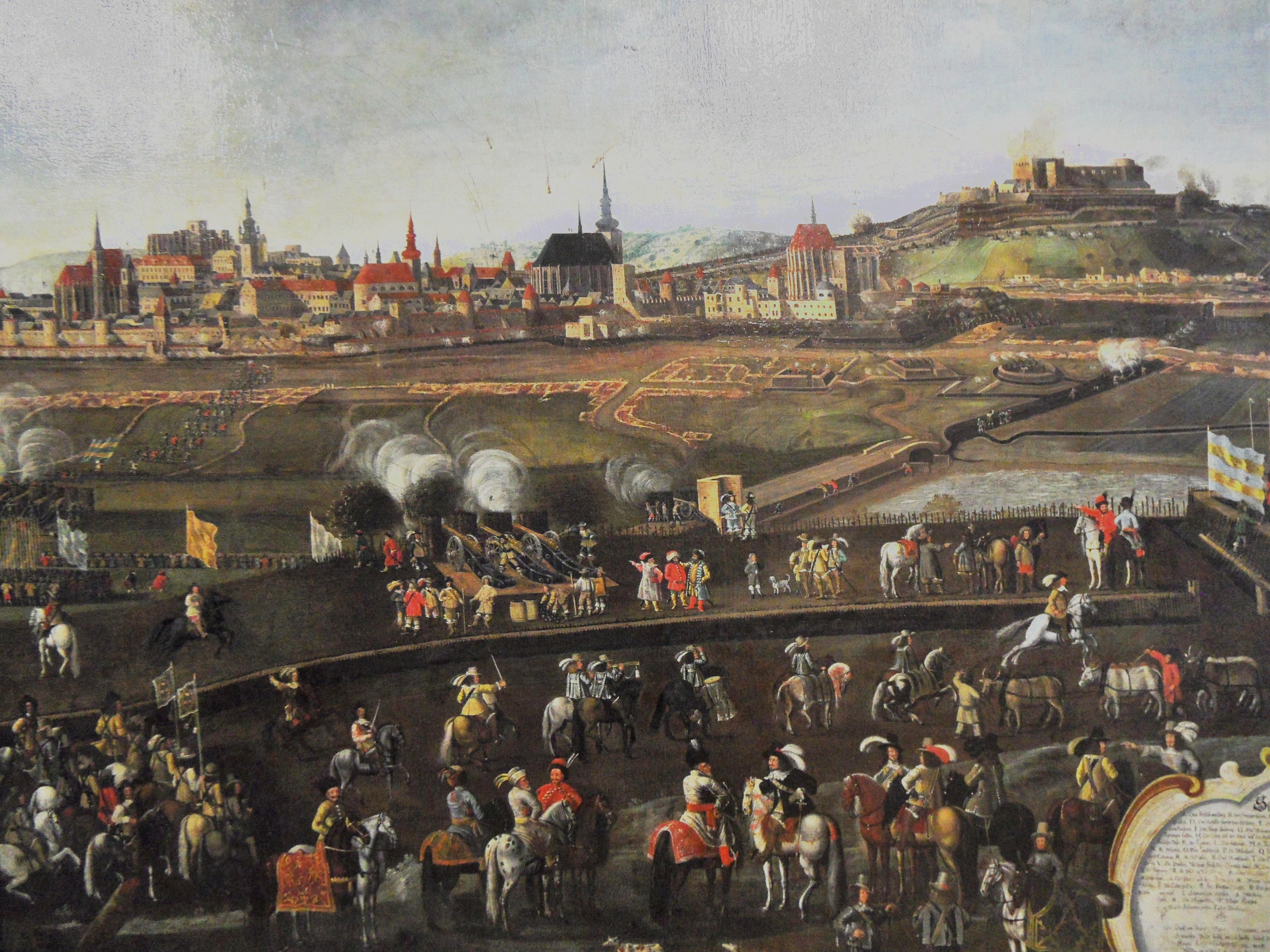
  The 1645 siege of Brno by Swedish and Transylvanian forces
- Siege of Mardyck (1645) – Franco-Spanish War (1635–59)
- Siege of Bristol (1645) – first English Civil War
- Siege of Béthune (1645) – Franco-Spanish War (1635–59)
- Siege of Lillers (1645) – Franco-Spanish War (1635–59)
- Siege of Saint-Venant (1645) – Franco-Spanish War (1635–59)
- Siege of Hulst (1645) – Eighty Years' War
- Siege of Worcester (1646) – first English Civil War
- Siege of Mardyck (1646) – Thirty Years' War
- Siege of Dunkirk (1646) – Franco-Spanish War (1635–59)
- Siege of Augsburg (1646) – Thirty Years' War
- Siege of Lindau (1647) – Thirty Years' War
- Siege of Armentières (1647) – Franco-Spanish War (1635–59)
- Siege of Landrecies (1647) – Franco-Spanish War (1635–59)
- Siege of Ypres (1647) – Franco-Spanish War (1635–59)
- Siege of Memmingen (1647) – Thirty Years' War
- Siege of Bar (1648) – Khmelnytsky Uprising, Polish–Lithuanian Commonwealth
- Siege of Candia (Crete) (1648–69)
- Siege of Pembroke (1648) – Second English Civil War
- Siege of Colchester (1648) – second English Civil War
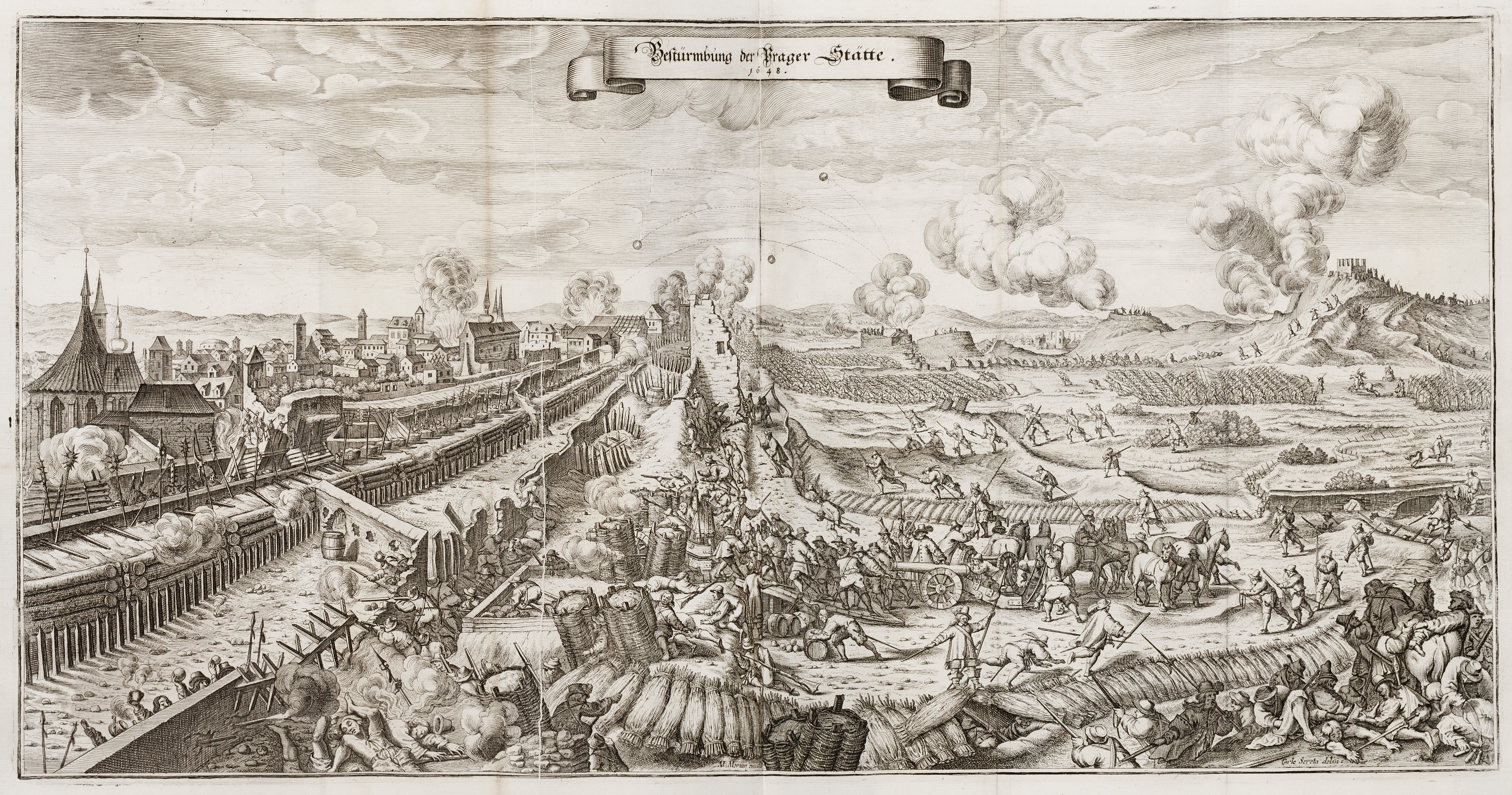
  The final battle of the Thirty Years' War; Swedish siege of Prague (1648)
- Siege of Prague (1648) – Thirty Years' War
- Siege of Inverness (1649)
- Siege of Zbarazh (1649) – Khmelnytsky uprising, Polish–Lithuanian Commonwealth
- Siege of Dublin (1649)
- Siege of Drogheda (1649) – Cromwellian conquest of Ireland
- Siege of Wexford (1649) – Cromwellian conquest of Ireland
- Siege of Waterford (1649–1650) – Cromwellian conquest of Ireland
- Siege of Inverness (1650)
- Siege of Kilkenny (1650) – Cromwellian conquest of Ireland
- Siege of Clonmel (1650) – Irish Confederate Wars
- Siege of Charlemont (1650) – Irish Confederate Wars
- Cromwell's Siege of Limerick City, Ireland (1651) – Irish Confederate Wars
- Siege of Barcelona (1651–1652), during the Catalan Revolt
- Siege of Galway (1651–1652) – Irish Confederate Wars

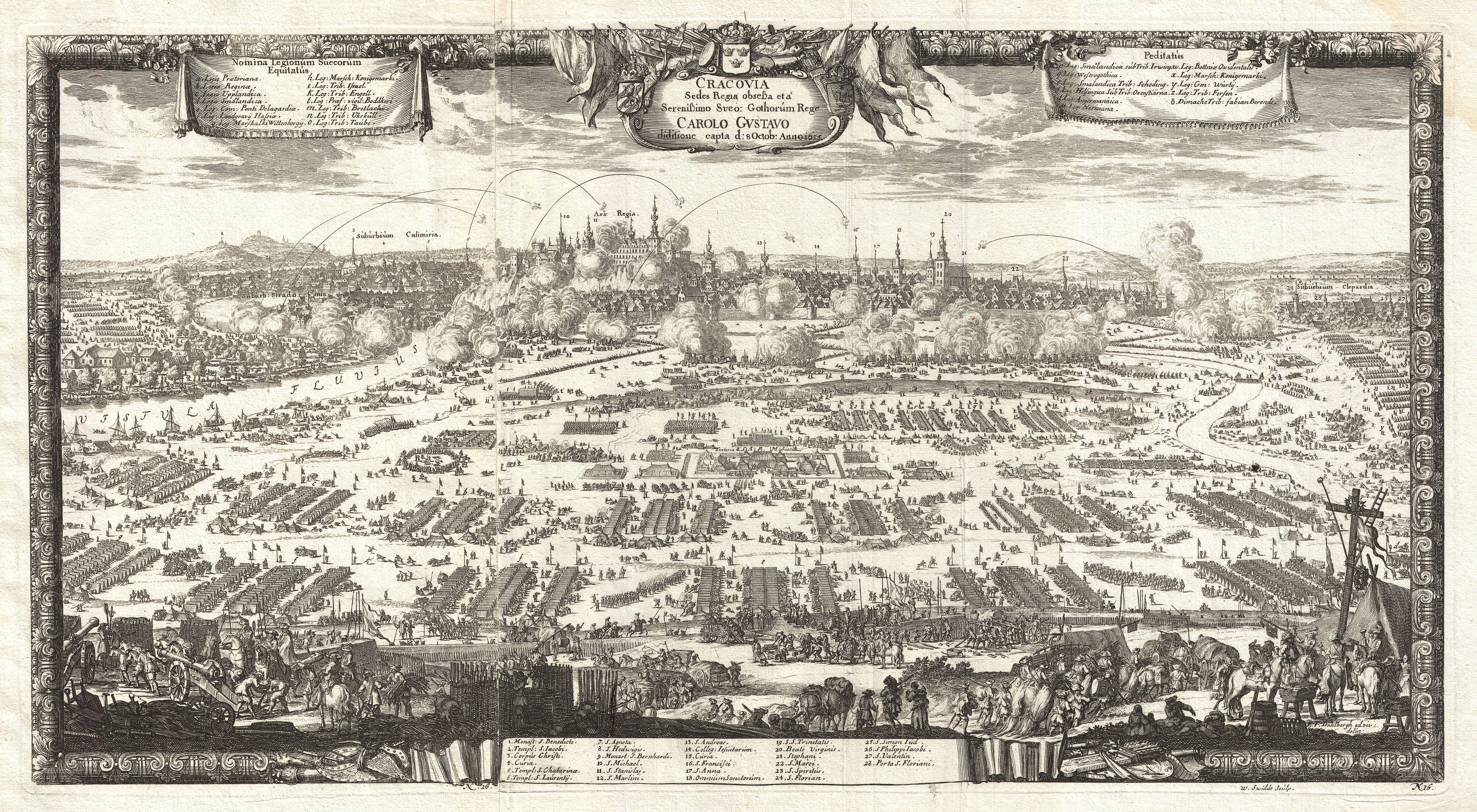
Siege of Kraków, 8 October 1655 – view from 1697 by the German historian Samuel Pufendorf

- Siege of Arras (1654) – Franco-Spanish War (1635–59)
- Siege of Smolensk (1654) – Russo-Polish War (1654–67)
- Siege of Landrecies (1655) – Franco-Spanish War (1635–59)
- Siege of Santo Domingo (1655) – Anglo-Spanish War (1654–60)
- Siege of Kraków (1655) – Second Northern War
- Siege of Danzig (1655–60) – second Northern War
- Siege of Jasna Góra (1655) – during The Deluge
- Siege of Valenciennes (1656) – Franco-Spanish War (1635–59)
- Siege of Zamość (1656) – second Northern War
- Siege of Warsaw (1656) – second Northern War
- Siege of Nöteborg (1656) – Russo-Swedish War (1656–58)
- Siege of Nyenschantz (1656) – Russo-Swedish War (1656–58)
- Siege of Dyneburg (1656) – Russo-Swedish War (1656–58)
- Siege of Riga (1656) – Russo-Swedish War (1656–58)
- Siege of Dorpat (1656) – Russo-Swedish War (1656–58)

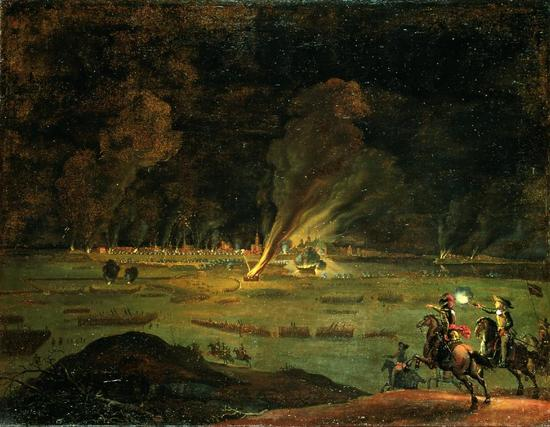
The assault of Copenhagen on the night between 10 and 11 February 1659 by Daniel Vertangen, 1659.

- Siege of Bidar (1657)
- Siege of Kraków (1657) – second Northern War
- Siege of Dorpat (1657) – Russo-Swedish War (1656–58)
- Siege of Dunkirk (1658) – Franco-Spanish War (1635–59)
- Siege of Toruń (1658) – second Northern War
- Siege of Badajoz (1658) – Portuguese Restoration War
- Siege of Copenhagen (1658–1659) Second Northern War, Swedes defeated by Danish and Dutch defenders
- Siege of Kolding (1658) – second Northern War
- Siege of Lyakhavichy (1660) – Russo-Polish War (1654–67)
- Siege of Fort Zeelandia (1661–1662) – Sino-Dutch conflicts
- Siege of Érsekújvár (1663) – Austro-Turkish War (1663–1664)
- Siege of Hlukhiv (1664) – Russo-Polish War (1654–67)
- Siege of Valência de Alcântara (1664)
- Siege of Novi Zrin Castle (1664) in northern Croatia – Austro-Turkish War (1663–64)
- Siege of Léva (1664) – Austro-Turkish War (1663–1664)
- Siege of Purandhar (1665)
- Siege of Ponda (1666)
- Siege of Charleroi (1667) – War of Devolution
- Siege of Tournai (1667) – War of Devolution
- Siege of Douai (1667) – War of Devolution
- Siege of Lille (1667) – War of Devolution
- Siege of Dole (1668) – War of Devolution
- Siege of Solovetsky Monastery (1668–76) – eight years
- Siege of Groenlo (1672) – Franco-Dutch War
- Siege of Groningen (1672) – Franco-Dutch War
- Siege of Kamenets (1672) – Polish–Ottoman War (1672–76)

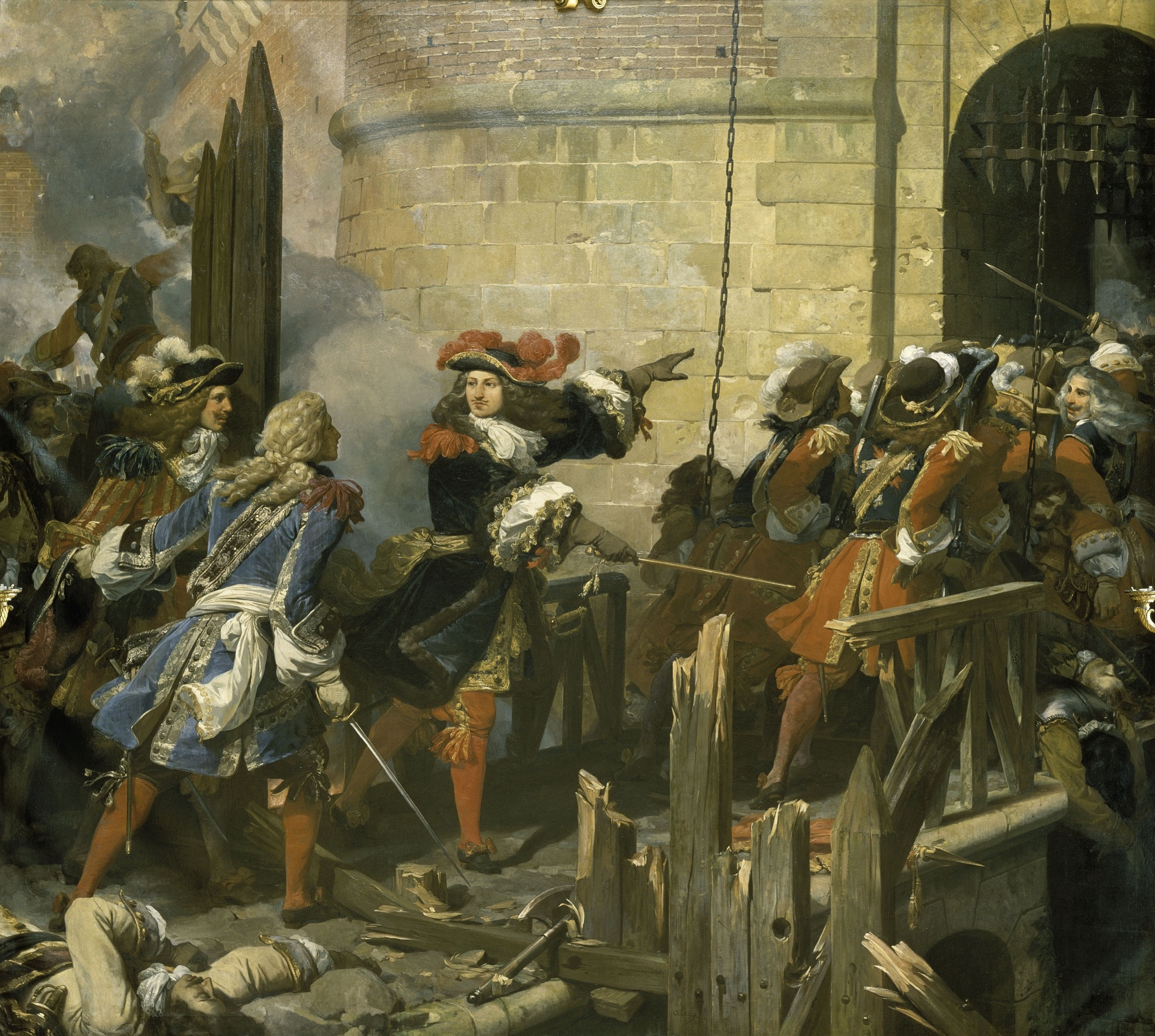
Musketeers of the Guard entering the citadel of Valenciennes (1676-77).

- Siege of Maastricht (1673) – Franco-Dutch War
- Siege of Bonn (1673) – Franco-Dutch War
- Siege of Besançon (1674) – Franco-Dutch War
- Siege of Trembowla (1675) – Polish–Ottoman War (1672–76)
- Siege of Ponda (1675)
- Siege of Maastricht (1676) – Franco-Dutch War
- Siege of Philippsburg (1676) – Franco-Dutch War
- Siege of Valenciennes (1676–77) – Franco-Dutch War
- Siege of Freiburg (1677) – Franco-Dutch War
- Siege of Cambrai (1677) – Franco-Dutch War
- Siege of Malmö (1677) – Scanian War
- Siege of Ghent (1678) – Franco-Dutch War
- Siege of Ypres (1678) – Franco-Dutch War
- Siege of Puigcerdà (1678) – Franco-Dutch War
- Siege of Stralsund (1678) – Scanian War
- Siege of Vienna (1683) – siege of Vienna during the Great Turkish War
- Siege of Luxembourg (1684) – War of the Reunions
- Siege of Genoa (1684) – War of the Reunions
- Siege of Buda (1684), Austrian army tried to take Buda from Ottoman Turkey
- Siege of Santa Maura (1684) – Morean War
- Siege of Sinj (1684) – Morean War
- Siege of Sinj (1685) – Morean War
- Siege of Bijapur (1685–86)
- Siege of Cojor (1685) – Morean War

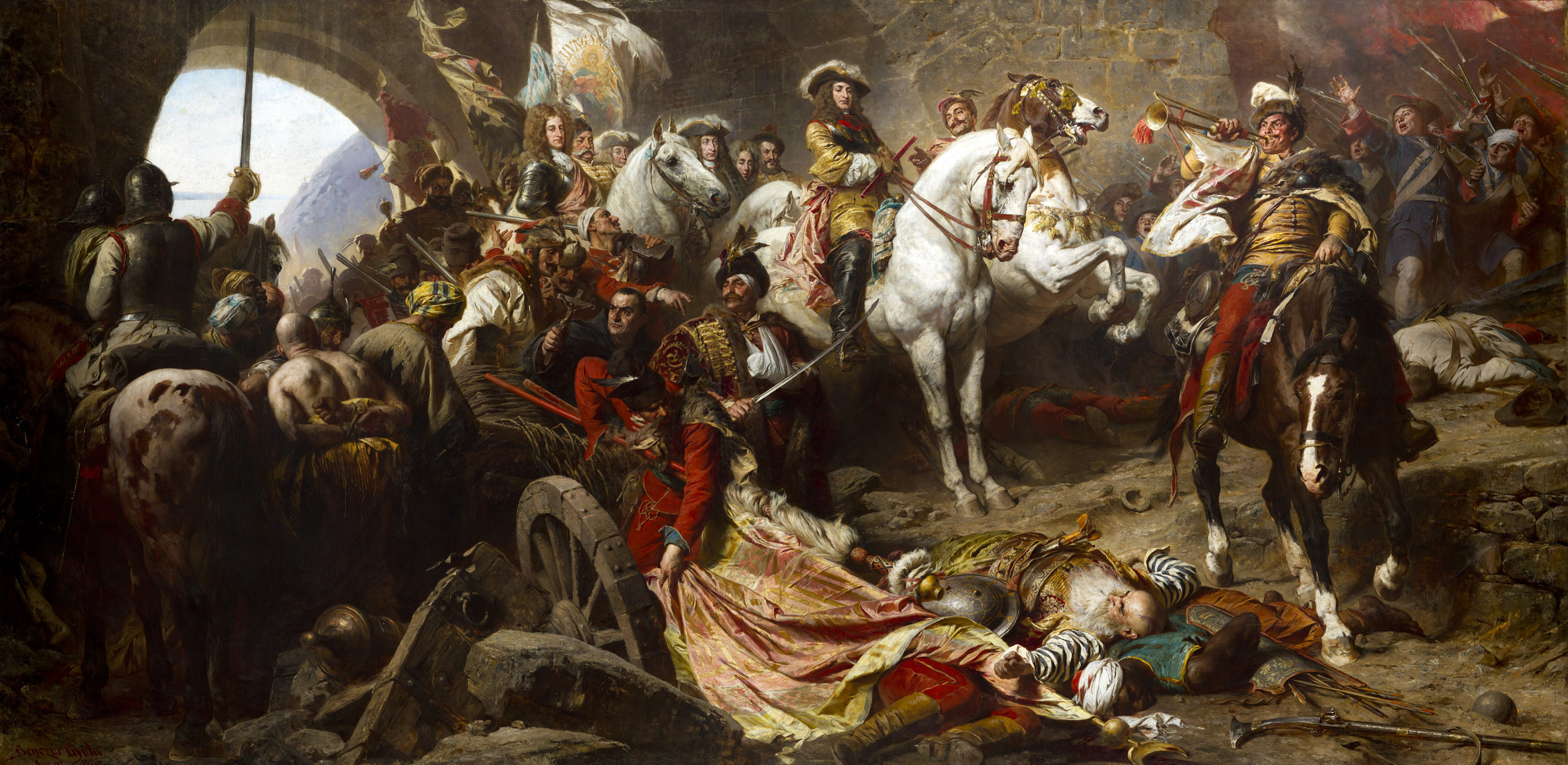
Reoccupation of Buda Castle in 1686. Gyula Benczúr (1896), oil on canvas

- Siege of Érsekújvár (1685) – Great Turkish War
- Siege of Kelefa (1686) – Morean War
- Siege of Navarino (1686) – Morean War
- Siege of Buda (1686) – Great Turkish War
- Siege of Modon (1686) – Morean War
- Siege of Nauplia (1686) – Morean War
- Siege of Pécs (1686) – Great Turkish War
- Siege of Golconda (1687)
- Siege of Castelnuovo (1687) – Morean War

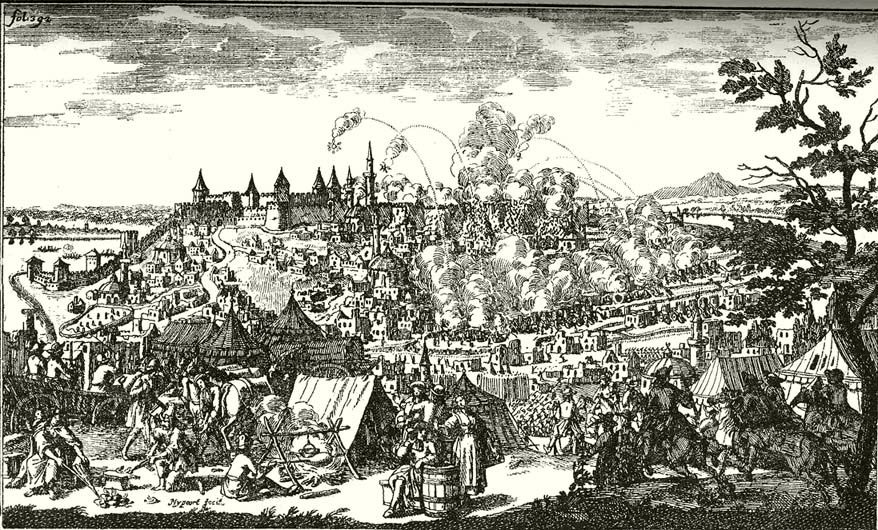
Siege of Belgrade, 1688 by Adlerschwung

- Siege of Monemvasia (1687–1690) – Morean War
- Siege of the Acropolis (1687) – Morean War
- Siege of Bangkok (1688) – Siamese revolution of 1688
- Siege of Negroponte (1688) – Great Turkish War
- Siege of Belgrade (1688) – Great Turkish War
- Siege of Knin (1688) – Morean War
- Siege of Philippsburg (1688) – Nine Years' War
- Siege of Mannheim (1688) – Nine Years' War
- Siege of Frankenthal (1688) – Nine Years' War
- Siege of Derry (1689) – Williamite War in Ireland
- Siege of Kaiserswerth (1689) – Nine Years' War
- Siege of Mainz (1689) – Nine Years' War
- Siege of Larache (1689)
- Siege of Pemaquid (1689) – Nine Years' War
- Siege of Carrickfergus (1689) – Williamite War in Ireland
- Siege of Bonn (1689) – Nine Years' War
- Siege of Gingee (1689–1698)
- First siege of Athlone (1690), Williamite War in Ireland
- Siege of Kanina (1690) – Morean War
- Siege of Niš (1690) – Great Turkish War

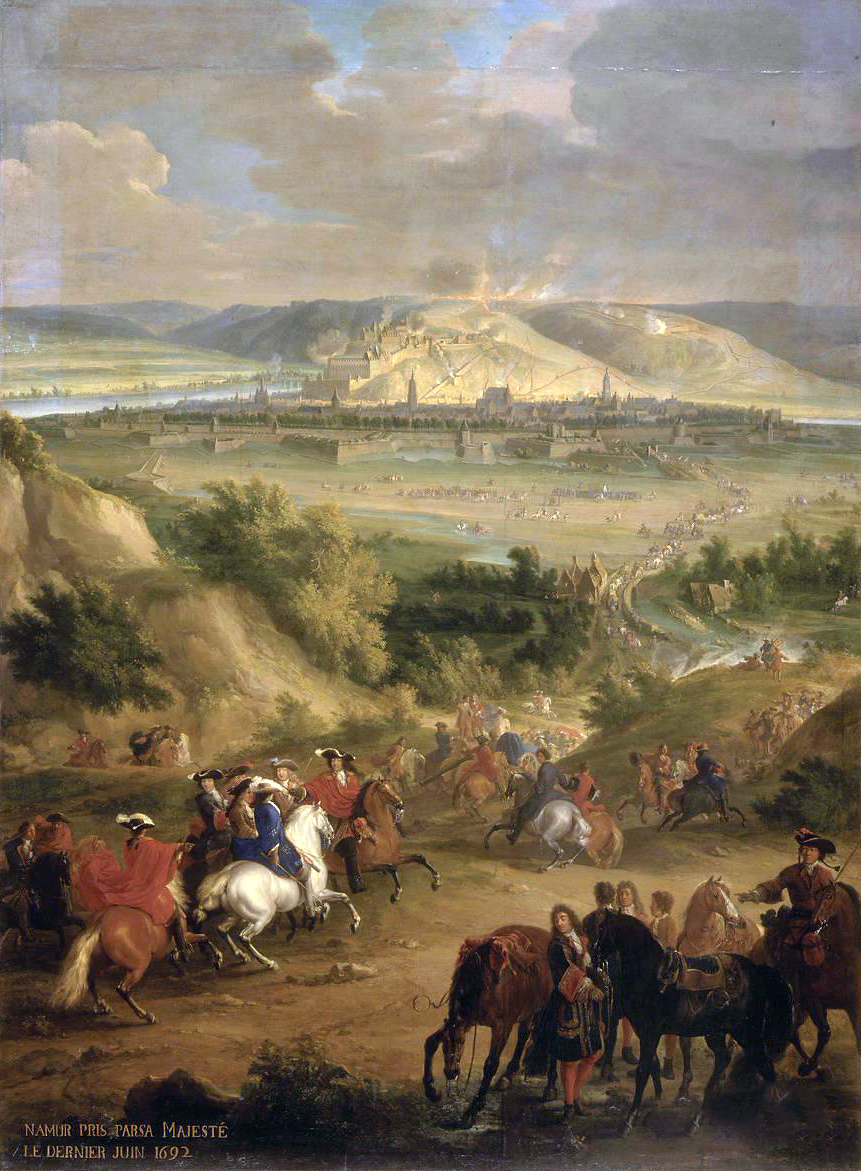
Siege of Namur 1692, by Jean-Baptiste Martin, 1693.

- Siege of Cork (1690) – Williamite War in Ireland
- Siege of Belgrade (1690) – Great Turkish War
- Siege of Québec City (1690) – first siege of Québec City
- Siege of Jinji (1690–1698)
- Siege of Limerick (1691), Williamite War in Ireland
- Second siege of Athlone (1691), Williamite War in Ireland
- Siege of Mons (1691) – Nine Years' War
- Siege of Cuneo (1691) – Nine Years' War
- Siege of Candia (1692) – Morean War
- Siege of Namur (1692) – Nine Years' War
- Siege of Embrun (1692) – Nine Years' War
- Siege of Ebernburg (1692) – Nine Years' War
- Siege of Belgrade (1693) – Great Turkish War
- Siege of Huy (1693) – Nine Years' War
- Siege of Charleroi (1693) – Nine Years' War
- Siege of Pinerolo (1693) – Nine Years' War
- Siege of Chios (1694) – Morean War
- Siege of Palamos (1694) – Nine Years' War
- Siege of Gerona (1694) – Nine Years' War
- Siege of Huy (1694) – Nine Years' War

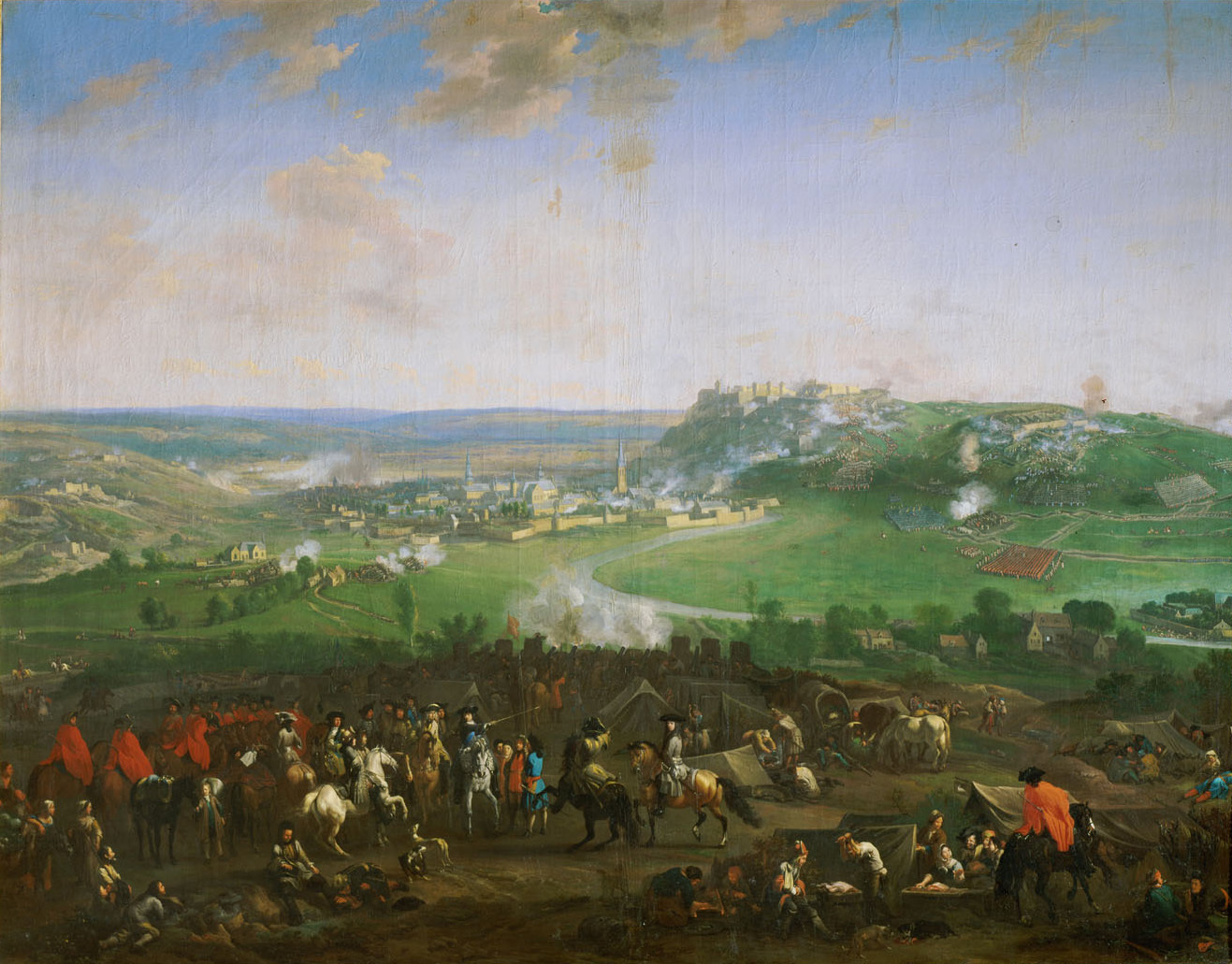
Siege of Namur (1695) by Jan van Huchtenburg.

- Siege of Ceuta (1694–1727)
- Siege of Casale (1695) – Nine Years' War
- Siege of Namur (1695) – Nine Years' War
- Capitulation of Diksmuide (1695) – Nine Years' War
- Siege of Mombasa (1696–1698) – Omani–Portuguese conflicts
- Siege of Pemaquid (1696) – Nine Years' War
- Siege of Fort Nashwaak (1696) – Nine Years' War
- Siege of Ath (1697) – Nine Years' War
- Siege of Barcelona (1697) – Nine Years' War
- Siege of Ebernburg (1697) – Nine Years' War
- Siege of Cartagena de Indias (1697)
- Siege of Riga (1700) – Great Northern War
- Siege of Tönning (1700) – Great Northern War
- Siege of Riga (1700) – Great Northern War
- Siege of Narva (1700) – Great Northern War

=== 18th century ===
- Siege of Kaiserswerth (1702) – War of the Spanish Succession

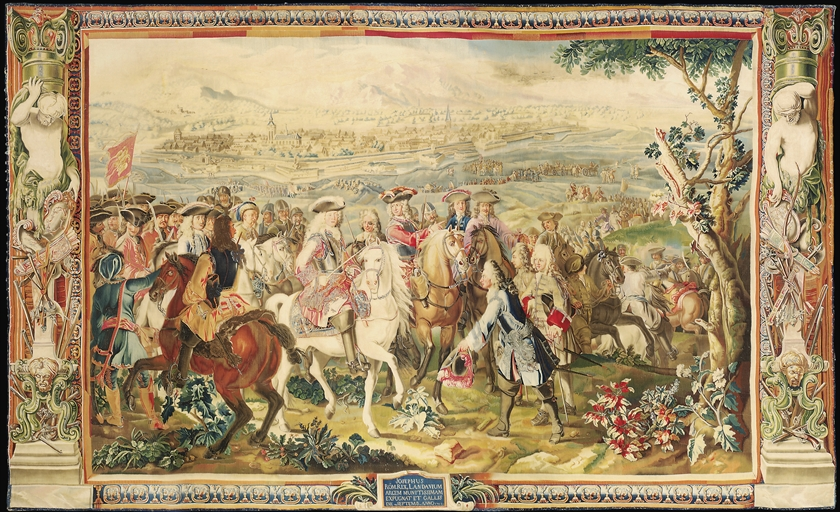
Tapestry depicting the 1702 victory of Archduke Joseph of Austria at Landau, woven for Leopold, Duke of Lorraine, between 1710 and 1718.

- Siege of Saint Donas (1702) – War of the Spanish Succession
- Siege of Castiglione (1702) – War of the Spanish Succession
- Siege of Landau (1702) – War of the Spanish Succession
- Siege of Borgoforte (1702) – War of the Spanish Succession
- Siege of Guastalla (1702) – War of the Spanish Succession
- Siege of Venlo (1702) – War of the Spanish Succession
- Siege of Stevensweert (1702) – War of the Spanish Succession
- Siege of Roermond (1702) – War of the Spanish Succession
- Siege of Nöteborg (1702) – Great Northern War
- Siege of Liége (1702) – War of the Spanish Succession
- Siege of Rheinberg (1702) – War of the Spanish Succession
- Siege of Hulst (1702) – War of the Spanish Succession
- Siege of Trarbach (1702) – War of the Spanish Succession
- Siege of St. Augustine (1702) – War of the Spanish Succession
- Siege of Andernach (1702) – War of the Spanish Succession
- Siege of Governolo (1702) – War of the Spanish Succession

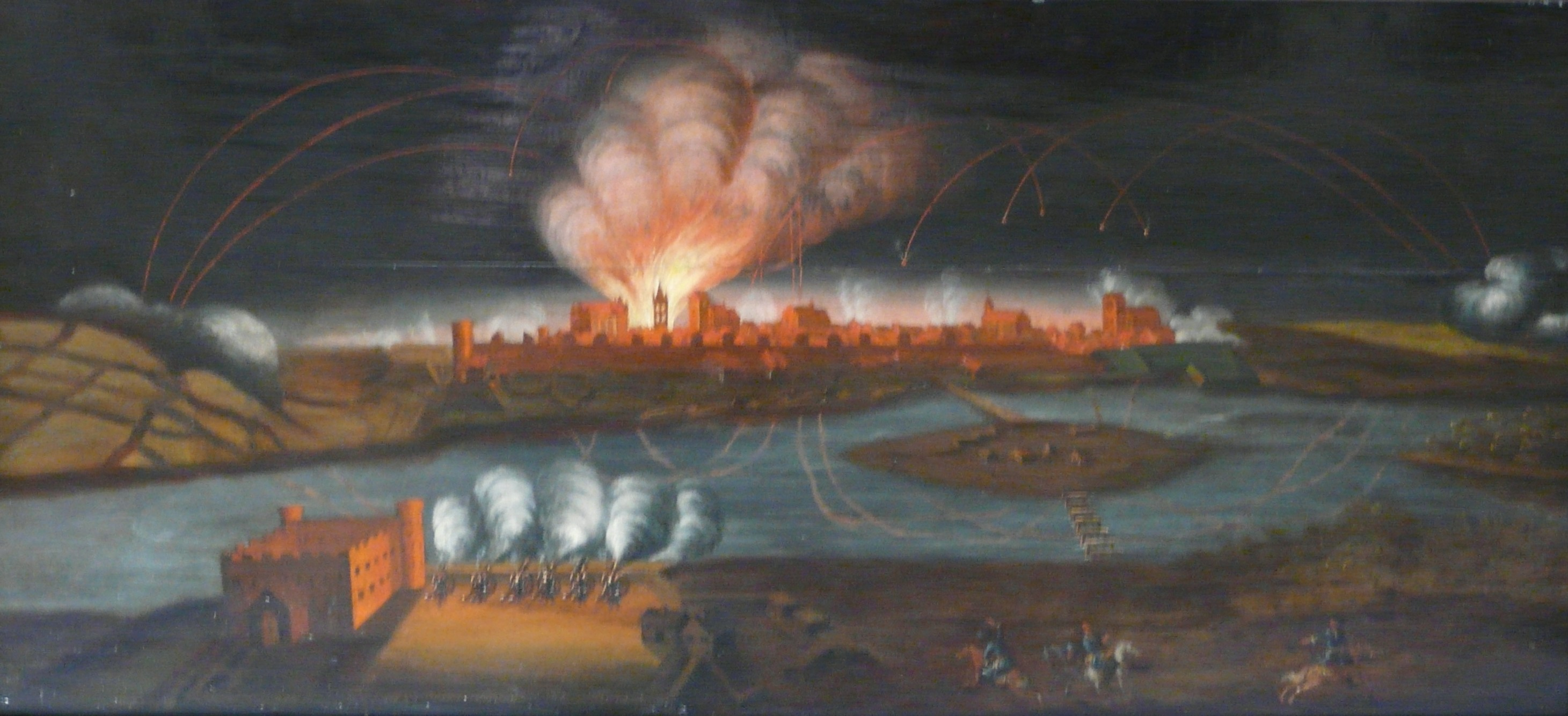
Siege of Toruń in 1703

- Siege of Neubourg (1703) – War of the Spanish Succession
- Siege of Kehl (1703) – War of the Spanish Succession
- Siege of Bonn (1703) – War of the Spanish Succession
- Siege of Thorn (1703) – Great Northern War
- Siege of Nago (1703) – War of the Spanish Succession
- Siege of Arco (1703) – War of the Spanish Succession
- Siege of Breisach (1703) – War of the Spanish Succession
- Siege of Huy (1703) – War of the Spanish Succession
- Siege of Limburg (1703) – War of the Spanish Succession
- Siege of Landau (1703) – War of the Spanish Succession
- Siege of Augsburg (1703) – War of the Spanish Succession
- Siege of Guadeloupe (1703) – War of the Spanish Succession
- Siege of Castello de Vide (1704) – War of the Spanish Succession
- Siege of Wagingera (1704)
- Siege of Barcelona (1704) – War of the Spanish Succession
- Siege of Susa (1704) – War of the Spanish Succession
- Siege of Portalegre (1704) – War of the Spanish Succession
- Siege of Vercelli (1704) – War of the Spanish Succession

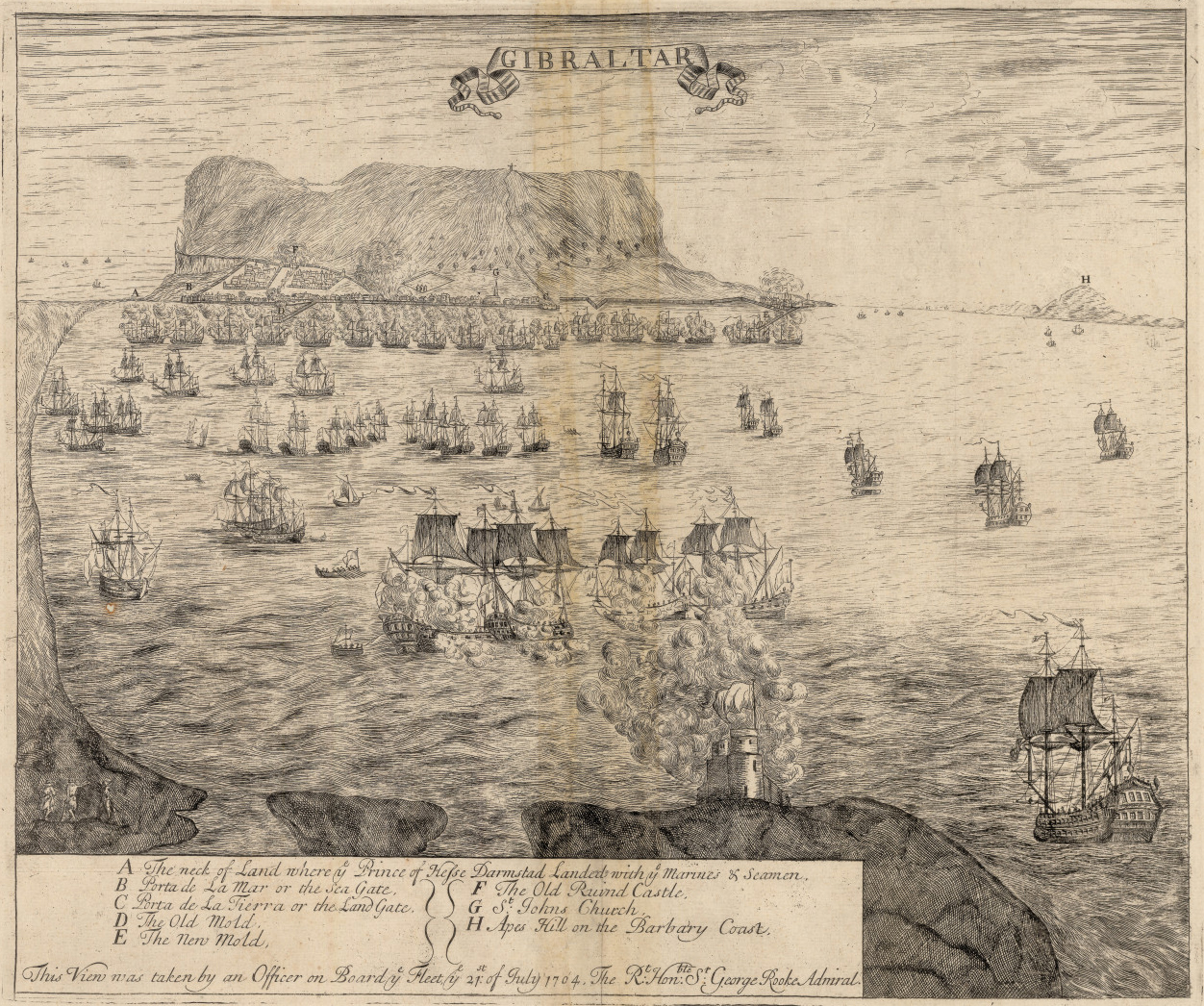
View of Gibraltar in 1704

- Siege of Rain (1704) – War of the Spanish Succession
- Siege of Narva (1704) – Great Northern War
- Siege of Dorpat (1704) – Great Northern War
- Siege of Villingen (1704) – War of the Spanish Succession
- Siege of Susa (1704) – War of the Spanish Succession
- Siege of Fort Isabella (1704) – War of the Spanish Succession
- Siege of Gibraltar (1704) – eleventh siege of Gibraltar, by Sir George Rooke's Anglo-Dutch fleet
- Siege of Ulm (1704) – War of the Spanish Succession
- Twelfth Siege of Gibraltar (1704–05) – War of the Spanish Succession
- Siege of Ivree (1704) – War of the Spanish Succession
- Siege of Landau (1704) – War of the Spanish Succession
- Siege of Verrua (1704) – War of the Spanish Succession
- Siege of Trarbach (1704) – War of the Spanish Succession
- Siege of Colonia del Sacramento (1704–1705) – War of the Spanish Succession
- Siege of St. John's (1705) – War of the Spanish Succession
- Siege of Valencia de Alcantara (1705) – War of the Spanish Succession
- Siege of Albuquerque (1705) – War of the Spanish Succession
- Siege of Huy (1705) – War of the Spanish Succession
- Siege of Liège (1705) – War of the Spanish Succession
- Second siege of Huy (1705) – War of the Spanish Succession
- Siege of Chivasso (1705) – War of the Spanish Succession
- Siege of Mirandola (1705) – War of the Spanish Succession
- Siege of Nice (1705–06) – War of the Spanish Succession
- Siege of Zoutleeuw (1705) – War of the Spanish Succession
- Siege of Barcelona (1705) – War of the Spanish Succession
- Siege of Hagenau (1705) – War of the Spanish Succession
- Siege of Badajoz (1705) – War of the Spanish Succession
- Siege of Zandvliet (1705) – War of the Spanish Succession
- Siege of Diest (1705) – War of the Spanish Succession

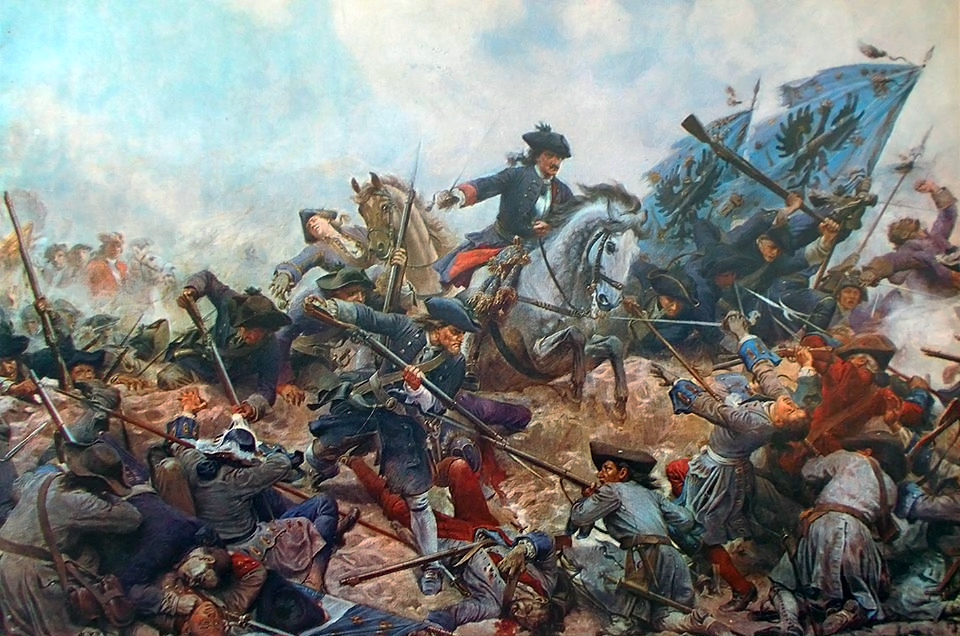
Prussian infantry breaks the French lines during the relief of Turin in 1706

- Siege of San Mateo (1705) – War of the Spanish Succession
- Siege of Tripoli (1705) – Tripolitanian-Tunisian War (1704–1709)
- Siege of Alcantara (1706) – War of the Spanish Succession
- Siege of Barcelona (1706) – War of the Spanish Succession
- Siege of Hagenau (1706) – War of the Spanish Succession
- Siege of Ciudad Rodrigo (1706) – War of the Spanish Succession
- Siege of Turin (1706) – War of the Spanish Succession
- Siege of Oostende (1706) – War of the Spanish Succession
- Siege of Menin (1706) – War of the Spanish Succession
- Siege of Alicante (1706) – War of the Spanish Succession
- Siege of Dendermonde (1706) – War of the Spanish Succession
- Siege of Ath (1706) – War of the Spanish Succession
- Siege of Pavia (1706) – War of the Spanish Succession
- Siege of Cuenca (1706) – War of the Spanish Succession
- Siege of Pizzigetone (1706) – War of the Spanish Succession
- Siege of Elche (1706) – War of the Spanish Succession
- Siege of Cartagena (1706) – War of the Spanish Succession
- Siege of Casale (1706) – War of the Spanish Succession
- Siege of Milan (1707) – War of the Spanish Succession
- Siege of Villena (1707) – War of the Spanish Succession
- Siege of Xàtiva (1707) – War of the Spanish Succession
- Siege of Port Royal (1707) – War of the Spanish Succession
- Siege of Toulon (1707) – War of the Spanish Succession
- Siege of Gaeta (1707) – War of the Spanish Succession
- Siege of Pensacola (1707) – War of the Spanish Succession
- Siege of Ciudad Rodrigo (1707) – War of the Spanish Succession

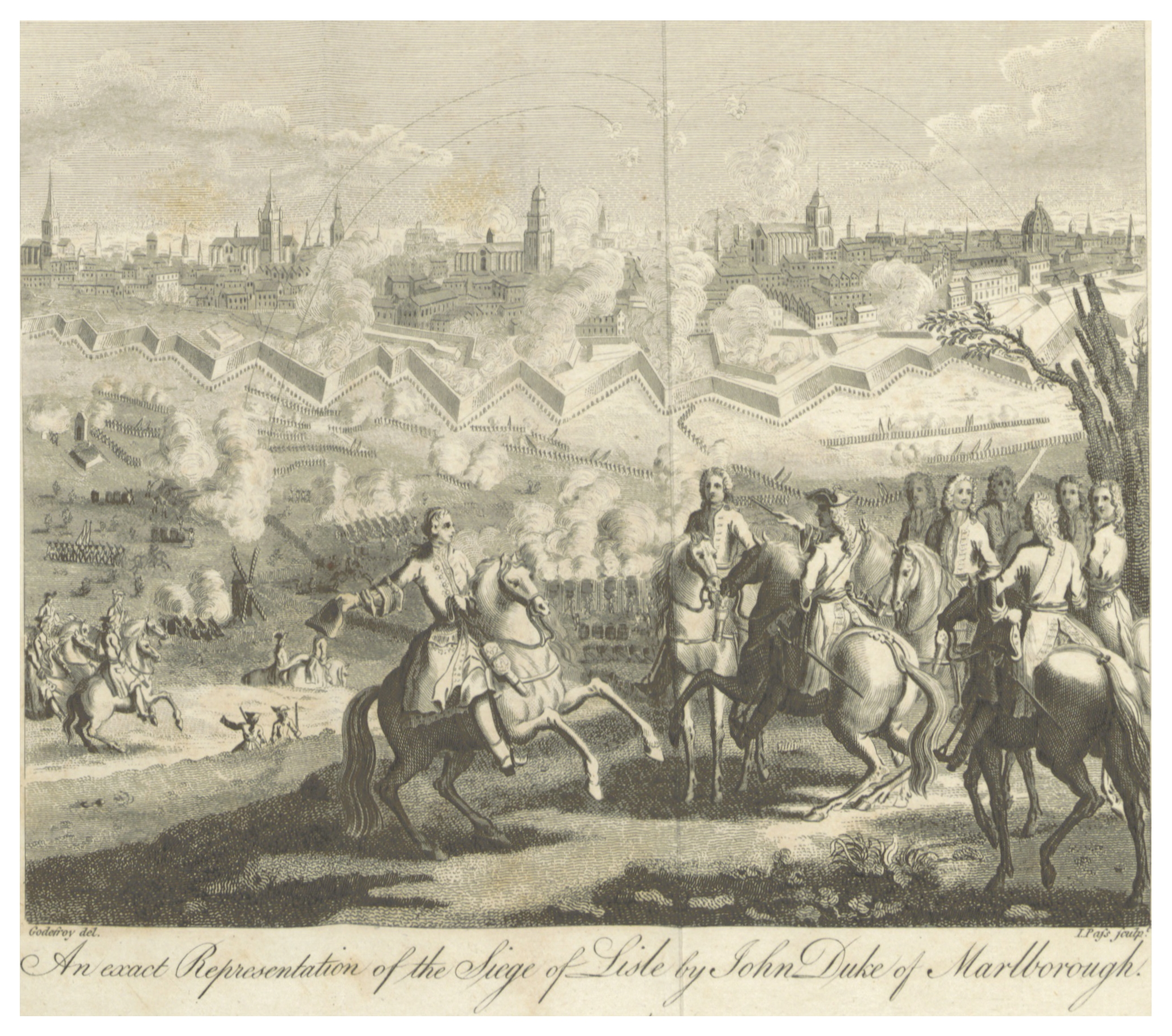
Siege of Lille in 1708

- Siege of Susa (1707) – War of the Spanish Succession
- Siege of Lérida (1707) – War of the Spanish Succession
- Siege of Morella (1707) – War of the Spanish Succession
- Siege of Oran (1707–1708) – Conflicts between Spain and Algiers
- Siege of Terki (1708) – Murat Kuchukov Movement
- Siege of Tortosa (1708) – War of the Spanish Succession
- Siege of Exilles (1708) – War of the Spanish Succession
- Siege of Lille (1708) – War of the Spanish Succession
- Siege of Fenestrelles (1708) – War of the Spanish Succession
- Siege of San Felipe (1708) – War of the Spanish Succession
- Siege of Leffinghe (1708) – War of the Spanish Succession
- Siege of Denia (1708) – War of the Spanish Succession
- Siege of Saint Ghislain (1708) – War of the Spanish Succession
- Siege of Brussels (1708) – War of the Spanish Succession
- Siege of Alicante (1708–09) – War of the Spanish Succession
- Siege of Ghent (1708) – War of the Spanish Succession
- Siege of Veprik (1709) – Great Northern War
- Siege of Tournai (1709) – War of the Spanish Succession
- Siege of Mons (1709) – War of the Spanish Succession
- Siege of Viborg (1710) – Great Northern War
- Siege of Reval (1710) – Great Northern War
- Siege of Douai (1710) – War of the Spanish Succession
- Siege of Béthune (1710) – War of the Spanish Succession
- Siege of Aire (1710) – War of the Spanish Succession
- Siege of Saint Venant (1710) – War of the Spanish Succession
- Siege of Port Royal (1710) – War of the Spanish Succession
- Siege of Gerona (1710–1711) – War of the Spanish Succession
- Siege of Kassa (1711) – Rákóczi's War of Independence
- Siege of Aren fort (1711) – War of the Spanish Succession
- Siege of Bouchain (1711) – War of the Spanish Succession
- Siege of Venasque (1711) – War of the Spanish Succession
- Siege of Stralsund (1711–15) – Great Northern War
- Siege of Castel-Leon (1711) – War of the Spanish Succession
- Siege of Cardona (1711) – War of the Spanish Succession
- Siege of Le Quesnoy (1712) – War of the Spanish Succession
- Siege of Landrecies (1712) – War of the Spanish Succession
- Siege of Marchiennes (1712) – War of the Spanish Succession
- Siege of Douai (1712) – War of the Spanish Succession

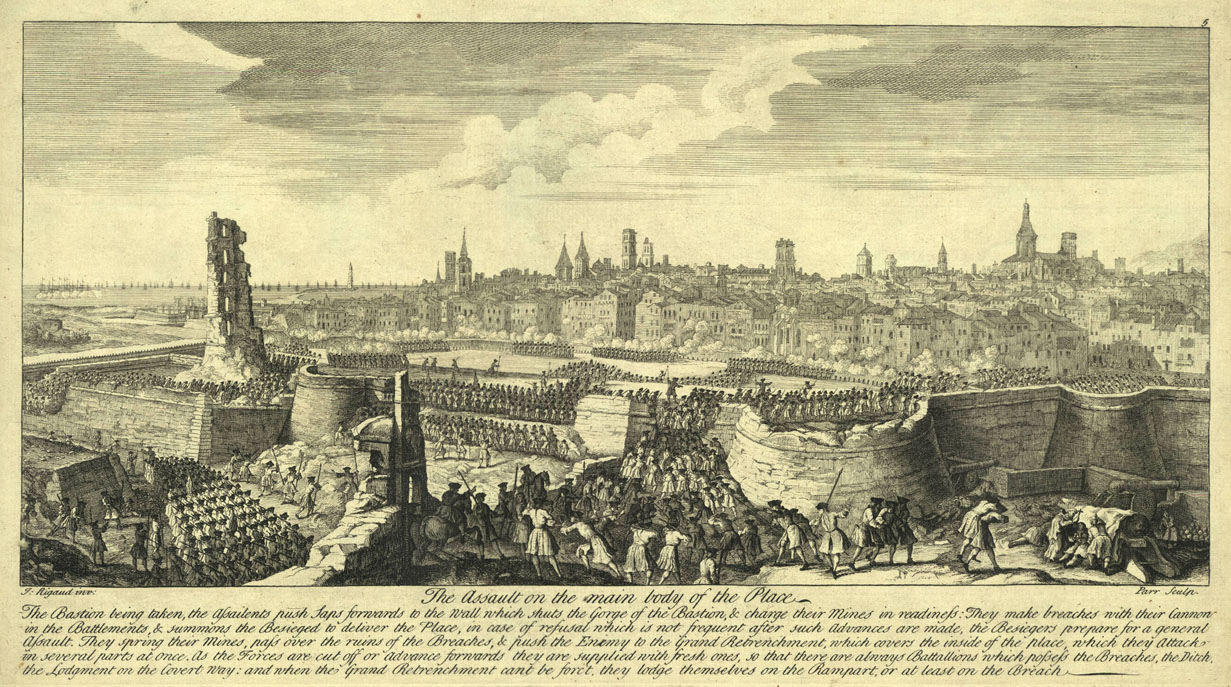
Depiction of the siege of Barcelona: The assault on the main body of the Place (1714) by Jacques Rigaud

- Second siege of Le Quesnoy (1712) – War of the Spanish Succession
- Siege of Bouchain (1712) – War of the Spanish Succession
- Siege of Gerona (1712–1713) – War of the Spanish Succession
- Siege of Tönning (1713–1714) – Great Northern War
- Siege of Landau (1713) – War of the Spanish Succession
- Siege of Barcelona (1713–14) – War of the Spanish Succession
- Siege of Freiburg (1713) – War of the Spanish Succession
- Siege of Gurdaspur (1715)
- Siege of Brahan (1715) – Jacobite rising of 1715
- Siege of Inverness (1715) – Jacobite rising of 1715

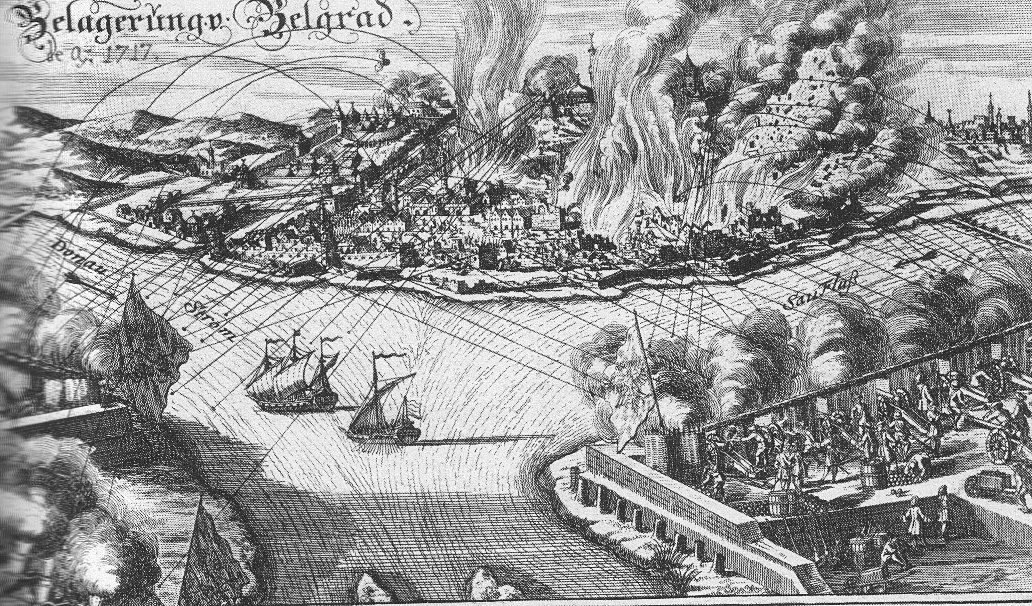
Austrian land and naval bombardment puts Belgrade in flames during the siege of 1717.

- Siege of Temeşvar (1716) – Austro-Turkish War (1716–1718)
- Siege of Belgrade (1717) – Austro-Turkish War (1716–1718)
- Siege of Fredriksten (1718) – Great Northern War
- Siege of Isfahan (1722)
- Thirteenth Siege of Gibraltar (1727) – by a Spanish army
- Siege of Oran (1732) – Conflicts between Spain and Algiers
- Siege of Kehl (1733) – War of the Polish Succession
- Siege of Pizzighettone (1733) – War of the Polish Succession
- Siege of Danzig (1734) – War of the Polish Succession
- Siege of Gaeta (1734) – War of the Polish Succession
- Siege of Trarbach (1734) – War of the Polish Succession
- Siege of Capua (1734) – War of the Polish Succession
- Siege of Philippsburg (1734) – War of the Polish Succession
- Siege of Messina (1734–1735) – War of the Polish Succession
- Siege of Ganja (1734–1735) – Ottoman–Persian War (1730–35)
- Siege of Syracuse (1735) – War of the Polish Succession
- Siege of Trapani (1735) – War of the Polish Succession
- Siege of Colonia del Sacramento (1735–1737) – Spanish–Portuguese War (1735–1737)
- Siege of Perekop (1736) – Russo-Turkish War (1735–1739)
- Siege of Azov (1736) – Russo-Turkish War (1735–1739)
- Siege of Banja Luka (1737) – Austro-Turkish War (1737–1739)
- Siege of Ochakov (1737) – Russo-Turkish War (1735–1739)
- Siege of Kandahar (1737–1738)
- Siege of Mehadia (1738) – Austro-Turkish War (1737–1739)
- Siege of Orsova (1738) – Austro-Turkish War (1737–1739)

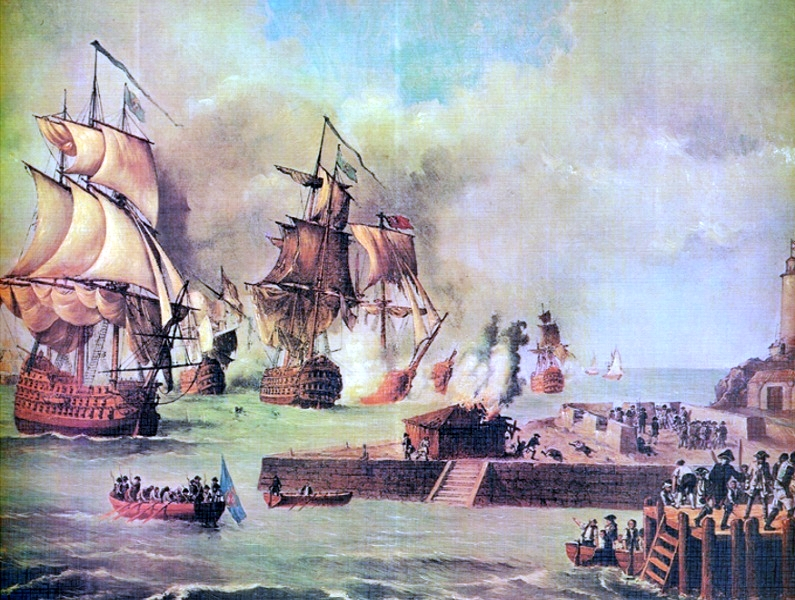
British attack on Cartagena de Indias (1741) by Luis Fernández Gordillo. Oil on canvas, Naval Museum of Madrid

- Siege of Belgrade (1739) – Austro-Turkish War (1737–1739)
- Siege of Portobello (1739) – victory of British siege by Edward Vernon in the War of Jenkins' Ear
- Siege of St. Augustine (1740) – War of Jenkins' Ear
- Siege of Fort Mose (1740) – War of Jenkins' Ear
- Siege of Trichinopoly (1741)
- Siege of Cartagena de Indias (1741) – failed British siege by Edward Vernon in the War of Jenkins' Ear
- Siege of Brieg (1741) – War of the Austrian Succession
- Siege of Santiago (1741) – War of the Austrian Succession
- Siege of Neisse (1741)
- Siege of Glatz (1742) – War of the Austrian Succession
- Siege of Eger (1742) – War of the Austrian Succession
- Siege of Mirandola (1742) – War of the Austrian Succession
- Siege of Modena (1742) – War of the Austrian Succession
- Siege of Prague (1742) – War of the Austrian Succession
- Siege of La Guaira (1743) – War of the Austrian Succession
- Siege of Eger (1743) – War of the Austrian Succession
- Siege of Puerto Cabello (1743) – War of the Austrian Succession
- Blockade of Straubing (1743) – War of the Austrian Succession
- Siege of Trichinopoly (1743)
- Siege of Ingolstadt (1743) – War of the Austrian Succession
- Siege of Mosul (1743) – Ottoman–Persian War (1743–46)
- Siege of Kars (1744) – Ottoman–Persian War (1743–46)
- Siege of Menin (1744) – War of the Austrian Succession
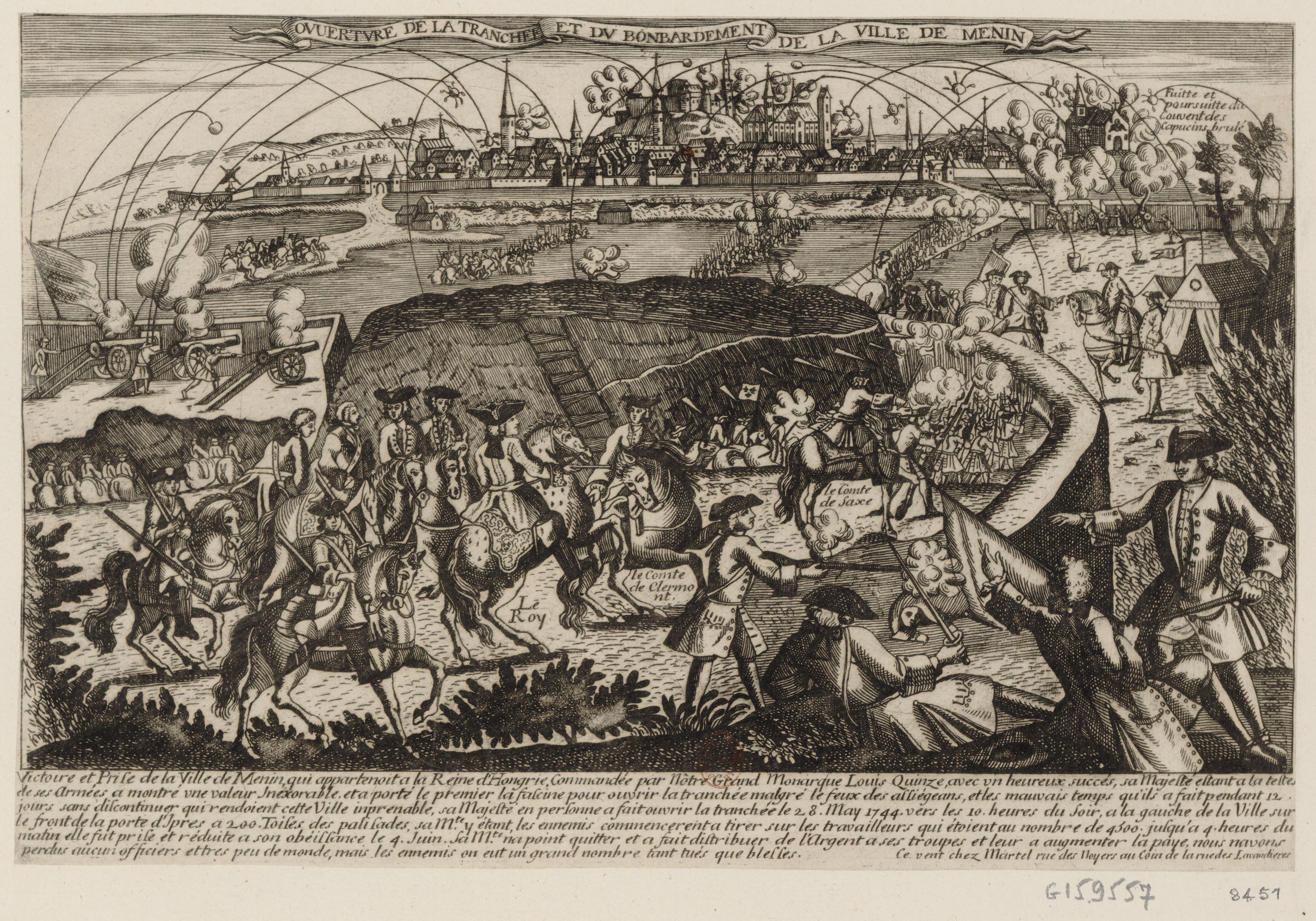
  The siege of Menen (1744) during the War of the Austrian Succession.
- Siege of Ypres (1744) – War of the Austrian Succession
- Siege of Furnes (1744) – War of the Austrian Succession
- Siege of Annapolis Royal (1744) – War of the Austrian Succession (King George's War)
- Siege of Prague (1744) – War of the Austrian Succession
- Siege of Cuneo (1744) – War of the Austrian Succession
- Siege of Freiburg (1744) – War of the Austrian Succession
- Siege of Tabor (1744) – War of the Austrian Succession
- Siege of Bankibazar (1744) –
- Siege of Tournai (1745) – War of the Austrian Succession
- Siege of Barabati (1745) – Fourth Maratha invasion of Bengal
- Siege of Louisbourg (1745) – War of the Austrian Succession (King George's War)
- Siege of Port Toulouse (1745) – War of the Austrian Succession (King George's War)
- Siege of Annapolis Royal (1745) – War of the Austrian Succession (King George's War)
- Fall of Ghent (1745) – War of the Austrian Succession
- Siege of Oudenarde (1745) – War of the Austrian Succession
- Siege of Ostend (1745) – War of the Austrian Succession
- Siege of Tortona (1745) – War of the Austrian Succession
- Siege of Kosel (1745) – War of the Austrian Succession
- Siege of Ruthven Barracks (1745) – Jacobite rising of 1745
- Siege of Culloden House (1745) – Jacobite rising of 1745
- Siege of Carlisle (November 1745) – Jacobite rising of 1745
- Siege of Carlisle (December 1745) – Jacobite rising of 1745
- Siege of Fort Augustus (December 1745) – Jacobite rising of 1745
- Siege of Stirling Castle (1746) – Jacobite rising of 1745
- Siege of Brussels (1746) – War of the Austrian Succession
- Siege of Ruthven Barracks (1746) – Jacobite rising of 1745
- Siege of Inverness (1746) – Jacobite rising of 1745
- Siege of Fort Augustus (March 1746) – Jacobite rising of 1745
- Siege of Blair Castle (1745) – Jacobite rising of 1745
- Siege of Fort William (1745) – Jacobite rising of 1745
- Siege of Genoa (1746) – War of the Austrian Succession
- Siege of Mons (1746) – War of the Austrian Succession

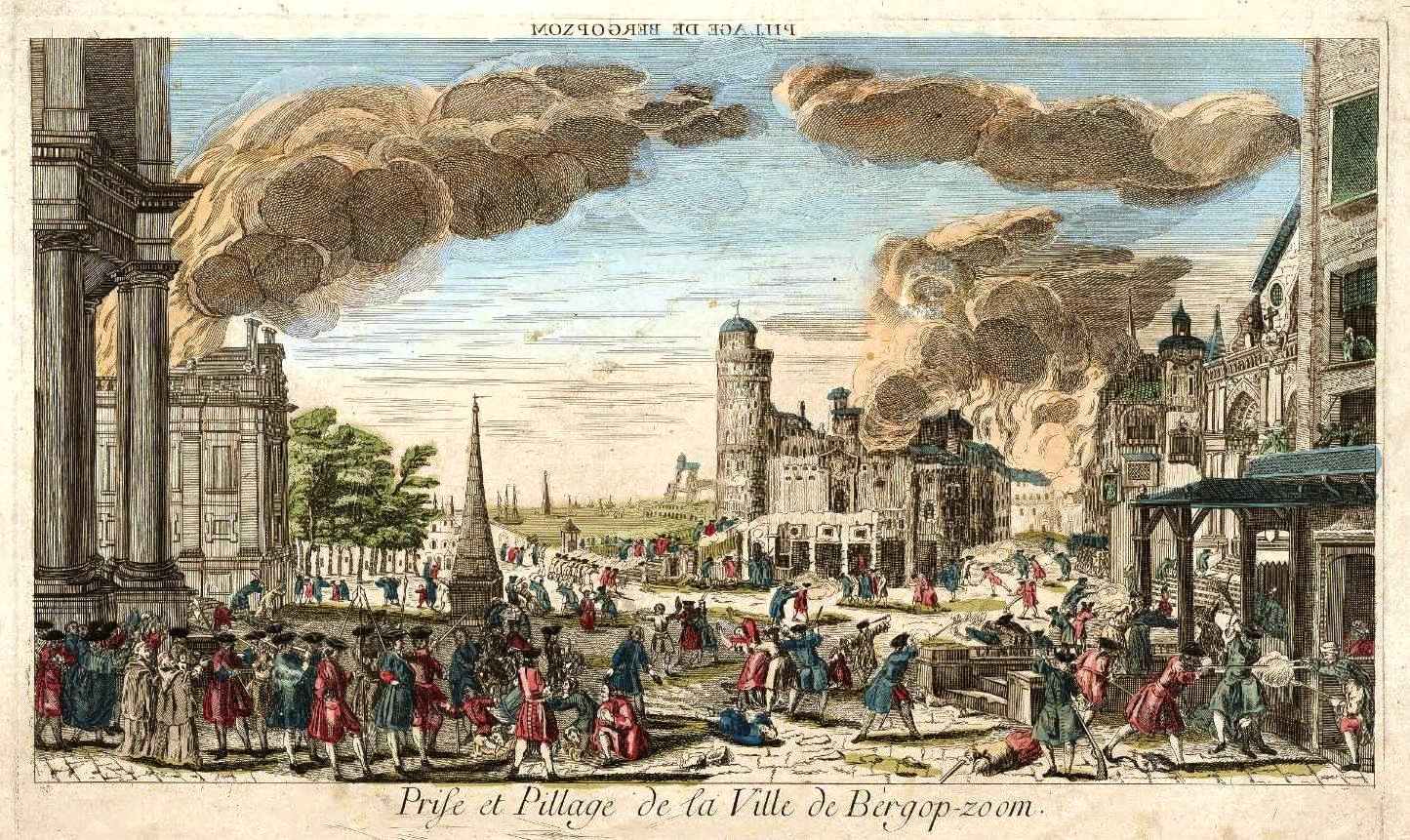
Conquest and pillage of Bergen-op-Zoom by the French in 1747.

- Siege of Namur (1746) – War of the Austrian Succession
- Siege of Madras (1746) – War of the Austrian Succession
- Siege of Genoa (1747) – War of the Austrian Succession
- Siege of Hulst (1747) – War of the Austrian Succession
- Siege of Bergen op Zoom (1747) – War of the Austrian Succession
- Siege of Maastricht (1748) – War of the Austrian Succession
- Siege of Cuddalore (1748) – War of the Austrian Succession
- Siege of Pondicherry (1748) – War of the Austrian Succession
- Siege of Arcot (1751) – Second Carnatic War
- Siege of Trichinopoly (1751–52) – second Carnatic War
- Siege of Fort St Philip (1756) – Seven Years' War
- Siege of Pirna (1756) – Seven Years' War
- Siege of Prague (1757) – Seven Years' War
- Siege of Fort William Henry (1757) – Seven Years' War (French and Indian War)
- Siege of Schweidnitz (1757) – Seven Years' War
- Siege of Breslau (1757) – Seven Years' War

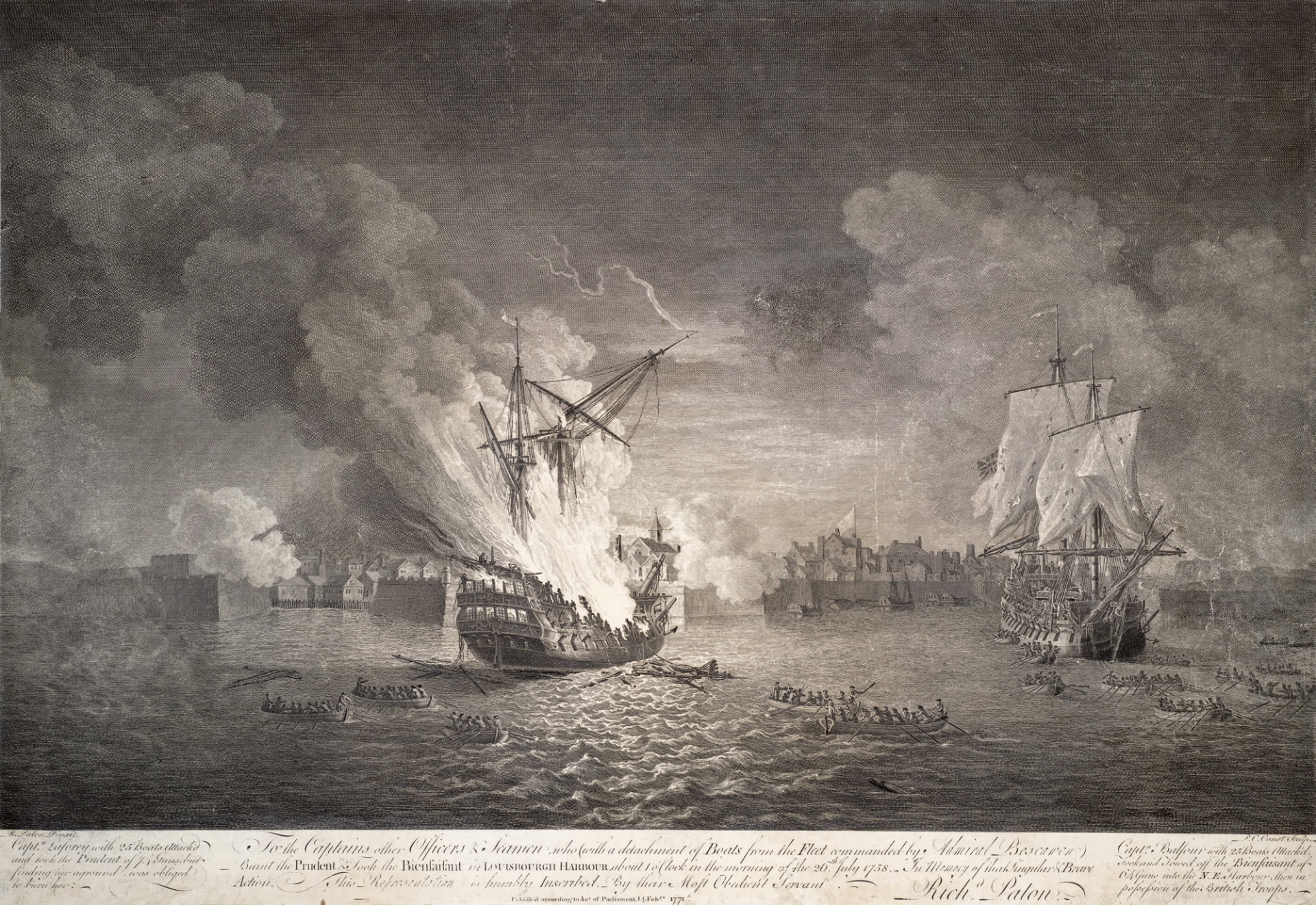
Siege of Louisbourg (1758): British burning of the warship Prudent and the capturing of the Bienfaisant.

- Blockade of Liegnitz (1757) – Seven Years' War
- Blockade of Stralsund (1757–1758) – Seven Years' War
- Siege of Küstrin (1758) – Seven Years' War
- Siege of Schweidnitz (1758) – Seven Years' War
- Siege of Louisbourg (1758) – Seven Years' War (French and Indian War)
- Siege of Olmütz (1758) – by the Prussian army of Frederick the Great during the Seven Years' War
- Siege of Neisse (1758) – Seven Years' War
- Siege of Madras (1758–1759) – Seven Years' War
- Siege of Masulipatam (1759) – Seven Years' War
- Siege of Québec (1759) – second siege of Québec, during the Seven Years' War (French and Indian War)
- Siege of Münster (1759) – Seven Years' War
- Second siege of Münster (1759) – Seven Years' War
- Siege of Fort Loudoun (1760) – Seven Years' War (French and Indian War)
- Siege of Glatz (1760) – Seven Years' War
- Siege of Dresden (1760) – Seven Years' War

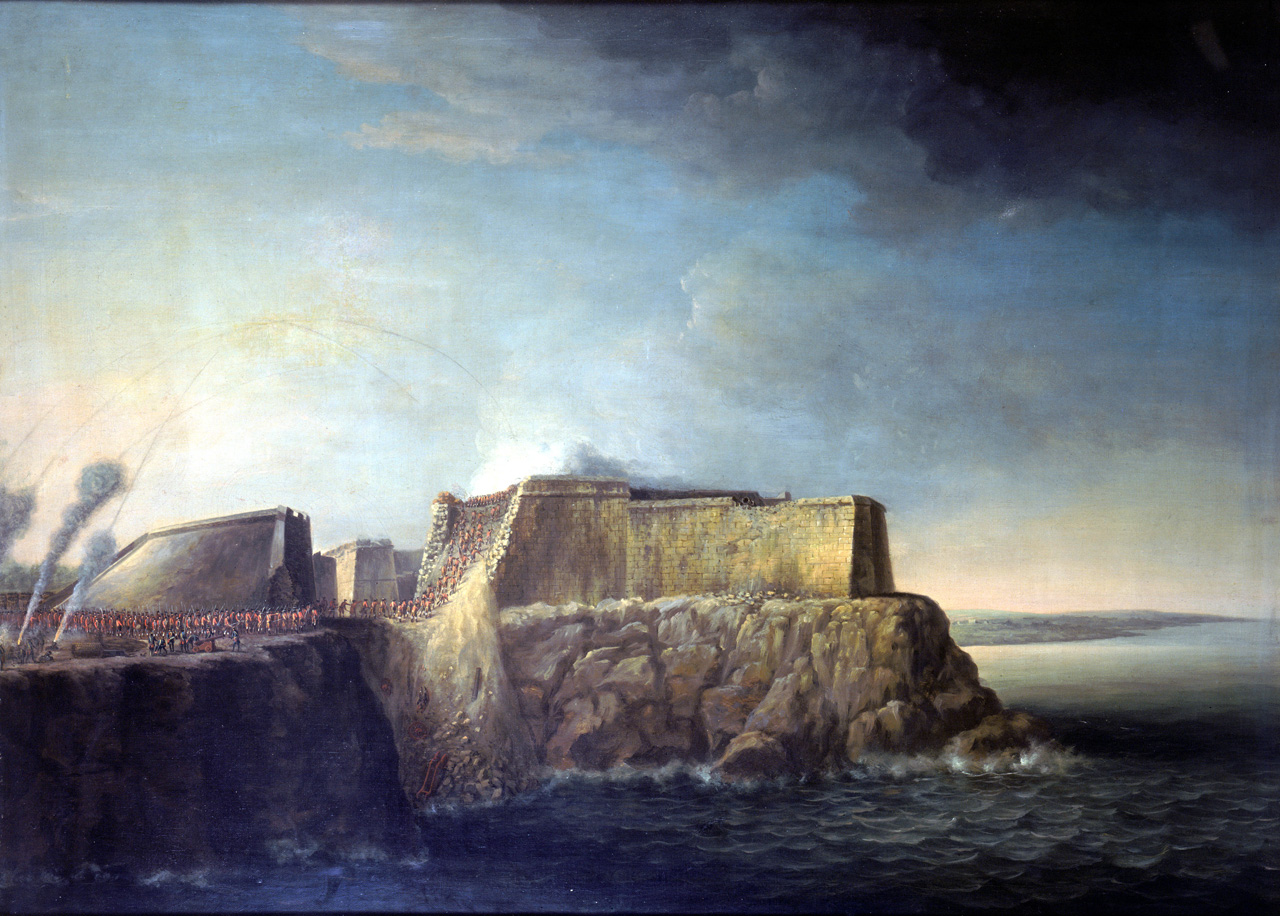
The Capture of Havana, 1762: Storming of Morro Castle, 30 July by Dominic Serres, oil on canvas (1770–1775)

- Siege of Breslau (1760) – Seven Years' War
- Siege of Wittenberg (1760) – Seven Years' War
- Siege of Pondicherry (1760–1761) – Seven Years' War
- Siege of Cassel (1761) – Seven Years' War
- Sieges of Kolberg (1759, 1760, and 1761) – Seven Years' War
- Siege of Havana (1762) – Seven Years' War. British fleet headed by George Keppel, 3rd Earl of Albemarle lays siege to Spanish controlled Havana for a month.
- Siege of Schweidnitz (1762) – Seven Years' War
- Siege of Almeida (1762) – Seven Years' War
- Siege of Cassel (1762) – Seven Years' War
- Siege of Ayutthaya (1767) – Burmese–Siamese War (1765–1767)
- Siege of Ambur (1767) – First Anglo-Mysore War

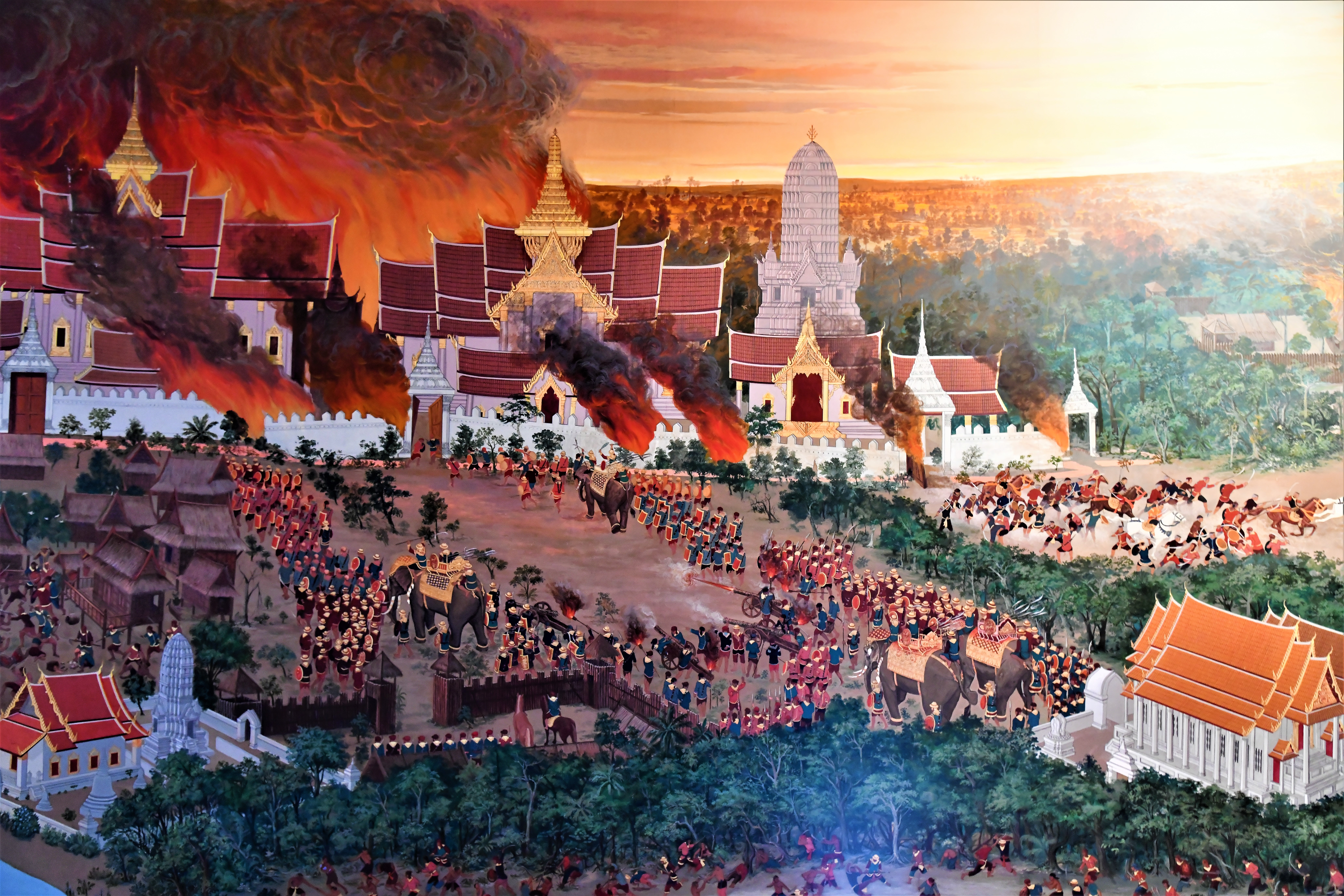
Fall of Ayutthaya, Siam, 7 April 1767

- Siege of Khotyn (1769) – Russo-Turkish War (1768–1774)
- Siege of Bender (1770) – Russo-Turkish War (1768–1774)
- Siege of Giurgevo (1771) – Russo-Turkish War (1768–1774)
- Siege of Silistria (1773) – Russo-Turkish War (1768–1774)
- Siege of Melilla (1774), during Hispano-Moroccan wars
- Siege of Boston (1775–1776) – American Revolutionary War
- Siege of Fort St. Jean (1775) – American Revolutionary War
- Siege of Fort Ticonderoga (1777) – American Revolutionary War
- Siege of Fort Stanwix (1777) – American Revolutionary War
- Siege of Fort Henry (1777) – American Revolutionary War
- Siege of Fort Mifflin (1777) – American Revolutionary War

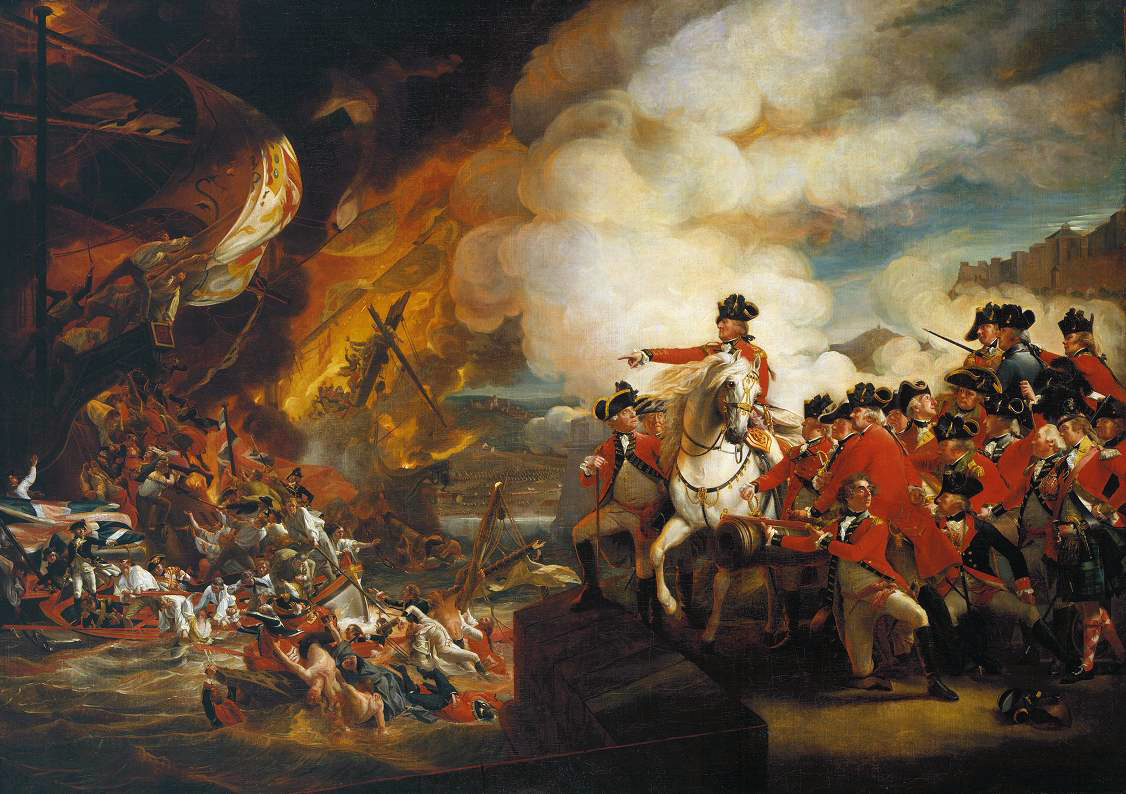
The Defeat of the Floating Batteries at Gibraltar, September 1782

- Siege of Pondicherry (1778) – Anglo-French War (1778–1783)
- Siege of Fort Vincennes (1779) – American Revolutionary War
- Great Siege of Gibraltar (1779–83) – fourteenth siege of Gibraltar, by a Spanish–French army in the American Revolutionary War
- Siege of Savannah (1779) – American Revolutionary War
- Siege of Tellicherry (1779–82) – Second Anglo-Mysore War
- Siege of Charleston (1780) – American Revolutionary War
- Siege of Kastania (1780)
- Siege of Vellore (1780–82) – second Anglo-Mysore War
- Siege of Cuzco (1780) – Tupac Amaru Rebellion
- Siege of La Plata (1781) – Tupac Amaru Rebellion
- First Siege of La Paz (1781) – Tupac Amaru Rebellion
- Second Siege of La Paz (1781) – Tupac Amaru Rebellion
- Siege of Sorata (1781) – Tupac Amaru Rebellion

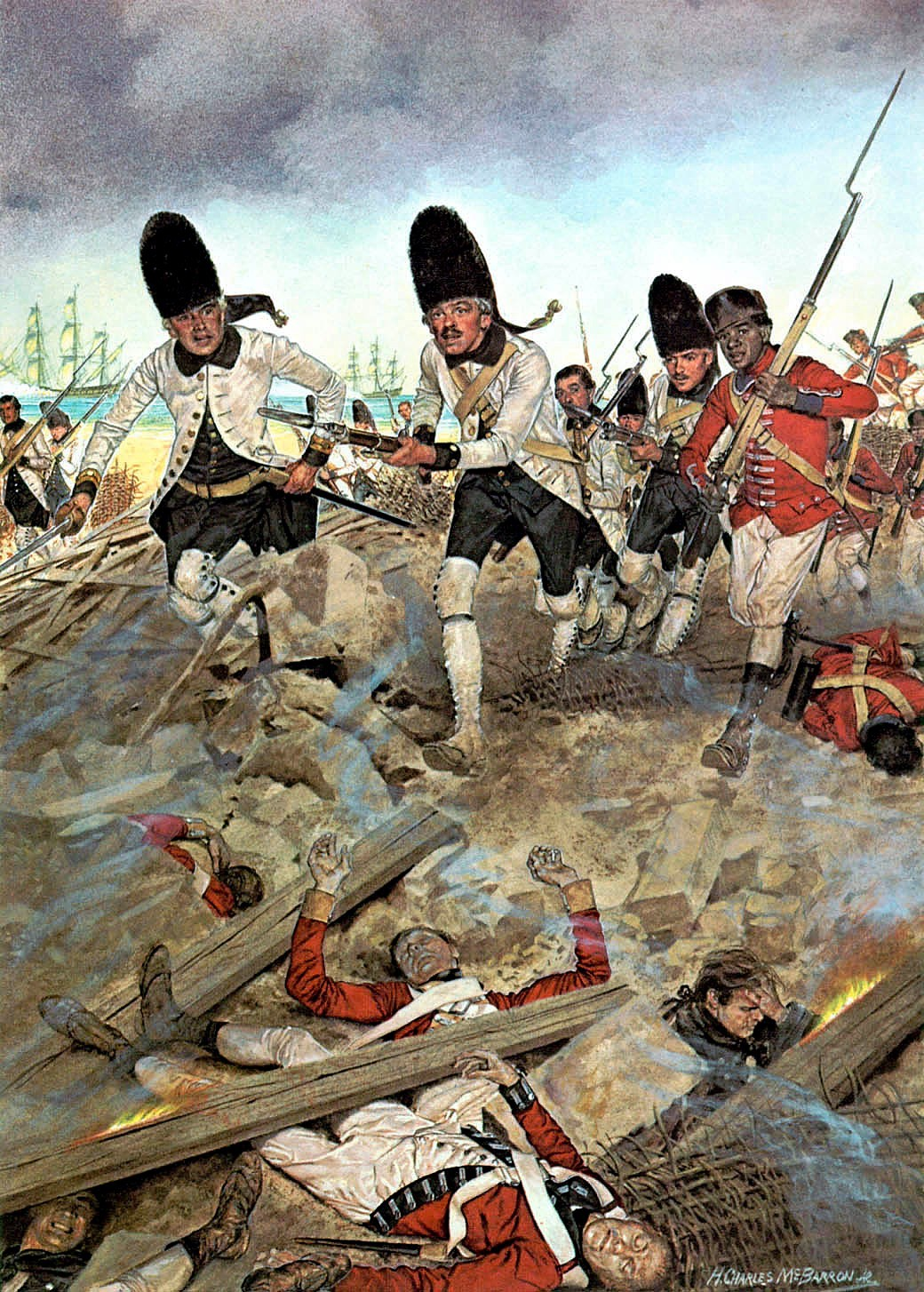
Spanish grenadiers pour into Fort George (Pensacola, Florida) (1781)

- Siege of Pensacola (1781) – American Revolutionary War
- Siege of Fort Watson (1781) – American Revolutionary War
- Siege of Fort Motte (1781) – American Revolutionary War
- Siege of Augusta (1781) – American Revolutionary War
- Siege of Ninety-Six (1781) – American Revolutionary War
- Siege of Yorktown (1781) – American Revolutionary War
- Siege of Negapatam (1781) – fourth Anglo-Dutch War
- Siege of Brimstone Hill (1782) – Anglo-French War (1778–1783)
- Siege of Fort Henry (1782) – American Revolutionary War
- Siege of Cuddalore (1783) – second Anglo-Mysore War
- Siege of Mangalore (1783–1784) – second Anglo-Mysore War
- Siege of Nargund (1785) – Maratha–Mysore War
- Siege of Karginsk (1785) — Sheikh Mansur Movement
- Siege of Kizlyar (July 1785) — Sheikh Mansur Movement
- Battle of Grigoriopolis 1785 — Sheikh Mansur Movement
- Siege of Kizlyar (August 1785) — Sheikh Mansur Movement
- Siege of Badami (1786) – Maratha–Mysore War
- Siege of Bahadur Benda (1787) – Maratha–Mysore War
- Siege of Ochakov (1788) – Russo-Turkish War (1787–1792)
- Siege of Khotin (1788) – Austro-Turkish War (1788–1791)
- Siege of Anapa (1788) — Sheikh Mansur Movement

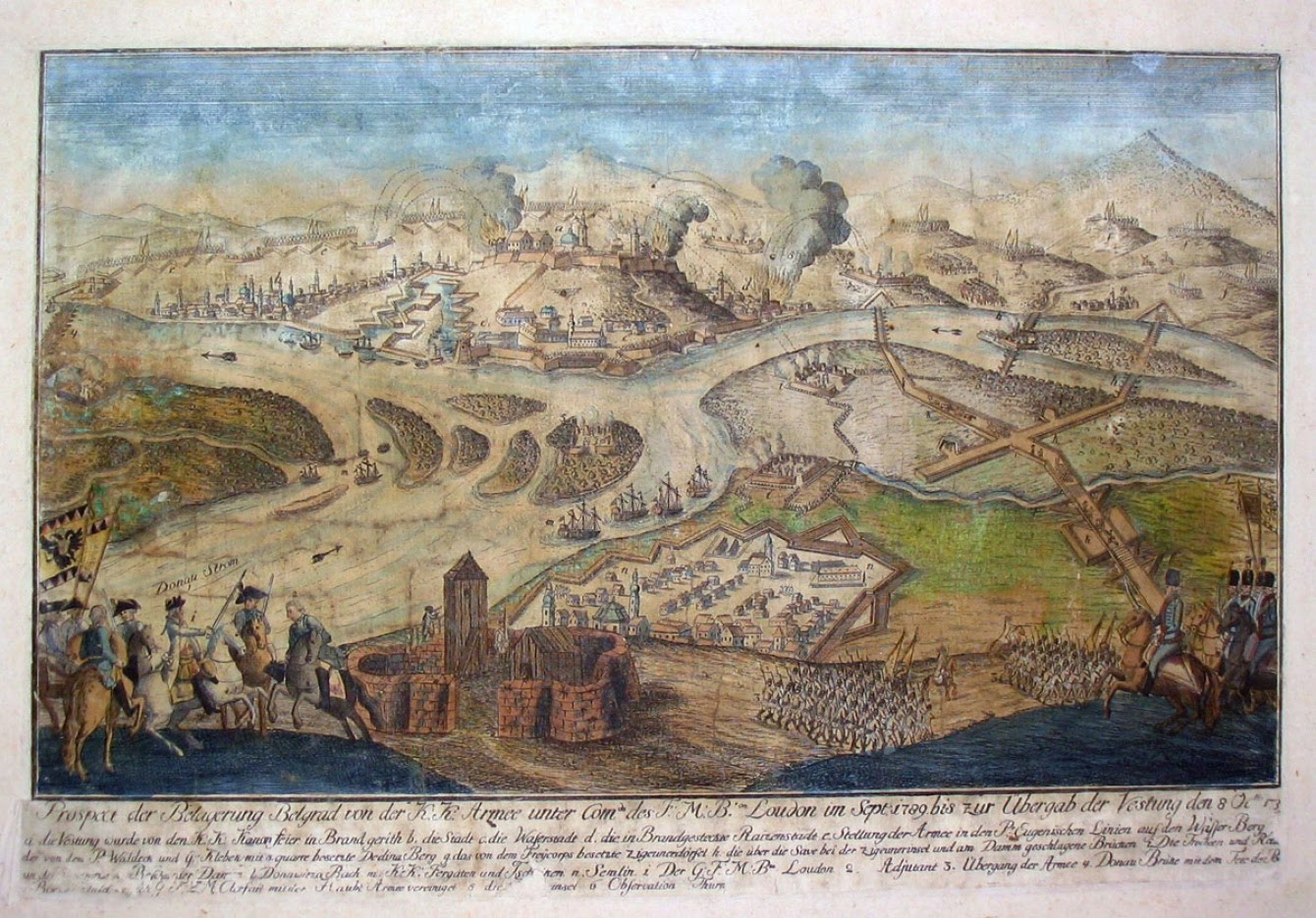
Siege of Belgrade in 1789 by the Habsburg army

- Siege of Belgrade (1789) – Austro-Turkish War (1788–1791)
- Siege of Izmail (1789–1790) – Russo-Turkish War (1787–1792)
- Siege of Oran (1790–1792) – Conflicts between Spain and Algiers
- Siege of Anapa (1790) — Sheikh Mansur Movement
- Siege of Darwar (1790–1791) – third Anglo-Mysore War
- Siege of Koppal (1790–1791) – third Anglo-Mysore War
- Siege of Bangalore (1791) – third Anglo-Mysore War
- Siege of Coimbatore (1791) – third Anglo-Mysore War
- Siege of Anapa (1791) — Sheikh Mansur Movement
- Siege of Goorumconda (1791) – third Anglo-Mysore War

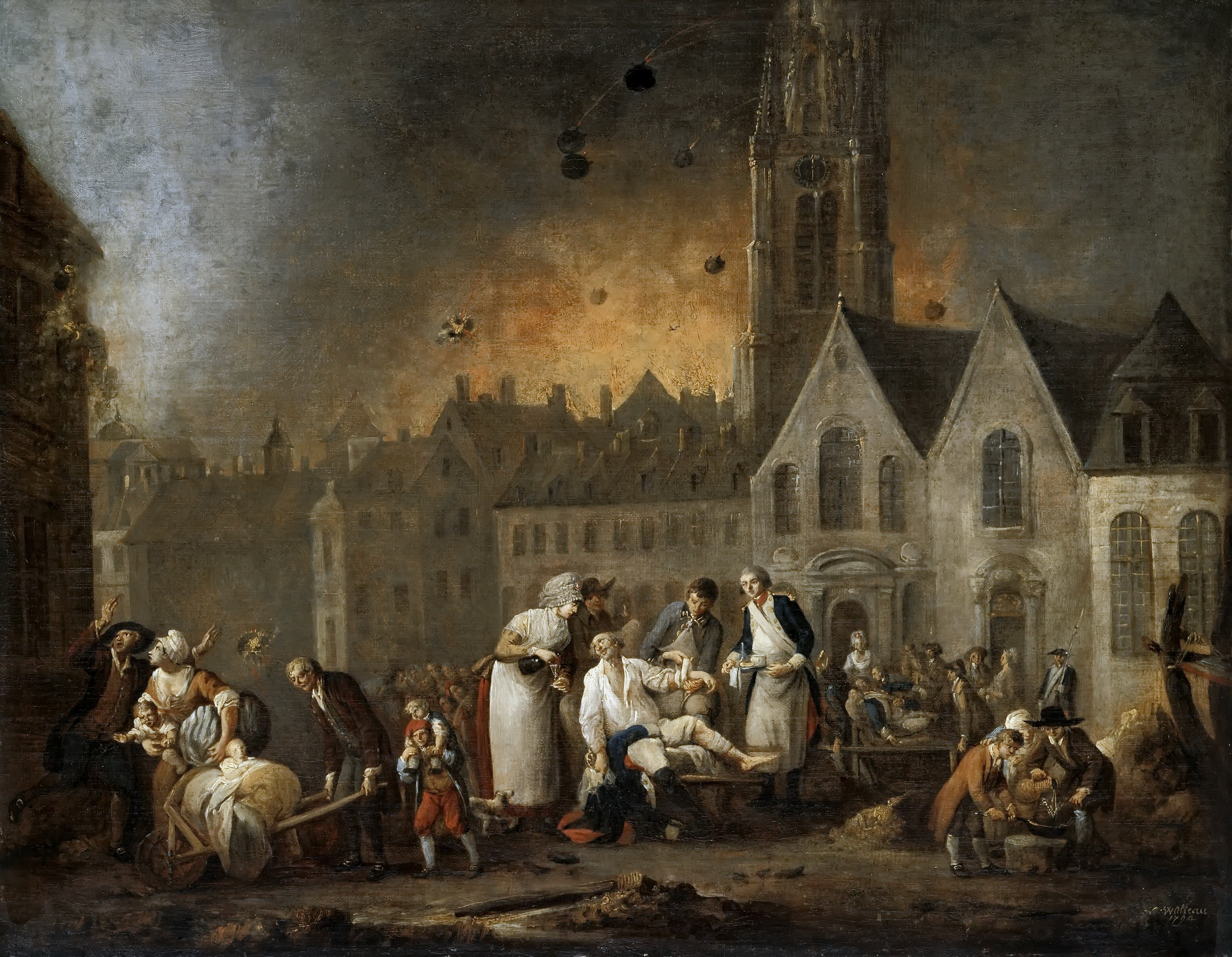
Siege of Lille (1792) by Louis Joseph Watteau

- Siege of Nundydroog (1791) – third Anglo-Mysore War
- Siege of Savendroog (1791) – third Anglo-Mysore War
- Siege of Seringapatam (1792) – third Anglo-Mysore War
- Siege of Thionville (1792) – War of the First Coalition
- Battle of Verdun (1792) – War of the First Coalition
- Siege of Lille (1792) – War of the First Coalition
- Siege of Mainz (1792) – War of the First Coalition
- Battle of Limburg (1792) – War of the First Coalition
- Siege of Maastricht (1793) – War of the First Coalition
- Siege of Condé (1793) – War of the First Coalition
- Siege of Mainz (1793) – War of the First Coalition
- Siege of Bellegarde (1793) – War of the First Coalition
- Siege of Valenciennes (1793) – War of the First Coalition
- Siege of Pondicherry (1793) – War of the First Coalition
- Siege of Lyon (1793) – War of the First Coalition
- Siege of Landau (1793) – War of the First Coalition

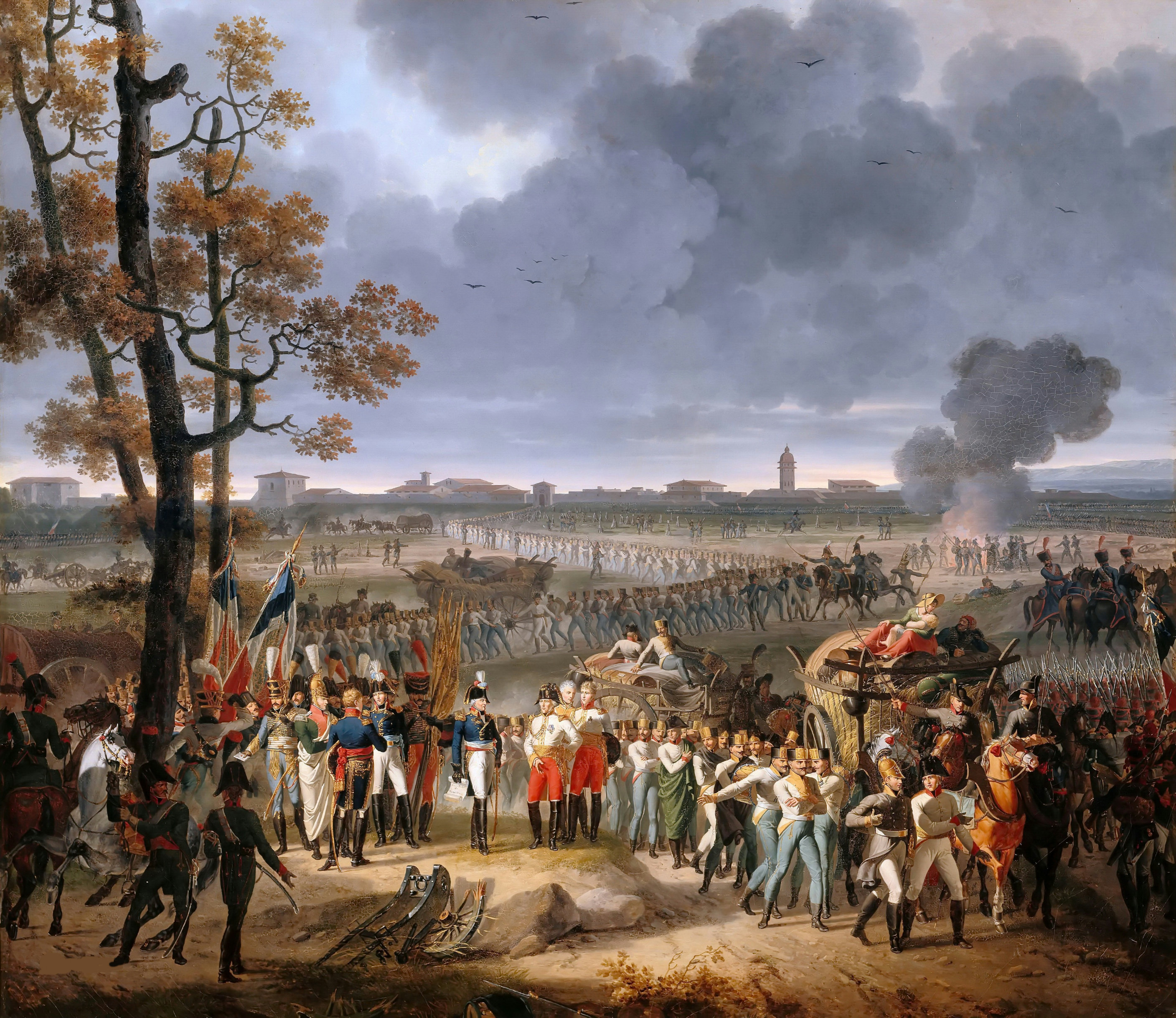
The capitulation of Mantua on 2 February 1797, Hippolyte Lecomte, 1812

- Siege of Dunkirk (1793) – War of the First Coalition
- Siege of Le Quesnoy (1793) – War of the First Coalition
- Siege of Toulon (1793) – War of the First Coalition
- Siege of Maubeuge (1793) – War of the First Coalition
- Siege of Fort-Louis (1793) – War of the First Coalition
- Siege of Angers (1793) – War of the First Coalition
- Siege of San Fiorenzo (1794) – War of the First Coalition
- Siege of Bastia (1794) – War of the First Coalition
- Siege of Landrecies (1794) – War of the First Coalition
- Siege of Collioure (1794) – War of the First Coalition
- Siege of Ypres (1794) – War of the First Coalition
- Siege of Calvi (1794) – War of the First Coalition
- Siege of Luxembourg (1794–95) – War of the First Coalition
- Siege of Roses (1794–95) – War of the First Coalition

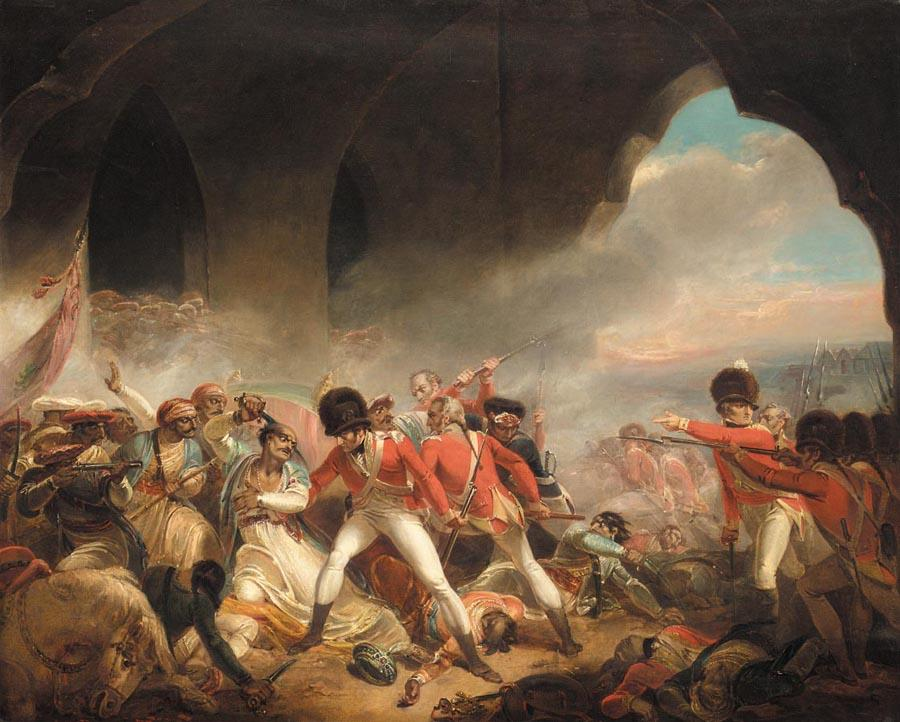
The Last Effort and Fall of Tippoo Sultaun (1799) by Henry Singleton

- Siege of Mannheim (1795) – War of the First Coalition
- Siege of Mantua (1796–97) – War of the First Coalition, French besieging
- Siege of Kehl (1796–97) – War of the First Coalition
- Siege of Hüningen (1796–97) – War of the First Coalition
- Siege of Port of Spain (1797), during the Anglo-Spanish War
- Siege of San Juan de Puerto Rico (1797), during the Anglo-Spanish War
- Siege of Malta (1798–1800), during the French Revolutionary Wars
- Siege of Corfu (1798–99) – War of the Second Coalition
- Siege of El Arish (1799) – French campaign in Egypt and Syria
- Siege of Jaffa (1799) – French campaign in Egypt and Syria
- Siege of Acre (1799) – French campaign in Egypt and Syria
- Siege of Mantua (1799) – War of the Second Coalition
- Siege of Seringapatam (1799) – Fourth Anglo-Mysore War
- Siege of Genoa (1800) – War of the Second Coalition
- Siege of Fort Bard (1800) – War of the Second Coalition
- Siege of Curazao (1800) – War of the Second Coalition)

== Modern military sieges ==
=== 19th century ===
- Siege of Fort Julien (1801) – French campaign in Egypt and Syria
- Siege of Cairo (1801) – French campaign in Egypt and Syria
- Siege of Porto Ferrajo (1801) – War of the Second Coalition
- Siege of Alexandria (1801) – French campaign in Egypt and Syria
- Siege of Ahmednagar (1803) – Second Anglo-Maratha War
- Siege of Aligarh (1803) – second Anglo-Maratha War
- Siege of Erivan (1804) – Russo-Persian War (1804–13)
- Siege of Delhi (1804) – second Anglo-Maratha War
- Siege of Deeg (1804) – second Anglo-Maratha War

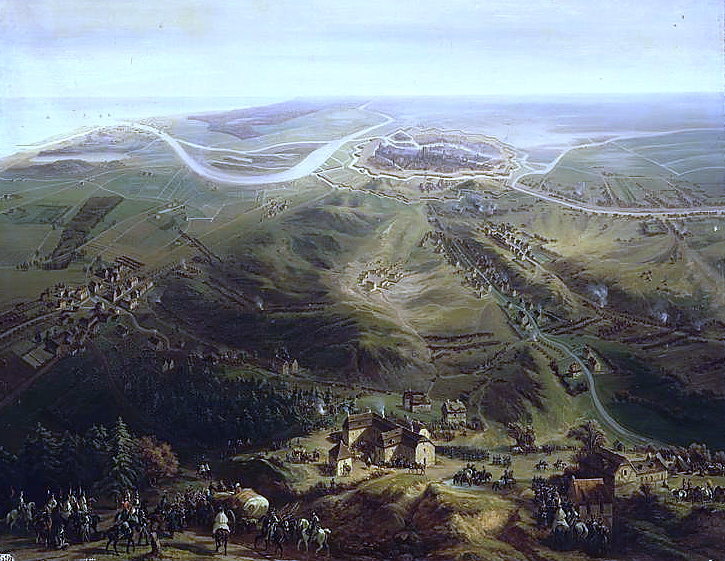
Siege of Gdańsk by French forces in 1807

- Siege of Bharatpur (1805) – second Anglo-Maratha War
- Siege of Santo Domingo (1805)
- Siege of Buenos Aires (1806) – during the British invasions of the River Plate
- Siege of Gaeta (1806) – Invasion of Naples (1806)
- Siege of Magdeburg (1806) – War of the Fourth Coalition
- Siege of Belgrade (1806) – First Serbian uprising
- Siege of Hameln (1806) – War of the Fourth Coalition
- Siege of Stralsund (1807) – War of the Fourth Coalition
- Siege of Montevideo (1807) – during the British invasions of the River Plate
- Siege of Kolberg (1807) – War of the Fourth Coalition
- Siege of Danzig (1807) – War of the Fourth Coalition, French siege of Prussians and Russians
- Siege of Buenos Aires (1807) – during the British invasions of the River Plate
- Battle of Copenhagen (1807) – Bombarded by British fleet and by ground forces commanded by Arthur Wellesley

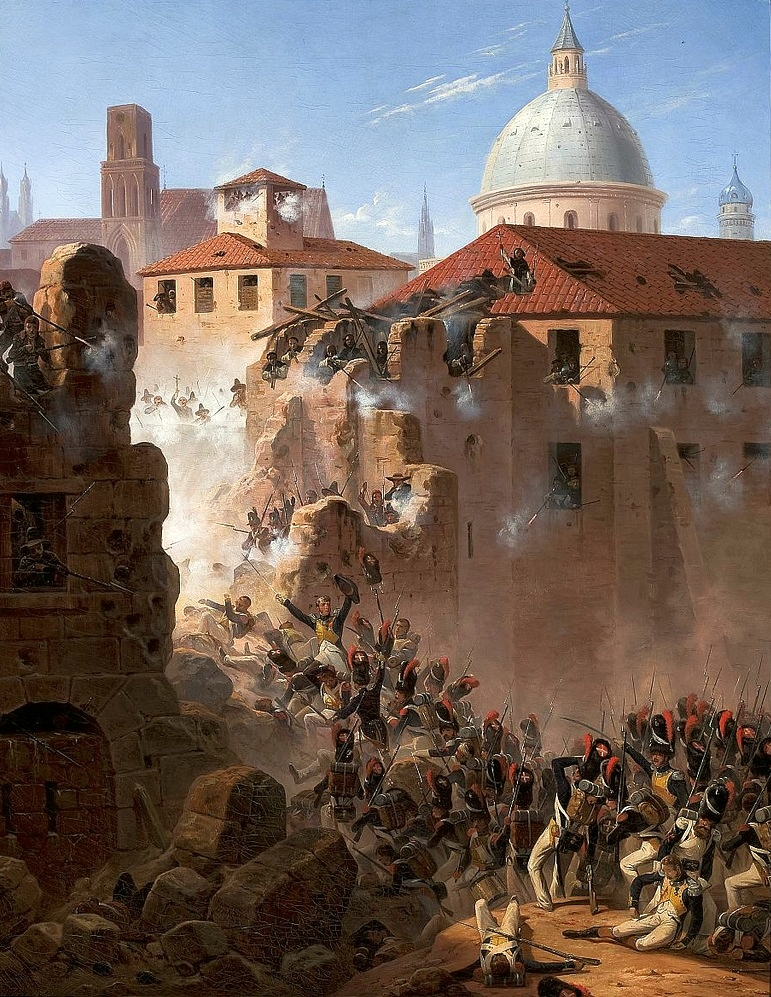
Assault on the walls of Zaragoza by January Suchodolski

- Siege of Sveaborg (1808) – Finnish War
- Siege of Erivan (1808) – Russo-Persian War (1804–13)
- First siege of Zaragoza (1808) – Peninsular War
- Siege of Barcelona (1808) – Peninsular War
- Battle of Valencia (1808) – Peninsular War
- Second siege of Gerona (1808) – Peninsular War
- Siege of Roses (1808) – Peninsular War
- Second siege of Zaragoza (1808–1809) – Peninsular War
- Siege of Chaves (1809) – Peninsular War
- Third siege of Girona (1809) – Peninsular War
- Siege of Cádiz (1810–1812) – Peninsular War
- Siege of Santa Maura (1810) – Adriatic campaign
- Siege of Astorga (1810) – Peninsular War
- Siege of Lérida (1810) – Peninsular War
- First siege of Ciudad Rodrigo (1810) – Peninsular War by the French Marshal Michel Ney
- Siege of Mequinenza (1810) – Peninsular War
- Siege of Almeida (1810) – Peninsular War
- Siege of Tortosa (1810–11) – Peninsular War
- Siege of Olivenza (1811) – Peninsular War
- First siege of Badajoz (1811) – Peninsular War
- Siege of Figueras (1811) – Peninsular War
- Second siege of Badajoz (1811) – Peninsular War
- Siege of Tarragona (1811) – Peninsular War
- Siege of La Alhóndiga (1810) – Spanish American wars of independence
- Siege of Valencia (Venezuela) (es) (1811) – Spanish American wars of independence
- Siege of La Paz (1811) – Spanish American wars of independence
- First siege of Montevideo (1811) – Spanish American wars of independence
- Siege of Tarifa (1811–1812) – Peninsular War
- Siege of Valencia (1811–1812) – Peninsular War
- Second siege of Montevideo (1812–14) – Spanish American wars of independence
- Second siege of Ciudad Rodrigo (1812) – Peninsular War by Arthur Wellesley
- Siege of Cuautla (1812) – Mexican War of Independence
- Siege of Badajoz (1812) – Peninsular War
- Siege of Huajuapan de León (1812) – Mexican War of Independence
- Siege of the Salamanca Forts (1812) – Peninsular War
- Siege of Astorga (1812) – Peninsular War
- First siege of Puerto Cabello (es) (1812) – Spanish American wars of independence

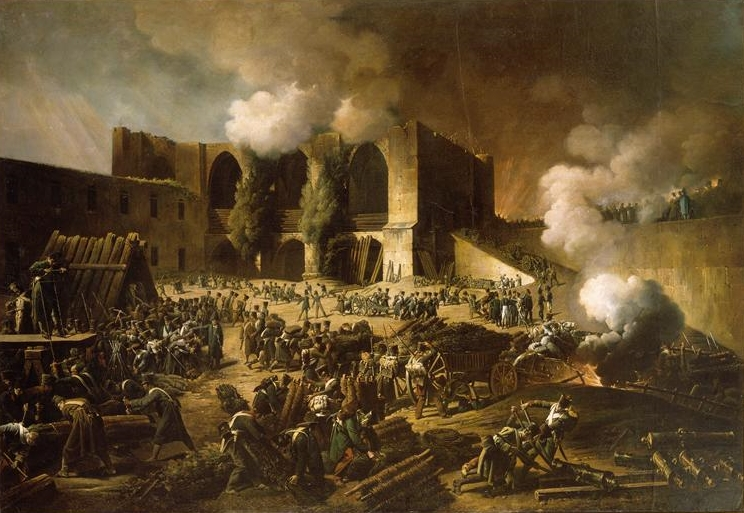
The Siege of Burgos (1812) by François Joseph Heim.

- Siege of Riga (1812) – French invasion of Russia
- Siege of Fort Mackinac (1812) – War of 1812
- Siege of Detroit (1812) – War of 1812
- Siege of Fort Harrison (1812) – War of 1812
- Siege of Fort Wayne (1812) – War of 1812
- Siege of Burgos (1812) – Peninsular War
- Siege of Danzig (1813) – War of the Sixth Coalition
- Siege of Acapulco (1813) – Mexican War of Independence
- Siege of Fort Meigs (1813) – failed British siege of American garrison during the War of 1812
- Siege of Tarragona (1813) – Peninsular War
- Siege of Pamplona (1813) – Peninsular War
- Siege of San Sebastián (1813) – Peninsular War
- Siege of Chillán (1813) – Chilean War of Independence
- Second siege of Puerto Cabello (es) (1813) – Spanish American wars of independence
- Siege of Cattaro (1813–1814) – War of the Sixth Coalition
- Siege of Mainz (1813–1814) – War of the Sixth Coalition
- Siege of Zara (1813) – War of the Sixth Coalition
- Siege of Maturin (es) (1813–1814) – Spanish American wars of independence
- Siege of Hamburg (1813–1814) – War of the Sixth Coalition
- Siege of Metz (1814) – War of the Sixth Coalition
- Third siege of Puerto Cabello (es) (1814) – Spanish American wars of independence
- Siege of Antwerp (1814) – War of the Sixth Coalition
- Siege of Ragusa (1814) – War of the Sixth Coalition
- Siege of Bergen op Zoom (1814) – War of the Sixth Coalition
- First siege of Valencia (Venezuela) (es) (1814) – Spanish American wars of independence
- Second siege of Valencia (Venezuela) (es) (1814) – Spanish American wars of independence
- Siege of Prairie du Chien (1814) – War of 1812
- Siege of Fort Erie (1814) – War of 1812
- Siege of Aragua de Barcelona (es) (1814) – Spanish American wars of independence
- Siege of Santa Fe de Bogotá (es) (1814) – Spanish American wars of independence
- Siege of Ancona (1815) – Neapolitan War
- Siege of Gaeta (1815) – Neapolitan War
- Siege of Cartagena de Indias (es) (1815) – Spanish American wars of independence
- First siege of Angostura (es) (1817) – Spanish American wars of independence
- Siege of Barcelona (1817) – Spanish American wars of independence
- Second siege of Angostura (es) (1817) – Spanish American wars of independence
- Siege of Cartagena de Indias (es) (1820–21) – Spanish American wars of independence
- First siege of El Callao (es) (1821) – Spanish American wars of independence
- Siege of Veracruz (1821) – Spanish American wars of independence
- Siege of Tripolitsa (1821) – by the Greeks against the Ottomans, during the Greek War of Independence
- Siege of the Acropolis (1821–22) – by the Greeks against the Ottomans, during the Greek War of Independence
- Fourth siege of Puerto Cabello (es) (1822) – Spanish American wars of independence
- Siege of Pasto (es) (1822) – Spanish American wars of independence
- Fifth Siege of Puerto Cabello (1823) – Spanish American wars of independence
- Siege of Pamplona (1823) – 1823 French invasion of Spain
- First, second, and third sieges of Missolonghi (1822, 1823, 1825–1826)
- Second siege of El Callao (es) (1824–1826) – Spanish American wars of independence
- Siege of the Acropolis (1826–27) – by the Ottomans against the Greeks, during the Greek War of Independence
- Siege of Antwerp (1832) – conducted by French forces against a Dutch garrison after the Ten Days' Campaign.
- Siege of Jerusalem (1834) Peasants' Revolt of 1834 (Palestine)
- Siege of Puerto Cabello (es) (1835) – Reforms Revolution (Venezuela)
- Siege of the Alamo (1836) – Texas Revolution
- Siege of Herat (1837–38)
- Siege of Akmolinsk (1838)
- Siege of Aktau (1838)
- Third siege of El Callao (es) (1838)
- Siege of Akhoulgo (1839)
- Great Siege of Montevideo (1843–1851)
- Siege of Fort Texas (1846) – Mexican–American War

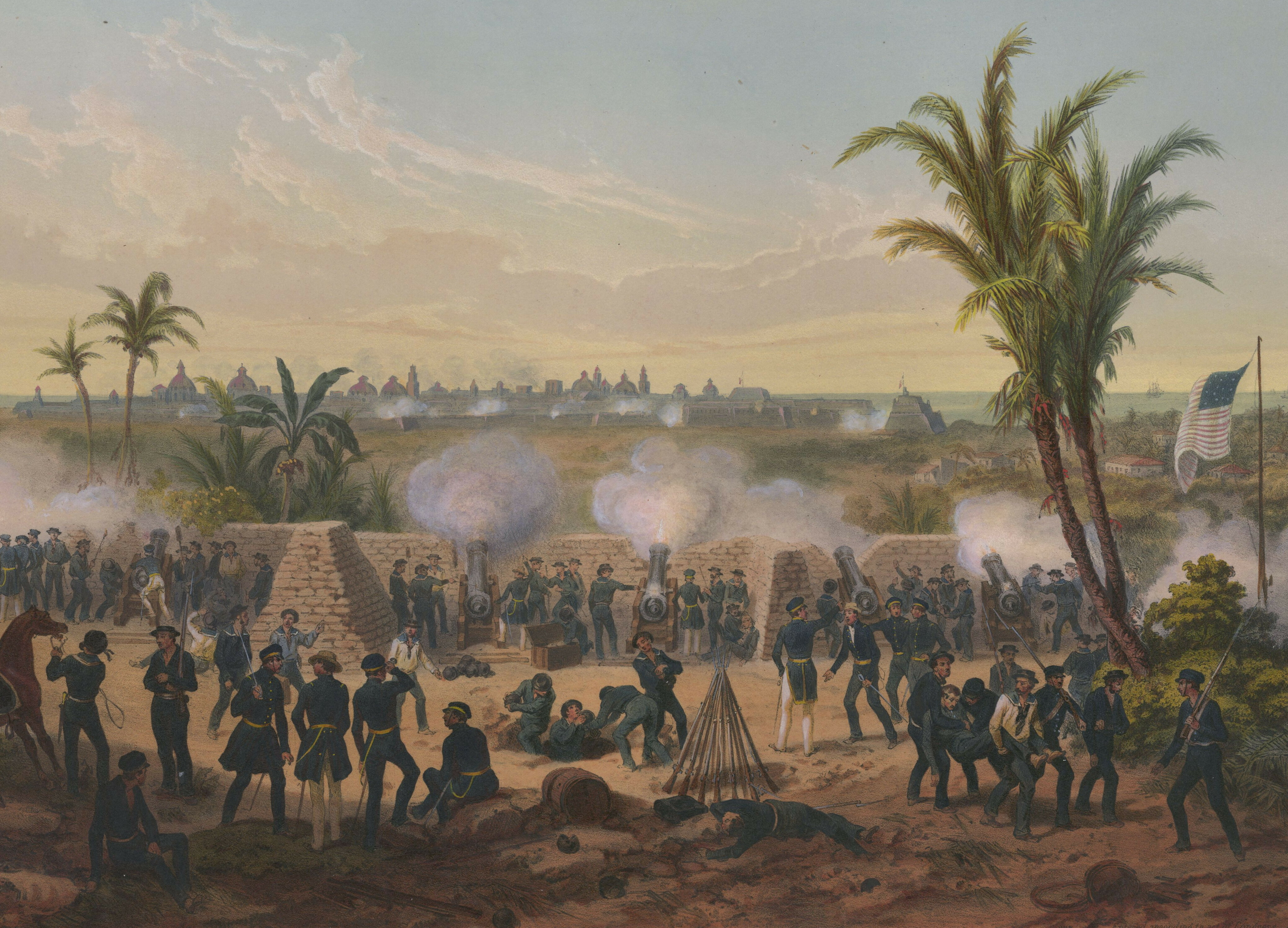
American troops besieging Veracruz during the Mexican–American War

- Siege of Los Angeles (1846) – Mexican–American War
- Siege of Pueblo de Taos (1847) – Mexican–American War
- Siege of Puebla (1847) – Mexican–American War
- Siege of Veracruz (1847) – Mexican–American War. First U.S. amphibious landing
- Siege of Messina (1848) – Sicilian revolution of 1848
- Siege of San José del Cabo (1848) – Mexican–American War
- Siege of Peschiera del Garda (1848) – Italian Risorgimento
- Siege of Osoppo (1848) – Italian Risorgimento
- Siege of Pétervárad (1848–49) – Hungarian Revolution of 1848–49
- Siege of Arad (1848–49) – Hungarian Revolution of 1848–49
- Siege of Komárom (1848–49) – Hungarian Revolution of 1848–49 (temporarily relieved after the Spring Campaign)
- Siege of Lipótvár (1848–49) – Hungarian Revolution of 1848–49
- Siege of Déva (1849) – Hungarian Revolution of 1848–49
- Siege of Eszék (1849) – Hungarian Revolution of 1848–49
- Siege of Gyulafehérvár (1849) – Hungarian Revolution of 1848–49
- Siege of Venice (1849) – Italian Risorgimento
- Siege of Buda (1849) – during the Hungarian Revolution of 1848–49
- Siege of Temesvár (1849) – Hungarian Revolution of 1848–49
- Siege of La Serena (1851) – 1851 Chilean Revolution
- Siege of Calafat (1854) – Crimean War

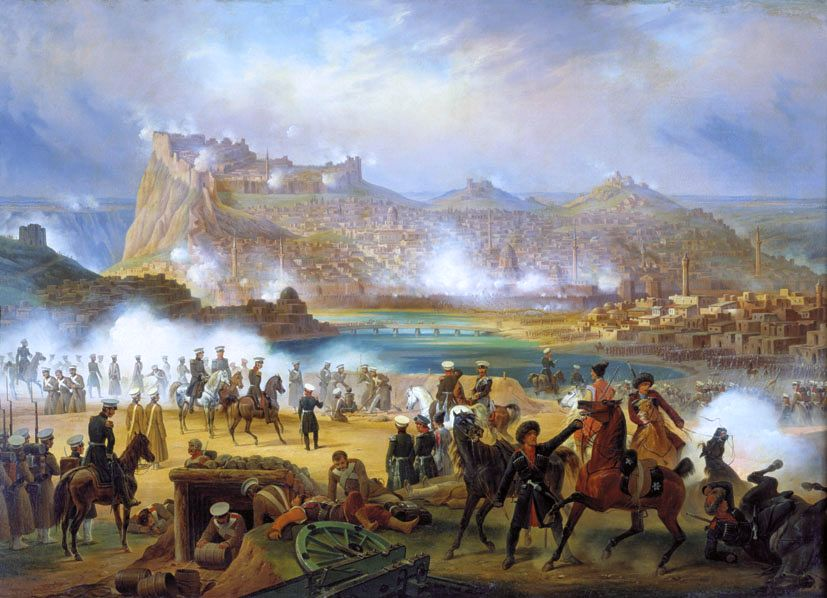
Siege of Kars, 1839

- Siege of Petropavlovsk-Kamchatsky (1854) – Crimean War
- Siege of Sevastopol (1854–55) – Crimean War
- Siege of Taganrog (1855) – Crimean War
- Siege of Kars (1855) – Crimean War
- Siege of Medina Fort (1857) – Toucouleurs besiege French for 97 days
- Siege of Delhi (1857) – Indian Rebellion of 1857
- Siege of Cawnpore (1857) – Indian Rebellion of 1857
- Siege of Lucknow (1857) – Indian Rebellion of 1857
- Siege of Arrah (1857) – Indian Rebellion of 1857
- Siege of Jhansi (1858) – Indian Rebellion of 1857
- Siege of Đà Nẵng (1858–1860)
- Siege of Tourane (1858–1860)
- Siege of Saigon (1859)
- Siege of Ancona (1860) – Italian Risorgimento
- Siege of Messina (1860–61) – Italian Risorgimento
- Siege of Civitella del Tronto (1860–61) – Italian Risorgimento
- Siege of Gaeta (1860–1861) – Italian Risorgimento
- Siege of Fort Sumter (1861) – Union soldiers in Fort Sumter surrendered after a few days of bombardment by Confederate forces starting the American Civil War.
- Siege of Tubac (1861) – Apache Wars
- Siege of New Orleans (1862) – Union Army besieged a Confederate city in the American Civil War
- Siege of Vicksburg (1863) – Union Army besieged a Confederate city in the American Civil War.
- Siege of Port Hudson (1863) – Union Army surrounded Confederate river stronghold for 48 days.
- Siege of Puebla (1863) – Second French intervention in Mexico
- Siege of Petersburg (1864–1865) – American Civil War
- Siege of Tashkent (1865) – Russo–Kokand War
- Siege of Fort Ampola (1866) – Italian Risorgimento
- Fourth siege of El Callao (1866) – naval battle between Spain and Peru (and her allies)
- Siege of Querétaro (1867) – second French intervention in Mexico
- Siege of Mexico City (1867) – second French intervention in Mexico
- Siege of Humaitá (1867–1868) – Paraguayan War
- Siege of Hakodate (1869)

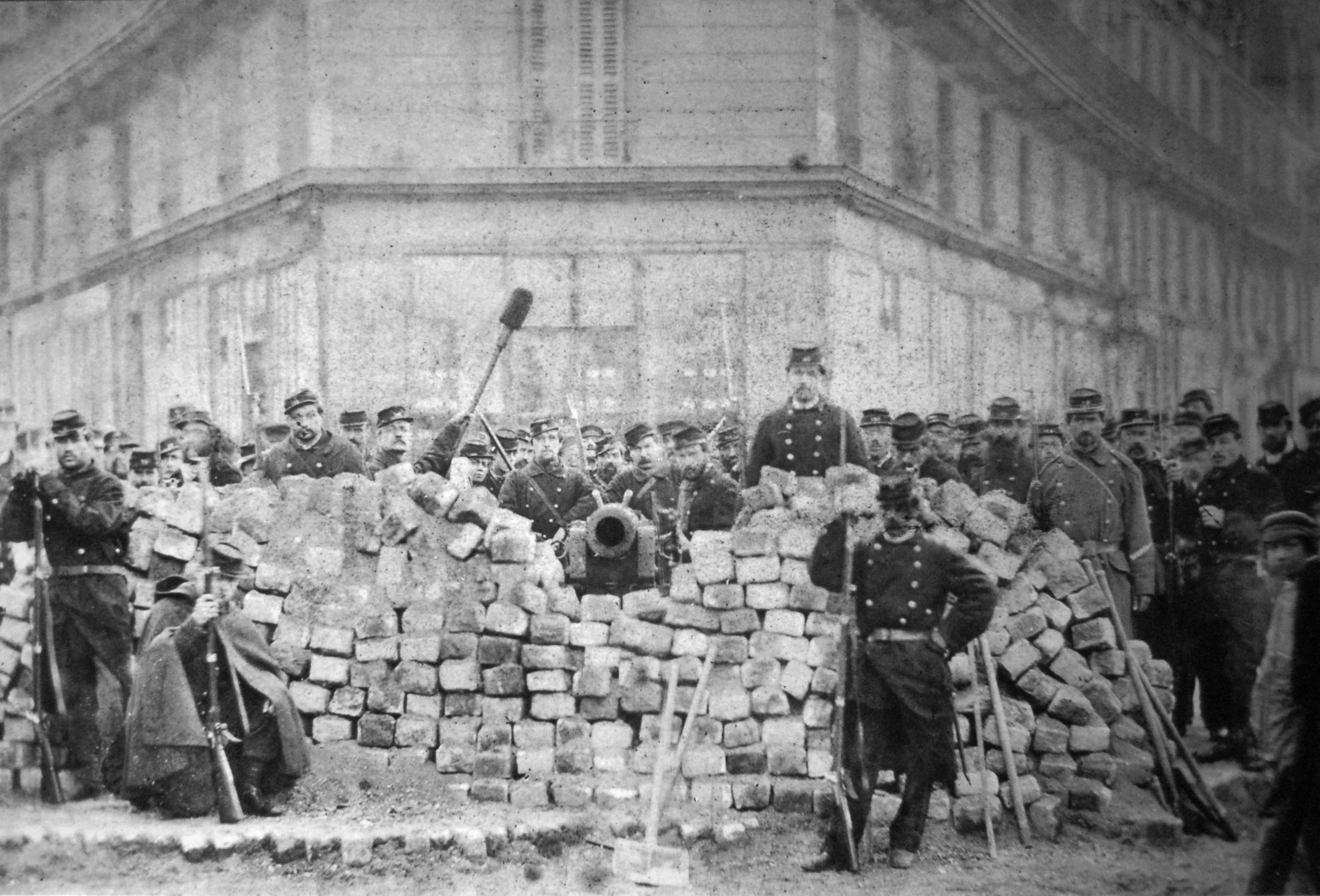
A barricade on Rue Voltaire, after its capture by the regular army during the Bloody Week of Commune of Paris (1871)

- Capture of Rome (1870) – Italian Risorgimento
- Siege of Strasbourg (1870) – Franco-Prussian War
- Siege of Toul (1870) – Franco-Prussian War
- Siege of Metz (1870) – Franco-Prussian War
- Siege of Paris and the Paris Commune (1870–71)
- Siege of Belfort (1870–71) – Franco-Prussian War
- Siege of Cartagena (1873–1874)
- Siege of Pamplona (1874) – First Spanish Republic
- Siege of Bar (1877) – Montenegrin–Ottoman War (1876–1878)
- Siege of Plevna (1877–1878) – Russo-Turkish War (1877–78)
- Siege of the Bears Paw (1877) – final engagement of the Nez Perce War.
- Siege of Eshowe (1879) – Anglo–Zulu War
- Fifth siege of El Callao (1880) – Chilean naval blockade and bombardment of El Callao (Peru), during the War of the Pacific
- Siege of Miraflores (1880) – Chilean siege of Lima (Peru), during the War of the Pacific
- Siege of Geok Tepe (1880–81) – Russian conquest of Turkestan
- Siege of Marabastad (1881) – First Boer War
- Siege of Khartoum (1884–85) – Mahdist War
- Siege of Tuyên Quang (1884–85) – Sino-French War
- Siege of Lapa (1893) – Federalist Revolution
- Siege of Mek'elè (1896) – First Italo-Ethiopian War
- Siege of Santiago (1898) – Spanish–American War
- First siege of San Juan (1898) – Spanish–American War
- Second siege of San Juan (1898) – Spanish–American War
- Siege of Manila (1898) – Spanish–American War
- Siege of Baler (1898–99) – Philippine Revolution
- Siege of Masbate (1898–99) – Philippine Revolution

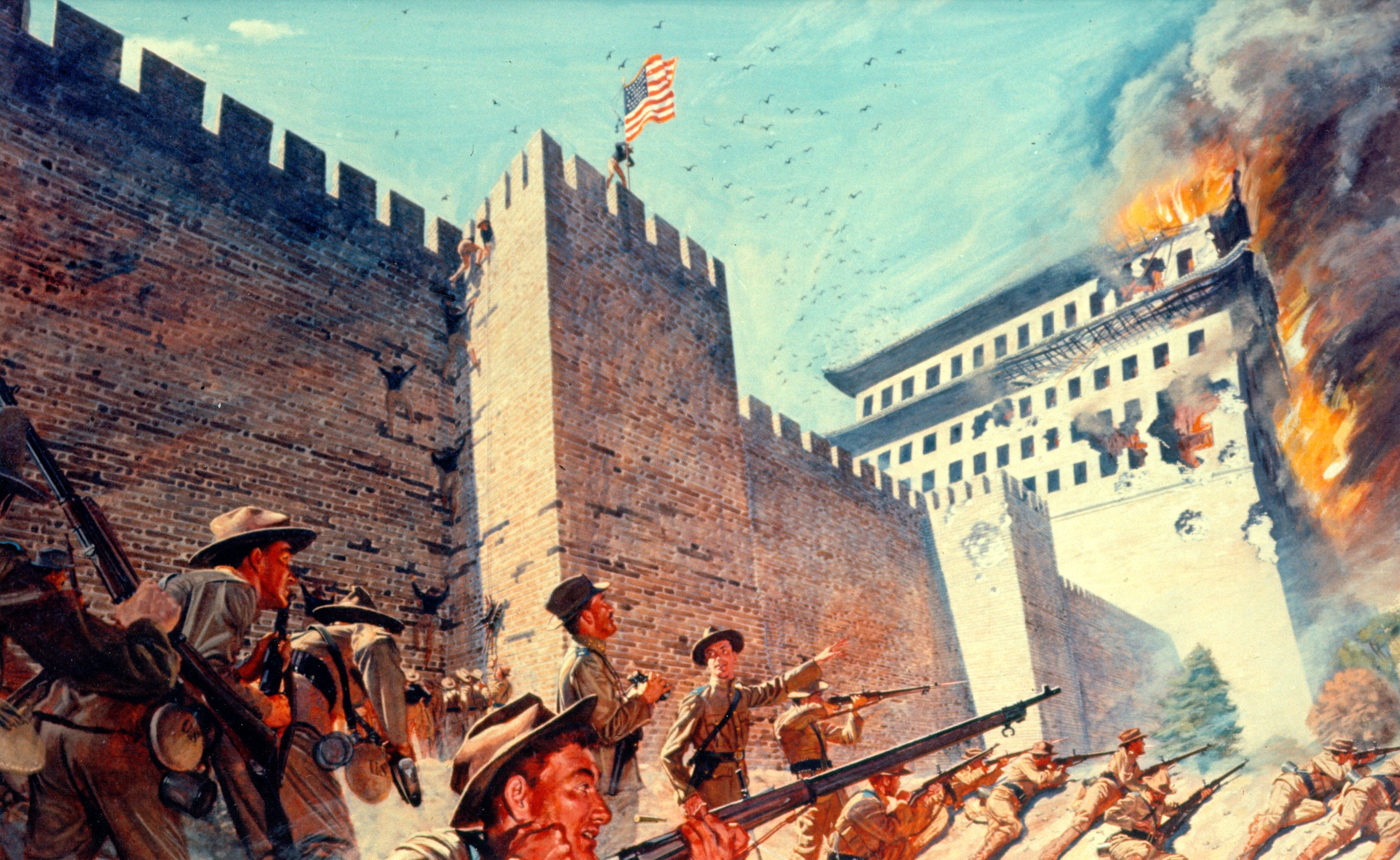
American soldiers scale the walls of Beijing to relieve the Siege of the Legations, August 1900

- Siege of Zamboanga (1898–99) – Philippine Revolution
- Siege of Apia (1899) – Second Samoan Civil War
- Siege of Bucaramanga (1899) – Thousand Days' War (Colombia)
- Siege of Mafeking (1899–1900) – Second Boer War
- Siege of Kimberley (1899–1900) – second Boer War
- Siege of Ladysmith (1899–1900) – second Boer War
- Siege of the International Legations (1900) – Boxer Rebellion
  - Siege of Beitang (1900) - – Boxer Rebellion, occurred in Beijing in parallel with the siege of International Legations

=== 20th century ===
- Siege of San Cristobal (1901) – Thousand Days' War (Venezuela)
- Siege of La Victoria (1902)- Revolución Libertadora (Venezuela)
- Siege of Puerto Cabello (1902–1903)- Naval blockade of Venezuela
- Siege of La Guaira (1902–1903)- Naval blockade of Venezuela
- Siege of Castle San Carlos (1903)- Naval blockade of Venezuela
- Siege of Ciudad Bolivar (1903)- Revolución Libertadora (Venezuela)
- Siege of Port Arthur (1904–05) Russo-Japanese War
- Siege of Scutari (1912–13) – First Balkan War
- Siege of Adrianople (1912–13) – first Balkan War

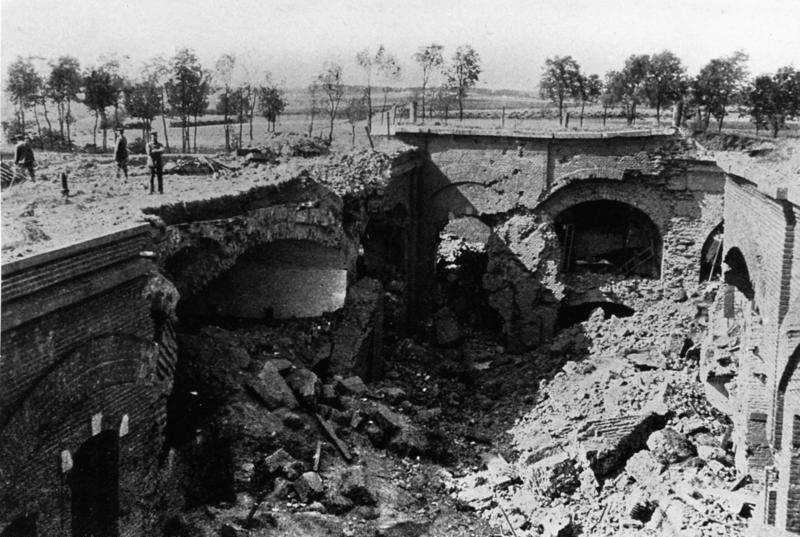
A casemate at Maubeuge, destroyed by German bombardment, 7 September 1914

- Siege of Vidin (1913) – Second Balkan War
- Siege of Veracruz (1914) – Mexican Revolution
- Battle of Liège (1914) – World War I
- Siege of Namur (1914) – World War I
- Siege of Maubeuge (1914) – World War I
- Siege of Toma (1914) – World War I
- Siege of Przemyśl (1914–15) – World War I
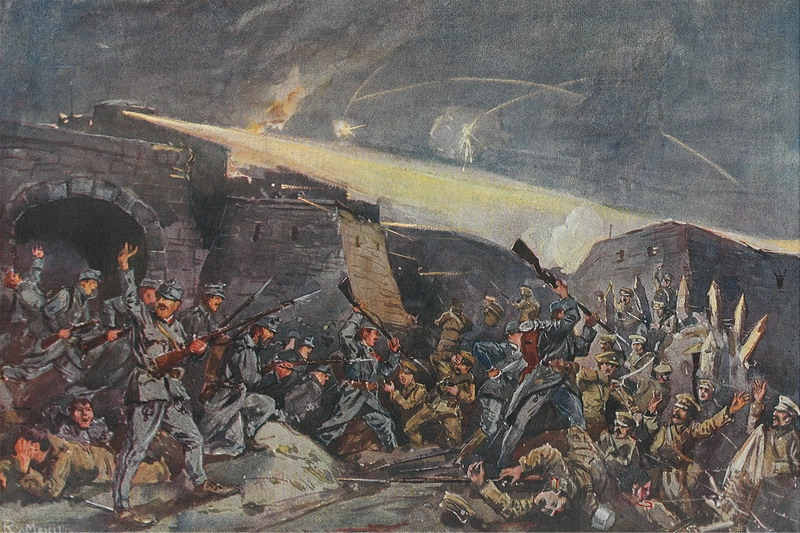
  Russian infantry storming a fort during the siege of Przemyśl
- Siege of Antwerp (1914) – World War I
- Siege of Tsingtao (1914) – World War I
- Defense of Van (1915) – World War I
- Siege of Novogeorgievsk (1915) – World War I
- Siege of Kaunas (1915) – World War I
- Siege of Kut (1915–16) – World War I
- Siege of Medina (1916–19) – World War I
- Battle of Jerusalem (1917) – World War I
- Siege of Najaf (1918) – World War I
- Siege of Aintab (1920–1921) – Franco-Turkish War
- Siege of Khiva (1920) – Russian Civil War
- Siege of Perekop (1920) – Russian Civil War
- Siege of Dushanbe (1922) – Russian Civil War
- Siege of Khiva (1922) – Russian Civil War
- Siege of Khiva (1924) – Russian Civil War
- Siege of Naco (1929) – Escobar Rebellion
- Siege of Cuartel de la Montaña (1936) – Spanish Civil War
- Siege of Cuartel de Loyola (1936) – Spanish Civil War
- Siege of Gijón (1936) – Spanish Civil War
- Siege of Oviedo (1936) – Spanish Civil War
- Siege of the Alcázar (1936) – Second Spanish Republic militias besieged the Alcázar of Toledo in the Spanish Civil War
- Siege of Santuario de Nuestra Señora de la Cabeza (1936–1937) – Spanish Civil War
- Siege of Madrid (1936–1939) – Spanish Civil War
- Defense of Sihang Warehouse (1937) Second Sino-Japanese War
- Siege of Gandesa (1938) – Spanish Civil War
- Siege of Warsaw (1939) – World War II
- Siege of Lwów (1939) – World War II
- Siege of Hegra Fortress (1940) – World War II
- Siege of Calais (1940) – World War II
- Siege of Lille (1940) – World War II
- Siege of Malta (1940–1943) – World War II

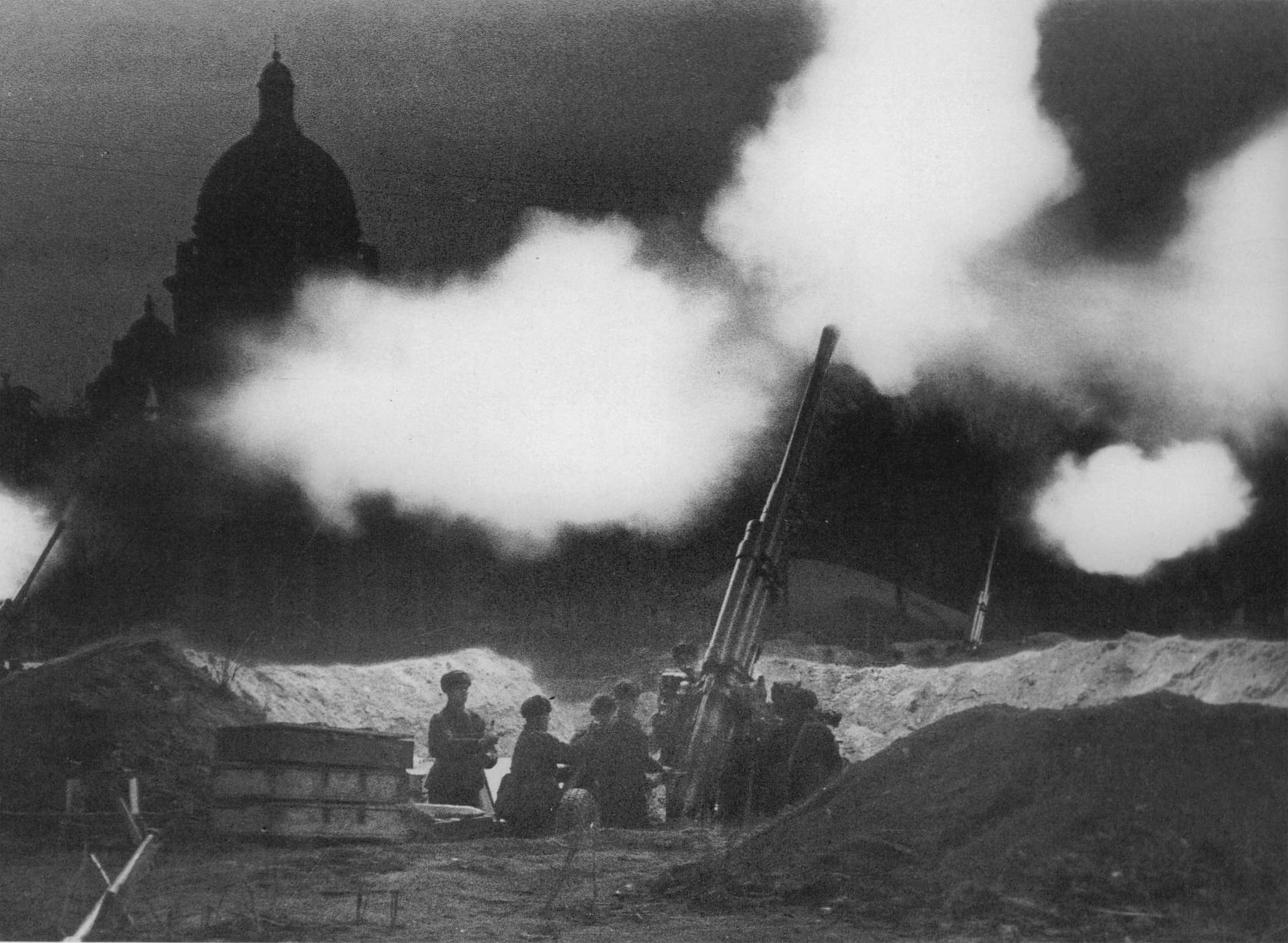
Anti-aircraft fire near St. Isaac's Cathedral during the defense of Leningrad in 1941.

- Siege of Giarabub (1940–1941) – World War II
- Siege of Saïo (1941) – World War II
- Siege of Tobruk (1941) – World War II
- Siege of Brest Fortress (1941) – World War II
- Siege of Mogilev (1941) – World War II
- Siege of Odessa (1941) – World War II
- Siege of Leningrad (1941–1944) – also known as the 900-Day Siege, probably the most gruesome in history, World War II.
- Siege of Rogatica (1941) – World War II
- Siege of Sevastopol (1941–1942) – World War II
- Siege of Yenangyaung (1942) – World War II
- Siege of Stalingrad (1942–1943) – World War II
- Siege of Turjak (1943) – World War II
- Siege of Imphal (1944) – World War II
- Siege of Kohima (1944) – World War II
- Siege of Myitkyina (1944) – World War II
- Siege of Mount Song (1944) – World War II
- Siege of Hengyang (1944) – World War II
- Siege of La Rochelle (1944–1945) – World War II
- Siege of Dunkirk (1944–1945) – World War II
- Siege of Bastogne (1944) – World War II
- Siege of Budapest (1944–1945) – World War II
- Siege of Breslau (1945) – World War II
- Siege of Danzig (1945) – World War II
- Siege of Berlin (1945) – World War II
- Siege of Hutou Fortress (1945) – Soviet-Japanese War, part of World War II
- Siege of Kunar Khas (1945) – Afghan tribal revolts of 1944–1947
- Siege of Jerusalem (1947–1948) – 1948 Arab–Israeli War – Palestinian Arabs laid siege to the Jewish quarters of Jerusalem, but were driven back. Siege was resumed in May by regular Jordanian and Egyptian forces. Ended in armistice.
- Siege of Changchun (1948) – Chinese Civil War
- Berlin Blockade (1948–49) – No military action, but the tactic to starve a city by cutting her supply lines is a feature of a siege. The famous Berlin Air Lift supplied the city with food, coal, medical supplies and other goods for nearly a year.
- Siege of Surakarta (1949) – Indonesian National Revolution
- Blockade of Wonsan (1951–53) – Korean War
- Siege of Dien Bien Phu (1954) – Vietnamese Viet Minh forces besieged French forces, effecting a final defeat on France's colonial occupation.
- Siege of Sidi Ifni (1957–58) – Ifni War
- Siege of Jadotville (1961) – Congo Crisis
- Siege of Puerto Cabello (1962) – Venezuelan political crisis
- Siege of Erenköy (1964) – Turkish Cypriots holding out against attacking Greek and Greek Cypriot forces. Turkish invasion of Cyprus
- Siege of Plei Me (1965) – Vietnam War
- Encirclement of Jerusalem (1967) – Six-Day War
- Siege of Sana'a (1967–68) – North Yemen Civil War
- Siege of Khe Sanh (1968) – Vietnam War
- Siege of Huế (1968) – Vietnam War
- Siege of Da Nang (1968) – Vietnam War
- Siege of Owerri (1968) – Nigerian Civil War
- Siege of Jolo (1974) – Moro conflict
- Siege of Saigon (1975) – Vietnam War
- Siege of Tel al-Zaatar (1976) – Lebanese Civil War
- Siege of Nakfa (1976–1977) – Eritrean War of Independence
- Grand Mosque seizure (1979)
- Siege of Khost (1980–91) – Soviet–Afghan War
- Siege of Aleppo (1980) – Islamist uprising in Syria
- Siege of Abadan (1980–81) – Iran–Iraq War
- Siege of Zahleh (1980–81) – Lebanese Civil War
- Siege of Hama (1982) better known as Hama massacre, Islamist uprising in Syria.
- Siege of Beirut (1982) – 1982 Lebanon War
- Siege of Urgun (1983–84) – Soviet–Afghan War
- Badaber uprising (1985) – Soviet–Afghan War
- War of the Camps (1985–88) – Lebanese Civil War
- Siege of Masaka (1985) – Ugandan Bush War
- Siege of Basra (1987) – Iran–Iraq War
- Siege of Jeffna (1987) – Sri Lankan Civil War
- Battle of Kokavil (1990) – Sri Lankan Civil War
- First Battle of Elephant Pass (1991) – Sri Lankan Civil War
- Battle of the Barracks (1991) – Croatian War of Independence
  - Siege of Varaždin Barracks
  - Siege of Bjelovar Barracks
- Siege of Kijevo (1991) – Croatian War of Independence
- Siege of Slunj (1991) – Croatian War of Independence
- Siege of Vukovar (1991) – Croatian War of Independence
- Siege of Dubrovnik (1991–92) – Croatian War of Independence
- Siege of Stepanakert (1991–92) – First Nagorno-Karabakh War

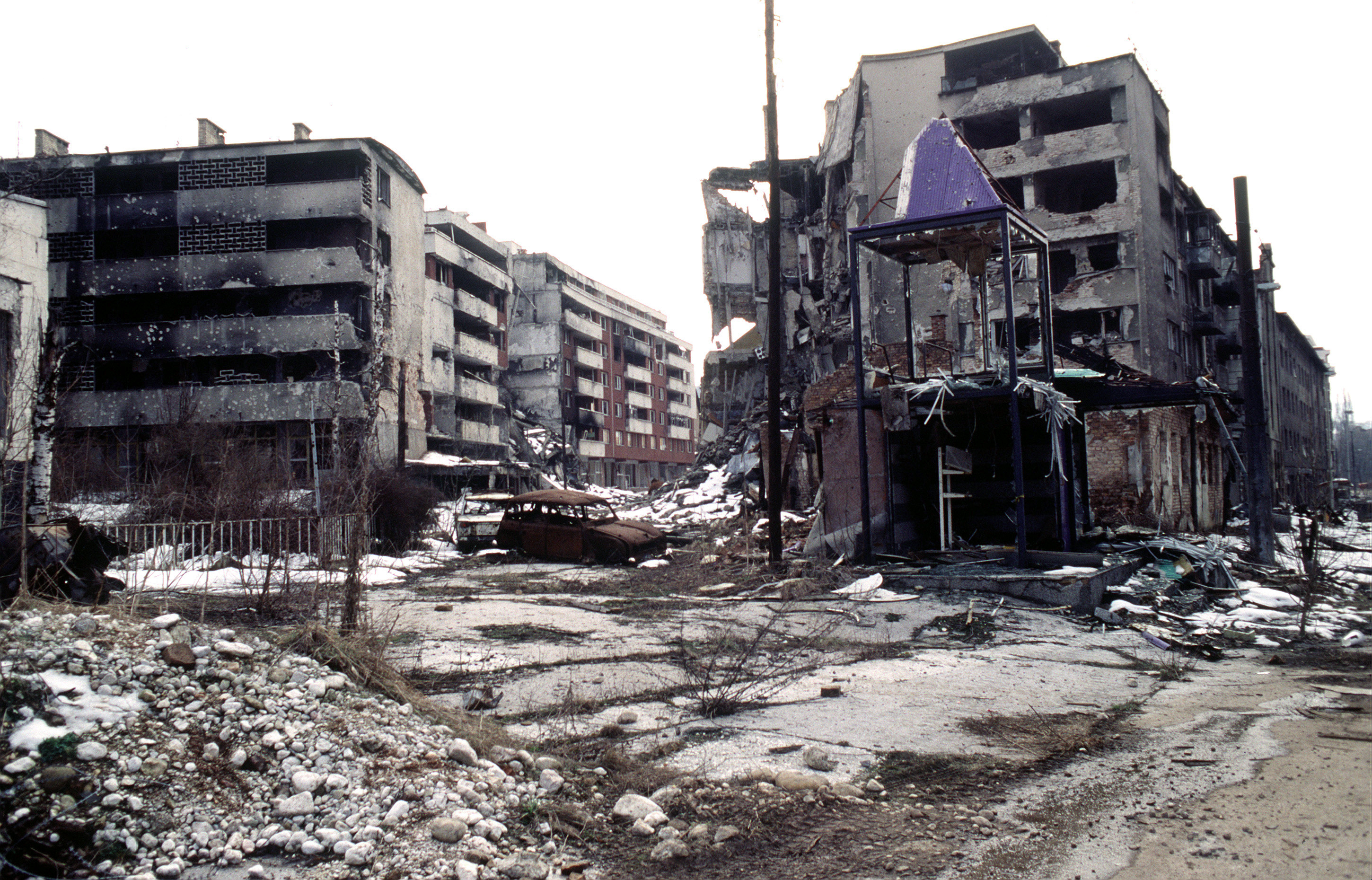
Damaged buildings following the siege of Sarajevo, 1996

- Siege of Sarajevo (1992–96) – Bosnian War
- Siege of Mostar (1992–93,1993–94) – Bosnian War
- Siege of Doboj (1992) – Bosnian War
- Siege of Žepa (1992–95) – Bosnian War
- Siege of Bihać (1992–95) – Bosnian War
- Siege of Tkvarcheli (1992–93) – War in Abkhazia (1992–93)
- Siege of Kotor Varoš (1992) – Bosnian War
- Siege of Smoluća (1992) – Bosnian War
- Siege of Goražde (1992–95) – Bosnian War
- Siege of Srebrenica (1993–1995) – Bosnian War
- Battle of Grozny (1994–1995) – First Chechen War
- Battle of Jaffna (1995) – Sri Lankan Civil War
- Siege of Freetown (1997-1998) – Sierra Leone Civil War
- Siege of Junik (1998) – Kosovo War
- Siege of Mitú (1998) – Colombian conflict
- Battle of Grozny (1999–2000) – Second Chechen War

=== 21st century ===
- Siege of Kunduz (2001) – War in Afghanistan (2001–2021)
- Siege of the Church of the Nativity in Bethlehem (2002) – Second Intifada
- Siege of Monrovia (2003) – Second Liberian Civil War
- Siege of Sadr City (2004–2008) – Iraq War
- Siege of Sangin (2006–2007) – War in Afghanistan (2001–2021)
- Siege of Musa Qala (2006) – War in Afghanistan (2001–2021)
- Siege of Bint Jbeil (2006) – Second Lebanon War
- Siege of Al Amarah (2006) – Iraq War
- Siege of UK bases in Basra (2007) – Iraq War
- Siege of Nahr el-Bared (2007) – 2007 Lebanon Conflict
- Blockade of the Gaza Strip (2007–present) – Gaza–Israel conflict
- Siege of Lal Masjid (2007) – War in North-West Pakistan
- Siege of Baidoa (2008) – Somali Civil War
- Siege of Misrata (2011) – First Libyan Civil War
- First Battle of Zawiya (2011) – first Libyan Civil War
- Siege of Daraa (2011) – Syrian Civil War
- Siege of Homs (2011–2014) – Syrian Civil War
- Siege of Baniyas (2011) – Syrian Civil War
- Siege of Talkalakh (2011) – Syrian Civil War
- Siege of Rastan and Talbiseh (2011) – Syrian Civil War
- Siege of Hama (2011) – Syrian Civil War
- Siege of Latakia (2011) – Syrian Civil War
- Battle of Sirte (2011) – first Libyan Civil War
- Siege of Dammaj (2011–12, 2013–14) – Yemeni Revolution / Houthi insurgency in Yemen
- Siege of Northern Homs (2012–2018) – Syrian Civil War
- Siege of Aleppo (2012–2016) – Syrian Civil War
- Siege of Nubl and Al-Zahraa (2012–2016) – Syrian Civil War
- Siege of Menagh Air Base (2012–2013) – Syrian Civil War
- Siege of Bani Walid (2012) – Factional violence in Libya (2011–14)

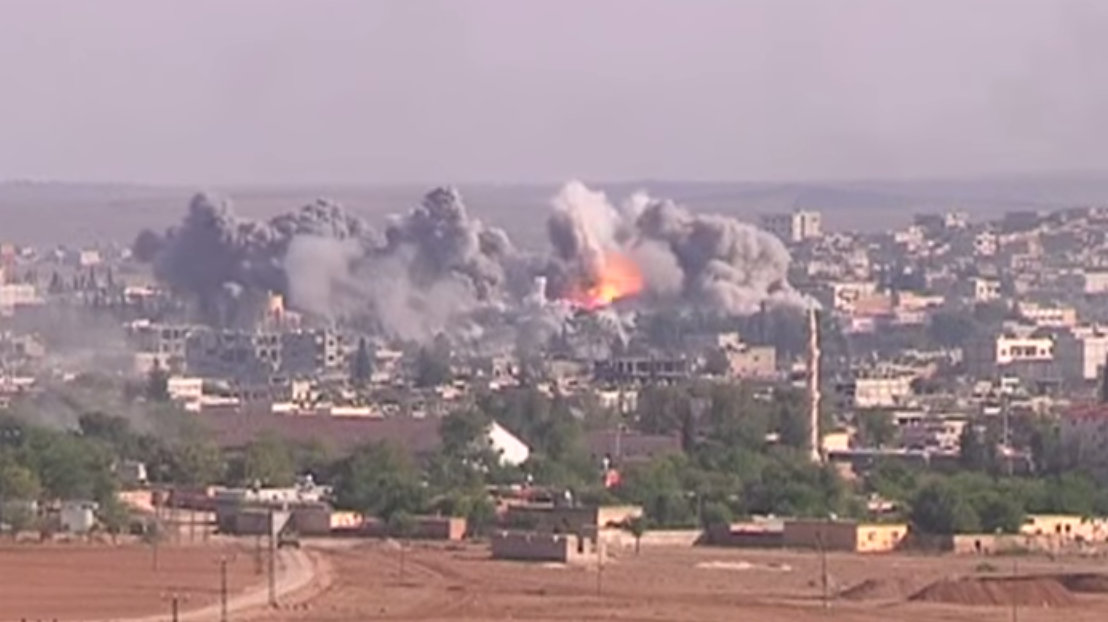
Coalition airstrike targeting Islamic State positions during the Siege of Kobanî, October 2014

- Siege of Base 46 (2012) – Syrian Civil War
- First siege of Wadi Deif (2012–2013) – Syrian Civil War
- Siege of Darayya and Muadamiyat (2012-2016) – Syrian Civil War
- Zamboanga City crisis (2013) – Moro conflict
- Siege of Eastern Ghouta (2013–2018) – Syrian Civil War
- Siege of PK5 district (2013-2020) – Central African Republic Civil War (2012-present)
- Siege of Wadi Barada (2013–2017) – Syrian Civil War
- Second siege of Wadi Deif (2014) – Syrian Civil War
- Siege of Sloviansk (2014) – Russo-Ukrainian War (War in Donbass)
- Siege of the Luhansk Border Base (2014) – Russo-Ukrainian War (War in Donbass)
- Siege of Amirli (2014) – Iraqi Civil War
- Siege of Deir ez-Zor (2014–2017) – Syrian Civil War
- Battle of Ilovaisk (2014) – Russo-Ukrainian War (War in Donbass)
- Siege of Saqlawiyah (2014) – Iraqi Civil War
- Siege of Kobanî (2014–2015) – Syrian Civil War
- Siege of Al-Fu'ah and Kafriya (2015–2018) – Syrian Civil War
- Siege of Taiz (2015–present)– Yemeni Civil War
- Cizre operation (2015) – Kurdish–Turkish conflict (2015–present)
- Siege of Silvan (2015) – Kurdish–Turkish conflict (2015–present)
- Siege of Sur (2015–2016) – Kurdish–Turkish conflict (2015–present)
- Siege of Cizre (2015–2016) Kurdish–Turkish conflict (2015–present)
- Siege of Fallujah (2016) – Iraqi Civil War

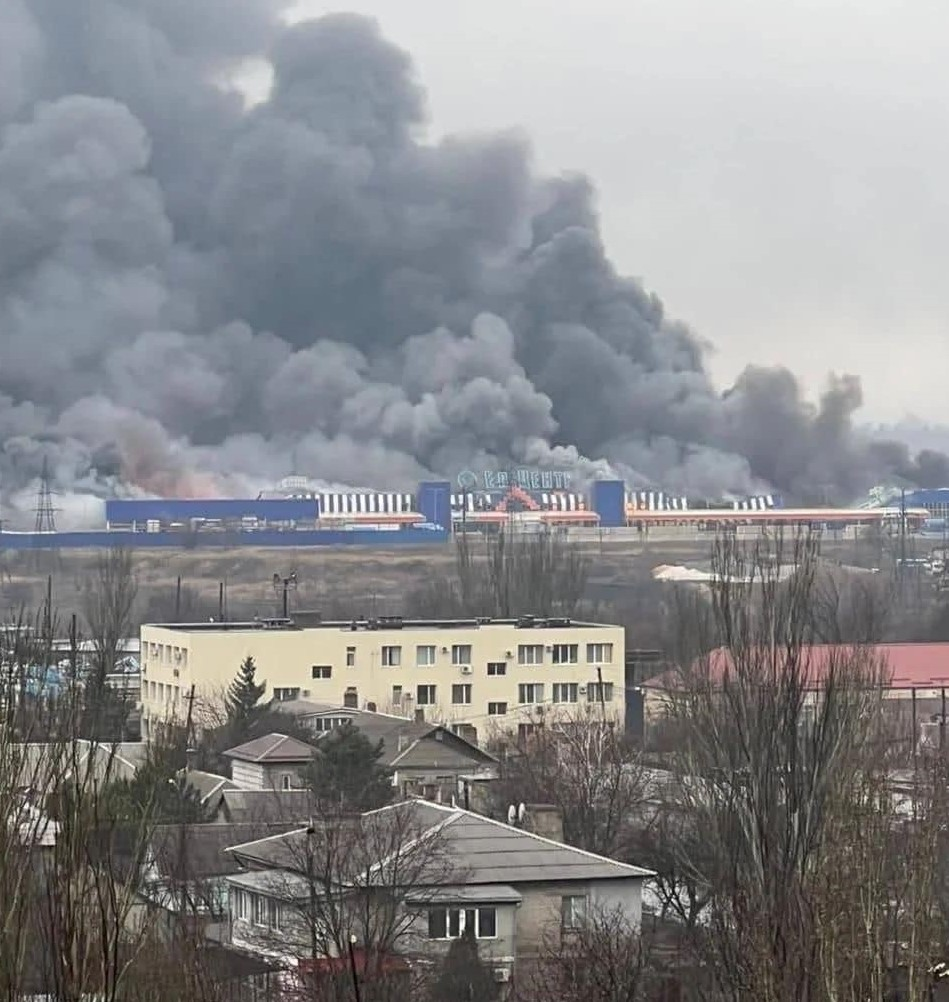
Burning buildings during the Siege of Mariupol, 2022

- Siege of Sirte (2016) – Second Libyan Civil War
- Siege of Derna (2016–2018) – second Libyan Civil War
- Siege of Mosul (2016–2017) – Iraqi Civil War
- Siege of Tabqa (2017) – Syrian Civil War
- Siege of Marawi (2017) – Moro conflict
- Siege of Sidi Akribesh (2017) – second Libyan Civil War
- Siege of Al Hudaydah (2018) — Yemeni Civil War
- Siege of Baghuz Fawqani (2019) – Syrian Civil War
- Siege of the Jabara Valley (2019) – Yemeni Civil War
- Siege of Ras al-Ayn (2019) – Syrian Civil War
- Siege of Farabougou (2020) – Mali War
- Siege of Qamishli and Al-Hasakah (2021) – Syrian Civil War
- Siege of Madjoari (2021) – Jihadist insurgency in Burkina Faso
- Battle of Palma (2021) – Insurgency in Cabo Delgado
- Siege of Panjshir (2021) – Republican insurgency in Afghanistan
- Siege of Tigray (2021-2023) – Tigray War
- Al Sina’a prison siege (2022) – Syrian Civil War
- Siege of Djibo (2022–present) – Jihadist insurgency in Burkina Faso
- Siege of Chernihiv (2022) – Russo-Ukrainian War (Russian invasion of Ukraine)
- Siege of Mariupol (2022) – Russo-Ukrainian War (Russian invasion of Ukraine)
- Siege of Moura (2022) – better known as Moura massacre, Mali War
- Siege of Kawkareik (2022) – Myanmar civil war (2021–present)
- Siege of Ti Bwar (2022) – Myanmar civil war (2021–present)
- Blockade of the Republic of Artsakh (2022–2023) – aftermath of the Second Nagorno-Karabakh War
- Siege of Paraskoviivka (2023) – Russo-Ukrainian War (2022–present)
- Siege of El Obeid (2023) – Sudanese civil war (2023–present)
- Siege of Zalingei (2023) – Sudanese civil war (2023–present)
- Siege of El Geneina (2023) – Sudanese civil war (2023–present)
- Siege of Diling (2023-2024) – Sudanese civil war (2023–present)
- Siege of Timbuktu (2023–present) – Mali War
- Siege of the 16th Infantry Division base (2023) – Sudanese civil war (2023–present)

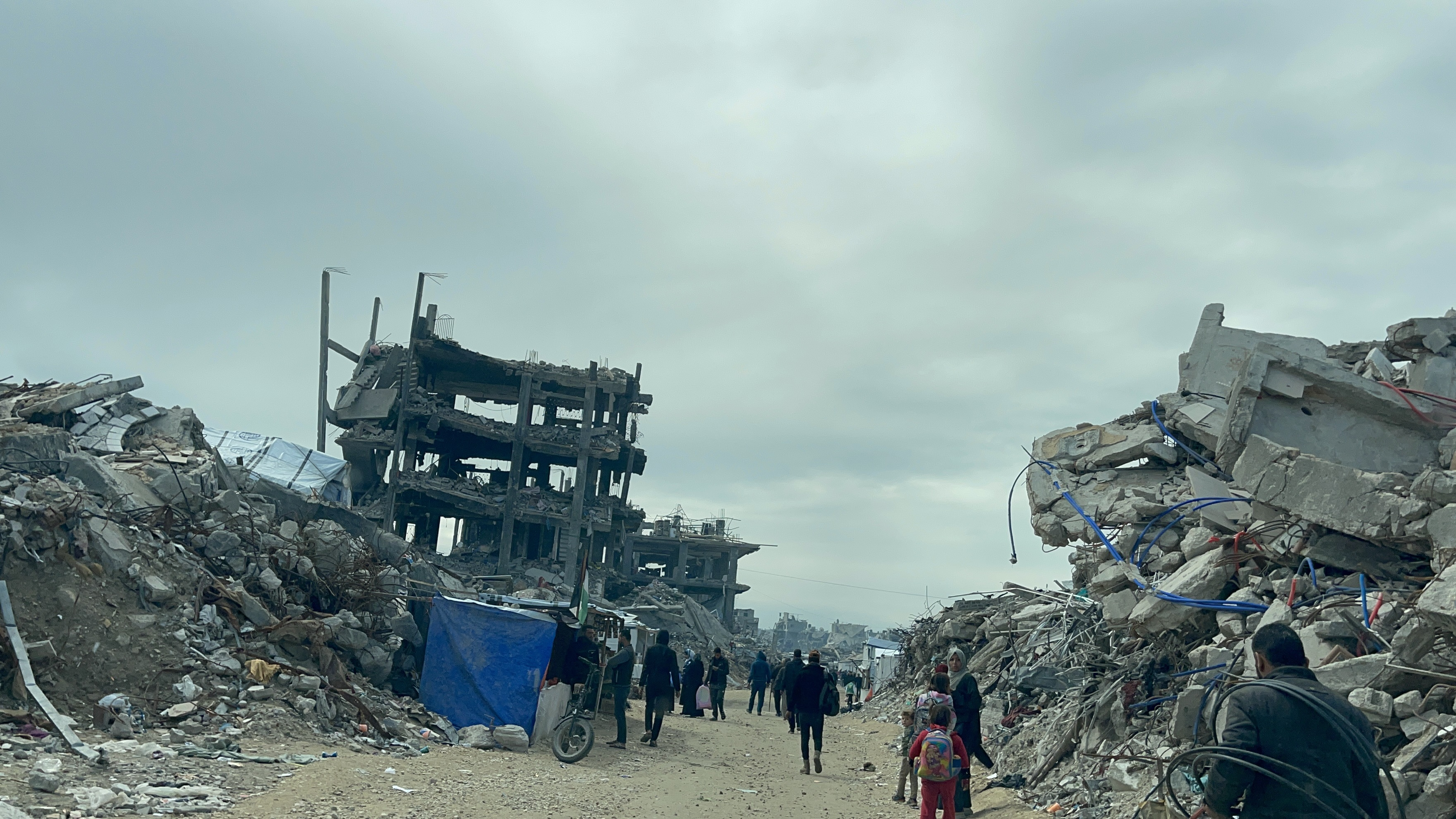
Civilians and ruins following the Siege of Gaza City, 2025

- Siege of Gaza City (2023) – Gaza war
  - Al-Shifa Hospital sieges (2023, 2024)
- Siege of Al-Qarara (2023) – Gaza war
- Kamal Adwan Hospital sieges (2023, 2024)- Gaza war
- Siege of Babanusa (2024-2025) – Sudanese civil war (2023–present)
- Siege of Khan Yunis (2024) – Gaza war (battle since 2023, siege completed in 2024)
  - Nasser Hospital siege (2024)
- Siege of Hpasawng (2024–present)– Myanmar civil war (2021–present)
- Siege of Myawaddy (2024) – Myanmar civil war (2021–present)
- Siege of El Fasher (2024-2025) – Sudanese civil war (2023–present) (battle since 2023, siege completed in 2024)
- Siege of Al-Fulah (2024) – Sudanese civil war (2023–present)
- Siege of Lashio (2024) – Myanmar civil war (2021–present)
- Siege of North Gaza (2024) – Gaza war
- Siege of Ann (2024) – Myanmar civil war (2021–present)
- Siege of Falam (2024-2025) – Myanmar civil war (2021–present)
- Siege of Beit Hanoun (2025) – Gaza war
- Siege of Myrnohrad (2025-2026) – Russo-Ukrainian War (2022–present)

== Police sieges ==
A police siege is a standoff between law enforcement officers and armed criminals, suspects, or protesters.

- Siege of Sidney Street (1911) England
- Attica Siege (1971) United States of America
- Munich Olympic massacre (1972) Germany
- Wounded Knee Incident (1973) United States of America
- Norrmalmstorg robbery (1973) Sweden
- Huntsville Prison (1974) United States of America
- Spaghetti House siege (1975) England
- Balcombe Street Siege (1975) England
- Hanafi Siege (1977) United States of America
- MOVE Siege (1978) United States of America
- Iranian Embassy Siege (1980) England
- Siege of the Libyan Embassy in London (1984) United Kingdom
- Palace of Justice siege (1985) Colombia
- Oka Crisis (1990) Quebec, Canada
- Ruby Ridge Siege (1992) United States of America
- Waco Siege (1993) United States of America
- Chiapas conflict (1994–late 2010s) Chiapas, Mexico
- Gustafsen Lake Standoff (1995) British Columbia, Canada
- Montana Freemen Siege (1996) United States of America
- Japanese embassy hostage crisis (1996–1997) Peru
- Republic of Texas Davis Mountain Resort siege (1997) United States of America
- Sauk Siege (2000) Malaysia
- Moscow theater hostage crisis (2002) Russia
- Beslan hostage crisis (2004) Russia
- January 2005 Dagestan sieges (2005) Russia
- Manila Peninsula siege (2007) Philippines
- Napier shootings (2009) New Zealand
- Siege of Complexo do Alemão's slums, major urban conflict in Rio de Janeiro (2010) Brazil
- Hectorville siege (2011) Australia
- Wukan protests (2011) China
- Siege of Eker (2012) Bahrain
- Sydney hostage crisis (2014) Australia
- Hypercacher kosher supermarket siege (2015) France
- 2016 Yerevan hostage crisis (2016) Armenia
- Kidapawan jail siege (2017) Philippines
- Brighton siege (2017) Australia
- Siege of the Chinese University of Hong Kong (2019)
- Siege of the Hong Kong Polytechnic University (2019)
- 2022 Iraq parliament siege (2022) Iraq
- Siege of the Villa Rossa Hotel (2022) Somalia
- Blockade of Soyapango (2022) El Salvador
- Bannu counterterrorism centre siege (2022) Pakistan
- 2023 Karachi police station siege (2023) Pakistan
- Blockade of Nueva Concepción (2023) El Salvador
- Blockade of the Cabañas Department (2023) El Salvador
- 2024 Mogadishu SYL Hotel attack and siege (2024) Somalia
- Blockade of southern Chalatenango (2024) El Salvador

== Other ==
- Gwangju uprising (1980) South Korea
- Storming of the Legislative Council Complex (2019) Hong Kong
