= Siege of Dijon =

1513 campaign during the War of the League of Cambrai

- Part of the War of the League of Cambrai
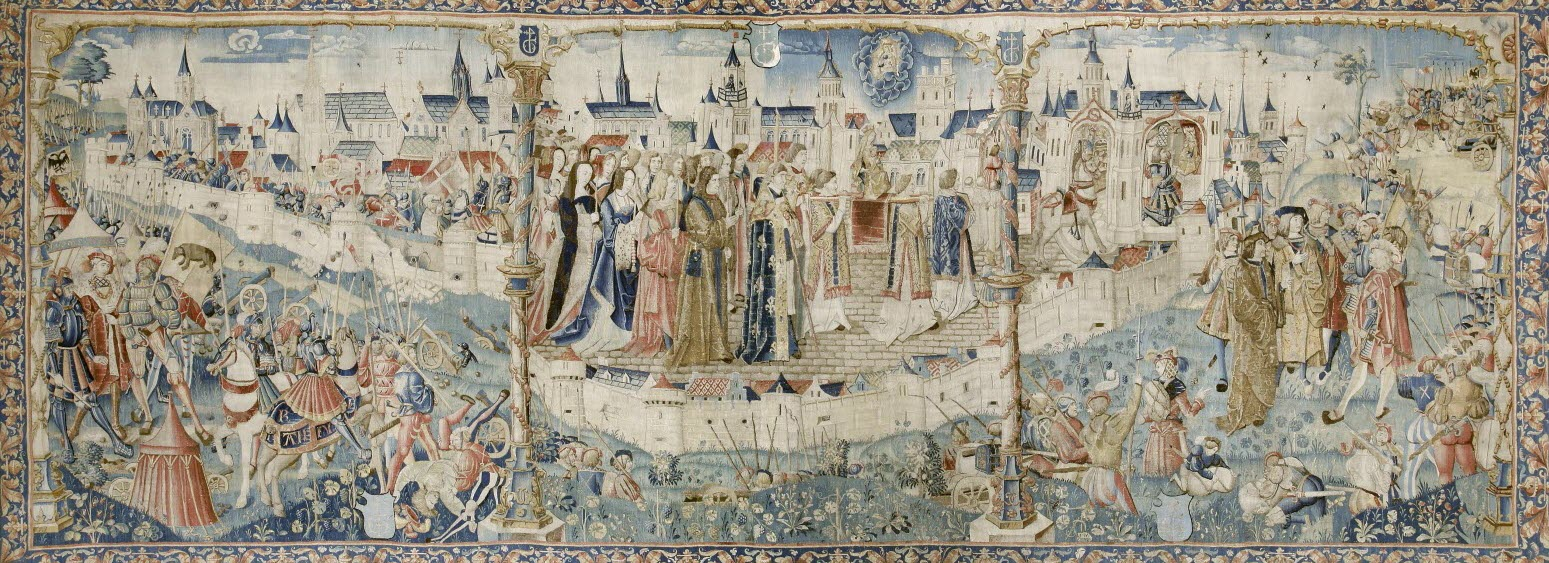
- Siege of Dijon, Flemish tapestry
Date	8–13 September 1513
Location	Dijon, Kingdom of France 47°19′00″N 5°01′00″E
Result	Treaty of Dijon (fr), Swiss victory: France pays 400,000 gold crowns; The Swiss abandone the siege
Territorial changes	The Swiss receive the Duchy of Milan; France returns all occupied territory of the Papal States

Belligerents
Kingdom of France	Old Swiss Confederacy; Holy Roman Empire; Franche-Comté

Commanders and leaders
Louis II de la Trémoille	(Holy Roman Empire) Ulrich of Württemberg; Henri Winckler; Jacques de Watteville; Jean Marti; Guillaume IV de Vergy

Strength
4-5,000 men	40,000 men 500 cannons

The Siege of Dijon between 8 and 13 September 1513 was a successful campaign of the Swiss army against the French city of Dijon during the War of the League of Cambrai.

== Prelude ==
After the French defeats at Novara (6 June) and Guinegatte (16 August), Louis XII anticipated a counter-attack by the Imperial armies on France's own soil. Louis II de la Trémoille was recalled from Italy and appointed Governor of Dijon. He began preparing the defense of the city as early as July, by accumulating substantial food and military reserves. La Trémoille also ordered the city's suburbs to be burned, as these areas could have sheltered the enemy advance right up to the city walls.

Meanwhile, the Old Swiss Confederacy raised approximately 30,000 men for the regular militia, in the pay of the Holy Roman Emperor Maximilian I. The Confederate army was reviewed on 17 August and departed that same evening.

The Holy Roman Empire itself mobilized 1,000 German cavalry, 4,000 men-at-arms from Hainaut, and 500 artillery pieces, who joined the Swiss troops at Besançon on 27 August. Two thousand soldiers from the Franche-Comté, led by Guillaume IV de Vergy, also joined the army. The Imperial army was led by Ulrich, Duke of Württemberg, and the Swiss army by Henry Winckler, Captain of Zurich, Jakob von Wattenwyl/Jacques de Watteville, Captain of Bern, and Jean Marti, Captain of Lucerne.

The first disagreements arose when the Imperial forces wanted to march directly on Paris, while the Swiss wanted to pass through Burgundy to collect outstanding debts. The Swiss Confederation prevailed, and the army marched on Dijon in two columns.

The first column ,comprising the Germans and contingents from Zurich and Bern, successively captured Saint-Seine, Fontaine-Française, Lux, Til-Châtel, Marey-sur-Tille, Chenôve, Marsannay-la-Côte and Couchey. The second column sacked Mirebeau-sur-Bèze and Bèze Abbey.

In his correspondence with his relatives and with the King, La Trémoille testified to the desperate efforts he made to defend both the city of Dijon and the whole of his province, but almost all fortifications, poorly maintained, proved indefensible.

== The Siege ==
On 8 September, the Swiss and Imperial armies arrived at the walls of Dijon and encircled the city. On 9 September, bombardments began in an attempt to breach the walls and launch an assault. Faced with this threat, La Trémoille ordered ditches to be dug behind the most vulnerable sections of the walls.

On 10 September, after the initial bombardments proved fruitless, the Swiss decided to deploy a second battery in the hope of breaching two walls simultaneously. During these preparations, La Trémoille sent negotiators who returned empty-handed. After several hours of bombardment, two breaches appeared, but the city's defenders managed to hold off the attackers.

On 11 September, the besiegers continued to widen the breaches, while the Imperial army began to experience the first signs of supply difficulties. The Swiss also, awaiting payment promised by the Emperor on 1 September, began to lose heart for a siege that was lasting longer than expected. La Trémoille decided to drive a wedge between the two allies and promised the Confederates he would intercede for them to obtain their outstanding payments. Despite pressure from the Imperial forces and the troops from the Franche-Comté, the Swiss were receptive to this promise and agreed to a truce.

On 12 September, in the rain and mud, the Germans and the troops from the Franche-Comté launched an assault, but were too few in number to breach Dijon's defenses behind their ditches. That same day, the French and Swiss signed the Treaty of Dijon, thus bringing the siege to an end. The next day, the Confederates withdrew to Switzerland and the Imperials had no other choice but to break up their camp as well.

== Aftermath ==
In the peace-treaty all the demands of the Swiss were met: the return to the Pope of the lands previously seized by the King of France. The Swiss regained the Duchy of Milan and the County of Asti, and the sum to be paid for the preservation of Burgundy was set at 400,000 écus, half payable on 27 September and the rest on 11 November. The Swiss demanded an immediate advance payment, which La Trémoille obtained from the city of Dijon, in the amount of 25,000 écus.

After the signing of the treaty, the Swiss withdrew, taking five hostages with them. They were followed by the reluctant Germans and the Franche-Comté troops.

King Louis XII of France was informed of the treaty's contents on 14 September and rejected it, arguing that La Trémoille lacked the authority to accept territorial concessions. He also refused to pay the 400,000 écus. The hostages were released on 3 October 1514, only after the payment of a ransom of 13,900 écus by their families.

La Trémoille's skillful maneuvering had prevented the invasion of Burgundy by the Holy Roman Empire and its allies. However, broken promises led to the failure, two years later, of Francis I, Louis XII's successor, to negotiate an agreement with Switzerland, which retained access to the Duchy of Milan.
