= Jean Esmonin =

French politician (1937–2025)

Deputy of the French National Assembly for Côte d'Or's 1st constituency
- In office 25 April 1983 – 1 April 1986
- Preceded by: Roland Carraz
- Succeeded by: Robert Poujade (1988)

Mayor of Chenôve
- In office 9 December 1999 – 21 September 2015
- Preceded by: Roland Carraz
- Succeeded by: Thierry Falconnet

Member of the General Council of Côte d'Or for the Canton of Chenôve
- In office 1976–2015
- Preceded by: Maurice Mazué
- Succeeded by: Dominique Michel

Personal details
- Born: 27 February 1937 Dijon, France
- Died: 12 November 2025 (aged 88)
- Political party: PS

Jean Esmonin (French: [ʒɑ̃ ɛsmonɛ̃]; 27 February 1937 – 12 November 2025) was a French politician of the Socialist Party (PS).

Esmonin served the Canton of Chenôve in the General Council of Côte d'Or from 1976 to 2015 and was mayor of Chenôve from 1999 to 2015. He also served as a deputy in the National Assembly from 1983 to 1986.

Esmonin died on 12 November 2025, at the age of 88.
