= Siege of Beitang =

1900 event of the Boxer Rebellion

- Part of Boxer Rebellion
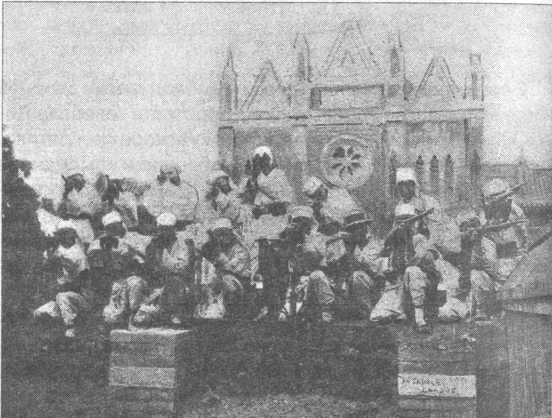
- The French and Italian defense at Beitang
Date	14 June – 16 August 1900
Location	Church of the Saviour, Beijing
Result	Franco–Italian victory

Belligerents
France; Italy (Qing dynasty) Chinese Christian refugees	China; Boxer movement

Commanders and leaders
Alphonse Favier; Paul Henry †; Angelo Olivieri	Unknown

Strength
29 marines 12 marines 2,000–4,000 men	<10,000

Casualties and losses
5 French marines, 6 Italian marines and 300 Chinese Christians	Heavy

The Siege of Beitang was a siege carried out by the Boxer movement during the Boxer Rebellion against the Catholic mission of Beitang, defended by a force of 41 Italian-French sailors and 2,000 to 4,000 Chinese Christian refugees.

== Background ==
The Boxer Rebellion had already begun with the outbreak of the battle between Qing and Boxer forces at the Battle of Senluo Temple with the Manchu princes later using the Boxers as political allies to lessen the European influence that was already present in China. During the Rebellion, the Church of the Savior in Beijing was under siege by about 10,000 Boxers from 14 June to 16 August 1900. The defense of the Church was directed by Apostolic Vicar of the Archdiocese of Beijing and designer of the cathedral Pierre-Marie-Alphonse Favier. The barricades during the Siege of the International Legations had only covered the international legations themselves as the Eight-Nation Alliance had decided to leave the Chinese Christian and European neighborhoods of Beijing to fend for themselves. Prior to the siege itself, Favier had already noticed the anti-foreign and anti-Christian sentiment amongst the population and had warned the Chinese Christian population to seek refuge in the Church as he had requested for reinforcements from the French delegation. Instead, French officials only confirmed the paltry count of only 28 marines at his disposal to defend the Church under ensign Paul Henry. His requests from the other seven members of the alliance as well as other independent European powers for reinforcements were all ignored besides the Italian delegation as despite also being besieged during the siege, had agreed to send 11 marines under the command of Corvette captain Angelo Olivieri with Olivieri and his men arriving by 5 June and being met with warm reception from Favier and the rest of the refugees.

The small number of men as well as the general isolation of the Church from the rest of the international delegations posed a significant challenge to the defenders as well as having to take in thousands of refugees who were denied entry to delegations with strict rationing having to be implemented. With the direction of defense was entrusted to Favier and the cathedral was barricaded with the help of the military, civilians and the friars and nuns themselves with women, children and the elderly also assisting in the defense. The men were armed with swords, halberds, sticks, daggers as well as some revolvers in the case of a break-in with Favier himself giving five Chinese Christians Winchester repeating rifles due to him recognizing them as being skilled hunters.

== The Siege ==
On 15 June, at 17:00, the first Boxers showed up and simply asked to enter, threatening and insulting the besieged. Two hours later, they took their anger out on the nearby mission of Shalal which had received no military protection and was set on fire shortly after. The following day, the Boxers attempted another siege and with the door unknowingly left open, around 300 Boxers armed with sabres, cutlasses, halberds and windtorches attempted to make their way in but were met by rifle fire by the French soldiers upon reaching 50 meters in their range and following the death of around 40 men, the Boxers temporarily retreated. The next few days saw continuous sieging by the Boxer rebels but were always met with heavy losses with only a few wounds on the French and Italian soldiers. 24 June made matters worse as following the capture of nearby walls overlooking the cathedral and with assistance by the Krupp cannons of the Imperial Chinese Army, the Boxers began besieging the Cathedral which put the European defense in crisis. Olivieri and his men proceeded to run on the embarkment that faced the wall in order to take down the Chinese forces and after around 30 minutes of fighting, the Chinese were forced to retreat as the Italian and French forces celebrated this victory as they held their ground after around 700 Boxers approached them from a different direction. The siege became particularly harsh when food rationing became extreme as inside the church as despite initially high rations, the defenders suffered from hunger and the little humanitarian aid was served by the nuns as well as ammunition beginning to run low. On 11 July, stones and bricks were thrown from the upper walls, injuring several and killing a refugee. A mine was also detonated around the same day but due to it being poorly armed, it did minimal damage. On 30 July, the command of the French marines was entrusted to Olivieri following the death of two marines including Henry himself.

On a rainy 4 August, the first sights of the international relief forces were seen with morale running high upon the sounds of cannon fire in the southeast. However, complications would delay the relief force as the Boxer rebels had grown to a force of 10,000 men and the siege of the Cathedral only increased in its intensity. On 10 August, a Chinese mine exploded under the cathedral and killed 4 Italian sailors on the spot and four others were buried alive by the rubble. Among those stuck in the rubble was Olivieri who managed to be freed alive together with the gunner Rosselli with the other two remaining under the rubble as search was suspended due a hail of Chinese bullets preventing further investigation. On the morning of 16 August, the siege was broken by Japanese soldiers. At the end of the siege, 5 French sailors, 6 Italians and about three hundred Chinese Christian refugees were killed.

== Aftermath ==
According to W. A. P. Martin, "the defense of that cathedral constitutes the most brilliant page in the history of the siege". Favier was praised in his successful defense of the cathedral as the probabilities of the Church holding out was described by Martin as being "nothing short of a miracle." According to Martin, "The new church, or of the north, which was located in open ground, was considered capable of defending itself, and Monsignor Favier courageously decided to keep it at all costs, thus preserving the lives of three thousand converts who had taken refuge there."
