= Church of the Saviour, Beijing =

Church of the Saviour
- 救世主堂
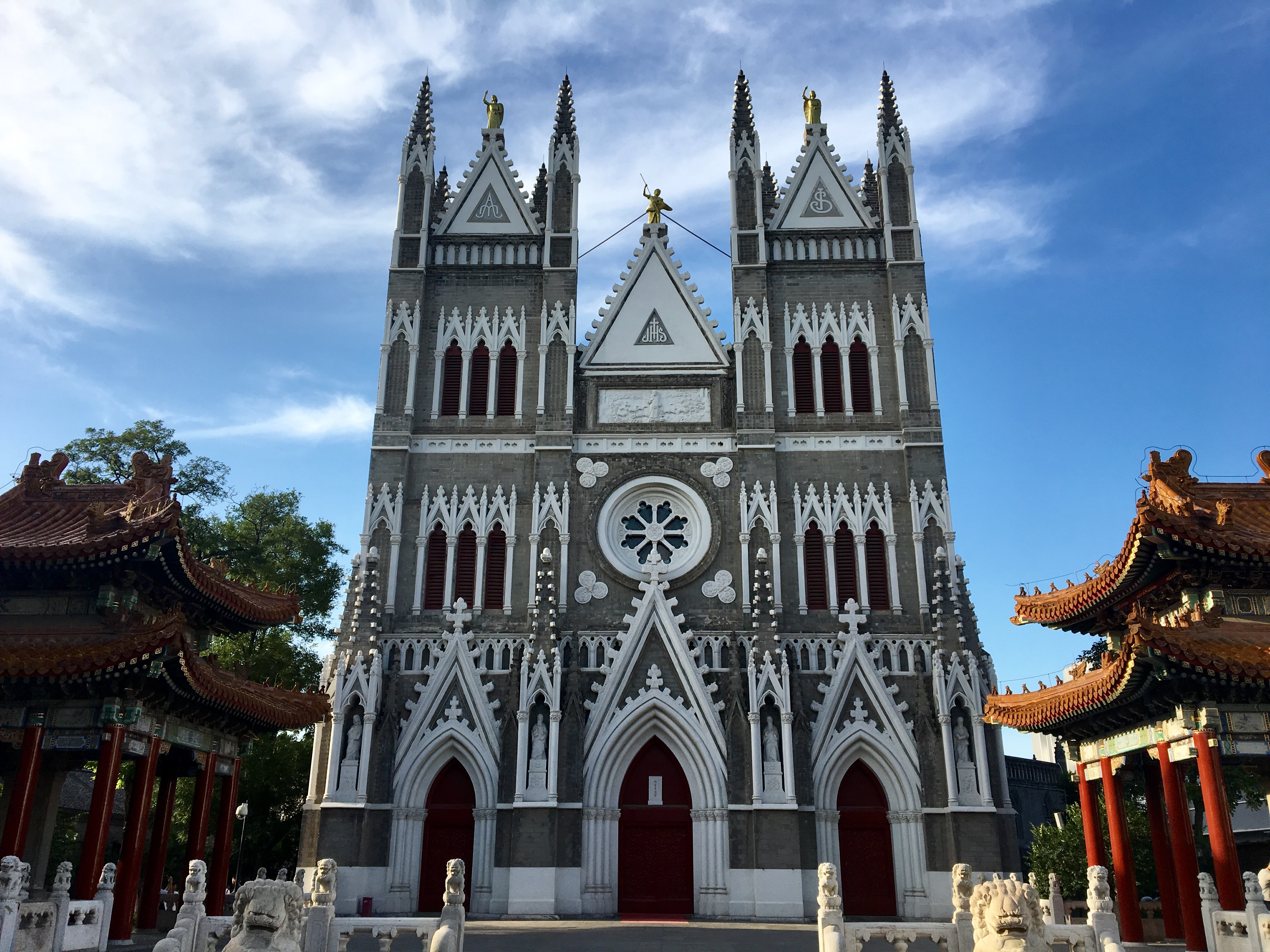
- Church of the Saviour, Beijing
- Church of the Saviour
- 39°55′26″N 116°22′21″E
- Location: Xicheng District, Beijing
- Country: China
- Denomination: Catholic Church

History
- Dedication: Christ the Saviour

Architecture
- Functional status: Active
- Architect: Alphonse Frédéric De Moerloose
- Style: Neo-Gothic
- Completed: 1703

Administration
- Archdiocese: Beijing

Church of the Saviour, Beijing
- Traditional Chinese: 救世主堂
- Simplified Chinese: 救世主堂
Transcriptions
Standard Mandarin
- Hanyu Pinyin: Xīshénkù Tiānzhǔ Táng
- Wade–Giles: Hsi1-shen2-ku4 T'ien1-chu3 T'ang2

Alternative Chinese name
- Chinese: 北堂
- Literal meaning: The North Cathedral
Transcriptions
Standard Mandarin
- Hanyu Pinyin: Běitáng
- Wade–Giles: Pei3-tang2

The Church of the Saviour (Chinese: 救世主堂), also known as the Xishiku Church (simplified Chinese: 西什库天主堂; traditional Chinese: 西什庫天主堂) or Beitang (北堂; 'North Church'), is a historic Catholic church and the cathedral church for the Archdiocese of Beijing after the 2018 renovations. The cathedral is located in the Xicheng District, Beijing, China.

== History ==
The church was originally established by the French Jesuits and completed in 1703 near Zhongnanhai (opposite the former Beijing Library), on land bestowed by the Kangxi Emperor of the Qing dynasty to the Jesuits in 1694, following his recovery from illness thanks to medical expertise of Fathers Jean-François Gerbillon and Joachim Bouvet. The emperor also hand-wrote the calligraphy plaque and couplets for the building. It was named "Saviour Church" and officially opened on 9 February 1703.

In the middle of the Qing dynasty, anti-Catholic forces in Chinese society and the Catholic Church constantly clashed. By the year 1827, the Qing government seized the North Church, and confiscated all the property. Only after the Second Opium War, did the Qing government return the land to the Catholic Church. Bishop Meng Zhensheng rebuilt the establishment into a tall Gothic building at the original site of the North Church in 1864.

In 1887 the Gothic building was moved and rebuilt at its current location, at the request of the Guangxu Emperor, who needed the original space near the Forbidden City to create the Zhongnanhai Park. The cathedral's present cast iron Gothic architectural style and elaborate grey marble facade was built in 1890, under the direction of Lazarist missionary Bishop Pierre-Marie-Alphonse Favier (1837–1905), who designed it. The church stands in a spacious grounds surrounded by pine and oak trees and two Chinese pavilions.

The interior is decorated in 1909 by Alphonse Frédéric De Moerloose, a Belgian missionary priest and architect. The church had a large Cavaille-Coll pipe organ.

The church is affiliated with the Patriotic Catholic Church of China. It was the seat of the Bishop of Beijing until 1958.

After the recent renovation, regarded by many as a classic example of 'wreckovation', the church once again became the Cathedral church of Beijing.

=== The siege of Beitang (14 June – 16 August 1900) ===
During the Boxer Uprising, the Roman Catholic Church's Beijing Northern Church (known as the Peitang, and later Beitang) was under siege by an estimated ten thousand Boxers from 14 June 1900 until 16 August 1900. In addition to Boxers, the cathedral was also attacked by Metropolitan Banner Manchus. Qing Manchu Prince Zaiyi's Manchu bannermen in the Tiger and Divine Corps led attacks against the church. Manchu official Qixiu also led attacks against the cathedral. Its defence was led by Pierre-Marie-Alphonse Favier (1837–1905), the Vicar Apostolic of the Roman Catholic Church's North Chihli Province, and architect of the cathedral. According to W.A.P. Martin, "the defence of that cathedral forms the most brilliant page in the history of the siege." Favier's "successful defense of Peking's Peitang Cathedral was nothing short of a Christian miracle." According to Martin, "The new, or northern, church, standing in an open ground by itself, was considered capable of defence. Monsignor Favier bravely resolved to hold it at all hazards, and thus preserve the lives of three thousand converts who had there taken refuge." As the cathedral was located inside the Imperial City, Beijing near the western Gate, about three kilometres (2 miles) from the Legation Quarter, it was isolated from the foreign Legations. Martin explains:

Not until the siege was raised, however, had we any conception of the severity of the conflict that devoted band had to wage in order to keep the enemy at bay; for from us, though separated only by an interval of two miles in a direct line, they were cut off from communication as completely as if they had been situated at the north pole.

The Eastern and Southern churches were heavily damaged, as were all other Roman Catholic properties in Beijing. Favier estimated that during the Boxer Uprising that between 15,000 and 20,000 members of his flock were killed and that three-quarters of the chapels were destroyed. During the siege, more than 3,900 people (including about one hundred Europeans, primarily women and children, and 850 orphans) sought sanctuary within the stone walls of the church, which was defended by only forty-one French and Italian marines, led by Paul Henry and Angelo Olivieri. Believing the church would be attacked by the Boxers, from mid-May Favier was able to collect huge stores of food, weapons and ammunition, but the large numbers of refugees necessitated severe rationing until the siege was lifted on 16 August 1900 by the Japanese military. During his trip to China in the summer of 1901, the missionary statesman Arthur Judson Brown (1856–1963) interviewed Favier, who gave detailed description of the damage inflicted during the siege:

I called on the famous Bishop. He was, for he has since died, a burly, heavily-bearded Frenchman of about sixty-five apparently. He received us most cordially and readily talked of the siege. He said that of the eighty Europeans and 3,400 Christians with him in the siege, 2,700 were women and children. Four hundred were buried, of whom forty were killed by bullets, twenty-five by one explosion, eighty-one by another and one by another. Of the rest, some died of disease but the greater part of starvation. Twenty-one children were buried at one time in one grave. Beside these 400 who were killed or who died, many more were blown to pieces in explosions so that nothing could be found to bury. Fifty-one children disappeared in this way and not a fragment remained.

== Location ==
The church can be reached from exit D of Xisi Station on Line 4 of the Beijing subway. It is situated on Xishiku Street.

== Gallery ==
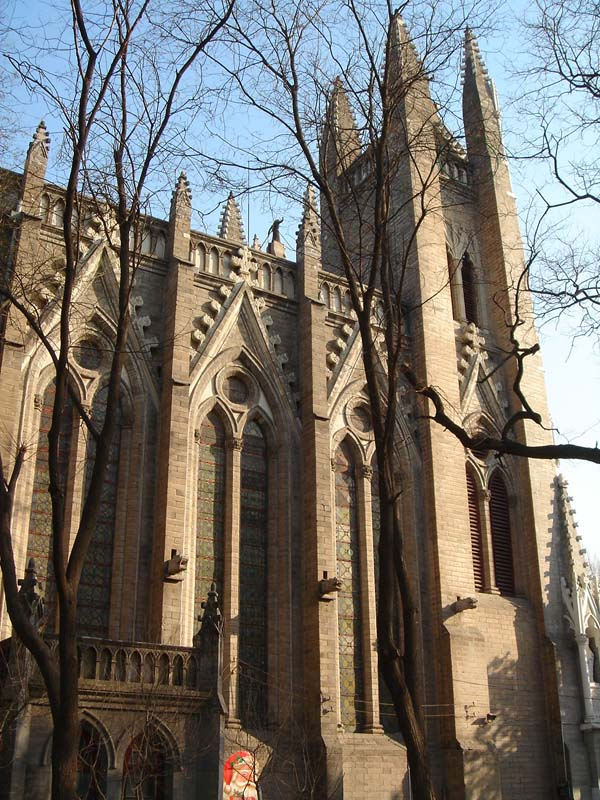
The west facade

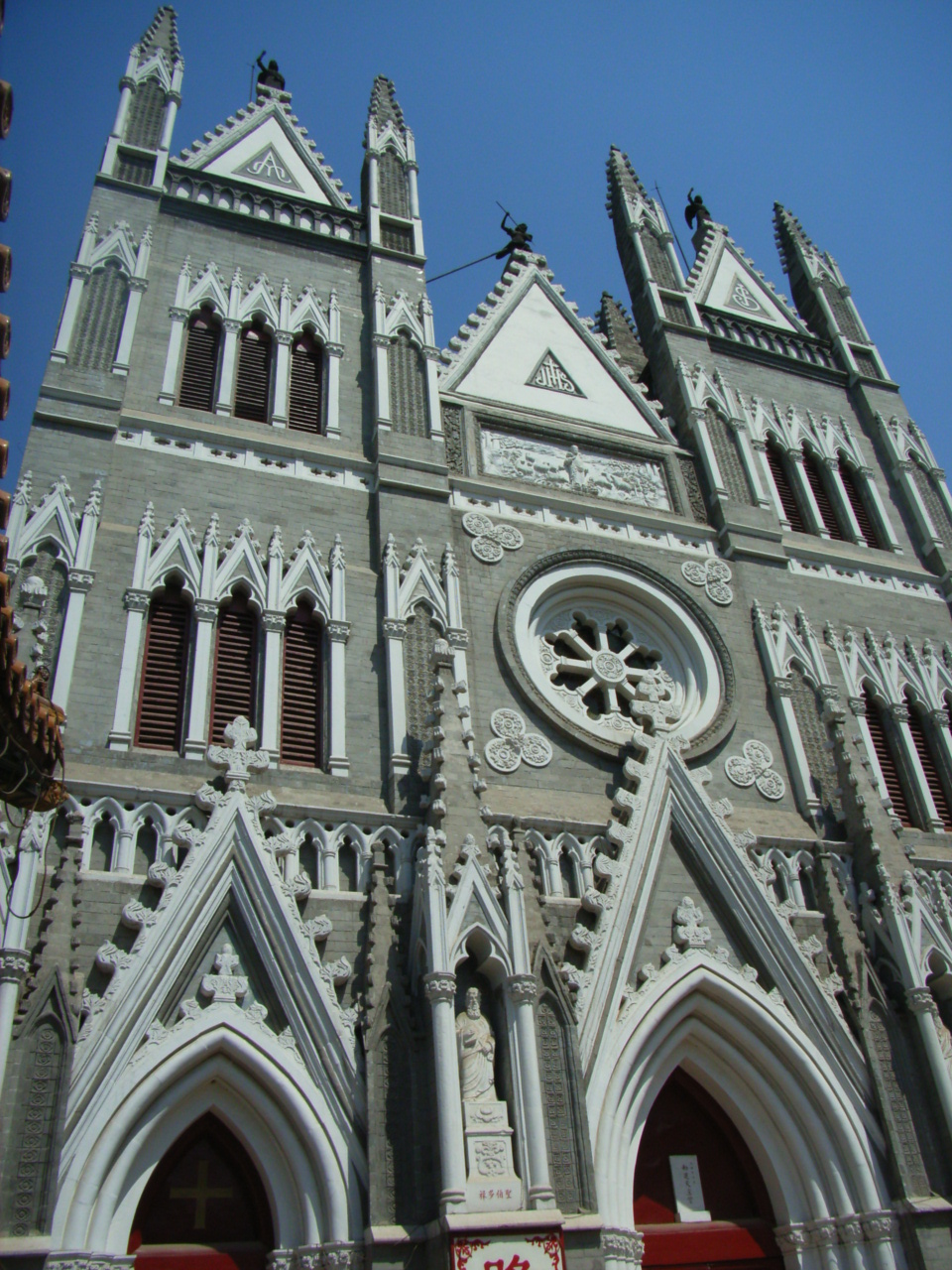
Details on the cathedral

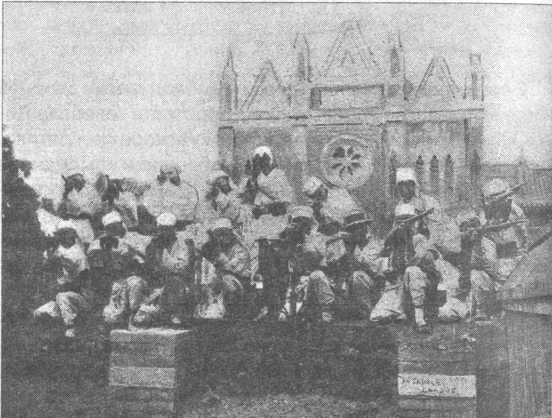
Defenders of Beitang (1900)

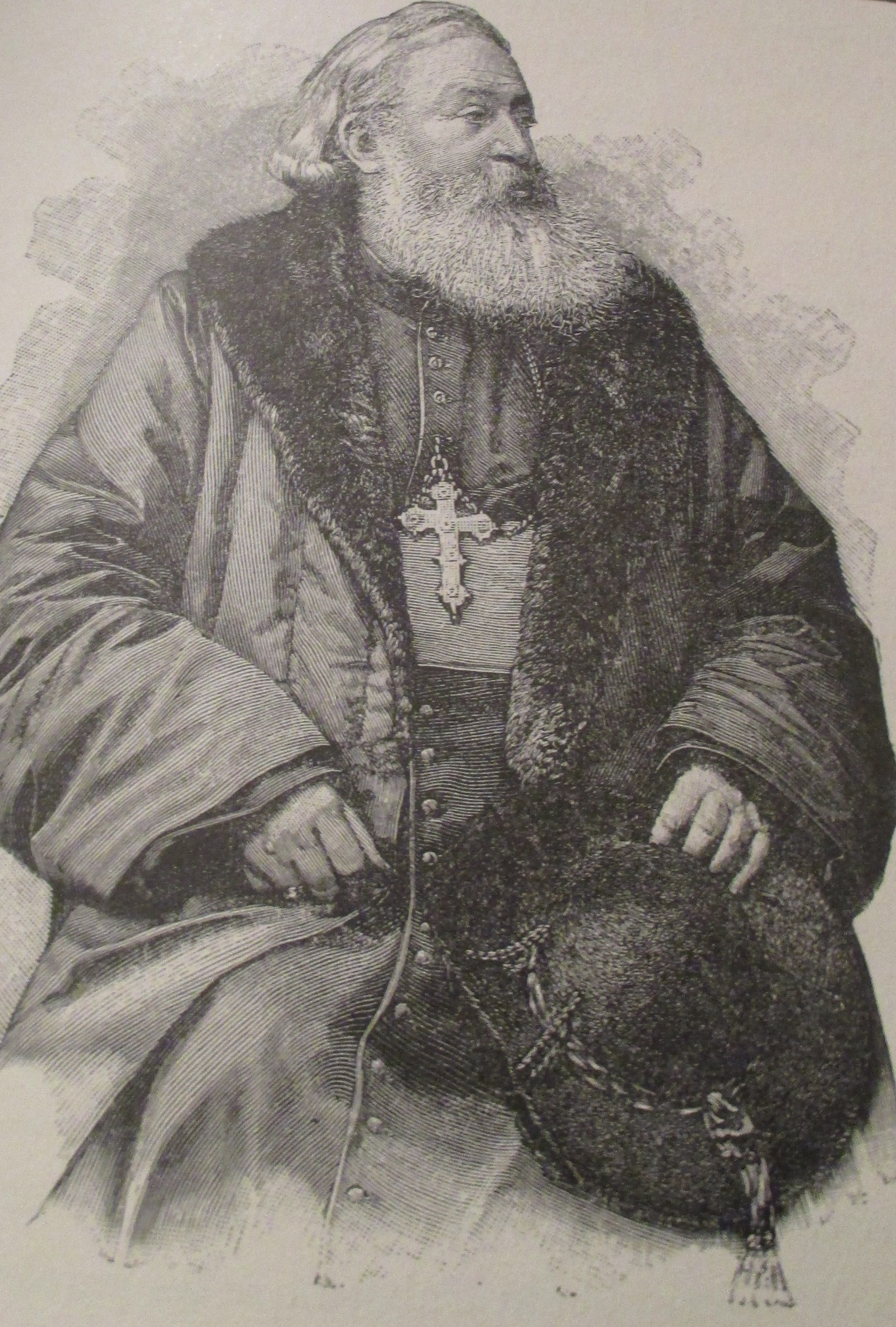
Mgr Favier in 1900

== See also ==
- Jesuit China missions
- Roman Catholic Archdiocese of Beijing
- Cathedral of the Immaculate Conception, Beijing (Nantang)
- Church of St Joseph, Beijing (Dongtang)
- Church of Our Lady of Mount Carmel, Beijing (Xitang)
- St. Michael's Church, Beijing (Donjiaomingtang)
- List of Jesuit sites
