= Alphonse Frédéric De Moerloose =

Alphonse Frédéric De Moerloose, born in Gentbrugge, Belgium, on 12 January 1858, died in Schilde, Belgium, on 27 March 1932 (aged 74) was a priest of the Congregation of the Immaculate Heart of Mary [CICM] and a Belgian architect. He was a missionary in China from 1885 to 1929 and built several Catholic churches in Inner Mongolia and North China.

== Life ==
Alphonse De Moerloose was the 10th and the youngest child of Jean-Baptiste De Moerloose and Marie-Thérèse De Jaeger, a French speaking family living in Gentbrugge, Flanders.

His father started out as a mason, to rise as a contractor and alderman in charge of public works in Gentbrugge. Two of his brothers were entrepreneurs, as well as one of his brothers-in-law, Edouard Van Herrewege, and an older sister was married to the architect Ferdinand de Noyette (1838–1870) and remarried to his brother Modeste of Noyette (1847–1923). The latter was an important architect creating civil and religious buildings in the neo-Gothic style in Flanders. Alphonse De Moerloose must have been influenced by his brother-in-law Modeste de Noyette. He began by studying architecture brilliantly from 1876. He obtained on 7 August 1881 the first prize in the fifth year of his studies in architecture at the École supérieure des arts Saint-Luc in Ghent.

At that time, the education of this school lasted seven years with evening and weekend lessons. During the day, he probably had to work with his father. The most gifted students could follow an eighth year which led to the "Grand Prix". The milieu of the Saint-Luc school of the arts defended an ultramontane Catholicism opposed to the secularization of society and to liberalism. Under the influence of Baron Jean-Baptiste Bethune and the theories of Augustus Pugin, the Saint Luke Schools promoted a rational and archaeological neo-Gothic style. As a missionary architect in China, Alphonse De Moerloose exported the puginesque Saint Luke Gothic style to North China and Inner Mongolia.

The De Moerloose family was very Catholic. Driven by a missionary desire De Moerloose entered the Seminary of Scheut, in Anderlecht (south-west Brussels) of the Congregation of the Immaculate Heart of Mary in October 1881, founded in 1862 by Théophile Verbist. This missionary congregation had been assigned by the Congregation for the Evangelization of Peoples, in 1865, the apostolic mission of Mongolia. Alphonse De Moerloose was ordained a priest on 7 June 1884 and pronounced his religious vows in the chapel of the seminary of Scheut on 6 February 1885.

He arrived in China in 1885 and was assigned to the Apostolic Vicariate of the Province of Gansu whose evangelization was entrusted in 1878 by the Holy See to the CICM Fathers, who had established missions in the cities of Lanzhou, Liangzhou and Ganzhou. His notes and articles show his interest for Chinese craftsmanship and architecture.

The missionary Alphonse De Moerloose then adopted a Chinese name He Gengbo (和羹柏). He spent a year in the residence of Xixiang, in Wuwei (Gansu) to learn the basics of the Chinese language, then worked in rural and urban parishes. In 1898, Father Jérôme Van Aertselaer (1845–1924) was appointed vicar apostolic of Central Mongolia where he had previously been director of the seminary before being, between 1887 and 1898, superior general of the CICM congregation. He redirected De Moerloose's career by commissioning him architectural works. In February 1899, he moved from Gansu to Xiwanzi (西湾子), today Chongli, in Hebei Province, seat of the Vicariate apostolic of Central Mongolia where he began work on a major seminary with a chapel and the bishop's residence. At the same time begins the Boxer uprising that killed thousands of Christians and destroyed a large number of churches. Benefiting from state indemnities, Van Aertselaer rebuilt the CICM mission and so De Moerloose became a famous missionary architect en promoter of Gothic style churches in North China. The CICM archives in China were destroyed after their departure and those of Louvain are incomplete, making it difficult to complete a list of all the buildings he designed and built in China. These buildings includes cathedrals, parish churches, schools, orphanages, residences for missionaries, to meet the growing needs of the mission. His reputation made his also work for other missionary congregations such as the French Jesuits, Trappists, and Lazarists.

From 1903 to 1905, he designed and built the church of the Trappist abbey of Notre-Dame-de-la-Consolation in Yangjiaping (禓家坪) founded in the spring of 1883 by French Trappists from Sept-Fons. attracted by a more contemplative life, he left CICM in December 1909, became a priest incardinated in the diocese of Beijing, and set up his studio in the enclosure of Yangjiaping Abbey.

From 1910 to the late 1920s, he built designed several large neo-Gothic brick churches for Lazarist missionaries. His most prestigious commission was the Marian pilgrimage church of Our Lady of Sheshan, on the top of a hill in the outskirts of Shanghai. His first design in Saint Luke Gothic style (1920) was rejected by the French Jesuits of Shanghai who asked him to adapt his plans in Romanesque style (1923).

Nevertheless, from the mid-1920s the medieval paradigm of Pugin, Bethune and the Saint Luke schools definitely belong to the past. In China, archbishop Celso Costantini, criticized Western styles and promoted indigenized Chinese Catholic art and architecture. In 1929, after 44 years uninterrupted stay in China, De Moerloose, aged 73, returned to Belgium and died in Schilde in 1932.

== Constructed buildings ==
Most of Father De Moerloose's churches have been demolished. Except the basilica of Sheshan, his best preserved work is the cathedral of Xuanhua (Hebei province).

- Beijing, North Church (Beitang), interior decoration (1909) for Lazarist missionaries
- Datong (Shanxi), regional seminary (1922–1928)
- Gaojiayingzi (Hebei), parish church (1903–1905)
- Huangtuliang (Hebei), parish church (1906)
- Meiguiyinzi (Inner Mongolia), parish church (1904–1906)
- Nihewan (Hebei), chapel and residence (1912)
- Shanghai, Yangtze-poo parish church (1924–1926)
- Shanghai, Basilica of Sheshan, plans (1920–1923) for Jesuit missionaries, built by Jesuit Father François-Xavier Diniz .
- Shebiya / Chabernoor (Inner Mongolia), parish church (1904–1905)
- Shuangshuzi (Hebei), parish church and residence (1917)
- Xiwanzi / Chongli (Hebei), seminary (1902)
- Xuanhua (Hebei), church, later cathedral (1903–1906) for Lazarist missionaries
- Yangjiaping (Hebei), Trappist Abbey of Notre-Dame-de-Consolation (1903–1905 and 1922), daughter of Sept-Fons Abbey
- Yongping (Hebei), cathedral (1908–1910) for Lazarist missionaries
- Zhengding (Hebei), parish church (1924)

== Bibliography ==
: Documents used as source for writing this article.

- Aubin Françoise, 1983. A technical vocabulary notebook from Father De Moerloose's CICM, missionary from Scheut (northern Gansu, end of the 19th century). ^{Cahiers} de Linguistique - Asie Orientale, 12/2, p. 103–117 ( read online ) [ archive ]
- Coomans Thomas, 2016. Pugin Worldwide. From Les Vrais Principes and the Belgian St Luke Schools to Northern China and Inner Mongolia. In: Brittain-Catlin Timothy, De Maeyer Jan, and Bressani Martin, eds. Gothic Revival Worldwide: AWN Pugin's Global Influence (KADOC Artes 16). Leuven: Leuven University Press, 2016, p. 156–171 ISBN 978-94-6270-091-8
- Coomans Thomas, 2013. Sint-Lucasneogotiek in Noord-China: Alphonse De Moerloose, missionaris en architect. M&L. Monumenten, Landschappen en Archeologie, 32/5, 6-33 ISSN 0770-4984
- Coomans Thomas, 2018. Our Lady of Sheshan in Shanghai, Basilica of the French Jesuits in China. Monumental Bulletin, 176 (2), 129–156, ISBN 978-2-901837-72-5
- Coomans Thomas, 2018. East Meets West on the Construction Site. Churches in China, 1840s-1930s". Construction History, 33 (2), 63–84 ISSN 0267-7768.
- Coomans Thomas 高曼士, 2023. Sheshan jiaotang xunzong: jianzhu, chaosheng, lishi tujing (Kaifang de Shanghai chengshi jianzhu shi congshu, 3) 佘山教堂寻踪: 朝圣建筑和历史途径 (开放的上海城市建筑史丛书, 3) [Sheshan Marian Shrine in Shanghai: Architecture, Space, and Symbolism], Shanghai: Tongji University Press, p. 169–220 ISBN 978-7-5765-0816-1.
- Coomans Thomas, and Luo Wei 罗薇, 2012. Exporting Flemish Gothic Architecture to China: Meaning and Context of the Churches of Shebiya (Inner Mongolia) and Xuanhua (Hebei) built by Missionary-Architect Alphonse De Moerloose in 1903-1906. Relicta. Heritage Research in Flanders, 9, 219–262 ( read online ) [ archive ]
- Luo Wei 罗薇, 2013. Transmission and Transformation of European Church Types in China: The Churches of the Scheut Missions beyond the Great Wall, 1865-1955. PhD thesis, KU Leuven, 505 p. ISBN 978-94-6018-626-4.
- Van Hecken Joseph, 1968. Alphonse Frédéric De Moerloose CICM (1858-1932) and his work as an architect in China. Neue Zeitschrift für Missionwissenschaft / New Review of Missionary Science, 24 (3), 161–178.
