= Alphonse Favier =

Catholic bishop (1837–1905)

Pierre-Marie-Alphonse Favier

Pierre-Marie-Alphonse Favier-Duperron C.M.(Chinese: 樊國樑 Pinyin:Fan Guoliang Wade-Giles: Fan Kouo-Léang) (born 22 September 1837 at Marsannay-la-Côte, France; died 4 April 1905 in Beijing) was the Catholic Lazarist Vicar Apostolic of Northern Zhili, China (now incorporating the Roman Catholic Archdiocese of Beijing) and titular bishop of Pentacomia from 13 April 1899 until his death in 1905. During the Boxer Uprising of 1900, Favier was responsible for the defence and preservation of the Beitang Cathedral (lit. "North Cathedral") in Beijing, and the protection of thousands of Chinese Catholic Christians. In the aftermath of the Boxer Uprising, Favier was accused of looting.

== Biographical details ==
Pierre-Marie-Alphonse Favier

Pierre-Marie Alphonse Favier-Duperron (French: Alphonse Favier) was born on 22 September 1837 at Marsannay-la-Côte (Côte-d'Or), France.

=== Education ===
Before entering the ministry of the Catholic Church, Favier trained as an architect. He was able to use that training to design and supervise the construction of Beijing's Beitang Cathedral. After Favier studied literature at the seminary at Plombières, he transferred to the Dijon seminary where he studied philosophy and a year of theology.

=== Religious preparation ===
Favier entered the Catholic Church's Congregation of Mission (known as the Lazarists or Vincentians) in Paris on 5 October 1858. On 6 October 1860 he indicated his desire to be a priest. At the General Assembly of the Congregation of Mission held from 27 July to 4 August 1861, Monsigneur Joseph-Martial Mouly (孟振生), C.M. (born 2 August 1807; died 4 December 1868), the then Vicar Apostolic of China's North Zhili province, which was centred on Beijing, attended and spoke of the new possibilities of evangelisation in China after the Convention of Peking of 1860. Mgr Mouly wanted missionaries and sisters to accompany him on his return to China. Favier was one of those who responded affirmatively to Mouly's invitation.

Alphonse Favier was ordained a priest on 19 October 1861 in the Chapelle Notre Dame de la Médaille Miraculeuse by bishop Mouly.

=== Missionary service in China (1862–1905) ===
==== Missionary priest 1862–1897 ====
Alphonse Favier sailed from Toulon, France on 20 February 1862 on the Descartes, travelling with Bishop Mouly, and three other missionaries (including Jean Pierre Armand David C.M. (1826–1900)), two lay-brothers, and fourteen Daughters of Charity. After sailing east across the Mediterranean to Alexandria, Egypt, the missionary band travelled overland to the Red Sea, where they embarked on the Japon for their journey to China. After passing the Gulf of Aden and entering the Indian Ocean, their little ship sprang a leak and was beached (probably on the northern coastal tip of Somalia). After their ship was repaired, they continued to China. Favier arrived in Peking (now Beijing), China on 5 July 1862.

In China Favier had an active pastoral ministry. At the time of the Tianjin Massacre of 21 June 1870, Favier was director of the Lazarist work in the district of Xuanhuafu, about 180 kilometres northwest of Beijing. In the absence of the Vicar Apostolic, Favier negotiated with the Chinese authorities to ensure the re-building of the damaged church property.

Later Favier became the principal administrative assistant in Beijing, and in that capacity was able to successfully facilitate the introduction of the Trappists into China in April 1883, and the Marist Brothers into China in +1891.

Favier was also appointed architect and supervisor of construction for the new Beitang Cathedral in Beijing, which was constructed for $160,000 at the Emperor's expense and completed by 1887.

After meeting Favier in 1895, Sir Henry Norman (1854–1939) described Favier as "the finest specimen of a priest I have ever met, a beau sabreur of the Church, who wears Chinese dress and his hair in a queue, who speaks Chinese perfectly, who has even been decorated with a sapphire button by the Emperor."

In 1897 Favier wrote Peking, histoire et description, a general history of Peking that included reproductions of photographs of the city by artists such as Thomas Child, which was subsequently revised after the Boxer Uprising.

==== Titular Bishop of Pentacomia (1897) ====
On 12 November 1897, Favier was appointed Coadjutor Vicar Apostolic of Northern Zhili, China, as well as the Titular Bishop of Pentacomia. As a result of "direct representations made by the Emperor" to the Holy See, Favier was consecrated Titular Bishop of Pentacomia, in Beijing on 20 February 1898 by Bishop Jules Bruguière C.M. (12 August 1851 – 19 October 1906), the then Vicar Apostolic of Southwestern Zhili.

Favier was responsible for negotiating the imperial decree of 15 March 1899 that placed Catholic bishops on a par with the Chinese governors and governors general, an unpopular move with a number of Catholics, Protestants and the Chinese. According to the Catholic Encyclopedia:

An important imperial decree of 15 March 1899, established on an official basis the relations between the Catholic clergy and the local authorities of China; the bishops were placed on an equal footing with the viceroys and the governors, the vicars—general ranked with the treasurers, provincial judges and Tao—t'ai, priests with prefects. This decree was signed at the suggestion of Bishop Favier of Peking, but its wisdom has been much disputed.

As a consequence, the Qing Government granted him the official uniform of the second rank as an indication of courteous reception. The second rank wore "a red coral button and robe embroidered with a golden pheasant; the girdle clasp of gold set in rubies".

==== Vicar Apostolic of Northern Zhili (1899–1905) ====
Upon the death of his predecessor, Bishop Jean-Baptiste-Hippolyte Sarthou, C.M. (24 April 1840 – 13 April 1899), Favier became Vicar Apostolic of Northern Zhili on 13 April 1899. In that capacity Favier played a big part in keeping the Holy See and China apart, in that he influenced the Holy See to abandon its plan to send a nuncio (apostolic delegate) to China who would exercise powers independent of the Western Powers. Favier was in favor of maintaining the status quo of the French Protectorate. In 1900, Favier wrote in an updated edition of his Peking, histoire et description:

Once again we have seen the necessity of French protection of the Catholic missions as it has always been exercised and which the Church has never wanted to end. Accordingly, one will always see a consulate next to a church. The building where the French tricolor flies will always protect the Catholic cross."

According to Camps, "China has never forgotten that Church and imperialism thus worked together."

According to John G. Birch (ca.1846–1900), who visited Favier in early 1899 in Beijing, Favier "is a delightful old gentleman, with a tall burly figure, but seemed hardly episcopal, as, clad a la chinoise, and smoking a long cheroot." According to E.G. Ruoff, "Father Favier ...was a friend of Prince (sic) Jung-Lu, and was considered by many to be the best informed European on Chinese affairs." However, Favier argued that "one should talk with the Chinese with 'a stick in one hand and a dollar in the other' – only then would they understand everything one told them!"

=== Favier's warning letter of 19 May 1900 ===
George Ernest Morrison, the correspondent for The Times, no great fan of missionaries, "was full of praise for the foresight and preparedness of Bishop Favier." "No one knew more about the Boxer menace than Monsignor Alphonse-Pierre Favier, Roman Catholic Bishop of Peking." John Stuart Thomson agreed: "No foreigner in China was as accurate in his prophecies of coming political and massacres as the Roman Catholic bishop of Peking, Monsieur Favir [sic.]."

In a letter of 19 May 1900 to Stéphen Pichon, the French Minister to China, Favier reported increased persecution of Christians in Baoding (here romanized as Pao-ting-fu), including the murder of local Christians, and that he believed there was imminent danger of anti-European and anti-Christian activities by the Boxers. He indicated the Boxer uprising would spread to Beijing, and that both churches and the foreign Legations would be attacked. He requested guards to protect the Beitang cathedral (here romanized as Pe-tang).

Favier's letter read:

" The situation is becoming daily more and more serious and threatening. In the Prefecture of Pao-ting-fu more than seventy Christians have been massacred, three other neophytes have been cut to pieces. Several villages have been looted and burnt, a yet greater number of others have been completely deserted. Over 2,000 Christians are fugitives, without food, clothes, or shelter; in Pekin alone about 400 refugees — men, women, and children — have already been given shelter by us and the Sisters; in another week's time we shall probably have several thousands to look after; we shall be obliged to disband the schools, colleges, and all the hospitals, to make room for these unfortunate people. On the east, pillage and incendiarism are imminent; we receive more and more alarming news every hour. Pekin is surrounded on all sides; the Boxers are daily approaching the capital, being only delayed by the measures they are taking for destroying all the Christian settlements. I beg you will be assured, M. le Ministre, that I am well informed, and am making no statements at random. The religious persecution is only a blind; the main object is to exterminate the Europeans, and this object is clearly indicated and written on the Boxers' standards. Their accomplices in Pekin are awaiting them; they are to begin by an attack on the churches, and are finally to assault the Legations. For us, indeed, here at Pe-tang, the day of attack has actually been fixed; the whole town knows it, everybody is talking about it, and the popular excitement is clearly manifest. Last night, again, forty-three poor women, with their children, flying from massacre, arrived at the Sisters' home; over 500 people accompanied them, telling them that, although they had succeeded in escaping once, they would soon all perish here with the rest. I will not speak of the numberless placards, M. le Ministre, which are posted in the town against Europeans in general; new notices appear daily, each more clearly expressed than the last. People who were present at the massacres in Tientsin 30 years ago are struck by the similarity of the situation then with that of to-day; there are the same placard's, the same threats, the same notices, and the same want of foresight. Then also, as to-day, the missionaries wrote and begged, foreseeing the horrible awakening. In these circumstances, M. le Ministre, I think it is my duty to request you to send us, at least to Pe-tang, 40 or 50 sailors, to protect us and our belongings. This has been done on much less critical occasions, and I trust you will favourably consider my humble application.

In 1901 Favier's diary of the siege in the Beitang was published as The Heart of Pekin: Bishop A. Favier's Diary of the Siege, May–August 1900, as was his article, Siège de la mission catholique du Pé-tang.

=== The siege of the Beitang ===
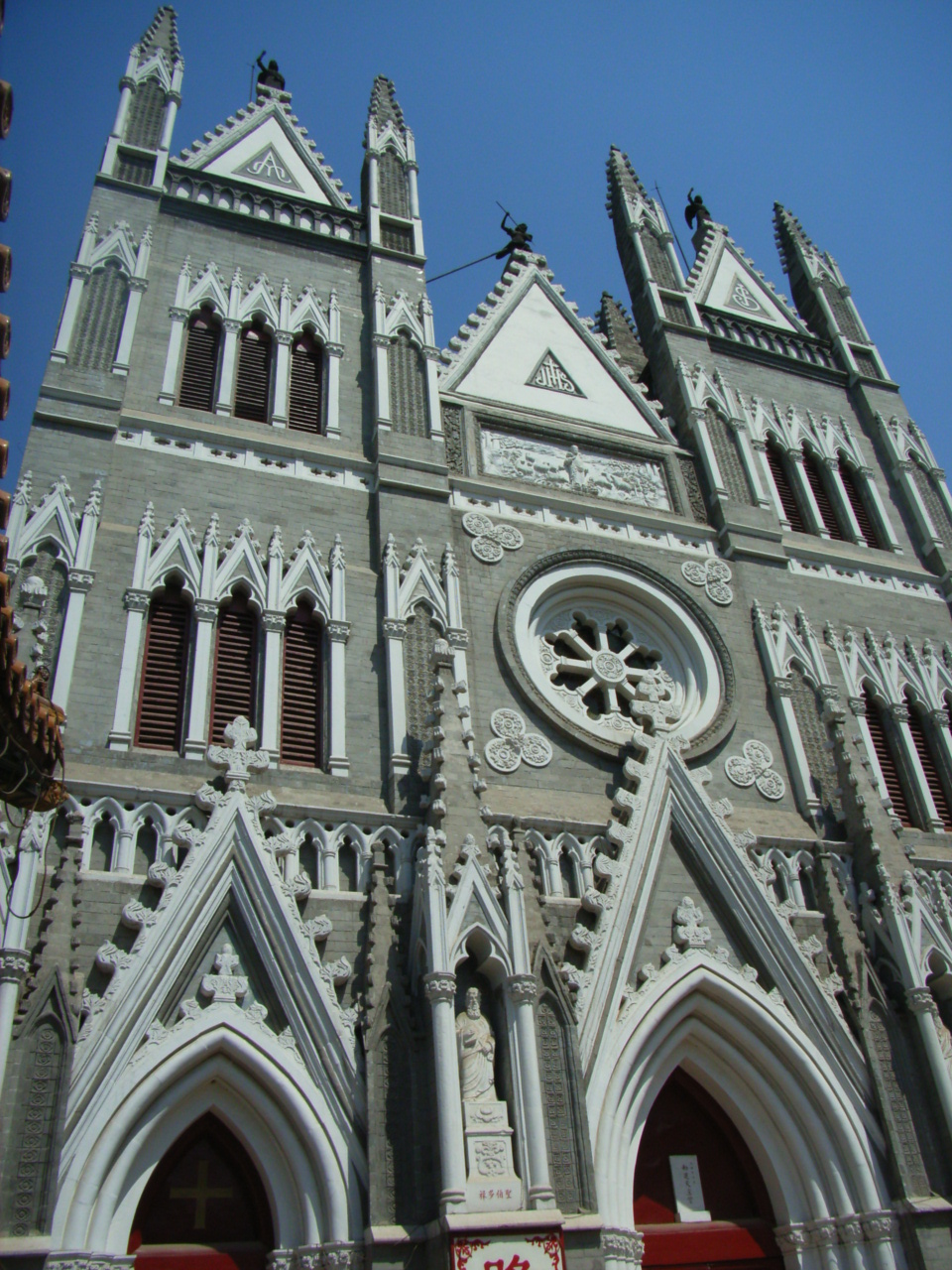
Beitang Cathedral

The Beitang Cathedral, located in the Xicheng district of Beijing, was placed under siege by an estimated ten thousand Boxers from 14 June 1900 until 16 August 1900. Professor Joseph Esherick recounts that "the Boxers concentrated most of their energy on the siege of the Catholics' Northern Cathedral. This was the last remaining church in the city, and some 10,000 Boxers joined in the siege" According to Mei Qianli, the Boxers assaulted the church for sixty-two days, and the siege was not stopped until foreign armies marched into Beijing to restore peace.

According to W.A.P. Martin, "the defence of that cathedral forms the most brilliant page in the history of the siege." Favier's "successful defense of Peking's Peitang Cathedral was nothing short of a Christian miracle." According to Martin, "The new, or northern, cathedral, standing in an open ground by itself, was considered capable of defence. Monsignor Favier bravely resolved to hold it at all hazards, and thus preserve the lives of three thousand converts who had there taken refuge." As the cathedral was located inside the Imperial City, Beijing near the western Gate, about three kilometres (2 miles) from the Legation Quarter, it was isolated from the foreign Legations. Martin explains:

Not until the siege was raised, however, had we any conception of the severity of the conflict that devoted band had to wage in order to keep the enemy at bay; for from us, though separated only by an interval of two miles in a direct line, they were cut off from communication as completely as if they had been situated at the north pole.

The Dongtang (Eastern) and Nantang (Southern) Cathedrals were also destroyed, as were all other Catholic properties in Zhili province. Favier estimated that during the Boxer Uprising that between 15,000 and 20,000 members of his 'flock' and that three-quarters of the chapels were destroyed. Bishop Favier accepted compensation for destroyed buildings, but nothing for the loss of human life.

During the siege, more than 3,900 people (including about one hundred Europeans, primarily women and children, and 850 orphans) sought sanctuary within the stone walls of the cathedral, which was defended by only forty-one French and Italian marines, led by an Italian and a French officer. Believing the cathedral would be attacked by the Boxers, from mid-May Favier was able to collect huge stores of food, weapons and ammunition, but the large numbers of refugees necessitated severe rationing until the siege was lifted on 16 August 1900 by the Japanese military. During his trip to China in the summer of 1901, missionary statesman Arthur Judson Brown (1856–1963) interviewed Favier, who gave detailed description of the damage inflicted during the siege:

I called on the famous Bishop. He was, for he has since died, a burly, heavily-bearded Frenchman of about sixty-five apparently. He received us most cordially and readily talked of the siege. He said that of the eighty Europeans and 3,400 Christians with him in the siege, 2,700 were women and children. Four hundred were buried, of whom forty were killed by bullets, twenty-five by one explosion, eighty-one by another and one by another. Of the rest, some died of disease but the greater part of starvation. Twenty-one children were buried at one time in one grave. Beside these 400 who were killed or who died, many more were blown to pieces in explosions so that nothing could be found to bury. Fifty-one children disappeared in this way and not a fragment remained.

=== After the Boxer uprising (1900–1905) ===
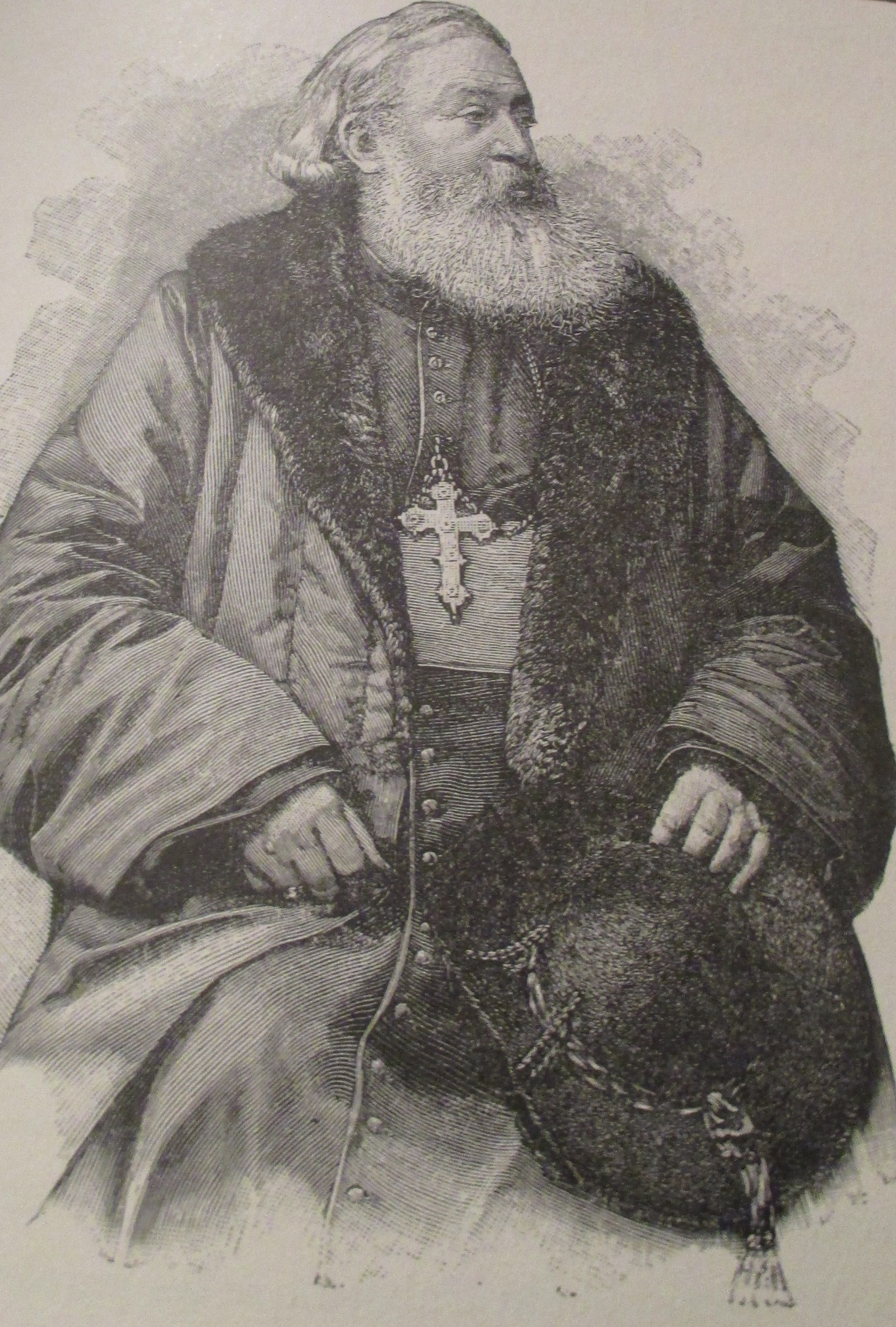
Mgr Favier in 1900.

In 1901 the Catholic Church conferred the title "Religious Guard " on Favier, for his role in defending the Beitang, and the preservation of the lives of many Christians. the Guangxu Emperor honoured Favier by awarding him the red button of the first mandarins. Additionally, in 1901 Favier was made a Chevalier of the Legion of Honor.

In 1905 Favier wrote Yanjing kaijiao lue, which was a short history of the founding of the Church in Beijing.

=== Death (1905) ===
On 4 April 1905, Favier died in Beijing at the age of 67, and was buried in the Beitang Cathedral.

== Criticisms ==
=== Critique by Lanxin Xiang ===
Lanxin Xiang, Professor of International History and Politics at the Graduate Institute of International Studies in Geneva, Switzerland, believes Favier contributed greatly to the anti-foreign and anti-Catholic feelings of Chinese villagers prior to the Boxer Uprising. Xiang in his The Origins of the Boxer War is sceptical of Favier's statistics, accusing Favier of distorting the facts (186) and exaggerating the situation. For example, after an incident on 12 May 1900 in Kaolo (now Gao Luo) village in Laishui County,

Mgr. Favier immediately claimed that 68 converts were killed, all the houses owned by the Church and the converts were burnt. However, the Chinese investigators who arrived at the village reported the burning of churches and houses, but cited a much lower number of casualties than that given by Bishop Favier. The death toll was not more than five.

Xiang adds: "After the rampage, the Gao Luo Boxers went to a neighboring county and burnt several houses belonged to the converts, but killing nobody. Favier again claimed that 'all houses were burnt there and the converts killed were countless." Favier's report implied, for the first time, that the actions of the Boxers had the official authorisation of the Chinese government. "Thus the Chinese government's complicity at once became self-evident to the diplomatic corps." According to Xiang,

Favier's version of a great 'massacre' in Laishui sent a shock wave through the foreign community in Beijing. It was unanimously accepted as the truth by the diplomats and the other foreign residents.... Favier's exaggeration brought about a psychological turning point at the Legations. As no one doubted its authenticity.

Further, Xiang asserts that Favier's myopic view of riots distorted his perception of the causes, only blaming the non-converts for disputes, and insisting that only they be punished, thus creating increased resentment: "The relationship between the government soldiers and the local population deteriorated rapidly. Worse still, the government soldiers were often indiscriminate in their military operations". As Favier was close to Pichon, "the picture given to Pichon was inevitably dark and extremely pessimistic."

=== Critique by d'Addosio ===
One of Favier's subordinates, Vincentian Father P. Pasquale Raffaele d'Addosio (born 19 December 1835 in Brescia, Italy; martyred 15 August 1900 by the Boxers in Beijing), often criticised Favier to Marquis Giuseppe Salvago-Raggi, the Italian minister to China since 1899, accusing him of being power-hungry, thus confirming "the Italian minister's suspicions about the insincerity and ulterior motives of the Catholic missionaries."

=== Looting controversy ===
Despite pillage and the confiscation of private property being prohibited explicitly in the Hague Conventions of 1899, which each nation of the Eight-Nation Alliance had signed, James Hevia indicates that "looting in 1900 was a major point of contention and public debate in China, the United States, and Western Europe." Historian Thoralf Klein explains the paradoxical nature of the actions of the Eight-Nation Alliance:

The Qing Empire had been represented at the Hague Peace Conference in 1899, but the Chinese delegate had not signed its most important document, the Laws and Customs of War on Land. The ensuing legal insecurity made it possible for violations not only of international law, but also of national military penal law ... to go unpunished. One of the few critics who explicitly denounced the disregard for international law shown by the Allied troops was the journalist George Lynch (1901: 303 ff.). Legal discourse thus created a double ambivalence on the Allied side: at a theoretical level, the intervention was designed to enforce international law in a country that refused to acknowledge it. At a practical level, the method of enforcing international law consisted in its constant violation.

Favier condemned the international relief expedition's excessive use of force against the Chinese rebels, however looting was commonplace and extensive in the aftermath of the Boxer Uprising. Hevia indicates that a "loot fever gripped the armies and Euroamerican civilian population in Beijing. and a wild orgy of plunder ensued. Moreover, many accounts agree that few if any were immune from loot fever." Payson Jackson Treat (1879–1972) observed that "with few exceptions all the foreigners, military and civilians, took part in the loot, either directly or by purchases from the original marauders." According to Simon Au:

Contrary to what some historians write, there appears to be little difference in conduct by soldiers from different countries. Jasper Whiting, an American war correspondent, wrote that the looting of Beijing was the most extraordinary and the most outrageous proceeding connected with the Boxer troubles. From his observations, it was not confined to any set of individuals or to any nationality, nor was it confined to the men. In fact, he was told that women had started it. Simpson sums up the activity in one of his letters: "...Then we came across Americans, again some French, then some Germans, until it became an endless procession of looting men—conquerors and conquered mixed and indifferent...". There are official auctions now being organized, where you will be able to buy legally, and after the approved methods, every kind of loot.

The commander of the Eight-Nation Alliance forces, Count Alfred von Waldersee speaking of the looting by the French forces, indicated in an article "Plundering Peking":

Some of the loot was delivered to Bishop Favier to compensate him and his converts for their own fearful losses. Favier sold these articles little by little. I personally bought a number of furs from him at a very low price.

==== Accusations against Favier ====
One of the first to publish accusations against Favier, and other missionaries (including William Scott Ament of the Protestant American Board of Commissioners for Foreign Missions) was Wilbur J. Chamberlin, the correspondent for the New York Sun, who, in a letter to his wife in December 1900, wrote:

Since the raising of the siege in Peking the Catholic Cathedral here has at times been turned into a salesroom for stolen property. I talked to-day with a man who had himself purchased more than 7,000 taels, worth of stolen property from this man. The word "stolen" is, of course, pretty harsh. The army softens it into loot, and the missionaries speak of it as "reimbursement." What it really is is taking property belonging to another against the wishes of the owner and converting it into money and using that money for purposes not sanctioned by the owner, and if the dictionary does not define that as stealing then there must be something wrong with the dictionary.

Yuan Chang (1846–1900)

In February 1901, while on furlough in France, Favier heard that he was being accused of looting. The 10 February 1901 edition of The New York Times reported accusations against Favier by

"the family of Lu-Sen (Chinese Minister of Foreign Affairs executed by the Empress Dowager because he would not sanction the anti-foreign movement), that the Archbishop had looted their house of money and valuables aggregating in value a million taels the day after the siege was raised."

"Lu-Sen" was actually Yuan Chang (Chinese: 袁昶) (born 1846; executed 29 July 1900), a qing (minister), who according to Article II of the Boxer Protocol signed on 7 September 1901, "was the Vice-President of the Court of Sacrifices, who had been "put to death for having protested against the outrageous breaches of international law of last year". Yuang Chang had tried to dissuade Dowager-Empress Cixi from supporting the Boxers and attacking the foreign legations in Beijing. Yuan Chang and fellow reformer Xu Jingcheng (Chinese: 許景澄, pinyin: Xǔ Jǐngchéng; Wade-Giles: Hsü Ching-ch'eng) (Born 1845; beheaded 29 July 1900) the Chinese Minister of Foreign Affairs, had sent in three petitions to Cixi in a futile attempt to stop the attacks on the embassies, as well as to encourage the suppression of the Boxers. According to Klein:

In July 1900, the high-ranking officials Yuan Chang and Xu Jingcheng repeatedly warned the throne that the murder of envoys was not only forbidden by the "Spring and Autumn Annals", but also by international law, and that a punitive action by the powers was sure to follow. This challenge of the hawks at court brought about their downfall; both were subsequently executed.

Favier was accused of selling a confiscated collection of porcelain to Herbert G. Squiers, the First Secretary of the American Legation, and a member of Favier's congregation. Jasper Whiting, war correspondent for the Westminster Gazette, wrote that "the best collection of loot obtained belonged to Lady MacDonald, the wife of the British minister, while the second-best belonged to the First Secretary of the American Legation." Investigative journalist Sterling Seagrave asserts that "great fortunes were made by those like Herbert Squiers, who knew where to find the richest pickings and chose his loot as a connoisseur". Squiers left Beijing on 2 September 1901 "with what was reported to be several railway cars filled with Chinese art", which Squiers indicated was to be donated to the Metropolitan Museum of Art in New York. Among those critical of the origins of Squiers' donation to the Metropolitan Museum was the New Outlook magazine, which claimed the "collection of fine Chinese porcelain [was] known to have been looted from palaces in Peking." In response to criticism that this collection was the result of looting, both the New York Metropolitan Museum of Art and the U.S. State department officials were sceptical that this was a large collection of loot. His collection was on loan to the United States National Museum (better known as The Smithsonian Institution) in Washington, D.C. from 1907 to 1908. After his death, his collection was sold at auction in New York in April 1912, and realised over $48,000. The method of which Squiers used to acquire his collection of Chinese art continued to be criticized as lately as 2003, with journalist Sandy English writing that "much of the Squires [sic.] Collection of Chinese art, now in the Metropolitan Museum in New York, was stolen from Beijing in the aftermath of the revolt".

==== Response by Favier ====
In February 1901 Favier immediately denied all accusations of looting or ordering any of his followers to loot, promised to return to Beijing soon and there report to the authorities and answer the accusations, and make full reparation if "it be shown that any Christian without his knowledge or order injured any Chinese family." Favier indicated "if any injustice has been done, in spite of my order to the contrary, I will see that it is repaired."

Favier departed for China in February 1901, and upon his return to Beijing at the end of March, could not find any outstanding accusations against him. On 1 April 1900 Favier cabled a strong denial: "Bishop Favier denies utterly the accounts published in Europe and America, to the effect that he conducted an immense loot sale. Favier's defence was similar to that of William Scott Ament, the American Board of Commissioners for Foreign Missions missionary to Beijing, who was attacked in print by American humorist Mark Twain, in that goods seized were to feed and support indigent Christian survivors.

On 20 October 1901, Favier wrote a lengthy response to the accusations, which was subsequently published in The New York Times on 1 December 1901, as well as in the December edition of The Independent, the Paulist Fathers' Catholic World, and reprinted in The American Monthly Review of Reviews edited by American academic, journalist, and reformer Albert Shaw (1857–1947). Favier indicated in his apologia that on 16 August 1900 there were about six thousand Christian survivors of the Peking siege, and that after sixty days were "now without either shelter, clothing or food." As he was unwilling to

"permit the multitude to die of hunger. It was then that I authorized my steward (ministre) to keep an exact account of all the food that should be taken from the Government stores in order that it might be deducted from the indemnity to be asked for later on. A similar account must be carefully made of all things taken from the residences and stores of private citizens. This he did. The value of things taken from the Government stores was deducted from the amount required as indemnity, and the owners of the residences and stores were all reimbursed."

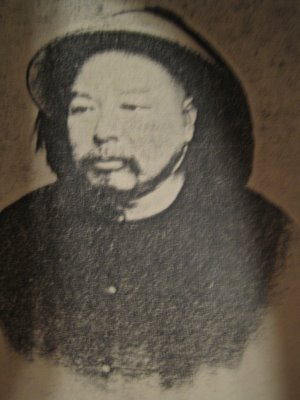
Yuan Chang (1846-1900)

Favier indicated that he could not locate anyone named Lu-Sen, but believed it was Yuan Chang (here romanized as Yan Li Chan), who "had a fairly good residence near my own. He was condemned to death, and executed by Prince Tuan. His house was pillaged by the Boxers, who also burned it in order to make their escape." Favier claimed Christians were able to save four cases of porcelain from the home of Yan Li Chan, and stored in Favier's home. These cases, plus his own valuable personal collection, was sold to provide for the 18,000 to 20,000 Christians in the province who were starving. According to Favier, believing Yan had no surviving descendants, he decided to sell to Squiers pieces from both his and Yan's collections for a total of £1,000, which Favier indicated was distributed immediately to the needy. Upon locating a son of Yuan Chang, Favier indicated that he compelled him to take full remuneration for the items sold. Favier concluded that he was held in such esteem as a result of his efforts that he had received numerous testimonials and addresses of thanks from grateful pagans, and that a great number of them had converted to Christianity, with 1,400 baptised and over four thousand enrolled to become Catholics.

Favier concluded:

Now I have written exactly what happened. If any man does not wish to take the word of an old man and a Bishop, who has lived for forty years in Peking, I can obtain and send the affidavits of all those who have suffered loss and been indemnified....We have never had the least trouble with the good people of Peking, who know well that I am the friend of the pagan just as well as of the Christian.

=== Subsequent evaluation ===
In an obituary published in The New York Times on 5 April 1905, the looting charges made against him four years earlier were rehearsed, but The New York Times concluded:

It turned out that the charges were baseless, and that, as a matter of fact, the Bishop had sold his own valuable collection of porcelains to keep the Chinese Christians from starving.

However, this did not prevent the Vietnamese Communist revolutionary Hồ Chí Minh, then an instructor at the Whampoa Military Academy in Canton using the same material to criticise Favier in his 1925 article, "Le Procès de la Colonisation Française", for his "pillaging" of property.

== See also ==
- Norwegian: Pierre-Marie-Alphonse Favier

== Works ==
=== Articles ===
- "An Answer to Charges of Looting" Catholic World 74 (October 1901 – March 1902):387ff, 390.

=== Books ===
- The Heart of Pekin: Bishop A. Favier's Diary of the Siege, May–August 1900. Ed. Joseph Freri. Boston: Marlier, 1901. https://archive.org/stream/heartpekinbisho00frgoog/heartpekinbisho00frgoog_djvu.txt. Retrieved 8 January 2009.
- Peking, histoire et description. Peking: Impr. Lazaristes, 1897. reed. 1898; Lille: Societe de Saint Augustin, 1900; Lille: Desclee de Brouwer, 1902. https://archive.org/details/pkinghistoiree00faviuoft https://archive.org/download/pkinghistoiree00faviuoft/pkinghistoiree00faviuoft.pdf
- Siège de la mission catholique du Pé-tang. Annales CM LXVI (66) (1901):55–124. https://web.archive.org/web/20081205015826/http://www.famvin.org/fr/missions/FAVIER/FAVIER_siegePetang.htm
- Yanjing kaijiao lue [Brief Account of the Founding of the Church in Yanjing], Beijing: Pan Guoliang of the Beijing Vincentians, 1905.

=== Letters ===
- Lettres d' Alphonse Favier (Prêtre de la Mission de St Lazare) a sa famille-depuis son depart pour la Chine, v.1. [uns., und].
- Letter to Mr. ______, a member of the central Committee of the Society of the Holy Childhood, 1 October 1864, from Pekin [Beijing], China. Pages 32–33 in Annals of the Society of the Holy Childhood for the Redemption of Pagan Children. Vol. VII. Trans. from the French. London: Thomas Richardson & Son, 1866.. Retrieved 10 January 2009.
- Letter to Mr. ______, a member of the central Committee of the Society of the Holy Childhood, 25 January 1866, from Pekin [Beijing], China. Pages 164–167 in Annals of the Society of the Holy Childhood for the Redemption of Pagan Children. Vol. VII. Trans. from the French. London: Thomas Richardson & Son, 1866.. Retrieved 10 January 2009.

== Further reading and sources ==
=== Articles and chapters ===
- Barend J. ter Haar. "Westerners as Scapegoats", pp. 154–201. Chapter 4 in Telling Stories: Witchcraft and Scapegoating in Chinese History. Leiden: Brill, 2006.
- Barry, Peter. "An International Conference on the Boxer Movement and Christianity in China: A Report". Tripod 24:134 (Autumn 2004). Retrieved 8 January 2009.
- Doyle, A.P. "The Crisis in China and the Missions" Catholic World 71:424 (July 1900):548–554;. Retrieved 13 January 2009.
- Fairbank, John King. "Patterns Behind the Tientsin Massacre." Harvard Journal of Asiatic Studies 20:3/4 (1957):480–511.
- Hevia, James L. "Leaving a Brand on China: Missionary Discourse in the Wake of the Boxer Movement", Modern China 18:3 (July 1992).
- Hevia, James L. "Looting Beijing, 1860, 1900", 192–213, in Tokens of Exchange: The Problem of Translation in Global Circulations. Edited by Lydia He Liu. Duke University Press, 1999.
- Hevia, James L. "Loot's Fate: The Economy of Plunder and the Moral Life of Objects from the Summer Palace of the Emperor of China." History and Anthropology 6:4 (1994):319–345.
- Holmes, C.J. "Archaic Chinese Bronzes". The Burlington Magazine for Connoisseurs 7:25 (April 1905):19–31.
- Lynch, George."Vae Victis!", Independent 52 (1901):2681–2683.
- Morrison, Dr. [George Ernest]. "The Siege of the Peking Legations". Part 1. In The Living Age: A Weekly Magazine of Contemporary Literature and Thought 227:2941 (17 November 1900):400–415; Reprint from The Times despatch dated 14 August 1900 from Peking). Retrieved 13 January 2009.
- Morra, Luciano, S.J. "Developments in Relations Among the Vatican, China and the Catholic Church in 19th Century China." Paper presented at International Conference on the Boxer Movement and Christianity in China, Taiwan, 10–11 June 2004.
- Park, Nancy. "Imperial Chinese Justice and the Law of Torture" Late Imperial China [The Johns Hopkins University Press] 29:2 (December 2008):37–67. E-ISSN 1086-3257 Print ISSN 0884-3236 Favier justifies torture of Chinese on physiological grounds.
- The Pilgrim of Our Lady of Martyrs 17 (1901): 20ff., 60, 368ff. N.Y. Catholic Protectory for St. Joseph's Church, Troy, N.Y.
- Schier, A. "Alphonse Favier et la protection des missions en Chine (1870-1905)", Neue Zeitschrift für Missionswissenschaft (NZM)25 (1969): 1–13, 90–101.
- Schier, A. "La nonciature pour Pekin en 1886", NZM 24 (1968):1-14, 94–110.
- Waldersee, Count Alfred. "Plundering Peking". Preussische Jahrbücher [Berlin Conservative Nationalist Historical Monthly](March); reprinted in The Living Age 317:4118 (9 June 1923): 563–569.. Retrieved 11 January 2009.
- Witek, John W, "Pierre-Marie Alphone Favier." Biographical Dictionary of Chinese Christianity.. Retrieved 9 January 2009.

=== Books ===
- Birch, John Grant. Travels in North and Central China. Davidson (R.J.) and Isaac Mason, 1902. Reprint ed. Adamant Media, 2001.. Retrieved 9 January 2009.
- Brandt, Joseph van den. Lazaristes en Chine (1697–1935). Pei-P'ing: Imprimerie des Lazaristes, 1936.
- Cohen, Paul A. China and Christianity: The Missionary Movement and the Growth of Chinese Anti-Foreignism, 1860-1870. Cambridge, Massachusetts: Harvard University Press, 1963.
- Devine, W. The Four Churches of Peking. Burns, Oates & Washbourne, 1930.
- Elleman, Bruce A. Modern Chinese Warfare, 1795-1989. Routledge, 2001. See pages 126ff for Siege of the North Cathedral & Favier's role.
- Giles, Lancelot. The Siege of the Peking Legations: A Diary. Includes "Chinese Anti-Foreignism and the Boxer Uptrising" by Leslie Ronald Marchant. University of Western Australia Press, 1970.
- Hayter-Menzies, Grant. Imperial Masquerade: The Legend of Princess Der Ling. Hong Kong University Press, 2008. Pages 89ff.
- Hoe, Susanna. Women at the Siege: Peking 1900. Oxford: The Women's History Press, 2000.
- Lynch, George. The War of the Civilizations, Being the Record of A "Foreign Devil's" Experiences with the Allies in China. London: Longmans, Greens, and Co., 1901.
- Preston, Diana. Besieged in Peking: The Story of the 1900 Boxer Rising. Constable, 1999. Page 69.
- Preston, Diana. The Boxer Rebellion: The Dramatic Story of China's War on Foreigners that Shook the World in the Summer of 1900. Walker, 2000; See page 395. Berkley Books, 2001. See page 291 for a description of missionary "looting".
- Sharf, Frederic A., and Peter Harrington. China, 1900: The Eyewitnesses Speak. London: Greenhill, Books, 2000.
- Streit, Robert, ed., Annales de la Congrégation de la Mission 70 (1905):339-350.
- Thomas, Antoine. Histoire de la Mission de Pékin. Vol. 2: Depuis l'arrivée des Lazaristes jusqu'à la révolte des Boxeurs, 1933.
- Weale, B.L Putnam. Indiscreet Letters from Peking: Being the Notes of an Eye-Witness, Which Set Forth in Some Detail, from Day to Day, the Real Story of the Siege and Sack of a Distressed Capital in 1900—the Year of Great Tribulation. New York: Dodd, Mead and Company, 1908. Page 326ff.
- Whiting, Jasper. The Journal of Jasper Whiting. Boston: Napoleon Tennyson Hobbes, Junior, 1902.
- Xiang, Lanxin. The Origins of the Boxer War: A Multinational Study. Routledge, 2003. Discusses Favier & Pichon.

=== Dissertations and theses ===
- Au, Simon. "War Crimes of Circumstance and Convenience", Bachelor of Arts thesis, College of Social Studies, Wesleyan University, Middletown, Connecticut, April 2007.. Retrieved 11 January 2009
