= Canton of Chenôve =

Coordinates: 47.29°N 5.00°E

The canton of Chenôve is an administrative division of the Côte-d'Or department, eastern France. Its borders were modified at the French canton reorganisation which came into effect in March 2015. Its seat is in Chenôve.

It consists of the following communes:

1. Chenôve
2. Marsannay-la-Côte
