= Couchey =

- Commune
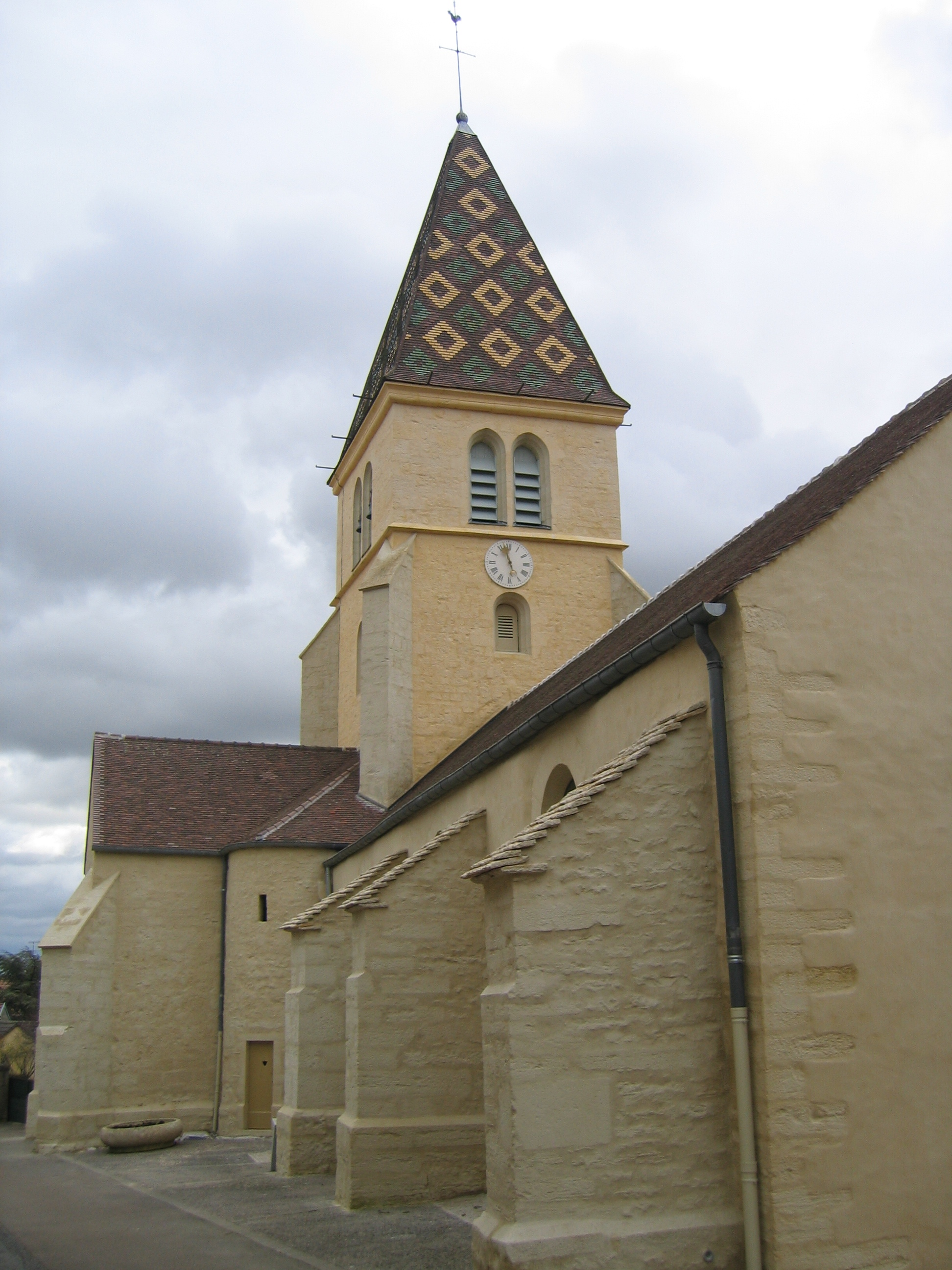
- The church in Couchey

- Coat of arms
- Location of Couchey
- Location within France Location within Bourgogne-Franche-Comté
- Coordinates: 47°15′41″N 4°58′56″E
- Country: France
- Region: Bourgogne-Franche-Comté
- Department: Côte-d'Or
- Arrondissement: Beaune
- Canton: Longvic

Government
  - Mayor (2020–2026): Gilles Carré
- Area^{1}: 12.7 km^{2} (4.9 sq mi)
- Highest elevation: 560 m (1,840 ft)
- Lowest elevation: 229 m (751 ft)
- Population (2023): 1,103
  - Density: 86.9/km^{2} (225/sq mi)
- Time zone: UTC+01:00 (CET)
  - Summer (DST): UTC+02:00 (CEST)
- INSEE/Postal code: 21200 /21160
- ^{1} French Land Register data, which excludes lakes, ponds, glaciers > 1 km^{2} (0.386 sq mi or 247 acres) and river estuaries.

Couchey (French pronunciation: [kuʃɛ]) is a commune in the Côte-d'Or department and region of Bourgogne-Franche-Comté in eastern France.

== Population ==
Historical population
Year	Pop.	±% p.a.
1968	974	—
1975	1,255	+3.69%
1982	1,135	−1.43%
1990	1,267	+1.38%
1999	1,187	−0.72%
2007	1,190	+0.03%
2012	1,178	−0.20%
2017	1,130	−0.83%
2023	1,103	−0.40%
Source: INSEE

== Wine ==
The vineyards of Couchey are part of the appellation d'origine contrôlée (AOC) Marsannay.

== See also ==
- Communes of the Côte-d'Or department
