= Marsannay-la-Côte =

- Commune
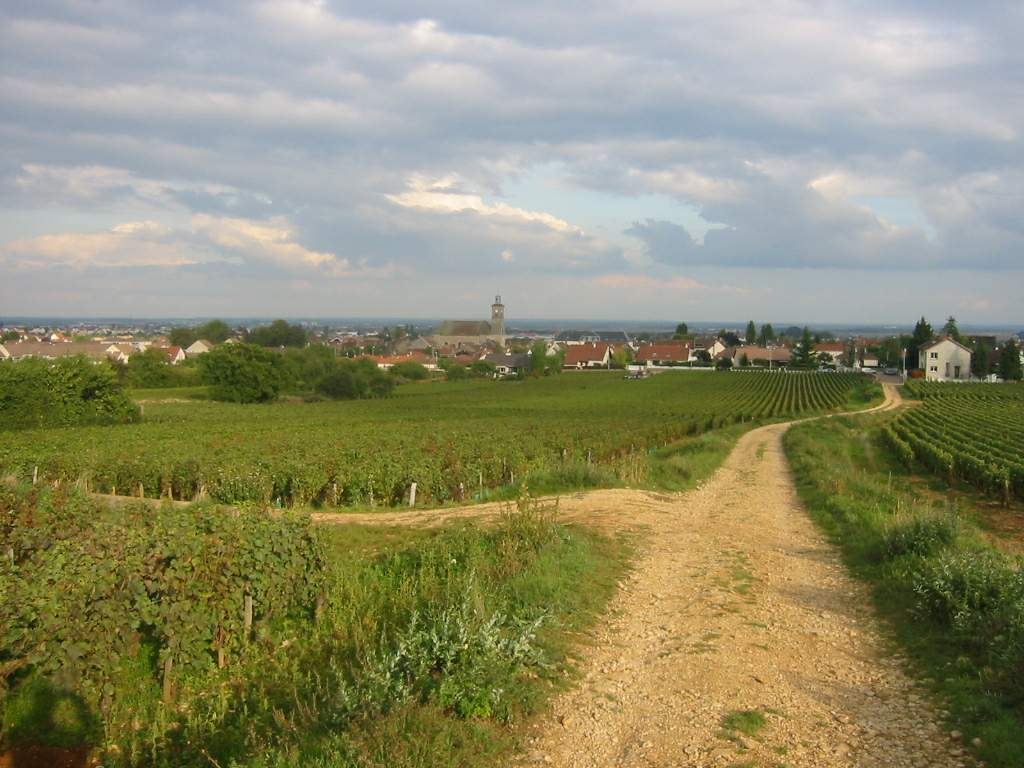
- A general view of Marsannay-la-Côte

- Coat of arms
- Location of Marsannay-la-Côte
- Location within France Location within Bourgogne-Franche-Comté
- Coordinates: 47°16′17″N 4°59′22″E
- Country: France
- Region: Bourgogne-Franche-Comté
- Department: Côte-d'Or
- Arrondissement: Dijon
- Canton: Chenôve
- Intercommunality: Dijon Métropole

Government
  - Mayor (2020–2026): Jean-Michel Verpillot
- Area^{1}: 12.85 km^{2} (4.96 sq mi)
- Elevation: 275 m (902 ft)
- Highest elevation: 477 m (1,565 ft)
- Lowest elevation: 238 m (781 ft)
- Population (2023): 5,433
  - Density: 422.8/km^{2} (1,095/sq mi)
- Time zone: UTC+01:00 (CET)
  - Summer (DST): UTC+02:00 (CEST)
- INSEE/Postal code: 21390 /21160
- ^{1} French Land Register data, which excludes lakes, ponds, glaciers > 1 km^{2} (0.386 sq mi or 247 acres) and river estuaries.

Marsannay-la-Côte (French pronunciation: [maʁsanɛ la kot]) is a commune in the Côte-d'Or department in the Bourgogne-Franche-Comté region in eastern France.

== Geography ==
Marsannay-la-Côte contains a strip of vineyards on the slope of the Côte d'Or. The vineyards are the most northerly part of the Burgundy wine region. In the plain of the Saône to the east, large fields are visible. The original village is now flanked by small modern housing developments. There is 186ha of vineyards, 202ha of agricultural land and 523ha of communal woodland on the Jurassic limestone hills to the West.

The village is situated 6 km South-West of Dijon and is on the Route des Grands Crus (which loosely translates as the "road of great vineyards") that traverses the Burgundy wine region.

=== Climate ===
Marsannay-la-Côte has an oceanic climate (Köppen climate classification Cfb). The average annual temperature in Marsannay-la-Côte is 11.2 °C (52.2 °F). The average annual rainfall is 800.8 mm (31.53 in) with May as the wettest month. The temperatures are highest on average in July, at around 20.7 °C (69.3 °F), and lowest in January, at around 2.2 °C (36.0 °F). The highest temperature ever recorded in Marsannay-la-Côte was 40.0 °C (104.0 °F) on 12 August 2003; the coldest temperature ever recorded was −19.5 °C (−3.1 °F) on 9 January 1985.

Climate data for Marsannay-la-Côte (1981–2010 averages, extremes 1938−2021)
Month	Jan	Feb	Mar	Apr	May	Jun	Jul	Aug	Sep	Oct	Nov	Dec	Year
Record high °C (°F)	16.0 (60.8)	21.5 (70.7)	25.3 (77.5)	28.5 (83.3)	32.0 (89.6)	39.5 (103.1)	40.0 (104.0)	40.0 (104.0)	34.0 (93.2)	27.5 (81.5)	21.6 (70.9)	17.5 (63.5)	40.0 (104.0)
Mean daily maximum °C (°F)	5.0 (41.0)	7.0 (44.6)	11.8 (53.2)	15.4 (59.7)	19.8 (67.6)	23.6 (74.5)	26.4 (79.5)	25.9 (78.6)	21.3 (70.3)	15.7 (60.3)	9.1 (48.4)	5.6 (42.1)	15.6 (60.1)
Daily mean °C (°F)	2.2 (36.0)	3.4 (38.1)	7.2 (45.0)	10.4 (50.7)	14.7 (58.5)	18.2 (64.8)	20.7 (69.3)	20.2 (68.4)	16.2 (61.2)	11.6 (52.9)	5.9 (42.6)	3.0 (37.4)	11.2 (52.2)
Mean daily minimum °C (°F)	−0.7 (30.7)	−0.2 (31.6)	2.7 (36.9)	5.4 (41.7)	9.6 (49.3)	12.8 (55.0)	15.0 (59.0)	14.5 (58.1)	11.0 (51.8)	7.4 (45.3)	2.7 (36.9)	0.3 (32.5)	6.7 (44.1)
Record low °C (°F)	−19.5 (−3.1)	−14.0 (6.8)	−11.5 (11.3)	−4.5 (23.9)	−2.0 (28.4)	4.0 (39.2)	6.0 (42.8)	5.5 (41.9)	1.5 (34.7)	−4.5 (23.9)	−10.5 (13.1)	−16.0 (3.2)	−19.5 (−3.1)
Average precipitation mm (inches)	65.7 (2.59)	54.4 (2.14)	53.8 (2.12)	59.3 (2.33)	83.0 (3.27)	72.1 (2.84)	63.8 (2.51)	60.2 (2.37)	68.5 (2.70)	71.5 (2.81)	77.2 (3.04)	71.3 (2.81)	800.8 (31.53)
Average precipitation days (≥ 1.0 mm)	11.6	9.4	10.1	9.9	11.0	8.6	7.6	8.2	8.3	10.4	11.4	11.9	118.3
Source: Meteociel

== Population ==
Historical population

Year	Pop.	±% p.a.
1793	617	—
1800	584	−0.78%
1806	591	+0.20%
1821	619	+0.31%
1831	703	+1.28%
1836	730	+0.76%
1841	761	+0.84%
1846	832	+1.80%
1851	788	−1.08%
1856	783	−0.13%
1861	840	+1.42%
1866	837	−0.07%
1872	825	−0.24%
1876	819	−0.18%
1881	855	+0.86%
1886	892	+0.85%
1891	875	−0.38%
1896	813	−1.46%
1901	808	−0.12%

Year	Pop.	±% p.a.
1906	769	−0.98%
1911	743	−0.69%
1921	757	+0.19%
1926	793	+0.93%
1931	895	+2.45%
1936	914	+0.42%
1946	978	+0.68%
1954	1,124	+1.75%
1962	1,872	+6.58%
1968	4,060	+13.77%
1975	6,588	+7.16%
1982	5,941	−1.47%
1990	5,216	−1.61%
1999	5,211	−0.01%
2007	5,158	−0.13%
2012	5,192	+0.13%
2017	5,348	+0.59%
2023	5,433	+0.26%

Source: EHESS and INSEE (1968–2023)

== Administration ==
List of mayors
Period	Name
1983–2008	Gérard Laborier
2008–2014	Jean-Francois Gondellier
2014–current	Jean-Michel Verpillot

== Wine ==
Marsannay-la-Côte vineyards, which form part of Côte de Nuits, produce wine of all three colours - red (Pinot Noir), white (Chardonnay) and rosé (Pinot Noir) - which is unique for a communal appellation in the Burgundy wine region. The commune's appellation d'origine contrôlée (AOC) is called Marsannay, without la-Côte.

== Twin towns – sister cities ==
Marsannay-la-Côte is twinned with:

- Mazy, Belgium (1958)
- Schweich, Germany (1992)

== See also ==
- Communes of the Côte-d'Or département
- Cécile Bart (born 1958), artist based in Marsannay-la-Côte
- Pierre-Marie-Alphonse Favier (1837–1905), born in Marsannay-la-Côte
