= Chenôve =

- Commune
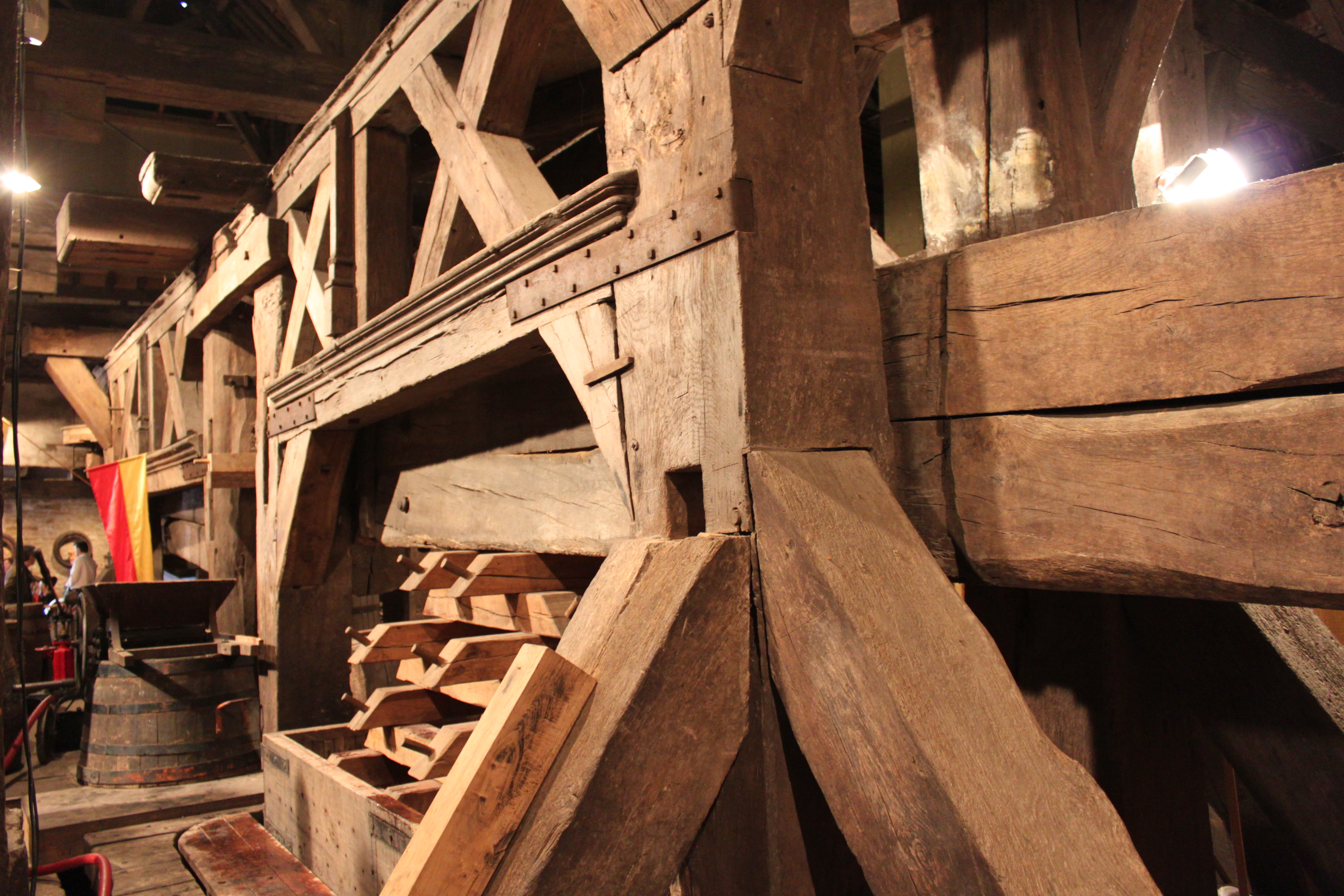
- Winepress of the Dukes of Burgundy

- Coat of arms
- Location of Chenôve
- Location within France Location within Bourgogne-Franche-Comté
- Coordinates: 47°17′30″N 5°00′29″E
- Country: France
- Region: Bourgogne-Franche-Comté
- Department: Côte-d'Or
- Arrondissement: Dijon
- Canton: Chenôve
- Intercommunality: Dijon Métropole

Government
  - Mayor (2020–2026): Thierry Falconnet
- Area^{1}: 7.42 km^{2} (2.86 sq mi)
- Highest elevation: 392 m (1,286 ft)
- Lowest elevation: 238 m (781 ft)
- Population (2023): 14,244
  - Density: 1,920/km^{2} (4,970/sq mi)
- Time zone: UTC+01:00 (CET)
  - Summer (DST): UTC+02:00 (CEST)
- INSEE/Postal code: 21166 /21300
- ^{1} French Land Register data, which excludes lakes, ponds, glaciers > 1 km^{2} (0.386 sq mi or 247 acres) and river estuaries.

Chenôve (French pronunciation: [ʃənov]) is a commune in the Côte-d'Or department in the Bourgogne-Franche-Comté region of France.

Until 1955, it was a small-scale winegrowing village, when it was absorbed into the urban agglomeration of Dijon. It is now the most populous suburb of the city of Dijon, located adjacent to the city's southwest side.

With about 14,000 inhabitants, Chenôve is the third largest urban area in the Côte-d'Or and the second largest economy in Dijon. Local Cheneveliers (residents of Chenôve) call themselves the "bombis", which is patois for "good bread".

== Geography ==
To the west of Chenôve, above the old town, is the Plateau of Chenôve, which reaches an altitude of 387 m. It has views of the city, its surroundings, and the distant plains of the Saône and Jura. In good weather it allows views of the contours of Mont Blanc. The plateau extends over 240 hectares with a great landscape diversity – alternating valleys, forests of Austrian pines, oak, ash, shrubland, and vast flat plains peppered with groves. It has rich Mediterranean flora.

In addition, there are the ancient limestone quarries in Chenôve, from which many of the monuments in Dijon were built.

== Population ==
Historical population

Year	Pop.	±% p.a.
1793	612	—
1800	665	+1.19%
1806	632	−0.84%
1821	684	+0.53%
1831	771	+1.20%
1836	767	−0.10%
1841	793	+0.67%
1846	784	−0.23%
1851	759	−0.65%
1856	786	+0.70%
1861	778	−0.20%
1866	819	+1.03%
1872	745	−1.57%
1876	739	−0.20%
1881	721	−0.49%
1886	776	+1.48%
1891	812	+0.91%
1896	780	−0.80%
1901	800	+0.51%

Year	Pop.	±% p.a.
1906	781	−0.48%
1911	818	+0.93%
1921	870	+0.62%
1926	1,100	+4.80%
1931	1,726	+9.43%
1936	2,504	+7.73%
1946	2,763	+0.99%
1954	3,829	+4.16%
1962	5,517	+4.67%
1968	17,155	+20.81%
1975	21,448	+3.24%
1982	19,389	−1.43%
1990	17,721	−1.12%
1999	16,257	−0.95%
2007	14,841	−1.13%
2012	13,959	−1.22%
2017	13,910	−0.07%
2023	14,244	+0.40%

Source: EHESS and INSEE (1968-2023)

=== Criminality ===
In 2025, at the Pierre Semard place, a man is killed. Few days earlier, another is shot, in a suburb of Dijon, in addition of another ones admitted to hospital.

== Administration ==
List of Mayors (since 1978)

1. Roland Carraz, Socialist Party, March 1978 - March 1995
2. Roland Carraz, Citizen and Republican Movement, March 1995 - December 1999 (died in office)
3. Jean Esmonin, Socialist Party, December 1999 – present

== Wine ==
The vineyards of Chenôve are part of the appellation d'origine contrôlée (AOC) Marsannay.

== Notable people ==
- Mark Karpelès, CEO of Mt. Gox

== See also ==
- Communes of the Côte-d'Or department
