= Arthur Judson Brown =

American missionary

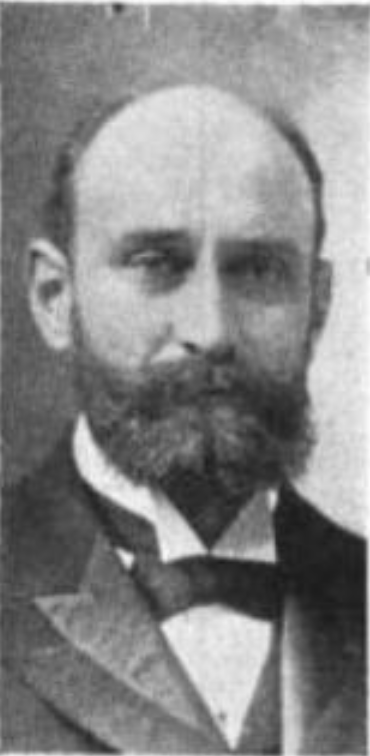
Brown in 1906

Arthur Judson Brown (December 3, 1856 – January 11, 1963) was an American clergyman, missionary and author.

Brown was born in Holliston, Massachusetts, and was ordained as a Presbyterian minister in 1883. Brown preached in various cities throughout the United States, including Portland, Oregon and Oak Park, Illinois from 1883 to 1895.

Often termed a "missionary statesman," Brown traveled throughout the world—most notably in China and other Asian countries. During the time Brown surveyed China, he wrote a seventeen-volume diary of what he'd seen and discovered. Over time, Brown communicated with Roman Catholic, Jewish, and Greek Orthodox leaders, in addition to such influential Protestant clergymen as Henry Sloane Coffin, Nathan Söderblom, and John R. Mott. Brown himself received letters from five American Presidents and various other government officials. Booker T. Washington, John D. Rockefeller Jr. (1839–1937), and John Wanamaker were among his famous American correspondents. In addition, members of European and Asian royalty, including Chinese general and self-proclaimed emperor, Yuan Shikai, were in communication with Brown.

Overall, Brown will be remembered as a pioneer in the ecumenical and world missionary movements of the 19th and 20th centuries and was an individual who was active in and out of the church. He served in a plethora of notable positions. The following is a lengthy chronology of Brown's achievements and activities. During this time Brown also preached at various churches.

Arthur Judson Brown died in New York City in 1963, 39 days after celebrating his 106th birthday. He was subsequently buried in Orange, New Jersey.

== Career chronology ==
- 1887: Moderator of the Synod of Chicago.
- 1890: Chairman of the Portland City Board of Charities; drafts law organizing Oregon's first State Board of Charities and Corrections
- 1895–1929: serves as Administrative Secretary, later General Secretary of the Presbyterian Board of Foreign Missions.
- 1896: first attends the Foreign Mission Conference of North America; later becomes first Chairman of the Committee of Reference and Counsel (16 years), and Chairman of the Emergency Committee on Support of Missionary Societies.
- 1898–1900: Ecumenical Missionary Conference, New York—member Executive Committee; Chairman—Hospitality Committee.
- 1901–1902: world trip to Asian missions.
- 1909: made world trip.
- 1910: World Missionary Conference, Edinburgh, Scotland—member Executive Committee; Chairman, American Section; member of Continuation Committee for 16 years.
- 1910: Commission of the Federal Council of Churches on Relief for Protestant Churches in France and Belgium-Chairman; resumes following World War I.
- 1913: awarded D.D., Yale University.
- 1913–1963: Council on Religion and International Affairs (formerly The Church Peace Union)--Charter Trustee; member Executive and Finance Committees; treasurer since 1936.
- 1914: British and Foreign Bible Society—Honorary Foreign Member.1914: World Alliance for Promoting International Friendship Through Religion-member Executive Committee.
- 1914–1937: Peking Union Medical College, China—trustee; member Executive Committee; post 1937—member Advisory Committee.
- 1915: Near East Relief-trustee.
- 1915–1918: Moral Aims of World War I—member Executive Committee.
- 1915–1919: National Committee on Relief of Children in Belgium—member Organizing and Executive Committees.
- 1915–1963: Hall of Fame for Great Americans—elector.
- 1917: Foreign Missions Conference of North America-Chairman. League of Nations Non-Partisan Association—Honorary Vice-President.
- 1918–1940: Hungary-American Society—Chairman of Executive Committee, Vice President; 1920– Chairman of Deputation to Hungary.
- 1919: Committee on Relief for Protestant Churches in Devastated Regions in Europe in World War I.
- 1920–1937: American Committee on Religious Rights and Minorities—Chairman; 1937-Honorary Chairman.
- 1920: Life and Work Movement—member of delegation sent by Federal Council of Churches of U.S. for its delegation 1920: Greek Decoration—Officer of the Royal Order of George I. Emergency Committee for Relief of Refugees in Greece—Chairman.
- 1921: International Missionary Council—organizer.
- 1921: Siamese Decoration—Commander of the Most Exalted Order of the White Elephant.
- 1924: National Committee on American-Japanese Relations—member.
- 1925: Conference of Reformed Churches holding the Presbyterian System, Cardiff, Wales—Committee member and speaker.
- 1925: Universal Christian Conference on Life and Work, Stockholm, Sweden-Joint President; Chairman-American Section; helps establish "Life and Work". headquarters at Geneva in 1928; Chairman-Continuation Committee until 1936.
- 1927: World Conference on Faith and Order, Lausanne, Switzerland—delegate; American-Palestine Committee—member.
- 1930: editor the Missionary Review of the World for one year.
- 1931: Save the Children Federation—first President; 1931-1936-Honorary President; member Executive Committee.
- 1933–1937: International World Alliance of Presbyterian and Reformed Churches-Vice-President: President-American Section.
- 1937: Eugene Field Society (National Literary Association)-honorary membership
- 1960: Hall of Fame for Great Americans—citation.

As noted, Brown was appointed as a life elector for the Hall of Fame for Great Americans, serving from 1915–1963, a period of 48 years.

== Writings ==
Brown is also remembered for his career as an author. In his 106 years of life, he authored numerous books. The following is a listing of Brown's works.

- Report of a Visitation of the China Missions (1902)
- The New Era in the Philippines (1903)
- New Forces in Old China, 7volumes (1904)
- The Foreign Missionary (1907
- The Nearer and Farther East (1908)
- The Why and How of Foreign Missions (1908)
- The Chinese Revolution (1912)
- The Korean conspiracy case (1912)
- Rising Churches in Non-Christian Lands (1915)
- Unity and Missions (1915)
- Russia in Transformation (1917)
- The Mastery of the Far East (1919) modern reprint
- The Expectation of Siam (1925)
- Japan in the World of Today (1928)
- One Hundred Years (1936)
- Memoirs of a Centenarian (1957)

== See also ==
- 19th-century Protestant missions in China
- List of Protestant missionaries in China
- Christianity in China
