= Señorío de Sanlúcar =

Independent Christian lordship

Coordinates: 40°24′30″N 1°26′22″W

Señorío de Sanlúcar Lordship of Sanlúcar Señorío de Sanlúcar (Spanish) Sanlucarreko Jaurerria (Basque)
- 1297–1645
- Coat of arms
- Common languages: Latin, Spanish, Arabic
- Religion: Catholic Church; Islam
- Government: Independent Lordship, Lordship Associated with Dukedom of Medina Sidonia
- King House of Guzmán House of Medina Sidonia
  - 1297: Alfonso Pérez de Guzmán el Bueno
  - 1309: Juan Alonso Pérez de Guzmán y Coronel
- Historical era: Middle Ages, Early Modern
  - Established: 1297
  - Disestablished: 1645
Preceded by	Succeeded by
Emirate of Granada	Kingdom of Castile
- Today part of: Sanlúcar de Barrameda, Spain

The Señorío de Sanlúcar or Lordship of Sanlúcar was an independent Christian lordship in the Kingdom of Castile located in and around the modern day city of Sanlúcar de Barrameda. It was taken from the Kingdom of Granada in 1295.

== History ==
=== Establishment ===
The Señorío de Sanlúcar was a Spanish Lordship located in the Kingdom of Seville which in turn belonged at the time of its formation to the Kingdom of Castile. The Señorío was created by order of King Sancho IV of Castile on 4 April 1295 and granted to Alfonso Pérez de Guzmán el Bueno for services rendered to the Castilian crown, specifically, his heroic defence of Tarifa during the Spanish Reconquista. Although Sancho IV died before handing over control officially to Guzmán el Bueno, his son, Ferdinand IV of Castile confirmed the handover to Guzmán as follows La Villa de Sanlúcar con todos sus pobladores, términos y pertenencias, y los pechos y derechos que allí tenía y deber había (En: The Lordship of the town of Sanlúcar with all its people, income and belongings and the rights which this land held and should hold). The handover was signed at Toro on 13 October 1297 and the original documents are archived at the Archive of the House of Medina Sidonia. Alfonso Pérez de Guzmán el Bueno and his descendants used the denomination Señor de Sanlúcar as the first and most prestigious of their noble titles.

=== Early years ===
In its inception, the Señorío de Sanlúcar included the town of Sanlúcar which is today the city of Sanlúcar de Barrameda and its surrounding lands which included the Port of Barrameda, Trebujena, Chipiona and Rota. These four supplementary towns which originally formed the Señorío de Sanlúcar were separated from the Señorío as part of the dowry of Isabel Pérez de Guzmán, one of the daughters of Alfonso Pérez de Guzmán el Bueno who went on to marry Fernán Ponce de Léon. Thereafter, these towns were incorporated into the collective holdings of the House of Ponce de León a branch of the House of Arcos.

=== Control to the House of Medina Sidonia ===
Trebujena was made into an independent town chartae populationis on 21 April 1494 by order of Juan Alonso Pérez de Guzmán y de Ribera, the III Duke of Medina Sidonia.

The Señorío de Sanlúcar was the power base of the House of Medina Sidonia until 1645 when Sanlúcar de Barrameda was incorporated into the Spanish crown. This occurred in the aftermath of the Andalusian independentist conspiracy, an effort by the House of Medina Sidonia to consolidate power at the expense of the Spanish crown. As a result, much of their holdings were confiscated by the crown. Today, the Costa Noroeste de Cádiz roughly encapsulates the former extent of the original Señorío de Sanlúcar.

=== The Señors de Sanlúcar ===
Señor de Sanlúcar	Period	Notes
--
Alfonso Pérez de Guzmán el Bueno	1297 - 1309	I Señor de Sanlúcar
Juan Alonso Pérez de Guzmán y Coronel	1309 - 1351	II Señor de Sanlúcar
Alonso Pérez de Guzmán y Osorio	1351 - 30 May 1365	III Señor de Sanlúcar
Juan Alonso Pérez de Guzmán y Osorio	1365 - 5 October 1396	IV Señor de Sanlúcar
Enrique Pérez de Guzmán y Castilla	1396 - 31 October 1436	V Señor de Sanlúcar
Juan Alonso de Guzmán y Suárez de Figueroa Orozco	1436 - December 1468	VI Señor de Sanlúcar, I Duke of Medina Sidonia
Enrique Pérez de Guzmán y Fonseca	1468 - 1492	VII Señor de Sanlúcar, II Duke of Medina Sidonia, I Marqués de Gibraltar
Juan Alonso Pérez de Guzmán y de Ribera	1492 - 1507	VIII Señor de Sanlúcar, III Duke of Medina Sidonia, I Marqués de Cazaza
Enrique Pérez de Guzmán y Fernández de Velasco	1507 - 1512	IX Señor de Sanlúcar, IV Duke of Medina Sidonia
Alonso Pérez de Guzmán y Pérez de Guzmán (Aragonese)	1512 - 1518	X Señor de Sanlúcar, V Duke of Medina Sidonia
Juan Alonso Pérez de Guzmán y Pérez de Guzmán	1518 - 26 November 1558	XI Señor de Sanlúcar, VI Duke of Medina Sidonia
Alonso Pérez de Guzmán y Sotomayor	1558 - 26 July 1615	XII Señor de Sanlúcar, VII Duke of Medina Sidonia
Manuel Alonso Pérez de Guzmán y Gómez de Silva	1615 - 1636	XIII Señor de Sanlúcar, VII Duke of Medina Sidonia
Gaspar Pérez de Guzmán y Gómez de Sandoval y Rojas	1636 - 1645	XIV Señor de Sanlúcar, IX Duke of Medina Sidonia
Philip IV of Spain	1645 - December 1665	Title taken by Monarchy - King of Spain
Charles II of Spain	1665 - 1700	King of Spain
Philip V of Spain	1700 - 1724	King of Spain
Louis I of Spain	1724 - 1724	King of Spain
Philip V of Spain	1724 - 1746	King of Spain
Ferdinand VI of Spain	1746 - 1759	King of Spain
Charles III of Spain	1759 - 1788	King of Spain
Charles IV of Spain	1788 - 1808	King of Spain
Ferdinand VII of Spain and Joseph Bonaparte	1808 - 1833; 1808 - 1814	King of Spain
Isabella II of Spain	1833 - 1868	Queen of Spain Deposed
Amadeo I of Spain	1870 - 1873	King of Spain
Alfonso XII of Spain	1874 - 1885	King of Spain
Alfonso XIII of Spain	1886 - 1931	King of Spain
King Juan Carlos I of Spain	1975–Present Day	King of Spain, House of Borbon
