= Niebla Castle (Spain) =

Castle in Niebla, Spain

Coordinates: 37.3623°N 6.6785°W

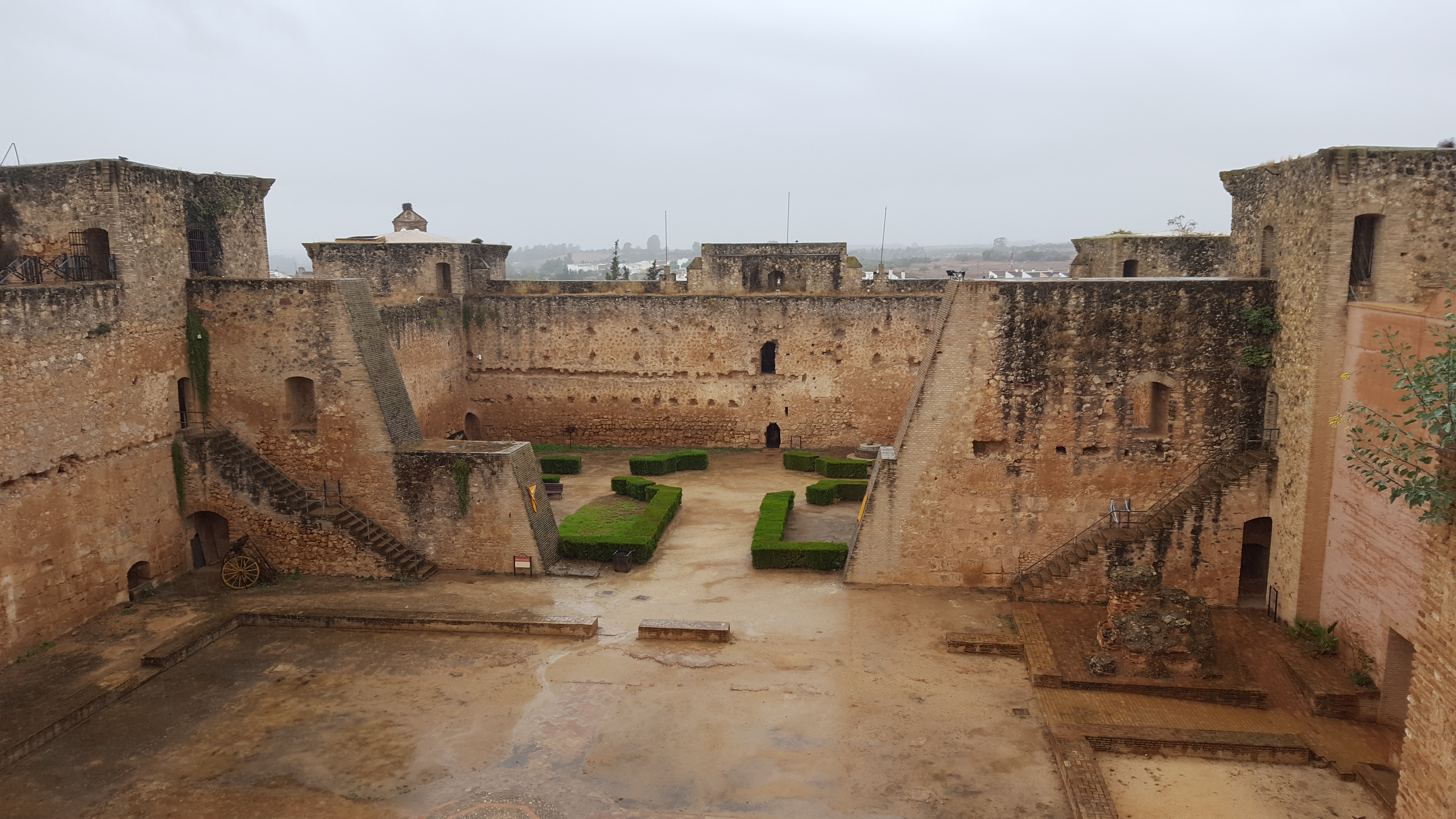
- View of one of the castle's two parade grounds

Niebla Castle (castillo de Niebla) is a mediaeval castle at Niebla, in the province of Huelva, Andalusia.

The current structure is that of the castle built by Duke Enrique de Gúzman, the 2nd Duke of medina Sidonia (died 1492) who, in the latter half of the 15th century, demolished the existing alcázar and constructed the new castle, where he, and later, his successor, Juan Alonso Pérez de Guzmán, 3rd Duke of Medina Sidonia, would reside. (Note: Pedro de Medina referred to it as one of the best and most imposing of all the castles in Andalusia. (Ladero, footnote 159.))

== Peninsular War ==
=== Siege of Niebla (1811) ===
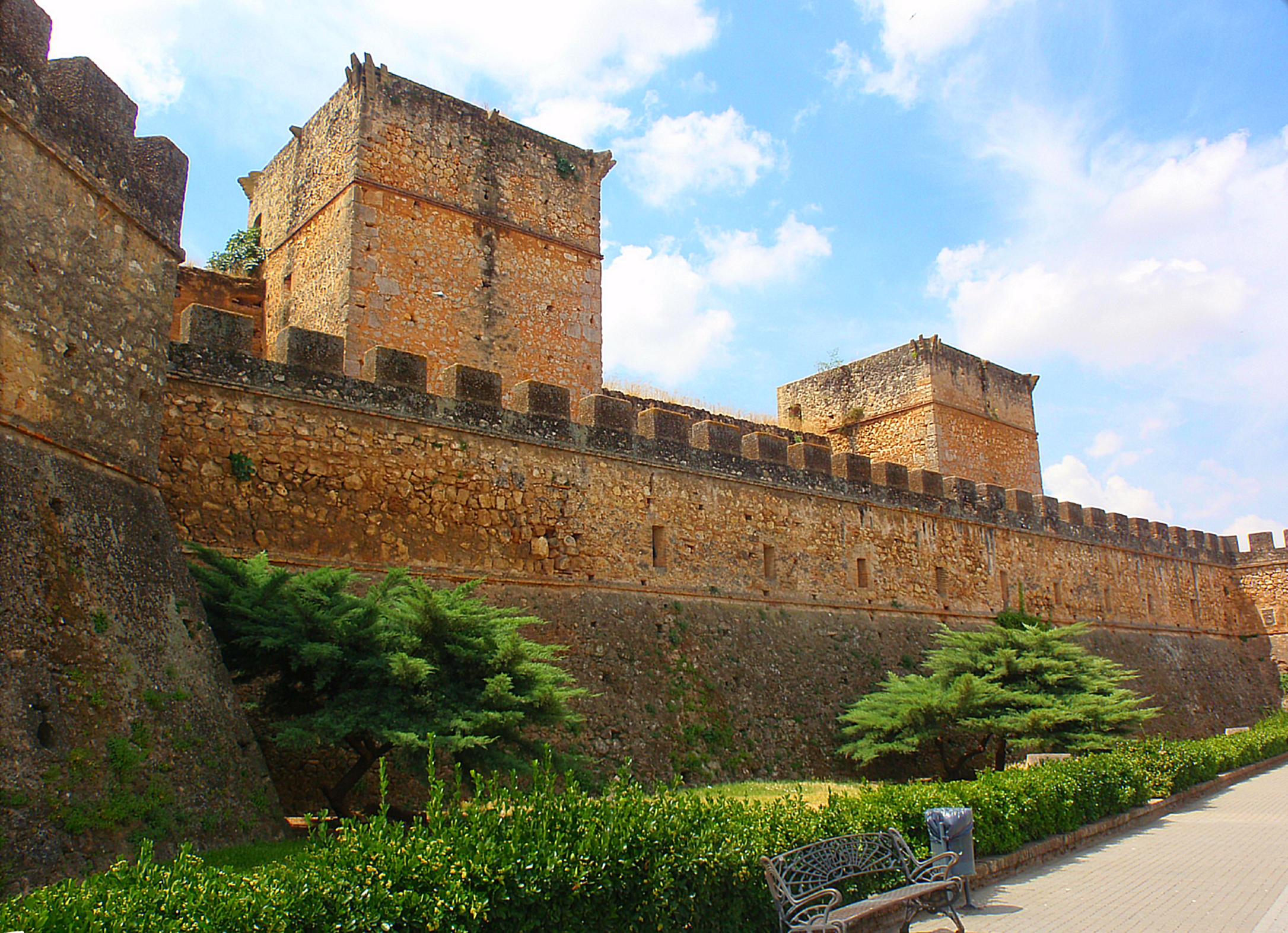
Partial view of the city walls and defensive towers

In 1811, the castle's French garrison, under Colonel Fritzhardt, with 600 Spanish and British deserters plus six cannon and two obuses, was briefly besieged by Blake and Zayas's division.

Instead of marching on Seville, as planned, Blake laid siege to the castle for five days, from 30 June to 2 July. However, an escalade having failed and having been unable to bring up artillery, due to the bad mountain roads, the Spanish troops were unable to take the place and Blake was finally forced to lift the siege on hearing that Marshal Soult's troops, under Conroux and Godinot, were heading in his direction. Although the siege itself was not successful, it did serve to draw 11,000 French troops into a remote corner of the region for some weeks.

== Cultural references ==
The Spanish poet Luis de Góngora, himself from Andalusia, refers to the castle in the initial octave of his Fábula de Polifemo y Galatea (1612), dedicated to the 11th Count of Niebla. (Note: Stanza 1, Line 5: "Ahora que de luz tu Niebla doras,..." ("Now that with light you gild your Niebla [castle],..."). (Ponce, p. 131.)) Much to the disapproval of his father, the 7th Duke of Medina Sidonia, within a couple of months of having married at Madrid, (Note: The wedding took place at the royal palace, the Royal Alcázar of Madrid, with the newly crowned King Felipe III as the best man, and the King's elder sister, infanta Isabella Clara Eugenia, as the matron of honour. (Ponce: p. 109.)) the Count had left the courtier's life of the city and retired to Huelva, where he would concentrate on extending a magnificent palace and dedicating himself to the patronage of the arts. He then turned to restoring his castle at Niebla, which Góngora refers to, (Note: Although Robert Jammes, in his La Obra poética de don Luis de Góngora y Argote, Madrid: Castalia, 1987 (p. 234, note 85). considers that Góngora could be referring to both residences; the one at Huelva and the one at Niebla. (Rico, p. 169.)) and which had been abandoned for many years, and residing both at Huelva and at Niebla.

Gongora again referred to Niebla some years later, in El Panegírico al Duque de Lerma (1618). (Note: Stanza 15: "... sidonios muros besan hoy la plata/que ilustra la alta Niebla que desata." ("... Sidonian walls today kiss the silver/that the high-standing Niebla releases."). (Ponce, p. 132.))
