= Juan Alonso Pérez de Guzmán =

Juan Alonso Pérez de Guzmán may refer to:

- Juan Alfonso Pérez de Guzmán, 3rd Duke of Medina Sidonia (1464–1507)
- Juan Alonso Pérez de Guzmán y Coronel (1285–1351), 2nd lord of Sanlúcar
