= Kingdom of Gibraltar =

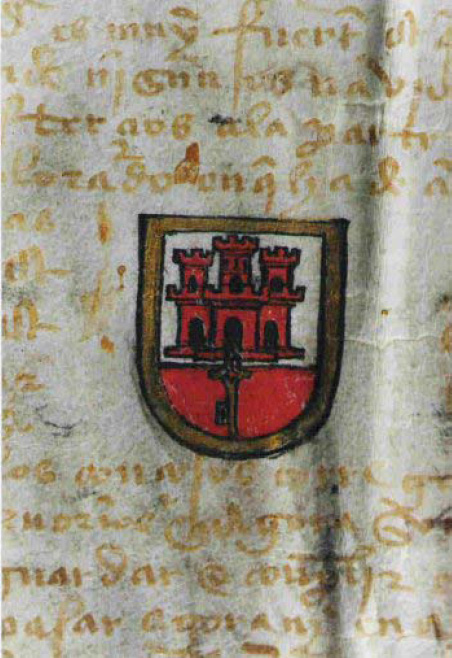
Arms granted to the city of Gibraltar by a Royal Warrant passed in Toledo on 10 July 1502 by Isabella I of Castile

The Kingdom of Gibraltar (Reino de Gibraltar) was one of the many historic substantive titles pertaining to the Castilian monarchy and its successor, the Spanish monarchy, belonging to what is known as Grand Title (Spanish: Título Grande). It was added to the monarchy titles by King Henry IV of Castile, upon the addition of Gibraltar to the Crown patrimony in 1462.

The title of “King of Gibraltar” was kept in the titles and honours of the Spanish Crown and is among the titles of the present king, Felipe VI, as only the town of Gibraltar (merely 1% of the actual Spanish Kingdom of Gibraltar) was ceded to the British Crown under Article X of the Treaty of Utrecht 1713.

== History ==
During the Middle Ages, Gibraltar was part of the Moorish Taifa of Málaga in Al-Andalus. It was captured from Castile in 1333 by Abu Malik Abd al-Wahid of the Marinid dynasty. After an unsuccessful siege led by Alfonso XI of Castile during the Reconquista period, the local governor ‘Isa ibn al-Hassan proclaimed himself “King of Gibraltar and its lands” in 1355. This title remained in Muslim hands for the next century.

Gibraltar was finally recaptured by Castile on 15 December 1462 when it fell to an army led by Enrique Pérez de Guzmán y Fonseca, later 2nd Duke of Medina Sidonia, who expelled Moors from the territory. King Henry IV of Castile, the brother of the later Queen Isabella I of Castile, rewarded the Duke with the title of Marquess of Gibraltar and added the kingship of Gibraltar to the list of titles of the Castilian crown. The territory was ceded to the Crown of Great Britain in perpetuity, under the terms of the Treaty of Utrecht of 1713. The United Kingdom, by contrast, takes the position that the treaty transferred sovereignty as well as possession.

When Gibraltar was captured by an Anglo-Dutch fleet on behalf of the Archduke Charles, claimant to the Spanish throne, in 1704, the city council and most of the population left in 1706 to found the nearby town of San Roque. The original royal warrant of 1502, which the city council took with it to San Roque along with Gibraltar’s standard and records, is now in the San Roque municipal archives. San Roque still uses a modified version of the original coat of arms of Gibraltar to symbolise its connection to Gibraltar.

== Modern usage in Gibraltar ==
In 2010, the government of Gibraltar issued coinage bearing the title “Queen of Gibraltar”. The title appeared on most Gibraltar and UK government documents when referencing Queen Elizabeth II in relation to Gibraltar. Following her death and the accession and proclamation of King Charles III in Gibraltar, Chief Minister Fabian Picardo has referred to him as “King of Gibraltar”. On February 4, 2024, Gibraltar announced that they would present coins bearing the royal cypher of King Charles III at the Berlin Money Fair.

== See also ==
- List of titles and honours of the Spanish Crown
- History of Spain
- History of Gibraltar
