= Juan Alonso de Guzmán, 1st Count of Niebla =

Count of Niebla

Don Juan Alonso de Guzmán y Cabrera, 1st Count of Niebla or Juan Alonso Pérez de Guzmán y Osorio (20 December 1342 – 5 October 1396) (Sp.:Juan Alonso de Guzmán y Cabrera, conde de Niebla) was the first Count of Niebla.

== Biography ==
He was the second son of Juan Alonso Pérez de Guzmán y Coronel and his second wife Urraca Osorio. Guzmán el Bueno was his grandfather. In 1365, Juan Alfonso de Guzmán inherited the Lordship of Sanlúcar, located in Andalusia, following the death of his older brother, Alonso Pérez.

In 1367, during the Castilian Civil War, Juan Alfonso de Guzmán decided to side with Henry II, who, after entering Castile and proclaiming himself King in the city of Burgos, appointed Guzmán Governor of Andalusia. However, after the defeat suffered by Henry II's forces at the Battle of Nájera against his brother Peter I in April 1367, Juan Alfonso de Guzmán withdrew to the Extremaduran town of Alburquerque, from where he would continue to fight against King Peter I of Castile. In retaliation, Peter I murdered Urraca Osorio, Juan Alfonso de Guzmán's mother "very cruelly" and ordered the confiscation of Urraca Osorio's property, as well as that of her son.

This violent act against his mother only strengthened the ties between Juan Alfonso de Guzmán and Henry II, who won the Civil War and became King in 1369, after killing Peter I in the Battle of Montiel.
From that time onward, as a reward for his loyalty, Juan Alfonso de Guzmán consistently held prominent positions at the Royal court, first during the reign of King Henry II and later during the reign of John I, whom he supported in the arduous and ultimately unsuccessful war waged in Portugal against John of Aviz. Later, upon the death of King John I, Juan Alfonso de Guzmán became one of the guardians of the young King Henry III, a position he assumed in 1392. The following year, 1393, Henry III came of age.
From that moment on, Juan Alfonso de Guzmán decided to retire to the city of Seville, where he died shortly afterwards, in 1394 or 1396.

=== Count of Niebla ===
The Counts of Niebla, was created not later than on 8 June 1369 at the occasion of the second marriage of Juan Alonso de Guzman y to Beatriz de Castilla y Ponce de Leon, an illegitimate daughter of Henry II of Castile. He received this title as reward for the significant services he had rendered in securing the King's accession to the throne.

=== Marriage and children ===
Juan Alonso de Guzman y Osorio (1342–1396) was married twice.

- First in 1369 to Juana Enriquez, granddaughter of Enrique Enríquez the Younger. She died without issue.
- Secondly around 1374 to Beatriz de Castilla y Ponce de Leon (d. 1409), an illegitimate daughter of Henry II of Castile.
  They had 3 sons :
  - Enrique Pérez de Guzmán, 2nd Count of Niebla and 5th Lord of Sanlúcar (1375-1436). Had issue.
  - Alfonso Pérez de Guzmán y Castilla, 5th Lord of Ayamonte, Lepe and La Redondela.
  - Juan Alonso Pérez de Guzmán, the Posthumous (d. 1436). He was born in 1396 after his father had died.

The count also had three illegitimate children : Pedro Núñez, Mayor and Leonor.

Spanish nobility
Preceded by Alonso Pérez de Guzmán y Osorio	Lord of Sanlúcar; 1365–1396	Succeeded by Enrique Pérez de Guzmán
Preceded by New Title	Count of Niebla ca.1369–1396	Succeeded by Enrique Pérez de Guzmán
