= Seventh siege of Gibraltar =

Date	1436
Location	Gibraltar 36.155341°N 5.345964°W
Result	Granadan victory

Belligerents
Kingdom of Castile	Emirate of Granada

Commanders and leaders
Enrique Pérez de Guzmán, 2nd Count de Niebla † Juan de Niebla	Unknown
- Location within Spain

The seventh siege of Gibraltar (1436 (Note: Various Spanish chroniclers say that the attack on Gibraltar took place in 1436. However Pero Tafur, a generally reliable source who took part in the attack, indicates that it happened at the end of 1435. King Juan II of Castile did not hear of the failed attack until 1436.)) was an unsuccessful attempt by the Castilian nobleman Enrique Pérez de Guzmán, 2nd Count de Niebla to capture the stronghold of Gibraltar from the Moors. He drowned during the attempt.

== Background ==
Gibraltar returned to the control of the Moorish Emirate of Granada after the occupation by Castile in 1309–1333 was ended by the successful third siege of Gibraltar. In 1411 Gibraltar was briefly occupied by the King of Fez, or Morocco. Yusuf III, Sultan of Granada, reacted quickly to news of the Moroccan action, bringing up troops and conducting a short siege after which he regained control. This failure led to the deposition of the King of Fez. The Moors used Gibraltar as a secure base from which they raided the surrounding country, where Enrique de Guzman owned large estates. They forced the valuable tunny fisheries to close down.

== Preparation ==
Enrique de Guzman wished to stop the depredations, and was also motivated to win fame by recapturing the town that his ancestor Alonso Pérez de Guzmán, founder of his noble house, had first captured in 1309. In 1436 Enrique de Guzman managed to organize a strong force of knights from Córdoba, Écija and Xeres with boats, provisions and soldiers. His son, Juan de Niebla, was given command of the land army, with 2,000 cavalry and large numbers of infantry. A two-pronged attack was planned. The land forces were to come from the north and take the castle and the heights, while the sea party would land on the Red Sands below the west of the Rock and take the town.

== Siege ==
The Moors had received warning of the planned attack and had made preparations to meet it. They had obtained supplies and additional troops from Grenada and Morocco, and had greatly strengthened the fortifications in the Red Sands area. The Count did not realize the state of preparedness of the Moors, and personally directed the boat party that attacked the Red Sands. The Moors did nothing to prevent the boat party from disembarking. After landing them, the boats returned to the fleet. The attackers found themselves on a beach between the sea and a high stone wall. The tide was coming in, reducing the beach to a narrowing strip, and the Moors were raining rocks and arrows on them from above.

De Guzman, who was superintending the guns on his ship, was warned of the massacre of his men that was occurring on shore. De Guzman went with one of the boats that attempted to rescue the Spanish force. It became loaded with men. As more tried to board it, the boat capsized and sank. De Guzman and forty knights were drowned. Juan de Guzman had found that the castle could not be taken from the north, and was preparing to take his men to help his father when he heard of the disaster. With a demoralized force and no practical action to be taken, Juan de Guzman abandoned the siege.

== Aftermath ==
The Moors found Enrique de Guzman's body, placed it in a basket and hung it from one of the castle's turrets. In 1445 King Juan II of Castile made Juan de Guzman the Duke of Medina Sidonia. The duke was to finally capture Gibraltar in the eighth siege of Gibraltar in 1462. It was only then, despite many earlier offers by the Christians to redeem the body, that his father's remains could be recovered and placed in a chapel of the Calahorra in the Castle. One of Gibraltar's gateways is named after the barcina, or wicker basket, in which Niebla was displayed.

== Notes and references ==
Notes

Citations

Sources

- Abulafia, David (2011-10-13). The Great Sea:A Human History of the Mediterranean: A Human History of the Mediterranean. Oxford University Press. p. 398. ISBN 978-0-19-532334-4.
- López de Ayala, Ignacio (1845). The History of Gibraltar: From the Earliest Period of Its Occupation by the Saracens : Comprising Details of the Numerous Conflicts for Its Possession Between the Moors and the Christians, Until Its Final Surrender in 1642 : and of Subsequent Events : with an Appendix Containing Interesting Documents. William Pickering. p. 88.
- Pierson, Peter (1989). Commander of the Armada: The Seventh Duke of Medina Sidonia. Yale University Press. ISBN 978-0-300-04408-9.
- Sayer, Frederick (1865). The history of Gibraltar and of its political relation to events in Europe. Chapman and Hall. p. 53.
- Stephens, F. G. (1873). A History of Gibraltar and Its Sieges. Provost.
- Tafur, Pero; Letts, Malcolm (1926). Travels And Adventures: 1435–1439. RoutledgeCurzon. ISBN 978-0-415-34475-3.
