= Juan Alonso Pérez de Guzmán, 6th Duke of Medina Sidonia =

6th Duke of Medina Sidonia (1502–1558)

Juan Alonso Pérez de Guzmán y de Guzmán-Zúñiga, 6th Duke of Medina Sidonia (24 March 1502 – 26 November 1558), 8th Count of Niebla, 11th Lord of Sanlúcar and 3rd Marquis of Cazaza, was a Spanish noble.

== Biography ==
He was the son of Juan Alfonso Pérez de Guzmán, 3rd Duke of Medina Sidonia, half brother of Enrique Pérez de Guzmán, 4th Duke of Medina Sidonia, and the brother of Alfonso Pérez de Guzmán, 5th Duke of Medina Sidonia.

In 1518, he had King Charles I of Spain proclaim his elder brother Alfonso impotent and incapacitated, and his marriage annulled. In that same year, he remarried his brother's wife Ana de Aragón, illegitimate daughter of Alonso de Aragón, Archbishop of Zaragoza, the illegitimate son of Ferdinand II of Aragon., and also assumed the title of 6th Duke of Medina Sidonia.

During the Revolt of the Comuneros in 1520, the Duke of Medina Sidonia, defending the loyalty of the city of Seville to the Emperor, was confronted by his brother-in-law, Pedro Girón, a prominent Comunero, who aspired to seize the dukedom, taking advantage of the situation, but without success.

Cultured and refined, he employed a team of artisans. A great music lover, he also had a chapel, an organist, and minstrels in his service. He was also a staunch follower of Erasmus, and sought to improve primary education for children in the towns and villages of his estates. His own children received tutors, learned Latin, and read the classics.

=== Children ===
From his marriage to Ana of Aragón (1500-1556), he had 4 children :

- Juan Carlos de Guzmán y Aragón (d. 1556), 9th Count of Niebla, married Leonor de Zúñiga y Sotomayor and had a son, Alonso Pérez de Guzmán, 7th Duke of Medina Sidonia
- Fernando, died young
- Ana Pérez de Guzmán y Aragón (1527–1589), married Íñigo Fernández de Velasco, 4th Duke of Frías, with issue
- Leonor Ana de Guzmán y Aragón (1537 – 23 November 1573), married Pedro Téllez-Girón, 1st Duke of Osuna, with issue

As Don Juan Carlos predeceased his father in 1556, the title passed to his eldest grandson Alonso Pérez de Guzmán, 7th Duke of Medina Sidonia (1550–1615).

Spanish nobility
Preceded by Alfonso Pérez de Guzmán	Duke of Medina Sidonia; 1518–1559	Succeeded by Alonso Pérez de Guzmán
