= Rodrigo Núñez de Guzmán =

Spanish nobleman

- Lord
- Born: 12th-century Spain
- Died: 12th-century Spain
- Noble family: House of Lara

Rodrigo Núñez de Guzmán (12th-century) was a Spanish nobleman, Lord of the Castle of Guzmán.

== Biography ==
His wife was Goda González de Lara, descendant of Gonzalo Núñez de Lara, (Lord of Lara).
