= Alonso de Guzmán y Sotomayor, 7th Duke of Medina Sidonia =

Spanish aristocrat (1550–1615)

The Duke of Medina Sidonia
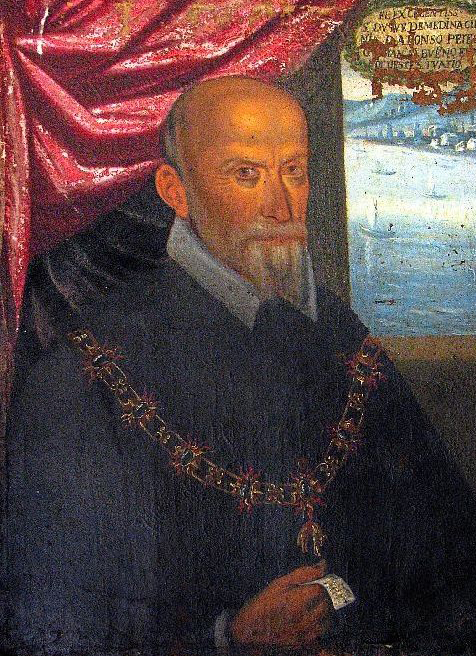
- Portrayed wearing the Order of the Golden Fleece, c. 1612
- Born: 10 September 1550; Sanlúcar de Barrameda, Cádiz, Crown of Castile, Spain
- Died: 26 July 1615 (aged 64); Sanlúcar de Barrameda, Cádiz, Castile, Spain
- Military career
- Allegiance: Spain
- Branch: Spanish Navy
- Rank: Captain-General of the Ocean Sea; Captain-General of the Coast of Andalusia
- Commands: Invasion of England ('the Spanish Armada')
- Conflicts: War of the Portuguese Succession; Anglo–Spanish War (1585–1604): Cadiz; Gravelines

Alonso Pérez de Guzmán y de Zúñiga-Sotomayor, 7th Duke of Medina Sidonia, GE (10 September 1550 – 26 July 1615), was a Spanish aristocrat who was most noted for his role as commander of the Spanish Armada that was to attack Southern England in 1588. He was a great-great grandson of Ferdinand II of Aragon.

He was one of the wealthiest men in Europe and a patron of the arts. Successful for his prodigious logistic ability, he organized naval defense and commerce in the southern Iberian Peninsula, managing fleets and pioneering the usage of vessels like frigates. Despite this, he was not personally a naval commander, which contributed to the failure of the Spanish Armada, entrusted to him against his judgement. His defective performance during the battle marked his career in late historiography.

== Family ==
Alonso's father was Juan Carlos Pérez de Guzmán, who died in 1556. This was two years before the death of his own father, Juan Alfonso Pérez de Guzmán, 6th Duke of Medina Sidonia, meaning that Juan Carlos failed to inherit the ducal title and died merely as the 9th Count of Niebla.

His paternal grandmother, who died in 1528, was Ana de Aragón y de Gurrea, an illegitimate daughter of Alonso de Aragón y Ruiz de Iborra, Archbishop of Zaragoza, himself an illegitimate son of king Ferdinand II of Aragón. In 1518 Ana de Aragón had married in succession two Dukes of Medina Sidonia. The first marriage was to Alfonso Pérez de Guzmán, 5th Duke of Medina Sidonia, who was to die childless in 1548. He was declared insane ("mentecato"), which invalidated the marriage and vacated the succession to the title. The bride was then married, in the same year, to the 5th Duke's brother, Juan Alfonso, the 6th Duke, born on 24 March 1502. He would survive his bride by three decades, dying at Sanlúcar de Barrameda, in the province of Cádiz, Spain, on 26 November 1558.

Alonso's mother was Leonor de Zúñiga y Sotomayor, a most powerful and wealthy woman, herself daughter of the powerful duchess Teresa de Zúñiga, 2nd marchioness of Ayamonte, 3rd duchess of Béjar, 4th countess of Bañares, 2nd marchioness of Gibraleón, so it was her name Zúñiga, the one to be passed to the family, as she was married to a "Sotomayor" of a family less endowed with nobility titles, county of Belalcázar, something by no means unique in the high Spanish aristocracy of the time.

As Alonso's father, Juan Carlos, had already died in 1556, it was on the death of his grandfather in 1559, that Alonso, only some nine years of age at the time, inherited the ducal title along with one of the greatest fortunes in Europe.

== Betrothal and marriage ==
The 7th duke was betrothed in 1569 to Ana de Silva y Mendoza, who was then four years of age, the daughter of the Prince and the Princess of Éboli. In 1572 when the duchess was little more than ten years of age, the pope granted a dispensation for the consummation of the marriage. The Duke of Medina Sidonia had a son, Juan Manuel, who succeeded his father.

A scandal of the time accused Philip II of a love intrigue with the young girl's mother, the Princess of Éboli. The constant unvarying and apparently unmotivated favor the king showed the duke has been accounted for by claiming he simply took a fatherly interest in the girl. In any case no proof has been discovered of any relation between the king and the princess.

Don Alonso made no serious effort to save his mother-in-law Ana de Mendoza, Princess of Éboli from the later persecution she suffered at the hands of Philip II. His correspondence is full of whining complaints of poverty, and appeals to the king for pecuniary favors. In 1581 he was created a knight of the Golden Fleece, and was named Captain General of Lombardy. By pressing supplications to the king he got himself exempted on the ground of poverty and poor health.

Don Alonso was also the patron of Don Jerónimo Sánchez de Carranza who wrote the premier text on the Spanish system of swordplay which was called the 'True Art' or the Verdadera Destreza. He was asked by King Philip II of Spain to lead the Spanish Armada.

== Spanish Armada ==
=== Preparations ===
When the Marquis of Santa Cruz died, on 9 February 1588, Philip insisted on appointing the 7th Duke to the command of the Armada. He had prepared his orders to the Duke of Medina Sidonia already three days before the death of Santa Cruz. The motivation of Philip's decision is unknown, but it may have been grounded in his consideration of the duke's very high social rank, administrative competence, modesty and tactfulness, and last but not least his reputation as a good Catholic. The micro-managing king probably wanted a commander who would obey his instructions to the letter, which had been less likely had command been in the hands of Santa Cruz, or either of the most experienced officers in the Armada, Juan Martinez de Recalde and Miguel de Oquendo.

The disadvantages of this choice of Medina Sidonia were highlighted by the latter himself in a letter to the king, in which he stressed his lack of military experience on land and at sea, his lack of information about either the English enemy or the Spanish war plans, his poor health and tendency to sea-sickness, and his inability to contribute financially to the expedition. Philip II may never have seen this letter, for his secretaries Don Juan de Idiaquez and Don Cristobal de Moura replied to the duke that they dared not show it to the king. Even though the king did or did not read the Medina Sidonia's letter, Philip himself was confident that there were no issues. As the king himself was a devout Catholic, he was certain that God would favor the Armada as a means to punish the English for their Protestant heresy and restore them and Dutch to the One True Faith. After all, he had secured a blessing from Pope Sixtus V a papal blessing, which was given somewhat reluctantly.

Historians have speculated that Medina Sidonia himself did not believe in the success of the Armada, and that this motivated his attempt to reject the command as also a later letter he wrote to the king, advising an attempt to conclude peace or at least postpone the operation. What general opinion of the duke may have been is unrecorded, but it is known that skepticism regarding the Armada's prospects existed among senior Spanish officers and informed foreign commentators.

The opinion of modern historians on Medina Sidonia's efforts to prepare the Armada is generally favorable. He reorganized the fleet, rationalized the chaotic distribution of loads and guns, and increased the ammunition supplies from 30 to 50 rounds per gun. The permission of the king to add the Castilian galleons of the "Indian Guard" to the Armada nearly doubled its first-line fighting strength. Under the duke's command the material state of the Armada and the manning of the ships was much improved. The distribution of cannons and ammunition was rationalized, and Medina Sidonia got permission from Philip to lodge some of his men ashore; prior to that, the king had insisted that the sailors be kept aboard their ships at all times, a policy which had a disastrous effect on the health and morale of the fleet. Medina Sidonia managed to establish good relationships with his subordinate commanders, and gathered additional supplies right up to the moment of sailing.

=== Fleet command ===
Medina Sidonia's behavior as a fleet commander in the ensuing series of fights with the English has come under more criticism. Lacking military experience, he showed little initiative or self-confidence, instead cautiously obeying the instructions of the king, and relying on the opinion of his advisers and subordinate commanders. This tendency was reinforced by the senior adviser appointed to him by the king, Diego Flores de Valdes, an experienced sea officer but also a man renowned for his caution. Medina Sidonia also seriously underestimated the difficulty of coordinating his actions with the commander of the Spanish forces in the Netherlands, Alexander Farnese, Duke of Parma, who was supposed to launch his invasion fleet to meet the Armada at sea. However, this problem was fundamental to the operational plan imposed on the two commanders by Philip II.

Allowing for the limitations inherent in a total lack of command experience, Medina Sidonia fought the battle courageously and intelligently. His health suffered badly as a result of the campaign, and after his return to Spain the king finally relieved him of his command and granted him permission to return home to convalesce. Later, he served the Spanish crown for another two decades in various functions. The duke's reputation suffered, because several popular accounts, notably the one written by the monk Juan de Victoria, placed all blame for the defeat on him.

Informed commentators and modern historians have put most of the blame on Philip II himself for imposing an impractical plan on his commanders, and on Diego Flores de Valdes for badly advising the duke. Philip II himself did not single out his chosen commander to bear the responsibility for the defeat. He stated "Action without cause is illegitimate of reason" in response to public outcry on re-sending a fleet to Britain. The duke retained his posts of admiral of the ocean and captain-general of Andalusia, and continued to serve Philip II and later Philip III.

The popular image of the duke in later years was strongly influenced by propaganda surrounding the Armada, including an English account which claimed that the Duke of Medina Sidonia was a fool and a coward who hid below decks in a specially reinforced room. This story became a lasting part of popular descriptions of the battle, in which the Duke of Medinia Sidonia was frequently portrayed as an incompetent buffoon.

== Later years ==
When an English fleet attacked Cádiz in 1596, Medina Sidonia's allegedly slow response was blamed for giving the English enough time to sack the city.

In 1606 Medina Sidonia's obstinacy caused the loss of a squadron which was destroyed near Gibraltar by the Dutch. This episode made the duke a satirical target of Miguel de Cervantes.

== In popular culture ==
- In the Belgian Suske en Wiske comic book story "De Stierentemmer" ("The Bull Tamer") (1952) the character Aunt Sidonia learns that she is related to the 16th century duke of Medina Sidonia, Alonso Pérez de Guzmán. In the Dutch educational comic strip series Van Nul tot Nu (1982), which tells the history of the Netherlands in comic book form, Alonso Pérez de Guzmán is caricatured as Tante Sidonia as a nod to Suske en Wiske.
- The children's fantasy novel The House with a Clock in Its Walls features an appearance by the Duke of Medina Sidonia, in command of the Armada, as a type of magical hologram. This element was not included in the 2018 film adaptation.
- The alternate history novel Ruled Britannia is set in a world where the Duke's Armada defeated the English. While the Duke does not appear, his fictitious nephew Baltasar Guzmán, an army officer, is a prominent character.

== Ancestry ==
Ancestors of Alonso de Guzmán y Sotomayor, 7th Duke of Medina Sidonia

8. Juan Alfonso Pérez de Guzmán, 3rd Duke of Medina Sidonia
4. Juan Alfonso Pérez de Guzmán, 6th Duke of Medina Sidonia
9. Leonor de Zuñiga
2. Juan Carlos Pérez de Guzmán, 9th Count of Niebla
10. Alfonso de Aragón, Archbishop of Zaragoza
5. Ana de Aragón
11. Ana de Gurrea
1. Alonso Pérez de Guzmán, 7th Duke of Medina Sidonia
12. Alonso de Sotomaior, 4th Count of Belalcázar
6. Francisco de Sotomayor, 5th Count of Belalcázar
13. Isabel de Castro
3. Leonor de Sotomayor
14. Francisco de Zuñiga y Guzman, 1st Marquis of Ayamonte
7. Teresa de Zúñiga, 3rd Duchess of Béjar
15. Leonor Manrique de Castro

== See also ==
- Duke of Medina Sidonia
- Medina Sidonia

== Notes ==
Spanish nobility
Preceded by Juan Alfonso Pérez de Guzmán	Duke of Medina Sidonia; 1558–1615	Succeeded by Juan Manuel Pérez de Guzmán
