= Moorish Baths, Gibraltar =

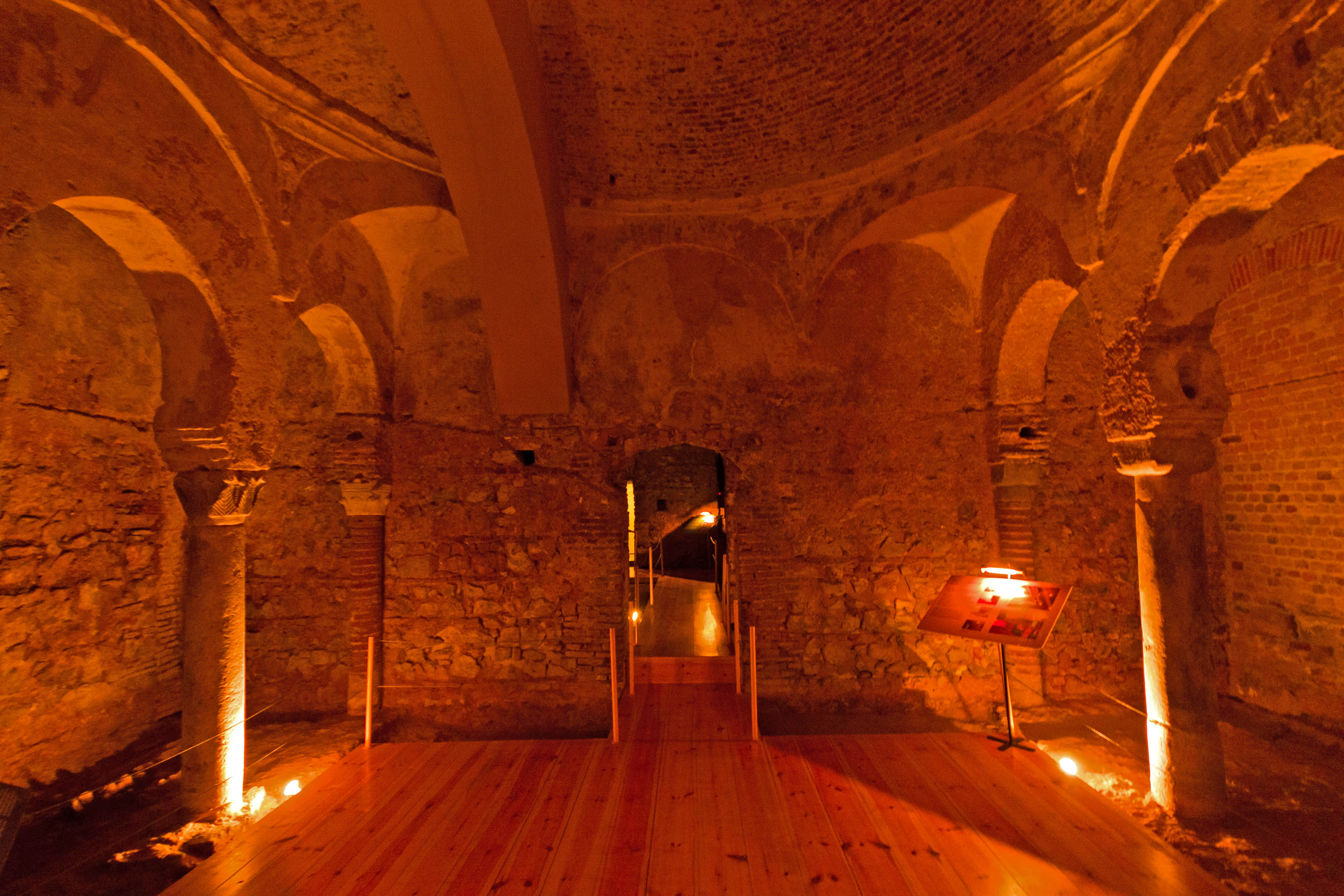
- Central chamber of the Moorish Baths at the Gibraltar Museum

- Location within Gibraltar

General information
- Status: Restored
- Type: Medieval
- Architectural style: Moorish
- Location: Europa Point, Gibraltar, Gibraltar, Gibraltar
- Coordinates: 36.1390°N 5.3544°W
- Construction started: Moorish Period
- Owner: Government of Gibraltar

The Moorish Baths are located in the basement of the Gibraltar Museum in the city of Gibraltar, a British overseas territory. One of the best-preserved Moorish bath houses in Europe, the early 14th century baths bear resemblance to the Roman hypocaust system, and have four chambers with pillars.

== Location ==
The museum, founded on 23 July 1930, is situated on Bomb House Lane, branching from the main street. It is opposite the Cathedral of St. Mary the Crowned. The baths, located within the museum's basement level, can be accessed only from the interior of the museum.

== History ==
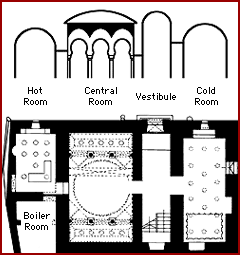
Plan of the Moorish Baths in Gibraltar.

The baths were built around the 14th century, after Gibraltar's occupation by Abu al-Hasan Ali ibn Othman. One source dates the baths to 1355 during the rule of the Marinid dynasty. Records state that they were private baths, part of the palace of the Governor of Gibraltar. The site is considered to be one of the best-preserved Moorish bath houses in Europe. In 1906, James Edward Budgett-Meakin, an authority on Moorish antiquities, wrote of these baths:

Apart from the Alhambra there is nothing in Spain to compare with the site; and as in Morocco such baths may not be entered by Nazarenes or Jews, its interest is exceptional.

== Architecture and fittings ==
The baths, similar in design to ancient Roman baths, have both cold and hot chambers. Heating is provided by a hypocaust. There are four chambers with arch formations supported on a pillar system, a 16-sided vaulted roof, a steam room, as well as hot and cold baths.

The baths contain four chambers whose structural features are made up of a number of columns. The main hall, which has a central dome, consists of six arches supported on columns with capitals, which are of different designs; four pillars are small and built with half-bricks, three pillars made of stone are polished, and one pillar is a stand-alone built in bricks. There are four capitals above the pillars, of which three are of Visigothic design, while one is of Roman design. Vestibules are part of the main hall which, when in use, were screened to provide privacy to the bathers. Each of the four chambers has natural lighting provided by star-shaped openings in the roof. The room with the heated water, located at the northern part of the baths, has a large arched entry. The plunge bath is located at the southern end. Also noted are underground ducts which convey hot air from the boiler chamber.

Excavations in the museum's garden uncovered a water conduit from the Spanish period. The conduit is thought to be connected to an aqueduct that traverses Line Wall Road and has its source in wells south of the town. The conduit enters the garden from the road and continues under the rooms, ending in a cistern that has been dug beneath an interior patio.

== See also ==
- Moorish Gibraltar

== Bibliography ==
- American Automobile Association (1987). AAA Travel Guide to Europe. American Automobile Association.
- Garvey, Geoff; Ellingham, Mark (2003). The Rough Guide to Andalucia. Rough Guides. ISBN 978-1-84353-068-8.
- Gibraltar. Department of Labour and Social Security (1967). Report. Gibraltar. Department of Labour and Social Security.
- Harvey, Maurice (January 1996). Gibraltar. Spellmount. ISBN 978-1-873376-57-7.
- Tocchini, Ronald Joseph (31 October 2012). Cruising the Mediterranean and Beyond. Trafford Publishing. ISBN 978-1-4669-6619-2.
