= Alonso Pérez de Guzmán =

Spanish nobleman (1256–1309)

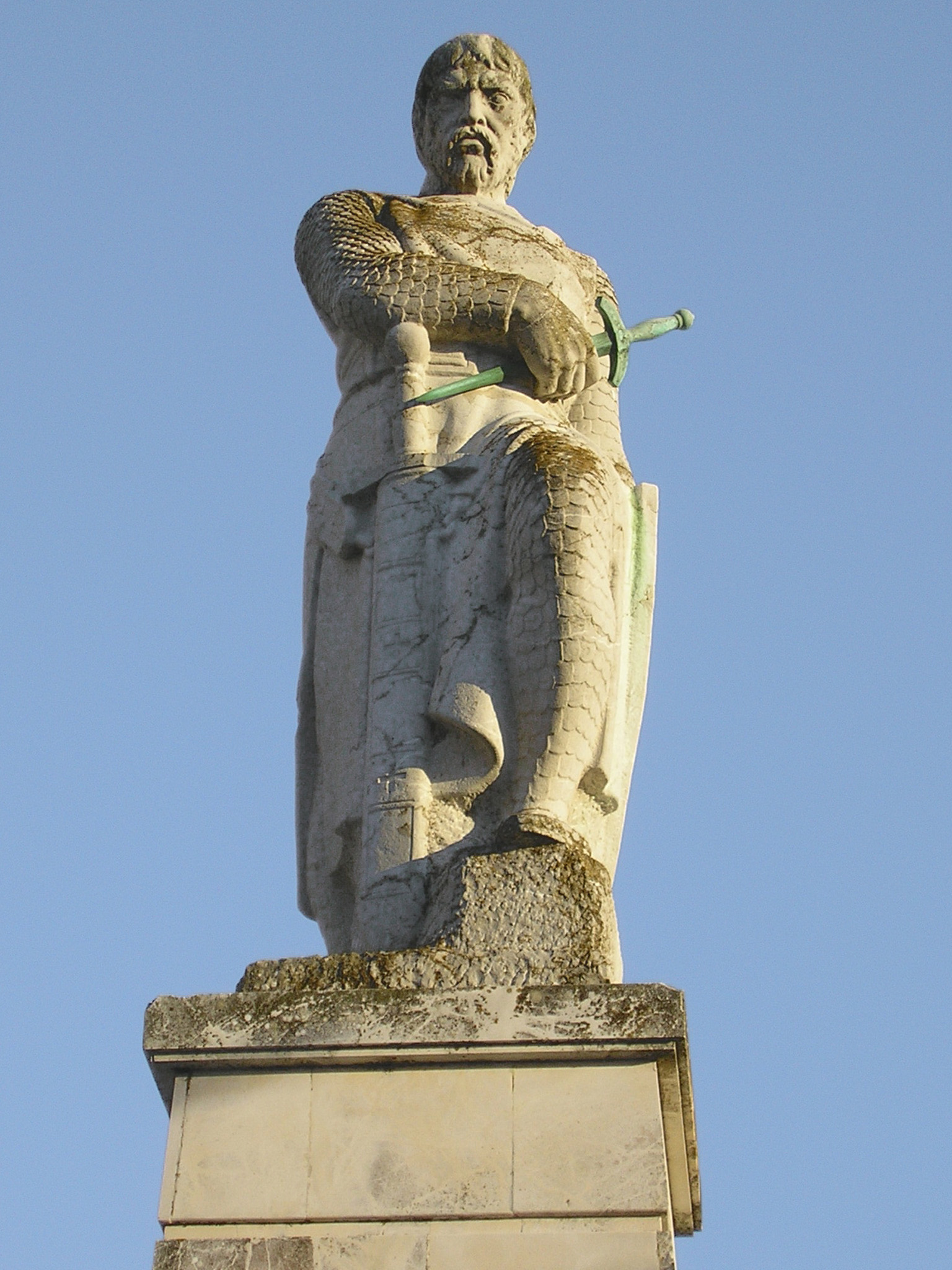
- Statue of Guzman El Bueno in Tarifa
- Born: 24 January 1256; León, Crown of Castile
- Died: 19 September 1309 (aged 53); Gaucín, Crown of Castile
- Military career
- Allegiance: Crown of Castile
- Conflicts: Battle of Arjona; First Siege of Gibraltar

Alonso Pérez de Guzmán (1256–1309), known as Guzmán el Bueno ("Guzmán the Good"), was a Spanish nobleman and hero of Spain during the medieval period. Guzmán is the progenitor of the Dukes of Medina Sidonia, the oldest extant dukedom in the Kingdom of Castile.

== Biography ==
Alonso Pérez de Guzmán was born on 24 January 1256, probably in León, bastard son of Pedro Núñez de Guzmán, adelantado mayor (governor) of Castile, himself son of Guillén Pérez de Guzmán.

=== Origins ===
According to Spanish tradition, Guzmán was born in Morocco. Historians have since speculated that he was a Muslim. In a permit to export wheat signed in 1288, Guzmán was given permission to export the crop to where "he is from", very likely in Morocco. A document from 1297 signed by the Spanish king refers to Guzmán as "a vassal", i.e. a non-Spaniard. The document was owned by the late Luisa Isabel Álvarez de Toledo, 21st Duchess of Medina Sidonia. A direct descendant of Guzmán, she said that she believed his history might have been "cleaned up" in the sixteenth century to alter his origins. She thought that would have made the hero more palatable to Spain's Christian society.

=== Royal grants ===
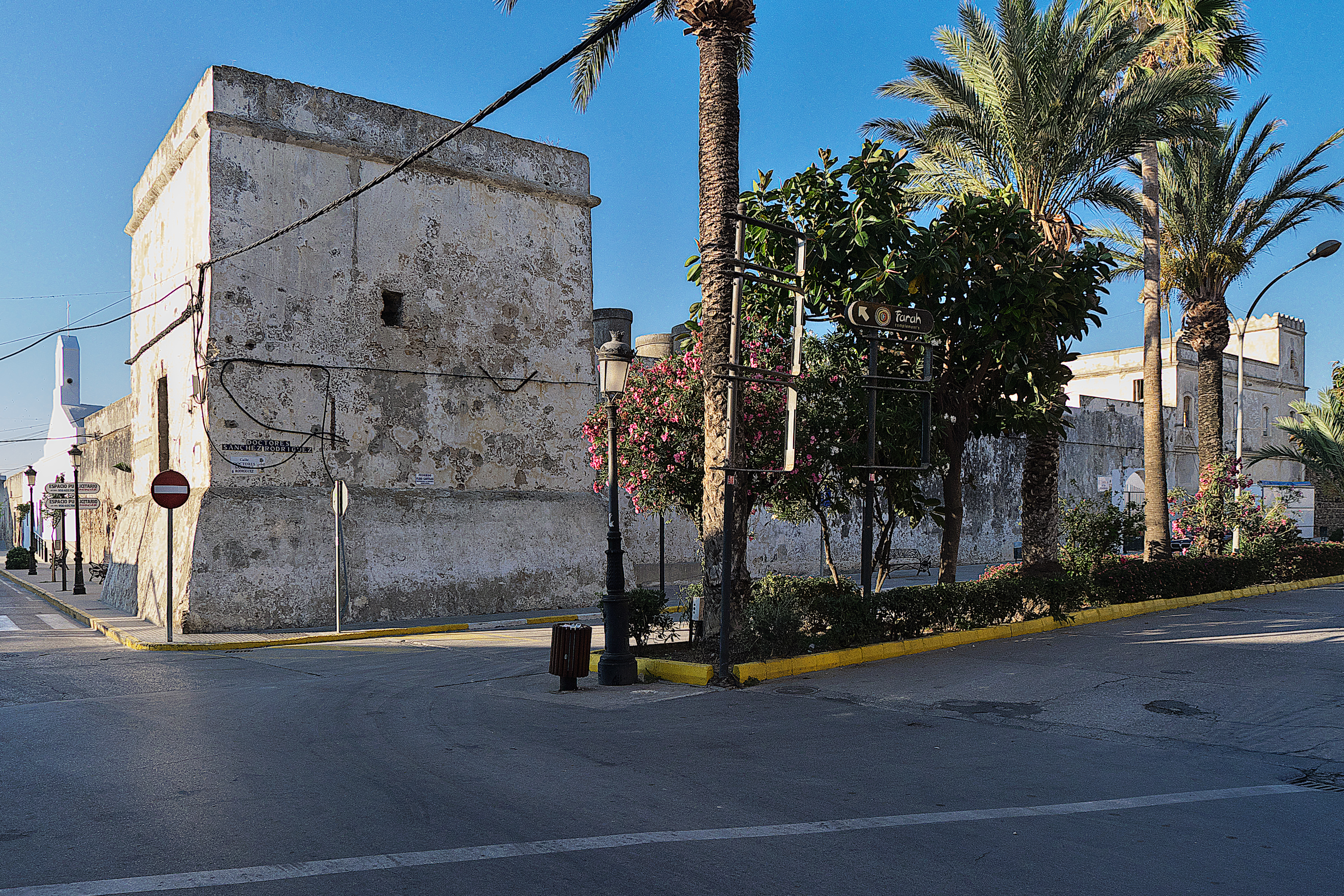
Guzmán's Castle of Zahara de los Atunes and Palace of Jadraza.

In 1294 Guzmán was granted tuna fishing rights by King Sancho IV of Castile in reward for his heroic defence of Tarifa. He built the Castle of Zahara de los Atunes and Palace of Jadraza as a defensive castle, which incorporated a seasonal residential palace and tuna processing facility.

=== Siege of Tarifa ===
In 1294 Alonso de Guzmán defended the town of Tarifa on behalf of Sancho IV of Castile. Guzmán had been given charge of Tarifa, recently captured from the Moors, despite having fought for Alfonso X against the rebellion of his son Sancho IV. Guzmán held Tarifa's castle against the siege of the Moors and the Infante Juan, Sancho's rebellious brother. Guzmán's son Pedro had been placed under the care of Juan, who threatened to kill the captive unless Guzmán surrendered the city.

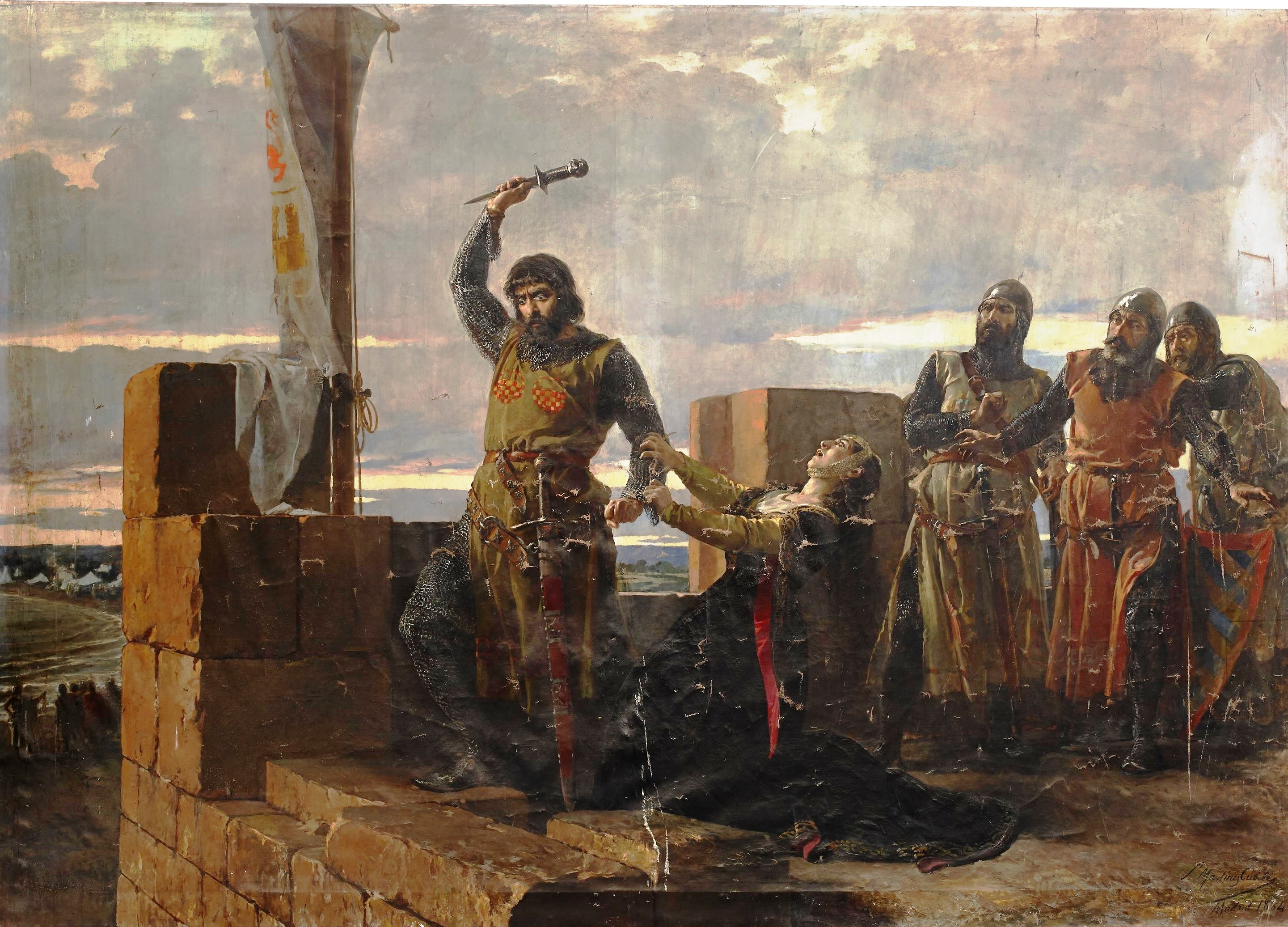
Throwing the Dagger, by Salvador Martínez Cubells (1883)

According to legend, Guzmán rebuffed the demand with dramatic words. According to one rendition,

I did not beget a son to be made use of against my country, but that he should serve her against her foes. Should Don Juan put him to death, he will but confer honour on me, true life on my son, and on himself eternal shame in this world and everlasting wrath after death.

Guzmán reportedly threw down his knife for the besiegers to use in killing his son. He was rewarded for his defense of the castle with large grants of Crown land. In 1309 Guzmán helped Ferdinand IV of Castile capture Gibraltar from the Moors, who had held it for nearly 600 years since 711.

=== Dukedom of Medina Sidonia ===
The ducal title of Medina Sidonia was conferred by John II in 1445 on one of his descendants, Juan Alonso de Guzmán, count of Niebla.

=== Marriage and children ===
He married María Alonso Coronel (1267-1330), and had following children :

- Juan Alonso Pérez de Guzmán (d. 1351), 2nd Lord of Sanlúcar, married Beatriz, daughter of Fernán Pérez Ponce de León.
- Pedro Alonso Pérez de Guzmán (d. 1294). He was assassinated before the walls of Tarifa in 1294, in an attempt to force his father to surrender the fortress.
- Leonor de Guzmán (d. after 1341). She married Luis de la Cerda, great-grandson of Alfonso X of Castile.
- Isabel de Guzmán, Lady of Rota and Chipiona. She married Fernando Ponce de León, son of Fernán Pérez Ponce de León.

He also had an illegitimate daughter

- Teresa Alfonso, married to Juan de Ortega, son of Juan Matheo de Luna, Admiral of Castile.

=== Descendants ===
The addition "El Bueno" to the family name of Guzmán was used by several of his descendants, who have included statesmen, generals and colonial viceroys. Guzmán was the great-great-great-grandfather of Garcí Bravo de Medrano, Catalina de Medrano, and Luisa de Medrano—the renowned poet, philosopher, and professor at the University of Salamanca—as well as their other siblings, through their mother, Magdalena Bravo de Lagunas.

== Legacy ==
- Guzmán and his life have been explored by numerous Spanish playwrights, including Antonio Gil y Zárate in his Guzmán el bueno. Drama en Cuatro Actos, 1840s.
- Luis Velez de Guevara (1570–1644), Más pesa el Rey que la Sangre
- Nicolás Fernández de Moratín (1737–1780), play dated 1777
- The Guzmán el Bueno metro stop in Madrid is named in his honor, and a street where the Madrid Civil Guard barracks is.
- Alonso appears in the scene of the dagger, in the play Anthology theatrical by the author Juan José Videgain, recognized as his descendant.

Preceded by Title Created	Señor de Sanlúcar; 1297–1309	Succeeded by Juan Alonso Pérez de Guzmán y Coronel

== See also ==
- Dukes of Medina Sidonia
- Siege of Gibraltar (1309)

== Sources ==
- Hobbs, Nicolas (2007). "Grandes de España" (in Spanish). Archived from the original on 25 October 2008.
- "19th century romanticized British account".
