= Eighth siege of Gibraltar =

Date	1462
Location	Gibraltar 36.155341°N 5.345964°W
Result	Castilian victory

Belligerents
Crown of Castile	Emirate of Granada

Commanders and leaders
Juan Alonso de Guzmán; Alonso de Arcos; Rodrigo de Arcos	Unknown
- Location within Spain

The eighth siege of Gibraltar (1462) was a successful effort by soldiers of the Kingdom of Castile to take the fortified town of Gibraltar from the Moors of the Emirate of Granada. Capture of this position, which was weakly defended and was taken with little fighting, was strategically important in the final defeat of the Moors in Spain.

== Background ==
Gibraltar occupied a strategic position in the Middle Ages, serving as a gateway for armed forces from Morocco to enter the Iberian Peninsula. Gibraltar had been a Moorish possession for 748 years, apart from a few short intervals of foreign control. By the early 15th century, the Castilians had conquered much of Granada, but the Moors used Gibraltar as a secure base from which they raided the surrounding country.

The largest landowner in the region, Enrique Pérez de Guzmán, 2nd Count de Niebla, died in an ill-planned attack on Gibraltar in 1435. The Moors recovered Count Enrique's body and placed it in a barcina, or wicker basket, that they suspended from the castle wall. The Moors rejected many offers by the Christians to redeem the body. However, by the 1460s the Moorish kingdom was fatally weakened and would not last much longer.

== Capture of Gibraltar ==
In August 1462, a Christian convert from Gibraltar passed word to the Castilians that a large part of the garrison had temporarily left the town. Ali-l-Carro, a converted Moor, informed the Governor of Tarifa, Alonzo of Arcos, that the fortress was almost defenseless. The next day Arcos made an attack. He captured some Moorish soldiers and tortured them to gain information of the size of the garrison, which turned out to be too large for him to succeed with his own small forces. Alonzo of Arcos called for help from the surrounding towns, from his kinsman Alonzo, Count de Arcos, Alcade of Algeciras and from Juan Alonso de Guzmán, 1st Duke of Medina Sidonia, the most powerful noble in the region. The Duke was son of Enrique Pérez de Guzmán, who had died in 1435, and had assisted him in that attack.

When the first troops arrived, the Governor Alonzo of Arcos made an attack that was easily repelled.

However, another deserter brought news that the garrison was arguing whether to surrender, and if so on what terms. Soon after a delegation of Moors came and offered to surrender if they were allowed to leave and take their property. Alonzo of Arcos deferred the decision to accept these terms until someone with greater authority arrived. Rodrigo, son of the Count of Arcos, reached the scene. He also felt unable to grant conditions of surrender. However, Rodrigo took control of the city gates, at which the Moors retreated to the castle.

When the Duke of Medina Sidonia eventually showed up there was a dispute over who should have the honor of taking the castle. To avoid coming to blows, it was agreed that the Duke and the Count of Arcos would enter the fortress at the same time and set up their banners simultaneously.

After a few days of negotiation, on condition of being allowed to leave with their possessions the defenders surrendered to Medina Sidonia. The castle was taken on 16 August 1462. The "siege" is perhaps misnamed, since there was little fighting and no use of siege weapons.

== Aftermath ==
The Duke occupied and garrisoned the fortress. There was a risk of violence between his forces and those of the Count of Arcos, but this was avoided. The remains of Count Enrique were recovered and placed in a chapel of the Calahorra in the Castle. King Henry IV of Castile added the name of Gibraltar to his list of titles. He gave the town the arms of a castle with a key pendant, signifying that it is the key to the Mediterranean. Henry appointed Pedro de Porras Governor, and then Beltrán de la Cueva. A few years later, during an internal power struggle between Henry IV and a group of nobles supporting his brother Alfonso, the Duke of Medina Sidonia again besieged Gibraltar. After a fifteen-month siege, the Duke took the town. His family would control Gibraltar until 1502, when the crown of Castile finally took possession.
