= Juan Alonso Pérez de Guzmán y Coronel =

Juan Alonso Pérez de Guzmán y Coronel (1285-1351), second lord of Sanlúcar, was a Castilian noble of the house of Medina Sidonia. He was the son of Alonso Pérez de Guzmán and María Alfonso Coronel. He defeated the troops of the King of Portugal in the Battle of Villanueva de Barcarrota (1336). He died in 1351.

== Family ==
From his first marriage in 1303 to Beatriz Ponce de León y Meneses, great granddaughter of King Alfonso IX of León and daughter of Fernán Pérez Ponce de León I, commander of the frontier of Andalusia and lord of Puebla de Asturias, two children were born:

- Alonso de Guzman (died December 1330). He died at nine years of age, as a result of being butted by a deer, and was buried in the monastery of San Isidoro del Campo.
- María de Guzmán, died childless.

He remarried in 1334 to Urraca Osorio (died 1367), daughter of Álvar Núñez Osorio and Mayor Perez, who had:

- Alonso Pérez de Guzmán y Osorio (died 1365), third Lord of Sanlúcar. Died during the Siege of Orihuela. No issue.
- Juan Alonso Pérez de Guzmán y Osorio (1342-1396), fourth Lord of Sanlúcar and first Count of Niebla.

Preceded by Alonso Pérez de Guzmán	Señor de Sanlúcar; 1309–1351	Succeeded by Alonso Pérez de Guzmán y Osorio
