= Marquisate of Gibraltar =

Marquess of Gibraltar
- Arms of Gibraltar (1506–1713)
- Creation date: 30 September 1478
- Created by: Isabella I of Castile
- Peerage: Peerage of Castile
- First holder: Enrique Pérez de Guzmán y Fonseca, 2nd Duke of Medina Sidonia
- Last holder: Juan Alonso Pérez de Guzmán, 3rd Duke of Medina Sidonia
- Status: Extinct
- Extinction date: 22 December 1501

Marquess of Gibraltar was a short-lived Castilian noble title (1478–1501). It belonged to the House of Medina Sidonia.

== Marquesses of Gibraltar ==
- Enrique Pérez de Guzmán y Fonseca, 2nd Duke of Medina Sidonia (1478–1492)
- Juan Alonso Pérez de Guzmán, 3rd Duke of Medina Sidonia (1492–1501)

== History ==
The marquessate was created by the Queen Isabella I of Castile to reward Enrique Pérez de Guzmán, 2nd Duke of Medina Sidonia. The Duke of Medina Sidonia had been recognized his rights and powers over the town of Gibraltar and its Campo by Isabella upon the death of Henry IV, her predecessor. As him, the Catholic Monarchs had to face a turbulent nobility. In Andalucía, the most powerful and rival families were the Guzmans (the Dukes of Medina Sidonia) and the Ponce de Leons (the Dukes of Arcos).

Rodrigo Ponce de León had been rewarded in 1471 by Henry IV with the Marquessate of Cádiz for his participation in the capture of Gibraltar in 1462. In order to balance the awards granted to the noble families, Isabella of Castile issued on September 30, 1478, a letters patent naming the Duke of Medina Sidonia, Marquess of Gibraltar. The Queen used the formula we name you Marquess of your city of Gibraltar.

After the Duke's death in 1492, the Catholic Monarchs reluctantly renewed the title to Juan Alfonso Pérez de Guzmán, 3rd Duke of Medina Sidonia, and therefore, 2nd Marquis of Gibraltar. However, as the strategic relevance of the town made it very important for the Monarchy, the Kings asked the Duke for the return of the town and its jurisdiction to the Crown property in 1501. This time, the Duke submitted to the royal request and ceded the town to the Crown. On December 22, 1501, the Queen issued a formal decree making the city and fortress acknowledge the Crown as their Lord. Therefore, the Marquessate of Gibraltar disappeared.

== Bibliography ==
- George Hills (1974). Rock of Contention. A History of Gibraltar. London: Robert Hale. pp. 100–103. ISBN 0-7091-4352-4.
- Isidro Sepúlveda (2004). Gibraltar, la razón y la fuerza (in Spanish). Madrid: Alianza. pp. 47–51. ISBN 84-206-4184-7.
- López de Ayala, Ignacio (1782). Historia de Gibraltar [History of Gibraltar] (in Spanish). Vol. 1. Madrid: Antonio de Sancha. pp. 204–208.
