= Castle of Tarifa =

- Castillo de Tarifa (Spanish)
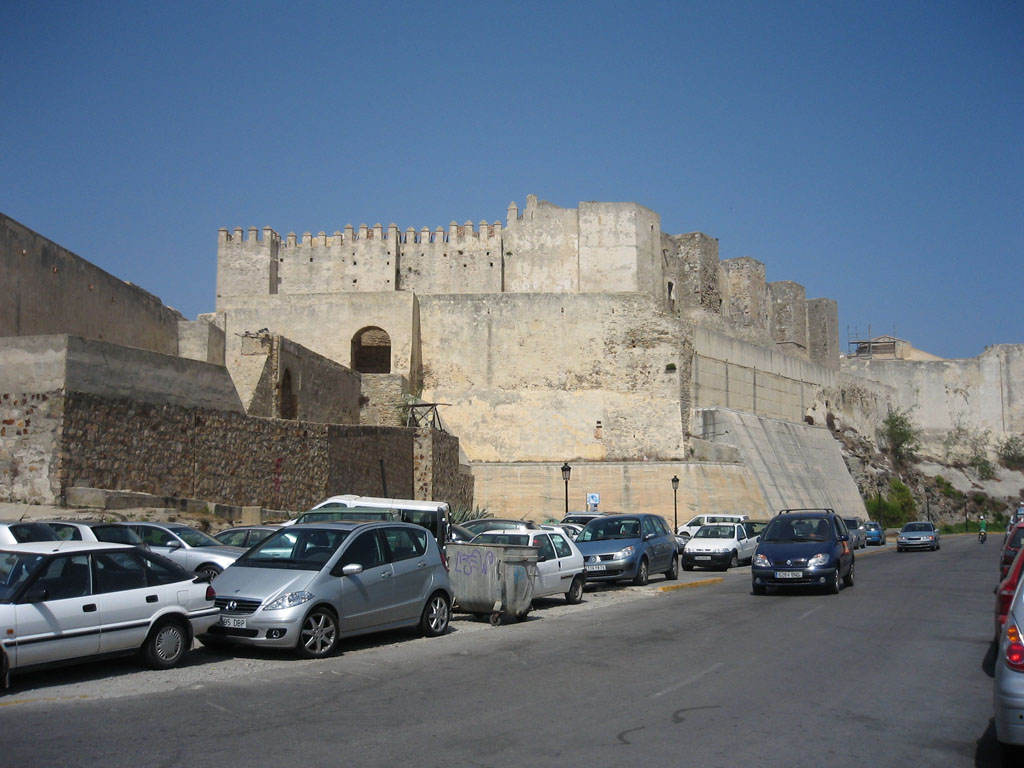
- Castle of Tarifa

- Location within Spain
- 36.0117°N 5.6027°W
- Location: Tarifa, Spain

Spanish Cultural Heritage
- Official name: Castillo de Tarifa
- Type: Caliphate of Córdoba
- Criteria: Monument
- Designated: 3 June 1931
- Reference no.: RI-51-0000499-00000

The Castle of Tarifa (Spanish: Castillo de Tarifa), also known as Castle of Guzmán el Bueno ("Good Guzmán", nickname of Alonso Pérez de Guzmán) or Castle of the Guzmáns (Alonso Pérez de Guzmán being the founder of the line from which the dukes of Medina Sidonia descend) is a castle in the coastal town of Tarifa in Spain.

== History ==
The castle was built in 960 by Abd-ar-Rahman III, Caliph of Córdoba. When Tarifa was taken over by the king of Castile Sancho IV in 1292, the castle was handed over to Alonso Pérez de Guzmán for its defense. Pérez de Guzmán got the nickname of "Good" (el Bueno) by refusing to hand over the castle in 1296 to the besieging forces of the Infante Don Juan, the rebellious brother of the king Sancho, and the Marinids, in exchange for the life of his son.

Recently refurbished, the castle is open to visitors. The coast and mountains of Morocco are visible from its towers.
