= Juan Alonso de Guzmán, 1st Duke of Medina Sidonia =

Spanish nobleman and military figure

Juan Alonso de Guzmán y Suárez de Figueroa Orozco, 1st Duke of Medina Sidonia and 3rd Count de Niebla (in full, Spanish: Don Juan Alonso de Guzmán y Suárez de Figueroa Orozco, primer Duque de Medina Sidonia, tercer Conde de Niebla, Señor de Sanlúcar de Barrameda, Señor de Lepe, Ayamonte y Gibraltar, Adelantado Mayor de la Frontera de Andalucía) (c. 1405 – December 1468) was a Spanish nobleman and military figure of the Reconquista.

== Biography ==
Juan Alonso de Guzmán was the son of Enrique de Guzmán, 2nd Count of Niebla, 5th Lord of Sanlúcar, and of Teresa Suárez de Figueroa y Orozco, Lady of Escamilla and Santa Olalla.

He fought in the Castilian Civil War of 1437–1445 on the side of King John II of Castile, against the Infantes of Aragon and their Castilian allies. He managed to keep control over the area of Seville, and to launch a counterattack that allowed the recovery of the enemy bases of Jerez, Acalá de Guadaira, Carmona and Córdoba. For this, he was awarded the title of Duke of Medina Sidonia by King John II of Castile on 17 February 1445.

In 1462, he played the leading role in the Reconquest of Gibraltar, which had been lost in 1411, and where his father had died in the failed diege of 1436.

Juan de Guzmán, 1st Duke of Medina Sidonia, died in December 1468 and was buried in the monastery of San Isidoro del Campo in Santiponce.

=== Marriage and children ===
He married Doña Maria de la Cerda y de Sarmiento, daughter of Luis de la Cerda y Mendoza, 3rd Count de Medinaceli. They had no children. He had however several illegitimate children :

- with Isabel de Menezes y Fonseca (also called Isabel de Meneses, c. 1420-1494), sister of Archbishop Alonso de Fonseca y Ulloa :
  - Enrique de Guzmán, who was legitimized when his father, shortly before dying, married Isabel de Meneses. Succeeded him in his house, as 2nd Duke of Medina Sidonia;
  - Álvaro de Guzmán, Lord of the Torre del Maestre, Monturque, la Palmosa and Alhocen, married to María Manuel de Figueroa.
- with Doña Elvira de Guzmán, daughter of Don Alvaro de Guzmán, 6th Señor de Orgáz:
  - Teresa Pérez de Guzmán y Guzmán, married Pedro de Zúñiga y Manrique de Lara.
- with his cousin Urraca de Guzmán el Bueno y Figueroa:
  - Juan Urraco de Guzmán "El Bueno", 4th señor de Lepe, military, married Leonor de Cárdenas, daughter of Alonso de Cárdenas;
  - Lorenzo Urraco de Guzmán el Bueno, a priest.
- with Catalina de Gálvez, daughter of the warden of Sanlúcar de Barrameda:
  - Fadrique de Guzmán, had issue;
  - Alfonso de Guzmán, died in battle in 1473, no issue;
  - Pedro de Guzmán, died in battle in 1473 together with his brother. Married to an other daughter of Alonso de Cárdenas, but left no descendants.

== Sources ==
- Sánchez Saus, Rafael. "Juan de Guzmán" (in Spanish). Real Academia de la Historia.
- Sánchez Saus, Rafael (1988). "Los señores de Ayamonte y Lepe: Guzmanes y Stúñigas en el siglo XV (1396-1454)". Huelva en su historia (2). Diputación Provincial de Huelva: Instituto de Estudios Onubenses: 171–172. ISSN 1136-6877.
- Valverde Fraikin, Jorge. (Granada, 1991) "Títulos Nobiliarios Andaluces", Editorial Andalucía, p. 80

Spanish nobility
New title	Duke of Medina Sidonia; 1445–1468	Succeeded by Enrique de Guzmán
Preceded by Enrique Pérez de Guzmán	Count of Niebla; 1436–1468	Succeeded by Enrique de Guzmán
