= Alfonso Pérez de Guzmán, 5th Duke of Medina Sidonia =

5th Duke of Medina Sidonia

Alfonso Pérez de Guzmán y de Guzmán-Zúñiga, 5th Duke of Medina Sidonia (1500-1549) was a Spanish noble from the 16th Century.

== Biography ==
He was the son of Juan Alfonso Pérez de Guzmán, 3rd Duke of Medina Sidonia and his second wife Leonor de Zúñiga y Guzmán. He became Duke of Medina Sidonia in 1513 when his half brother, Enrique Pérez de Guzmán, 4th Duke of Medina Sidonia died childless.

He married in December 1515 Ana de Aragón, illegitimate daughter of Alonso de Aragón, Archbishop of Zaragoza, the illegitimate son of Ferdinand II of Aragon. He was declared "impotent and stupid" ("mentecato", in 16th-century Spanish language) by King Charles I of Spain in 1518, and his marriage was annulled.

In the same year, his wife Ana de Aragón remarried his brother Juan Alfonso, who also assumed the title of 6th Duke of Medina Sidonia.

Spanish nobility
Preceded by Enrique Pérez de Guzmán	Duke of Medina Sidonia; 1513–1518	Succeeded by Juan Alfonso Pérez de Guzmán
