= Enrique Pérez de Guzmán, 2nd Count of Niebla =

Spanish nobleman and military figure

Enrique Pérez de Guzmán y de Castilla, 2nd Count of Niebla (in full, Spanish: Enrique Pérez de Guzmán y de Castilla, segundo conde de Niebla, señor de Sanlúcar de Barrameda) (20 February 1391 – 31 August 1436) was a Spanish nobleman and military figure of the Reconquista. He drowned while attempting the Seventh Siege of Gibraltar.

== Biography ==
He was the son of Juan Alonso de Guzmán and of Beatriz de Castilla y Ponce de León, Lady of Niebla (died 1409), an illegitimate daughter of Henry II of Castile and of Beatriz Ponce de León.

In 1418, he bought the Lordship of the Canary Islands from its conqueror Jean de Béthencourt.

In 1430, he transferred ownership of the Canary islands of El Hierro, Fuerteventura and Lanzarote to Hernan Peraza the Elder, who had the rights to the remaining, not yet conquered islands. This move helped Peraza to unify all islands the Lordship of the Canary Islands and strengthen the Peraza family's footing during the islands' conquest.

The count drowned while besieging Gibraltar on 31 August 1436. This was the Seventh Siege of Gibraltar then the isthmus was under the control of the Spanish Moors.

=== Marriage and children ===
On 4 March 1405 he married Teresa Suárez de Figueroa y Orozco, Lady of Escamilla and Santa Olalla, daughter of Lorenzo Suarez de Figueroa, Master of the Military Order of Santiago, and of Maria de Orozco. They had :

- Juan Alonso de Guzmán (c. 1405–1468), his successor and 1st Duke of Medina Sidonia
- María Teresa de Guzmán (1414-?), married Enrique Enríquez de Mendoza, 1st Count of Alba de Liste.

He married a second time in 1421 or 1422 to Yolande of Aragon, illegitimate daughter of Martin I of Sicily. This marriage produced no issue and was annulled.

He did have two children with Isabel de Mosquera, daughter of Arias de Mosquera y Moscoso, and probably married her in 1428.

- Alonso de Guzmán, 1st lord of the town of Torralba, married Catalina de Saavedra, daughter of Gonzalo Arias de Saavedra, 1st lord of Zahara and marshal of Castile
- Fadrique de Guzmán (d. ca. 1489), clergyman.

He also had two illegimate children :

- Beatriz de Guzmán, married Diego Enríquez de Noroña, illegitimate son of Alfonso Enríquez, Count of Gijón and Noreña
- Enrique de Guzmán, a clergyman.

== Sources ==
- "Enrique de Guzmán" (in Spanish). Real Academia de la Historia.

Spanish nobility
Preceded by Juan Alonso de Guzmán	Count of Niebla; 1396–1436	Succeeded by Juan Alonso de Guzmán
