= Enrique Pérez de Guzmán, 4th Duke of Medina Sidonia =

4th Duke of Medina Sidonia

Don Enrique Pérez de Guzmán y Fernández de Velasco, 4th Duke of Medina Sidonia (1494 - Osuna, 20 January 1513) was a Spanish noble from the 16th century.

== Biography ==
He was the son of Juan Alfonso Pérez de Guzmán, 3rd Duke of Medina Sidonia and Isabel de Velasco. He was Duke of Medina Sidonia from 1507, when his father died.

He married María Téllez Girón, daughter of Juan Téllez-Girón, 2nd Count of Ureña, but died soon after, aged 18.
They had no children. He was succeeded by his half-brother Alfonso.

Spanish nobility
Preceded by Juan Alfonso Pérez de Guzmán	Duke of Medina Sidonia; 1507–1512	Succeeded by Alfonso Pérez de Guzmán
