= Juan Alonso Pérez de Guzmán, 3rd Duke of Medina Sidonia =

3rd Duke of Medina Sidonia

Don Juan Alonso Pérez de Guzmán y Afán de Ribera, 3rd Duke of Medina Sidonia (February 1464 – 1507), 5th Count of Niebla, 8th Lord of Sanlúcar, 2nd Marquisate of Gibraltar and 1st Marquis of Cazaza, was a Spanish noble. He is best known for the Spanish Conquest of Tenerife (1494) and Melilla (1497), and for the Tenth siege of Gibraltar (1516).

== Biography ==
He was the only son of Enrique Pérez de Guzmán y Fonseca, 2nd Duke of Medina Sidonia, and Leonor de Mendoza, daughter of Per Afán de Ribera and María de Mendoza, herself daughter of the Marquis of Santillana.
His mother is known as Leonor de Mendoza y Ribera, although Juan Alonso had as second name "Afan de Ribera". This could be because his mother was a Mendoza, and it was not unknown for women and ecclesiastics to use the name of their mother, in spite of her father being an "Afan de Ribera".

He participated in the final episode of the Granada War alongside his father, who mobilized his troops at various stages of the conflict, to aid the Catholic Monarchs. In return for this service, the Monarchs granted him lordship over several towns in the Ronda mountains.

Aged 28, he inherited his father's titles in 1492.
In 1494, he provided financial support for the second expedition led by Alonso Fernández de Lugo to conquer Tenerife and placed an army of some 1,000 veterans from the Granada War at his disposal.

In 1497, he entirely financed the conquest of the then almost deserted city of Melilla, an undertaking the Crown had previously declined to pursue. The Duke placed Pedro de Estupiñán in command of the conquest and offered it to the Catholic Monarchs, thus incorporating it into the Crown of Castile. Nine years later, the Duke consolidated his victory with the capture of the neighboring fortress of Cazaza, and was rewarded for both services with the title of Marquis of Cazaza.

In January 1501, a conflict arose with the Crown, when Gibraltar, which had been given to his father in 1478, was transferred back to the Crown. His title of II Marquis of Gibraltar disappeared. During the power vacuum of 1506 after the death of Philip the Handsome, Juan Alfonso decided to forcibly re-assert his claim to Gibraltar and unsuccessfully besieged the city.

He then unexpectedly died in Seville from the plague of 1507, which he contracted when the plague already seemed to have ended.

=== Marriage and children ===
He married twice, being the father of the 4th, 5th and 6th Duke.
He first married his second cousin Isabel de Velasco (1465-1496), daughter of Pedro Fernández de Velasco, Constable of Castile. They had :

- Enrique Pérez de Guzmán, 4th Duke of Medina Sidonia (1494-1513), married, no issue
- Leonor Pérez de Guzmán, married Jaime I, Duke of Braganza, the most powerful noble in all of Portugal, and one of the most powerful nobles in all of Iberia.
- Mencía Pérez de Guzmán, married Pedro Téllez-Girón, 3rd Count of Ureña
- Isabel Pérez de Guzmán, Prioress of the Monastery of Santa Maria de la Piedad (Casalarreina)

His second marriage was to his first cousin Leonor de Zúñiga y Guzmán, daughter of Pedro de Zuñiga y Manrique de Lara.
Their children were:

- Alfonso Pérez de Guzmán, 5th Duke of Medina Sidonia (1500-1549), declared incapacitated in 1518
- Juan Alfonso Pérez de Guzmán, 6th Duke of Medina Sidonia (1502-1558), married with issue
- Pedro Pérez de Guzmán, 1st Count of Olivares (1503–1569), married with issue
- Leonor Pérez de Guzmán, married Diego Valencia Benavides, Marshal of Castile
- Félix Pérez de Guzmán.

Spanish nobility
| Preceded by Enrique de Guzmán | Duke of Medina Sidonia; 1492–1507 | Succeeded by Enrique Pérez de Guzmán |
