= Enrique Pérez de Guzmán y Fonseca, 2nd Duke of Medina Sidonia =

Don Enrique Pérez de Guzmán y Fonseca, 2nd Duke of Medina Sidonia (died 1492), became the second Duke in 1468. He was also 4th Count of Niebla and 7th Lord of Sanlúcar.

== Biography ==
Born out of wedlock, his birth was later legitimised by the "Reyes Católicos" Ferdinand and Isabella, and consequently he obtained the right to inherit the title from his father, Juan Alonso de Guzmán. He participated in the War of the Castilian Succession and the Conquest of the Emirate of Granada, and was granted in 1478 the title of Marquis of Gibraltar.

In those days, according to historian Salvador de Madariaga, he was considered the wealthiest man in Spain.

=== Marriage and children ===
Enrique de Guzmán married in 1463 Leonor de Ribera y Mendoza, Lady of Olivares, daughter of the 3rd Adelantado of Andalusia, Per Afán de Ribera, and his second wife María de Mendoza, 1st Countess of los Molares. A son was born from this marriage:

- Juan Alonso Pérez de Guzmán (1464-1507), 3rd Duke of Medina Sidonia, 2nd Marquis of Gibraltar, 1st Marquis of Cazaza, 8th Lord of Sanlúcar de Barrameda.

Spanish nobility
| Preceded by Juan Alonso de Guzmán | Duke of Medina Sidonia; 1468–1492 | Succeeded by Juan Alfonso Pérez de Guzmán |
