= Niebla, Spain =

Coordinates: 37°22′N 6°41′W

Niebla
- Town and Municipality
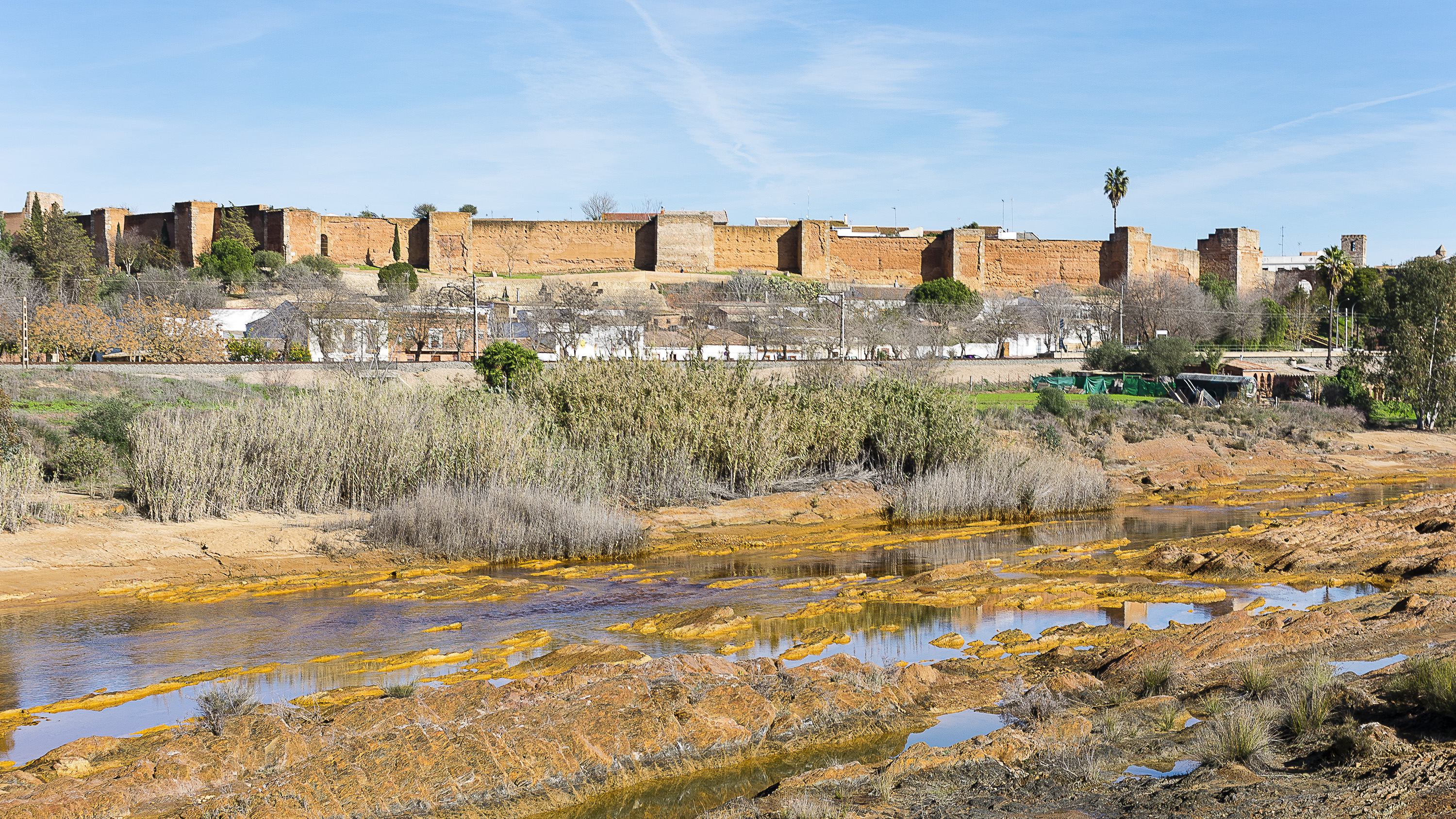

- Flag Coat of arms

- Location in Spain.
- Country: Spain
- Autonomous community: Andalusia
- Province: Huelva

Area
  - Total: 223.62 km^{2} (86.34 sq mi)
- Elevation: 45 m (148 ft)

Population (2025-01-01)
  - Total: 4,268
  - Density: 19.09/km^{2} (49.43/sq mi)
- Time zone: UTC+1 (CET)
  - Summer (DST): UTC+2 (CEST)
- Website: http://www.niebla.es/es/

Niebla is a town and municipality located in the province of Huelva, in Andalusia, southern Spain. It lies on the banks of the Rio Tinto, 30 km from Huelva and 60 km from Seville. According to the 2025 municipal register, it has a population of 4,268 inhabitants. A 2-km town wall surrounds the perimeter of the town.

The municipality has a long historical tradition, a fact favored by its geographical location. During the Caliphate of Córdoba, it was the capital of the Cora of the same name, and during taifa period, it was the center of the Taifa of Niebla. The castle dates mostly from the 15th century. Just outside the town a Roman bridge, still in use today, crosses the Rio Tinto.

== History ==
Niebla's history dates back 3,000 years. The town's early importance was due to the silver industry, exploited by Phoenician traders by the 8th century B.C. The town was a commercial and political centre known as Ilipla in Roman times.

By 713 the town of Ilipla was under Muslim control. The town became part of the emirate of Cordoba in 756 and further fortifications were constructed. From 1023 Niebla became the capital of the Taifa of Niebla, whose army fought the Taifa of Seville. The battle was lost and Niebla fell under the control of Seville in 1053. Islamic rule began to weaken after 1212, and the town was conquered in 1262 by Alfonso X of Castile. Descriptions of the siege suggest that this town was the place where gunpowder was first used in Spain.

During the last third of the 19th century, the railway arrived in the municipality. In 1875, the Riotinto Railway entered service, linking Huelva with the Riotinto-Nerva mining basin and had its own station in the municipality of Niebla. Five years later, the Seville-Huelva line was put into service, which also had its own station in Niebla. Furthermore, in 1896, a connecting station was installed in the Las Mallas area to allow freight exchanges between trains on the Riotinto and Seville-Huelva lines. Railway activity remained very active until the closure of the Riotinto line in 1984.

In 1982, the historic center of Niebla was declared Conjunto Monumental Histórico-Artístico.

== Ecclesiastical history ==
Niebla has once been a Catholic bishopric, suffragan of the Metropolitan Archdiocese of Sevilla in the Visigothic Kingdom, founded probably around 400. It survived the Muslim conquest of Iberia, until the arrival of the most intolerant Almohads in the 12th century, when its last (name lost) bishop fled to Seville.

Its former territory is now entirely comprised in the Diocese of Huelva.

Suffragan Bishops of Elepla/Niebla
incomplete

- Vincomalos (466–509)
- Basilio (circa 585 – 590)
- Juan (John) (mentioned between 633 and 646)
- Servando (between 653 and 656)
- Geta (between 681 and 688)
- Pápulo (in 693)
- (anonymous) (?–1154)

=== Titular see ===
In 1969 the diocese was nominally restored as Latin Titular bishopric under the names of Elepla (also Curiate Italian) / Eleplen(sis) (Latin adjective).

It has had the following incumbents, so far of the fitting Episcopal (lowest) rank :

- Luis Almarcha Hernández (1970.04.04 – resigned 1970.12.11) on emeritate as former Bishop of León (Spain) (1944.07.10 – retired 1970.04.04), died 1974
- Ciro Alfonso Gómez Serrano (1972.07.24 – 1975.10.25) as Coadjutor Bishop of Socorro y San Gil (Colombia) (1972.07.24 – 1975.10.25), later succeeding as Bishop of Socorro y San Gil (1975.10.25 – death 1980.01.19); previously Bishop of Girardot (Colombia) (1961.04.08 – 1972.07.24)
- Pablo Ervin Schmitz Simon, Capuchin Franciscans (O.F.M. Cap.) (1984.06.22 – ...), first as Auxiliary Bishop of Bluefields (Nicaragua) (1984.06.22 – 1994.07.28), then having succeeded as Apostolic Vicar of Bluefields.

== See also ==
- List of Catholic dioceses in Spain, Andorra, Ceuta and Gibraltar
- List of municipalities in Huelva

== Bibliography ==
- Arenas Posadas, Carlos (1999). Empresa, mercados, mina y mineros. Río Tinto, 1873-1936 (PDF) (in Spanish). Universidad de Huelva.
- Flores Caballero, Manuel (2011). Las fuerzas de la revolución industrial en la fiebre minera del XIX. Editorial Fundación para la investigación Juan Manuel Flores Jimeno. ISBN 9788493768782.
- Mojarro Bayo, Ana María (2010). La historia del puerto de Huelva (1873-1930) (in Spanish). Servicio de publicaciones de la Universidad de Huelva/Puerto de Huelva. ISBN 978-84-16621-15-6.

== Sources and external links ==
Media related to Niebla, Spain at Wikimedia Commons

- Niebla - Sistema de Información Multiterritorial de Andalucía
- GCatholic - Elepla (titular) bishopric
