= List of sieges of Gibraltar =

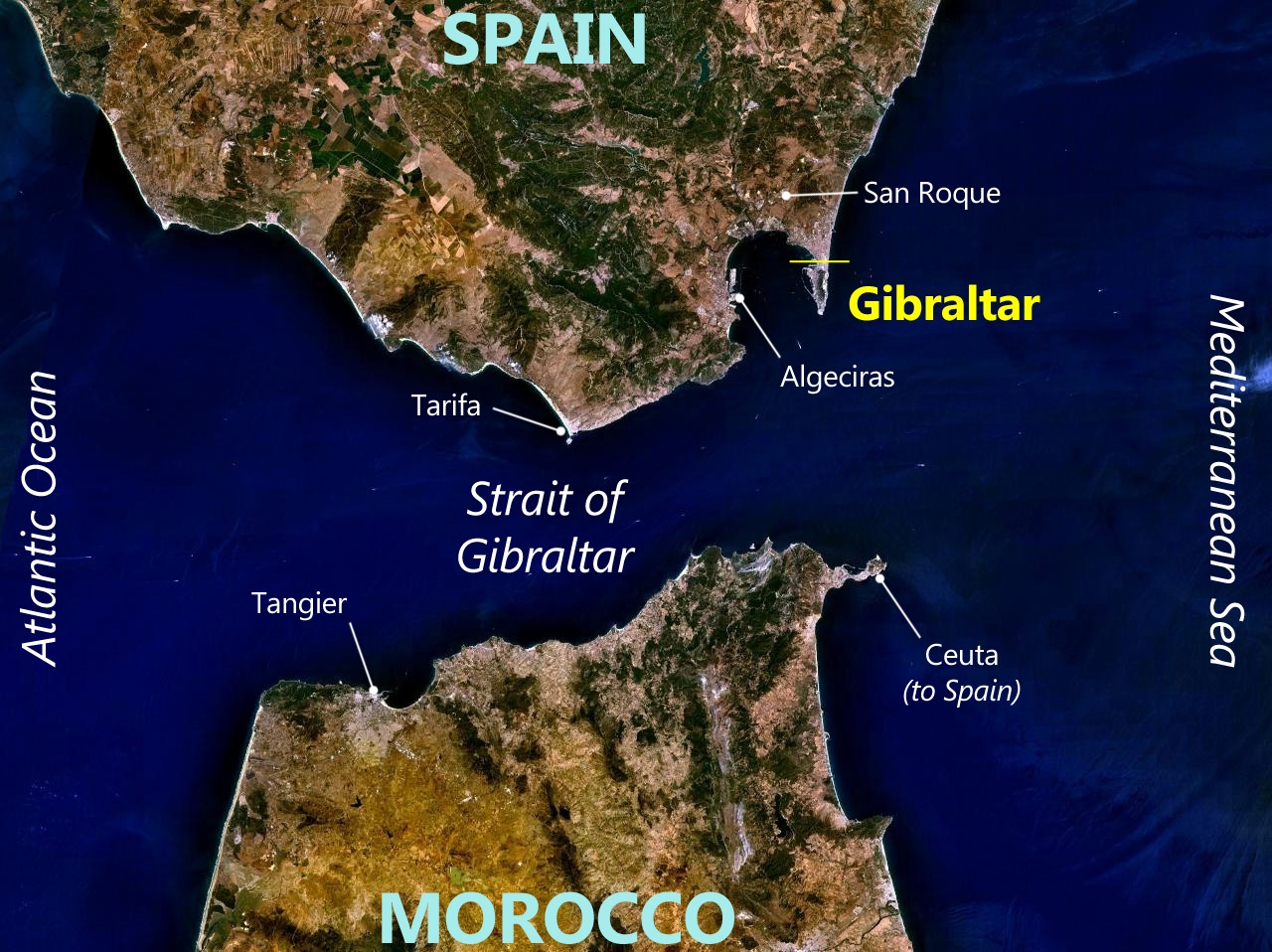
Satellite view of the Strait of Gibraltar showing the Rock's location in comparison to several other settlements that have featured in its history

There have been fourteen recorded sieges of Gibraltar. Although the peninsula of Gibraltar is only 6 kilometres (3.7 mi) long and 1 kilometre (0.62 mi) wide, it occupies an extremely strategic location on the southern Iberian coast at the western entrance to the Mediterranean Sea. Its position just across the eponymous Strait from Morocco in North Africa, as well as its natural defensibility, have made it one of the most fought-over places in Europe.

Only five of the sieges resulted in a change of rule. Seven were fought between Muslims and Catholics during Muslim rule, four between Spain and Britain from the Anglo-Dutch capture in 1704 to the end of the Great Siege in 1783, two between rival Catholic factions, and one between rival Muslim powers. Four of Gibraltar's changes in rule, including three sieges, took place over a matter of days or hours, whereas several other sieges had durations of months or years and claimed the lives of thousands without resulting in any change in rule.

== Background ==
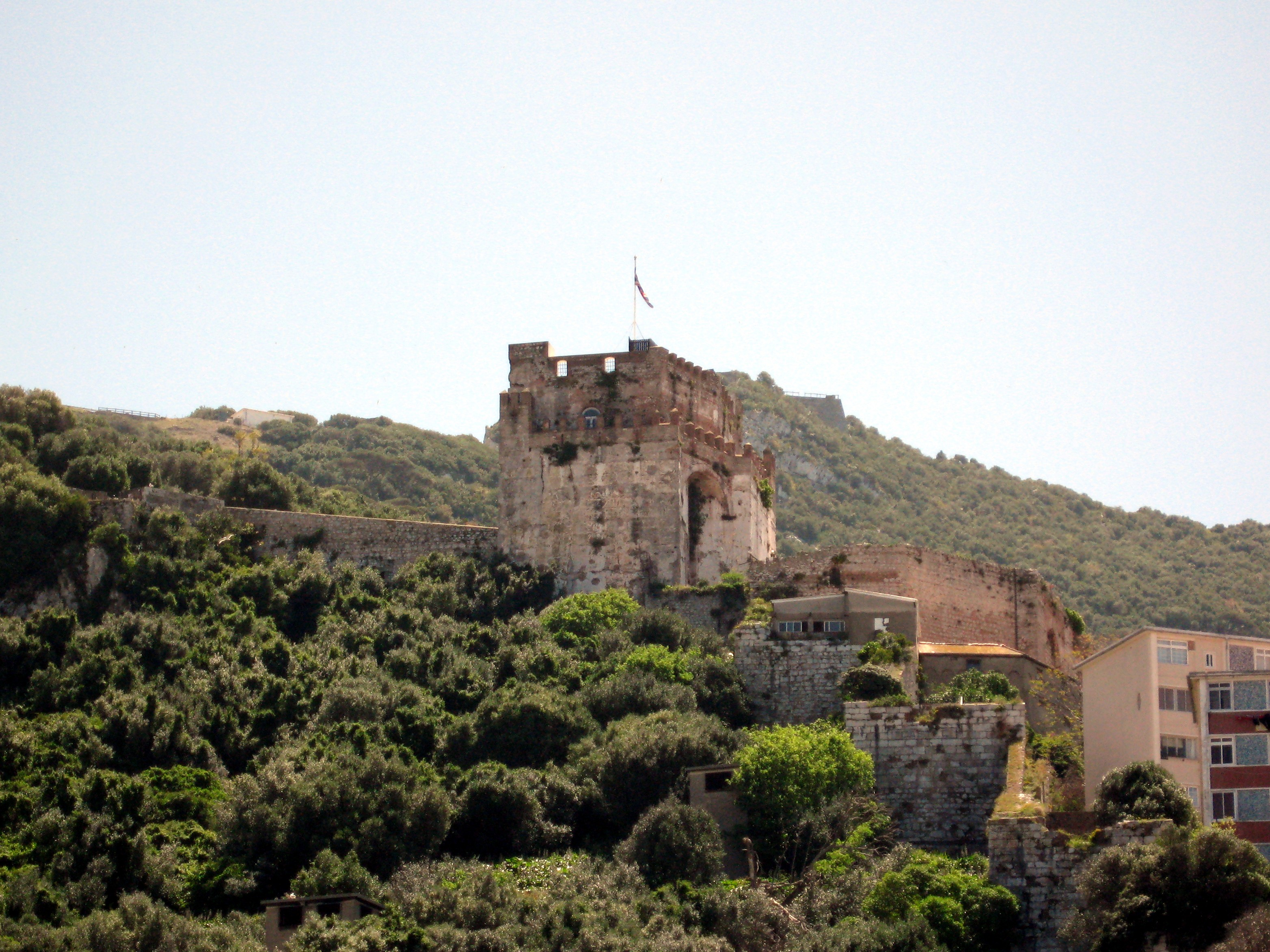
Gibraltar's Moorish Castle, the scene of many of the earlier sieges

Gibraltar is a British territory and mountainous peninsula on the far southern coast of the Iberian peninsula, at one of the narrowest points in the Mediterranean, only 15 miles (24 km) from the coast of Morocco in North Africa. It is dominated by the steeply sloping Rock of Gibraltar, 426 metres (1,398 ft) high. A narrow, low-lying isthmus connects the peninsula to the Spanish mainland. High coastal cliffs and a rocky shoreline make it virtually impossible to attack from the east or south. The west side – occupied by the town of Gibraltar, which stands at the base of the Rock – and the northern approach across the isthmus have been densely fortified by its various occupants with numerous walls, towers and gun batteries. The geography of the peninsula provides considerable natural defensive advantages, which combined with its location have imbued Gibraltar with enormous military significance over the centuries.

The first documented invasion of Gibraltar was by the Moors, Muslim Arabs and Berbers who arrived from North Africa at the beginning of the eighth century. They used the area as a base from which to launch an invasion of the rest of the Iberian Peninsula which resulted in most of Iberia coming under Moorish rule. The Spanish Reconquista began later in the eighth century. The campaign eventually took 800 years to force the Moors back across the Strait, and did not reach the Bay of Gibraltar until the fourteenth century. It was not until 1309, nearly 600 years after Gibraltar was first settled, that the first siege of Gibraltar was recorded. King Ferdinand I of Castile began a siege of Algeciras on the other side of the bay in July, but his naval blockade was unable to stop supplies being smuggled in small boats from Gibraltar to the besieged city. He sent an army under Alonso Pérez de Guzmán to take Gibraltar. De Guzmán succeeded after a month-long siege, and Gibraltar was settled by the Castilians for the first time. Six years later, the Moors attempted to retake the peninsula in the brief second siege which was abandoned at the sight of a Castilian relief force. Another Moorish attempt eventually succeeded in the third siege of February–June 1333. A Castilian attempt to retake it in the fourth siege of June–August 1333 failed, as did the fifth siege of 1349–50, in which King Alfonso XI of Castile died in an outbreak of bubonic plague among the besiegers. The Moors of Granada and Fez fell out with each other over Gibraltar in 1411, leading to the Granadans besieging the fortified town in the sixth siege and seizing it from the Marinids of Fez. Enrique Pérez de Guzmán, 2nd Count de Niebla made a failed attempt to capture Gibraltar in the seventh siege of 1436, during which he perished.

The Moorish presence in Gibraltar ended in 1462, when Enrique's son Juan Alonso de Guzmán, 1st Duke of Medina Sidonia captured it after the eighth siege. What followed was a bitter dispute over the rights to the fortress. The Duke of Medina Sidonia claimed Gibraltar as his own, making a mortal enemy of Juan Ponce de León, Count of Arcos, but Henry IV of Castile declared it crown property shortly afterwards and so began a civil war. Henry was deposed in effigy in 1465 by a council of nobles who proclaimed as king his half-brother Alfonso. Gibraltar's ninth siege took place after Medina Sidonia persuaded Alfonso to grant him the fortress, following which the Duke sent an army to storm the town. Henry's governor held out for fifteen months before finally surrendering in July 1467. Medina Sidonia's grandson, the third duke Juan Alfonso Pérez de Guzmán, was responsible for Gibraltar's tenth siege (and, as it happened, its last for 200 years). Queen Isabella I again declared Gibraltar crown property in 1501, but her death three years later left Castile in turmoil, prompting Medina Sidonia to take advantage of the kingdom's weakness. He assembled an army and marched on Gibraltar in the hope that the city would simply open its gates to him, but it did not, forcing him to lay siege to it instead; he abandoned the attempt after three months.

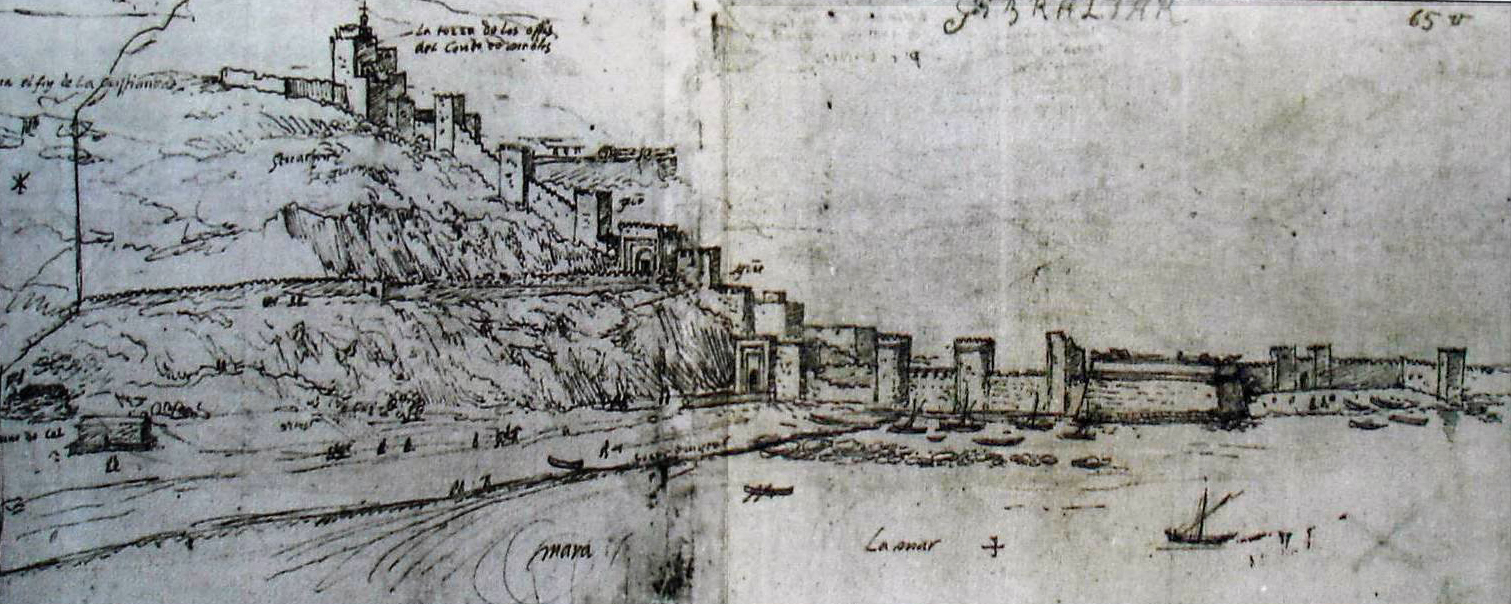
The heavily fortified northern approach to Gibraltar as seen in 1567; the view would have been substantially the same in 1704

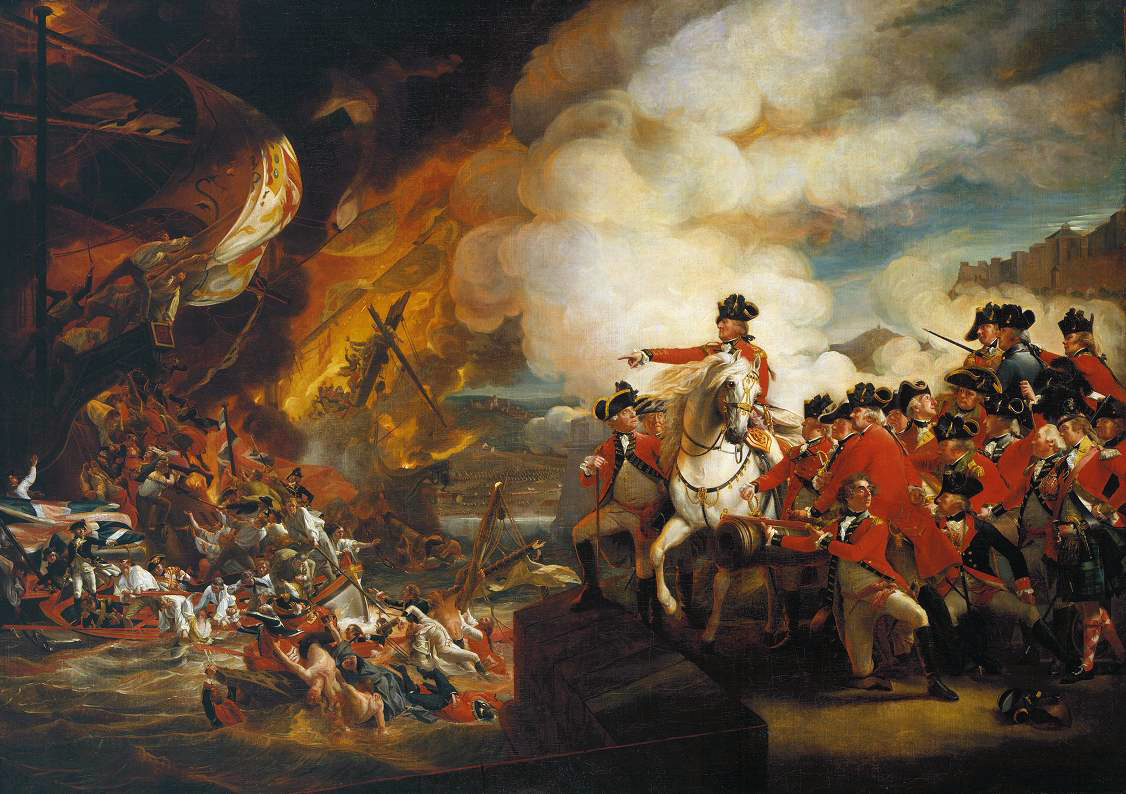
The Defeat of the Floating Batteries at Gibraltar, September 1782—a painting by John Singleton Copley of the Great Siege of Gibraltar

Gibraltar lived in relative peace for over 200 years after the tenth siege, by which time the Reconquista was completed and Spain was unified under a single crown. The Rock's importance as a fortress diminished and its defences were neglected. The next siege came in 1704, during the War of the Spanish Succession. The Confederate nations (led by England and the Dutch Republic in opposition to the Bourbons of the Spanish and French thrones) were seeking to gain a foothold in the Mediterranean, largely to distract the attentions of the Franco-Spanish Bourbon dynasty from a land campaign in northern Europe. Gibraltar was chosen as the target after unsuccessful attempts on other ports. The Confederates attacked on 1 August 1704 and the Spanish governor Diego de Salinas surrendered after the eleventh siege, which only lasted three days. Within a few weeks, Spanish forces began assembling to the north of Gibraltar (now La Línea de la Concepción) for an attempt to re-take the fortress. After the twelfth siege, which comprised a six-month bombardment and blockade from the isthmus linking Gibraltar to the mainland, the garrison was no closer to surrendering and the Franco-Spanish army abandoned the siege. The War of the Spanish Succession formally ended in 1713 with the signing of the Treaty of Utrecht, under which Gibraltar was ceded to Great Britain. It was initially assumed that Britain would not permanently retain Gibraltar, and would eventually trade it for something else, but the strength of British public opinion made it politically impossible to use the territory as a bargaining chip. Spain, meanwhile, felt betrayed by the French, who had negotiated the Treaty of Utrecht unilaterally, and was determined to regain Gibraltar. The issue came to a head in 1727 when King Philip V of Spain claimed that the British had voided Article X of the treaty, under which Gibraltar had been ceded, due to failures to adhere to its conditions. Philip's forces began the thirteenth siege from the isthmus on 22 February, but after four months, the Spanish supply chain could not keep up with the demands of the siege and, lacking a navy, Spain was unable to prevent Britain from resupplying the garrison by sea.

In the years following the thirteenth siege, tensions began to resurface between Britain and France, and Spain remained neutral in a series of wars waged over the two nations' rival ambitions. The Treaty of Utrecht was reaffirmed by a succession of treaties, but Spain remained determined to regain the territory she had lost. In addition to her struggles with France, Britain also struggled with her North American colonies, which culminated in the American War of Independence that began in 1775; four years later, Spain declared war on Britain, primarily in an attempt to win back Gibraltar. Spain broke off communications with Gibraltar in June, beginning the fourteenth and final siege—the "Great Siege of Gibraltar"—although the first shot of the siege was not fired until 12 September. Throughout the siege, the Spanish attempted to starve the garrison into submission by blockading the isthmus and bribing the Sultan of Morocco into cutting off supplies while bombarding the town and its fortifications. The Great Siege was noteworthy for the efforts of engineers on both sides to gain advantage through the adoption of novel technologies, such as the Spanish floating batteries and the British depressing carriages to allow cannon to fire downward from the Rock of Gibraltar. The siege ended in a humiliating failure for Spain, as all attempts made on Gibraltar were repulsed with 6,000 killed and all floating batteries destroyed. Britain retained Gibraltar but ceded East and West Florida and Menorca.

Gibraltar played an important role in the Napoleonic Wars in the late eighteenth and early nineteenth centuries and in many later conflicts. Hitler drew up plans to besiege Gibraltar during the Second World War (Operation Felix), but the plans were never implemented and the Great Siege was the last military siege of Gibraltar. Some historians discuss the closure of the Gibraltar–Spain border (part of an attempt by Spain to coerce the United Kingdom into ceding Gibraltar) from 1969 to 1985 as a "fifteenth siege"; as this differs from the other fourteen sieges in that it was not a conflict between opposing militaries, it is not included in this list.

== List of sieges ==
Sieges of Gibraltar
| Name | Start date | End date | Description of dispute | Result |
|---|---|---|---|---|
| First siege of Gibraltar | August 1309 | 12 September 1309 | The first siege of Gibraltar lasted just over a month, ending on 12 September 1309. King Ferdinand IV of Castile began a campaign on 27 July 1309 against Algeciras on the opposite side of the Bay of Gibraltar, but was frustrated by the Moors of Gibraltar, who smuggled supplies to Algeciras under the cover of darkness. Ferdinand ordered Alonso Pérez de Guzmán to attack Gibraltar. Guzmán attacked from the north and south simultaneously. When his men reached the top of the Rock, they set up catapults and began bombarding the town with rocks. The bombardment inflicted severe damage but failed to force the Moors out and a siege ensued, which was only broken when Ferdinand offered the Moors free passage back to Africa in exchange for their surrender of Gibraltar. | Moors surrender Gibraltar to Castile |
| Second siege of Gibraltar | 1315 | 1315 | Exact dates unknown. A short-lived, unsuccessful attempt by the Moors to recapture Gibraltar six years after the first siege. The attempt was abandoned when Castilian naval and land forces approached Gibraltar to relieve it. | Abandoned, Castile retains control |
| Third siege of Gibraltar | February 1333 | 17 June 1333 | An attempt by Abd al-Malik, allied with Muhammed IV, Sultan of Granada, to recapture Gibraltar from the Castilians. The attack was preceded by a series of distraction campaigns waged by the Moors and Granadans in Castilian territory, which limited the ability of the Castilians to defend Gibraltar. The Moorish army—of approximately 7,000 men, who had been assembled in secret—laid siege to Gibraltar in February 1333, taking King Alfonso XI of Castile by surprise. Alfonso was unable to respond quickly due to the distraction campaigns, rebellion in central and northern Castile, and a lack of funds. He initially sent a flotilla of 21 vessels to assist, but without a supporting army, it could do little to break the siege. It took Alfonso four months to raise the funds to send an army to relieve Gibraltar, but the force only reached the Guadalete River before the governor, Don Vasco Perez de Meira, surrendered to the Moors. The governor escaped to Africa, and was widely considered a traitor for misappropriating funds intended for strengthening the town's defences, as well as for hoarding food supplies during the siege. | Castilians surrender to Moors |
| Fourth siege of Gibraltar | 26 June 1333 | August 1333 | In an attempt to make amends for his loss of Gibraltar earlier that month, Alfonso XI—feeling personal responsibility—attempted a counter-attack in late June 1333, before the Moors had chance to re-organise the city's defences. Alfonso attempted an amphibious assault, landing troops on the less fortified southern side of Gibraltar, but his commanders and troops were ill-disciplined. A large force rushed the Moorish Castle without waiting for reinforcements and were quickly outmanoeuvred. Many were killed and approximately 1,500 became stranded on the Upper Rock. Alfonso began to retreat, unable to bring in resupply ships due to the wind conditions. Accounts differ as to why, but Alfonso reversed his retreat a few miles in and decided to make a second attempt at an amphibious assault. The second operation succeeded in rescuing the men trapped on the Upper Rock, but attempts to storm the castle failed and the two parties settled into a siege. Muhammed IV of Granada attempted to relieve Gibraltar, but Alfonso withdrew his forces behind a defensive ditch in the isthmus to the north of the Rock before Muhammed's army arrived. By August, Alfonso's army was itself effectively besieged and both sides were suffering, so the Moors offered a four-year truce, which Alfonso accepted. | Moors retain control |
| Fifth siege of Gibraltar | 24 August 1349 | 27 March 1350 | After the end of the siege of Algeciras in 1344, Gibraltar was left as the most southerly point of Moorish Spain, making it a tempting target for the Christian rulers of the remainder of the Iberian Peninsula. A ten-year truce had been negotiated in return for the Moors' surrender of Algeciras, but the truce was broken after Abu Inan Faris overthrew his father in 1348. Alfonso XI, having failed to recapture the rock in his two prior sieges, marched on Gibraltar in August 1349, bringing with him six siege engines, and quickly settled down for a long siege. He built a large camp on the isthmus north of the town and brought his mistress and their illegitimate children to stay with him. The siege continued through the winter, and in February 1350, the Black Death broke out in Alfonso's camp. Alfonso's generals and the nobles and ladies with him in the camp begged him to lift the siege, but Alfonso vowed that he would not leave until Gibraltar was back in Christian hands. The king eventually caught the plague and he died on 27 March 1350 (Good Friday). The siege immediately ended with Alfonso's death. By that time, Yusuf I of Granada had almost reached Gibraltar with a relieving army, but he halted and allowed the Christian party to withdraw and return to Seville with the body of their king. | Abandoned, Moors retain control |
| Sixth siege of Gibraltar | 1411 | 1411 | After the death of Alfonso XI at the fifth siege, Castilian ambitions of reconquering Gibraltar gave way to civil war, allowing tensions between Granada and Fez to surface. In 1374, the Moors of Fez ceded Gibraltar to the Granadan Moors, apparently in exchange for the latter's assistance with rebellions in Morocco. The garrison of Gibraltar revolted against Granada in 1410 and declared allegiance to Abu Said Uthman III of Fez, who also occupied much of the surrounding area. The following year, Granada launched a counter-offensive aimed at re-conquering the territory it had lost to Fez and succeeded in pushing the Moroccan Moors back as far as Gibraltar. There, they initiated a siege—the only one of Gibraltar's sieges to be contested between two Muslim powers. The Granadans repulsed several attempts to break out of the town before entering it and storming the Moorish Castle with clandestine help from inside. The garrison was forced to surrender and Gibraltar reverted to Granadan rule. | Granada gains control from Fez |
| Seventh siege of Gibraltar | August 1436 | 31 August 1436 | Throughout the Moorish rule of Gibraltar, the town was used as a base for bandit raids into Castilian territory. In 1436, Enrique Pérez de Guzmán, 2nd Count de Niebla (grandson of Alonso Pérez de Guzmán, who captured Gibraltar after the first siege) assembled a force of five thousand men with which he intended to storm Gibraltar and dismantle the raiders' base. He put his son, Juan Alonso de Guzmán, 1st Duke of Medina Sidonia in command of an army which marched from Tarifa to blockade the isthmus, while he led a fleet to land men on the beach. When Enrique arrived, he found the town's defences significantly stronger than he had anticipated – in particular, the sea wall had been extended since earlier sieges to prevent access to the Upper Rock from the beach. When his men landed, they found themselves caught between the tide and the sea wall, while the defending forces bombarded them with missiles. Enrique ordered his forces to withdraw, but was drowned when his boat capsized after several stranded men attempted to board it. Lacking the funds for an extended siege, Juan marched his army away, while the Moors recovered his father's body, decapitated it, and hung it in a basket above the town walls. | Moors retain control |
| Eighth siege of Gibraltar | August 1462 | 20 August 1462 | In August 1462, an inhabitant of then-Muslim Gibraltar defected to Tarifa, where he converted to Christianity. He informed the Governor of Tarifa, Alonso de Arcos that Gibraltar was largely undefended. A sceptical Alonso took a relatively small force to Gibraltar to attempt to verify the defector's claims. Upon arrival, Alonso's men took up concealed positions from which they could observe the town. They captured a Moorish patrol and tortured them for information, which confirmed the defector's claims. Lacking sufficient men to hold the town even if he managed to capture it, Alonso sent for reinforcements from nearby Christian towns and from Juan Alonso de Guzmán, 1st Duke of Medina Sidonia (who blockaded the isthmus in the seventh siege and whose father's body still hung above the town walls). After contingents arrived from local towns, Alonso launched an assault, which resulted in two days of heavy fighting, after which the Moors sent an emissary to offer terms for surrender. However, Alonso did not have the authority to accept the surrender, and had to await the arrival of a more senior noble. A contingent from Arcos stormed the town after the Jerez contingent attempted to accept the Moors' surrender, prompting the town's inhabitants to retreat inside the castle walls. With Gibraltar in Christian hands, a dispute broke out between the de Guzmáns and the Ponce de Leons over which family's standard would be raised above the castle. The Ponce de Leons' men withdrew when they believed the de Guzmáns had set a trap for them, leaving the Rock under the control of the de Guzmáns and the two families mortal enemies. | De Guzmán family captures Gibraltar |
| Ninth siege of Gibraltar | April 1466 | 26 July 1467 | At the end of the eighth siege, Juan Alonso de Guzmán took control of Gibraltar after a bitter dispute with Alonso Ponce de Leon, but shortly after, King Henry IV of Castile declared Gibraltar crown property, likely at the behest of the Ponce de Leons. When the Castilian nobles and clergy deposed Henry and declared his half brother Alfonso king, Juan quickly pledged his loyalty to Alfonso in return for a royal warrant granting Gibraltar to the house of de Guzmán, and Juan launched the ninth siege. The governor of Gibraltar almost immediately retreated into the Moorish Castle, which Juan blockaded in the expectation that the governor would shortly surrender. Ten months later, however, the governor was still barricaded inside the castle, so Juan brought in cannon to breach the walls and stormed the castle, forcing the defenders to retreat to the Tower of Homage (the innermost chamber of the castle). The defenders remained inside the tower hoping for rescue, but finally surrendered when none came after a further five months. | De Guzmán family resumes control |
| Tenth siege of Gibraltar | September 1506 | December 1506/January 1507 | In 1501, Queen Isabella I of Castile, during her continuation of the Reconquista, decided that Gibraltar was too important to be left in private hands. She decreed it crown property—as her predecessor, Henry IV, had done around 40 years earlier—though apparently without resistance from house of de Guzmán. After Isabella's death in 1504 left her kingdom in turmoil, Juan Alfonso Pérez de Guzmán, 3rd Duke of Medina Sidonia decided to exploit the instability and gathered an army to march on Gibraltar. He hoped that the city would simply open its gates to him, but it did not, and so began an unenthusiastic siege. After four months, the Archbishop of Seville persuaded the duke that it was dishonourable to continue the siege against the will of the inhabitants of Gibraltar, and the duke marched his army away, both sides having suffered minimal losses. Gibraltar was later awarded the title of "most loyal". | Abandoned, Castilian crown retains control |
| Eleventh siege (the "capture of Gibraltar") | 1 August 1704 | 3 August 1704 | Almost 200 years after the previous siege, and 240 years after the Spanish captured Gibraltar from the Moors, the eleventh siege arose from the War of the Spanish Succession, in which several European powers, led by England and the Dutch Republic, joined forces against France in 1702 to prevent the unification of the Spanish and French thrones. The allies sought a base from which they could control the Straits of Gibraltar. After unsuccessful attempts on several other ports, including Cadiz in 1702, the allied fleet commanded by Admiral George Rooke decided to take Gibraltar. The siege began on 1 August 1704 when the allies landed around 2,000 marines on the isthmus, cutting Gibraltar off from mainland Spain. The next day, Rooke ordered a squadron of vessels to form a line from Old Mole to New Mole along the west coast of the Rock. Early on 3 August, they began bombarding Gibraltar's fortifications. The bombardment lasted around six hours, after which a landing party attempted to storm the New Mole (which exploded as they did so, possibly because of English carelessness or a Spanish trap). The survivors eventually managed to proceed along the sea wall to Europa Point until a truce was agreed, allowing the governor until the next morning to agree with the city council to surrender, which they did at dawn on 4 August. | Confederates capture Gibraltar |
| Twelfth siege of Gibraltar | 3 September 1704 | 31 March 1705 | After the capture of Gibraltar, the allies expected a counter-offensive, and in early September, it began. Francisco Castillo Fajardo, Marquis of Villadarias, captain general of Andalusia, marched to the isthmus with an army of 4,000 men. There he set up camp just out of cannon range from Gibraltar while he awaited reinforcements. The marquis had gathered around 7,000 men by late October and planned to build his force to 12,000 before launching an assault. Prince George of Hesse-Darmstadt, who had taken control of Gibraltar after its capture, re-formed the defences around the Rock and organised the 2,000 English and Dutch marines under his command to hold vulnerable areas with relatively few men, which could be reinforced by a reserve force. Nevertheless, he feared his forces would not be able to withstand a simultaneous assault from land and sea such as the one that had brought him to Gibraltar. On 4 October, these fears appeared to be realised when several French troop ships, escorted by 19 warships, arrived in the Bay of Gibraltar and disembarked 3,000 soldiers at the head of the bay. The soldiers joined the marquis's men on the isthmus and, three weeks later, most of the French fleet departed; two days after that (26 October), the Spanish forces established their first battery and began firing on George's most northerly defences while a French raiding party attacked the harbour. Both parties settled down into the siege for the winter; the Spanish bombardment continued and the English and Dutch brought in reinforcements through December and January. After desertion and disease reduced the strength of the Spanish force, King Louis XIV of France sent Marshal René de Froulay de Tessé to take command of the siege, along with 4,500 French and Irish reinforcements. On 7 February 1705, 1,000 Spaniards and 500 of the French and Irish reinforcements stormed the Round Tower, but suffered heavy losses in an Anglo-Dutch counter-attack. After the French fleet suffered a defeat at the hands of Admiral Sir John Leake at the end of March, the Catholic force began to withdraw and eventually abandoned the siege. | Confederates retain control |
| Thirteenth siege of Gibraltar | 22 February 1727 | 23 June 1727 | In the words of the anonymous author of the Impartial Account of the Siege, the thirteenth siege "made rather more noise in the world in preparation than when undertaken". The War of the Spanish Succession ended with the signing of the Treaty of Utrecht in 1713, Article X of which formally ceded Gibraltar to Great Britain (as it became with the passing of the Act of Union in 1707). King Philip V of Spain felt that he had been forced by Louis XIV to sign the treaty, and the Spanish were determined to regain Gibraltar. In January 1727, Philip claimed that Article X was null and void, citing several alleged violations of its terms by the British. The Marquis de las Torres began assembling an army, supported by contingents from across Catholic Europe, to attack Gibraltar; in response, the British began reinforcing the garrison. The thirteenth siege began on 22 February when the British fired on a party of Spanish workers in the neutral territory north of the Rock; from then on, the Spanish attempted to build batteries on the isthmus with which to bombard British batteries and the city walls, while the British attempted to halt Spanish progress. By 24 March, the Spanish had established batteries within range of the British defences and began a ten-day bombardment, inflicting considerable damage which the British struggled to repair. The Spanish pace was reduced by bad weather, which began in early April; it was not until 7 May that the bombardment began again in earnest. By 20 May, the Spanish supply chain could not keep up with the demands of the bombardment while the British were almost constantly able to resupply by sea. The Spanish offered a truce on 23 June, which was signed the next day. | Britain retains control |
| Fourteenth Siege (the "Great Siege of Gibraltar") | 24 June 1779 | 7 February 1783 | The fourteenth and final siege (the "Great Siege of Gibraltar") was the longest and most famous of Gibraltar's sieges. The American War of Independence broke out in 1775, and in 1779, Spain allied with France and declared war on Britain, the primary ambition of which being to recover Gibraltar. Bearing in mind the futility of previous sieges in which Gibraltar had been blockaded only by land, the Spanish launched a combined land and sea blockade in an attempt to starve the garrison into surrender. They bribed the sultan of Morocco into severing trade with Gibraltar and built booms to prevent ships landing supplies, while simultaneously blockading the isthmus with over 13,000 men, where work began on rebuilding the batteries from the previous siege 50 years earlier. From the summer of 1780, Spanish forces attempted to bombard Gibraltar with fire ships and gunboats, while the British attempted to devise ways of frustrating these attacks as well as bombarding the Spanish camp with the few cannon that could reach. The Spanish bombardment continued throughout the siege, though slackening at times, but the naval blockade was intermittent, meaning that merchants were able to land and sell supplies to the garrison, preventing it from being starved into submission. The merchants also conveyed those civilians who could afford it away from the Rock, and so the civilian population gradually declined. The siege concluded after Britain ceded East and West Florida and Menorca to Spain in exchange for Gibraltar in lengthy negotiations facilitated by France. | Britain retains control |

== See also ==
- History of Gibraltar
- Timeline of the history of Gibraltar
