= Fifth siege of Gibraltar =

1349–50 attempt by Alfonso XI of Castile to retake Gibraltar

Coordinates: 36°09′37″N 5°20′48″W

- Part of the Battle of the Strait during the Reconquista
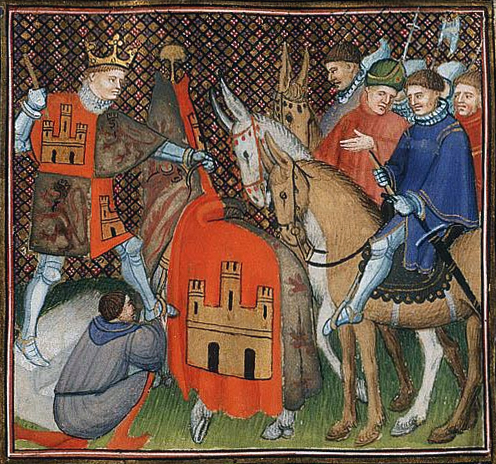
- Alfonso XI (left), king of Leon and Castile
Date	August 1349 – March 1350
Location	Gibraltar
Result	Moorish victory

Belligerents
Kingdom of Castile	Emirate of Granada; Marinid dynasty

Commanders and leaders
Alfonso XI of Castile	Yusuf I of Granada; Abu Inan Faris

The fifth siege of Gibraltar, mounted between August 1349 and March 1350, was a second attempt by King Alfonso XI of Castile to retake the fortified town of Gibraltar. It had been held by the Moors since 1333. The siege followed years of intermittent conflict between the Christian kingdoms of Spain and the Moorish Emirate of Granada, which was supported by the Marinid sultanate of Morocco. A series of Moorish defeats and reverses had left Gibraltar as a Moorish-held enclave within Castilian territory. Its geographical isolation was compensated for by the strength of its fortifications, which had been greatly improved since 1333. Alfonso brought an army of around 20,000 men, along with his mistress and their five illegitimate children, to dig in to the north of Gibraltar for a lengthy siege. In the New Year of 1350, however, bubonic plague – the Black Death – broke out in the Castilian camp. Alfonso refused to abandon the siege but fell victim to the plague on 27 March 1350, becoming the only monarch to die of the disease.

== Prelude to the siege ==
Alfonso XI had attempted to retake Gibraltar in the fourth siege of 1333, immediately after the fortified town had been captured by the Moors in the third siege, but had been forced to withdraw after two months of siege warfare. Peace was temporarily restored through a four-year truce that expired in 1338.

After resuming the conflict in 1339, the Moors suffered major reverses. A Moroccan army under Abd al-Malik Abd al-Wahid was wiped out by the Castilians in 1339 while in 1340 a much bigger army under Yusuf I of Granada and Sultan Abu al-Hasan Ali ibn Othman of Morocco was destroyed in the Battle of Río Salado by a Christian army representing all the Christian Spanish kingdoms and Portugal. It was one of the largest battles of the Reconquista with possibly as many as 150,000–200,000 men on each side; the Moors admitted to 60,000 dead on their side alone. Although the defeat left Moorish Andalusia extremely vulnerable, the Christian kingdoms did not press their advantage and gave the Moors time to rebuild their forces.

== Fall of Algeciras ==
In August 1342, Alfonso XI laid siege to the strategic port of Algeciras on the western side of the Bay of Gibraltar with a Castilian naval force blockading the city's access to the sea. The twenty-month siege was notable for its use of cannon by the Moors; it was one of the first occasions that guns were used effectively in European warfare. Although they succeeded in holding off the Castilians, neither side was able to gain the upper hand until the Castilian fleet managed to lay a boom across the entrance to the harbour of Algeciras, completing the blockade. With the garrison now completely cut off, Yusuf I accepted defeat in March 1344 and proposed a fifteen-year truce in exchange for the surrender of Algeciras, permitting the garrison to withdraw peacefully, and the resumption of tribute payments by Granada to Castile. Alfonso XI accepted the proposal but reduced the truce period to ten years.

The truce only lasted until 1348 when Abu al-Hasan Ali ibn Othman was overthrown by his son Abu Inan Faris. Yusuf I resumed hostilities with a raid against Castilian territory. This gave Alfonso XI the opportunity to declare to the Castilian Cortes in December 1348 that he would march against Gibraltar, which was by now a Moorish enclave within Castilian-held territory. It was not an easy target; the town had been substantially refortified with new walls, towers and a greatly strengthened citadel, the Moorish Castle. Many of the weaknesses that had been exposed in the sieges of 1333, such as a lack of fortifications in the south of Gibraltar, had been remedied.

== Siege and plague ==
Alfonso XI launched his expedition in August 1349, having made extensive preparations to ensure that he would not face the problems that had doomed his 1333 attempt. He raised money through three extraordinary levies, obtaining shares of ecclesiastical income granted by the Pope (who had endorsed Alfonso's campaigns as crusades), selling royal lands and having the crown jewels melted down and sold. He also had much tighter control of his nobles than in 1333, with many of the great nobles of Castile accompanying the expedition. He set up his base in the area of La Línea de la Concepción, north of Gibraltar, with an army of some 20,000 men. The Castilians made no attempt to storm Gibraltar but settled down for a long siege and dug defensive ditches across the isthmus to block Moorish attempts to break out. The camp was more like a town than a temporary camp, with barracks constructed for the army. Alfonso even brought along most of his family by his mistress Leonora de Guzman – four boys and a girl – with his legitimate son Peter remaining in Seville. The siege was supported by primitive cannon in what was to be the first use of gunpowder weapons against Gibraltar's fortifications.

The siege dragged on through autumn and winter with no sign of the garrison surrendering. In the New Year of 1350, the Black Death – which had been raging through western Europe for the previous two years – appeared in the camp. The outbreak caused panic as increasing numbers of Castilian troops began dying from the plague. The generals, nobles and ladies of the royal household begged Alfonso to call off the siege, but the king refused; according to the Castilian chroniclers, he drew his sword and declared that he would not leave until Gibraltar was under Christian rule again. As the Chronica de Alfonso XI puts it,

He replied to the Lords and Knights who so advised and counselled him, that he asked them to voice no such advice [to leave]; for he had that town and noble fortress on the point of surrendering to him, and he minded that it would soon be his; the Moors had won it and the Christians had lost it in his time, and it would be a greatly shameful thing if because of fear of death he left it as it was."

Alfonso's determination was soon to cost him his life. The Chronica records that "it was the will of God that the King fell ill and had the swellings, and he died on Good Friday, 27 March of the year of our Lord Jesus Christ 1350." His death meant the immediate end of the siege. He was the only medieval monarch to die of the plague. Yusuf I, who had been organising a relief force, let the Castilians withdraw in peace, while the Moorish garrison of Gibraltar left the safety of the town walls to bid farewell to the Castilian king's funeral cortège. The Moors recognised that they had had a narrow escape; as the Arab historian Al-Khatib later put it, "King Alfonso was within reach of obtaining the whole Spanish peninsula, ... yet as he besieged Gibraltar, Allah in His great wisdom favoured the Faithful in their extremity."

== Bibliography ==
- Agrait, Nicolás (1998). "The Reconquest During the Reign of Alfonso XI". In O'Callaghan, Joseph F.; Kagay, Donald J.; Vann, Theresa M. (eds.). On the Social Origins of Medieval Institutions: Essays in Honor of Joseph F. O'Callaghan. Leiden: BRILL. ISBN 9789004110960.
- Agrait, Nicolás (2010). Rogers, Clifford (ed.). The Oxford Encyclopedia of Medieval Warfare and Military Technology, Volume 1. Oxford: Oxford University Press. ISBN 9780195334036.
- Hills, George (1974). Rock of Contention: A history of Gibraltar. London: Robert Hale & Company. ISBN 0-7091-4352-4.
- Jackson, William G. F. (1986). The Rock of the Gibraltarians. Cranbury, NJ: Associated University Presses. ISBN 0-8386-3237-8.
