= Fourth siege of Gibraltar =

Conflict between Castilian and Moorish forces (1333)

Coordinates: 36°08′44″N 5°21′28″W

- Part of the Battle of the Strait during the Reconquista
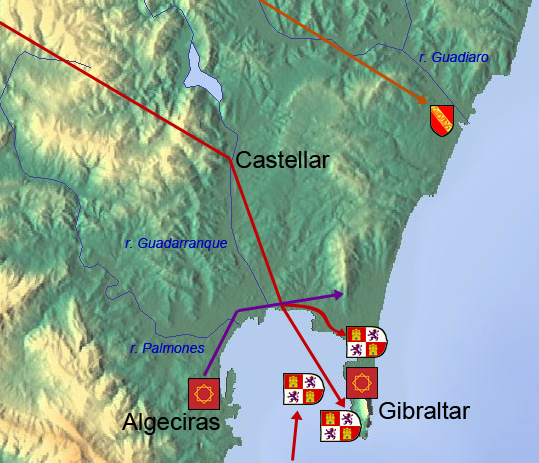
- Map of military movements in the fourth siege of Gibraltar
Date	June – August 1333
Location	Gibraltar
Result	Marinid victory

Belligerents
Kingdom of Castile	Emirate of Granada; Marinid Sultanate

Commanders and leaders
Alfonso XI of Castile	Muhammed IV of Granada; Abd al-Malik Abd al-Wahid

The fourth siege of Gibraltar, fought from June until August 1333, pitted a Christian army under King Alfonso XI of Castile against a large Moorish army led by Muhammed IV of Granada and Abd al-Malik Abd al-Wahid of Fes. It followed on immediately from the third siege of Gibraltar, fought earlier in 1333. The siege began inauspiciously with a disastrous landing by Castilian forces on the west side of Gibraltar, before developing into a stalemate in which neither side had the strength to capture Gibraltar, nor to break out or lift the siege. Both sides faced acute shortages of food – the Gibraltar garrison was cut off from resupply, while the Castilians, deep within enemy territory, could only be resupplied via an unreliable sea route. After two months of inconclusive siege warfare, the Castilians and Moors reached a truce agreement that allowed both sides to make an honourable exit from the siege. Although the Moors managed to keep Gibraltar, the truce cost Muhammed IV his life when he was assassinated by disgruntled nobles the day after signing it.

== Start of the siege ==
Gibraltar was ruled by the Kingdom of Castile between 1309 and 1333, after having been in Muslim hands for almost 600 years. The Marinid ruler Abu al-Hasan Ali ibn Othman allied with his Granadan counterpart, Muhammed IV, to mount a siege of the fortified town between February–June 1333. The Castilian garrison held out for over four months but starvation forced it to capitulate only a few days before a relief force under the Castilian king, Alfonso XI, was due to arrive.

Alfonso already had a fleet in the Bay of Gibraltar under the command of Admiral Alfonso Jofre de Tenorio. His army's overland march from Jerez de la Frontera had been held up by squabbles with his nobles, whom he had to persuade to continue on after the news of Gibraltar's fall arrived on 20 June. He pointed out that the Moors would not yet have secured their position in the fortress; they would still be taking stock, repairing the damage that they had caused to the fortifications and reprovisioning the new garrison. There was no time to lose in pressing a counter-attack.

The Castilians left their encampment by the Guadalete river near Jerez and marched first to Alcalá de los Gazules, taking the direct but mountainous route to Gibraltar. On 26 June they reached Castellar de la Frontera on the upper reaches of the Guadarranque river and marched down the river's left bank towards the old Roman city of Carteia at the head of the Bay of Gibraltar. A 6,000-strong Moorish force from nearby Algeciras under Abd al-Malik followed them on lower ground near the coast. Alfonso stuck to the high ground of the Sierra Carbonera from which the Moors sought to lure him into an ambush as his army descended the slope towards Gibraltar. The Castilian king realised the Moors' intentions and set a trap for them in turn. He sent his rear guard directly down the slope while his cavalry, archers and lancers outflanked the Moors by working their way through the woods on the sides of the mountain. Alfonso anticipated that the Moors would seek to gain the crest, from where they would descend to attack the rear guard. His flankers would in turn occupy the newly vacated crest, sandwiching the Moors between two Castilian forces. The king's prediction of the Moors' strategy proved accurate and they were routed, losing 500 men.

Despite Alfonso's orders that his men were not to pursue the retreating Moors beyond the Guadarranque, a large contingent disobeyed and pressed on to the next river, the Palmones. The Castilians nearly ran into disaster when a fresh Moorish force emerged from Algeciras but were saved by Alfonso's naval force, which rowed up the Palmones to block the Moors. As night fell, the two sides disengaged with the Moors returning to Algeciras and the Castilians encamping on the east side of the Guadarranque.

== Attempt to land on Gibraltar ==
Indiscipline was also to doom Alfonso's first attempt to assault Gibraltar. His troops were transported by Admiral Jofre's galleys to the Red Sands on the poorly fortified southern side of Gibraltar. However, Alfonso's field commanders – Rui Lopez and Fernan Yañez de Meira – failed to control their troops or coordinate their landings. The first wave of Castilians were meant to cover the landing of the second wave, whereupon the entire force would take up siege positions on both sides of the town. Instead, the first wave ignored their orders and charged up the side of the Rock of Gibraltar in an attempt to reach the Moorish Castle. As the second wave was landing without cover, the Moorish garrison launched a sally and caught the Castilians landing on the beach. Many were killed there, forcing the remainder to retreat and cutting off around 1,500 men still on the upper slopes. The Moors positioned themselves to block any further landings, raining arrows on approaching boats and cavalry lined up to deal with any Castilians who made it ashore. Both Lopez and de Meira were killed.

Alfonso now faced a severe dilemma. A persistent Levanter wind had prevented his resupply ships from entering the bay and his army now had only a day's rations left. He reluctantly agreed to his nobles' insistence that they had to withdraw to Castilian territory, abandoning the men left on the Rock, who were to "take their stand on whatever God might wish to give them." However, the situation changed again only a few miles into the retreat from their base at Carteia. Accounts differ as to what happened; some say that Alfonso persuaded his nobles that it would be dishonorable to abandon the trapped men, while others say that the winds changed at the last minute and permitted the resupply vessels to enter the bay after all. Whichever happened, it is evident that the Castilians marched back to their original position to resume the assault on Gibraltar.

It was decided that the same plan of attack would be used again, but more competently executed this time. More experienced commanders – Don Jaime de Jerica and the brothers Laso and Sancho de Rojas – were put in charge of a fresh assault on the Red Sands. The Castilians sought to overwhelm the Moors by rushing them en masse, using every small boat at their disposal to carry soldiers, crossbowmen and even cavalry with their horses. As the crossbowmen laid down covering fire, the knights saddled up and drove the Moorish forces on the beach back within the town walls. At the same time, Admiral Jofre sought to destroy the Moorish galleys anchored in Gibraltar's dockyard. His move failed, as the Moors had built a heavy roof over the dockyard to protect ships there from bombardment and had emplaced massive wooden booms across the entrance to prevent enemies from gaining access. The naval attack was beaten back with heavy loss of life, but Jofre did succeed in establishing an effective blockade of Gibraltar's sea routes.

== Bombardment and stalemate ==
The Castilians dug in around Gibraltar to lay siege from the south, from the high ground of the Upper Rock and from the isthmus to the north, where Alfonso remained with his main force. The Castilian king had hoped to retake the town in a quick counter-attack but now faced a lengthy siege. Consequently, he set about demolishing the town's fortifications with six catapults that he had brought from Seville, three of which were hoisted by ropes up from the isthmus to the Upper Rock where they could overlook the whole of the town. The Moorish Castle was heavily bombarded and seriously damaged, while Castilian Almogavars sought to undermine its structure from below. The defenders inflicted casualties by throwing stones over the parapets and burning pitch at the attackers, destroying some of the Castilian siege machines.

Both sides faced harsh conditions in the siege. The Moors were being progressively starved by the Castilians, but the Castilians also had supply problems. They were deep within enemy territory and relied entirely on resupply from the sea, which was dependent on the winds and tides being right. Food was in short supply for both sides. Some Castilians tried to defect to the Moorish side but were enslaved and sold on at Algeciras for a price equivalent to an eighth of the value of a cow. Matters worsened for the Castilians when the army of Muhammed IV marched towards Gibraltar with the apparent intention of relieving the besieged garrison. Alfonso pulled back his own army to the isthmus immediately north of Gibraltar and had a defensive ditch dug right across it. This successfully deterred Muhammed IV from attacking, but cut the Castilians off from their supply of firewood in the hills of the Sierra Carbonera; henceforth, they had to eat their food raw.

The siege now developed into a stalemate. The Moors were not strong enough to break out of Gibraltar, nor to assault the Castilians from the north across their ditch. They also did not have the naval power required to outflank the Castilians by sea or to break the naval blockade of Gibraltar, which was bringing the garrison close to starvation. The Castilians did not have the strength either to storm Gibraltar or to drive away Mohammad IV's troops on the Sierra Carbonera. Alfonso XI also received the news that three powerful nobles – Juan Núñez III de Lara, Juan Alfonso de Haro and Juan Manuel, Prince of Villena – had revolted against him and were ravaging the king's own lands. Both sides thus found that they had pressing reasons to reach a peace agreement.

The agreement which was eventually signed on 24 August 1333 was based on a Moorish proposal for a four-year truce and an annual tribute of 10,000 doubloons to be paid to Castile. In return, the Moors were to be allowed to purchase oil and cattle from Castilian territory, and Alfonso and his army would be given safe conduct through Moorish territory on their way home. The Castilian king accepted and sealed the agreement in person with Muhammed IV at a lavish dinner in which he exchanged gifts with his Moorish counterpart. Muhammed is said to have given Alfonso a sword with gold sheath studded with emeralds, rubies and sapphires and a helmet with two rubies "the size of chestnuts" while Alfonso gave Muhammed a type of doublet. As the Castilians prepared to withdraw, Abd al-Malik's forces returned to Algeciras and Muhammed IV made preparations to go back to Granada. On the night after the peace agreement was signed, Muhammed IV was murdered by two of his nobles who were angry that the sultan had eaten with a Christian and feared that he had converted to Christianity. The assassination did not prevent the Castilians from withdrawing safely but resulted in renewed hostilities for a while as the new Granadan king, Yusuf I, sought to establish his authority. The inconclusive outcome of the siege meant that the struggle for control of Gibraltar remained unresolved, and Alfonso was to make another attempt to recapture it in the fifth siege of Gibraltar in 1349.

== Bibliography ==
- Hills, George (1974). Rock of Contention: A history of Gibraltar. London: Robert Hale & Company. ISBN 0-7091-4352-4.
- Jackson, William G. F. (1986). The Rock of the Gibraltarians. Cranbury, NJ: Associated University Presses. ISBN 0-8386-3237-8.
- Sayer, Frederick (1865). The History of Gibraltar and of its Political Relation to Events in Europe. Chapman and Hall.
