= Muhammad IV of Granada =

Ruler of the Emirate of Granada from 1325 to 1333

Muhammad IV
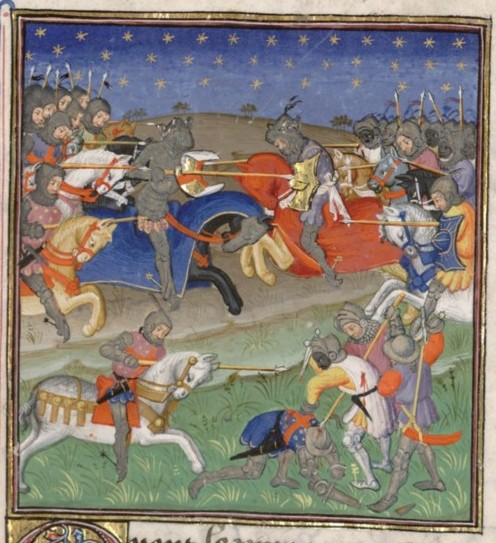
- Battle between Alfonso XI and Muhammad IV (1330)

Sultan of Granada
- Reign: 8 July 1325 – 25 August 1333
- Predecessor: Ismail I
- Successor: Yusuf I
- Born: 14 April 1315; Granada
- Died: 25 August 1333 (aged 18)
- Dynasty: Nasrid
- Father: Ismail I
- Religion: Islam

Abu Abdullah Muhammad ibn Ismail (Note: Arabic: أبو عبد الله محمد بن إسماعيل الرابع) also known as Muhammad IV (14 April 1315 – 25 August 1333), was the ruler of the Emirate of Granada on the Iberian Peninsula from 1325 to 1333. He was the sixth Sultan of the Nasrid dynasty, succeeding to the throne at ten years old when his father, Ismail I (r. 1314–1325), was assassinated.

The initial years of his reign were marked by conflict among his ministers, who vied for control of the young sultan's government. This escalated into a civil war between the party of the vizier Muhammad ibn al-Mahruq and that of the powerful commander of the Volunteers of the Faith, Uthman ibn Abi al-Ula. Uthman declared Muhammad's uncle, Muhammad ibn Faraj, as a rival sultan and secured support from Alfonso XI of Castile (r. 1312–1350), Granada's Christian neighbour to the north. Muhammad IV requested help from Abu Said Uthman II (r. 1310–1331) of the Marinid Sultanate in Morocco and gave him territories in the Iberian Peninsula, including Ronda, Marbella, and Algeciras, probably in exchange for Marinid troops. The civil war ended in 1328 when Muhammad, who despite his youth had begun taking a more active role in government, reconciled with Uthman ibn Abi al-Ula, and ordered Ibn al-Mahruq assassinated; the pretender Muhammad ibn Faraj was sent to North Africa. In 1329 he appointed his childhood tutor Abu Nuaym Ridwan as the hajib (chamberlain), outranking his other ministers; this was the first time the title appeared in the Emirate of Granada.

In 1328 and 1329, Alfonso XI formed an anti-Granada alliance with another Iberian monarch, Alfonso IV of Aragon (r. 1327–1336). Both Christian kingdoms invaded Granada in 1330, with Alfonso XI leading his army to take Teba and pillage the Granadan countryside. Muhammad sought terms, and secured a treaty with Castile on 19 February 1331. Alfonso XI soon broke the treaty by stopping food exports to Granada as had been agreed, while Aragon did not join the treaty and was invaded by Granadan forces. In September 1332, Muhammad sailed to the Marinid court at Fez to request help. The new Marinid Sultan Abu al-Hasan Ali (r. 1331–1348) sent 5,000 troops, led by his son Abu Malik Abd al-Wahid, to Algeciras in early 1333. The troops besieged the Castilians at Gibraltar: the town surrendered in June 1333 but was in turn besieged by Alfonso XI. Muhammad raided Castile in a diversionary attack before marching to relieve Gibraltar. This resulted in a stalemate that ended with a truce on 24 August 1333 that lifted the siege of Gibraltar and restored the 1331 treaty. One day later, Muhammad was assassinated (aged 18) on the orders of the sons of Uthman ibn Abi al-Ula (who had died in 1330), who resented either the sultan's alliance with the Marinids or his friendliness with Castile. He was succeeded by his brother Yusuf I (r. 1333–1354).

== Background ==
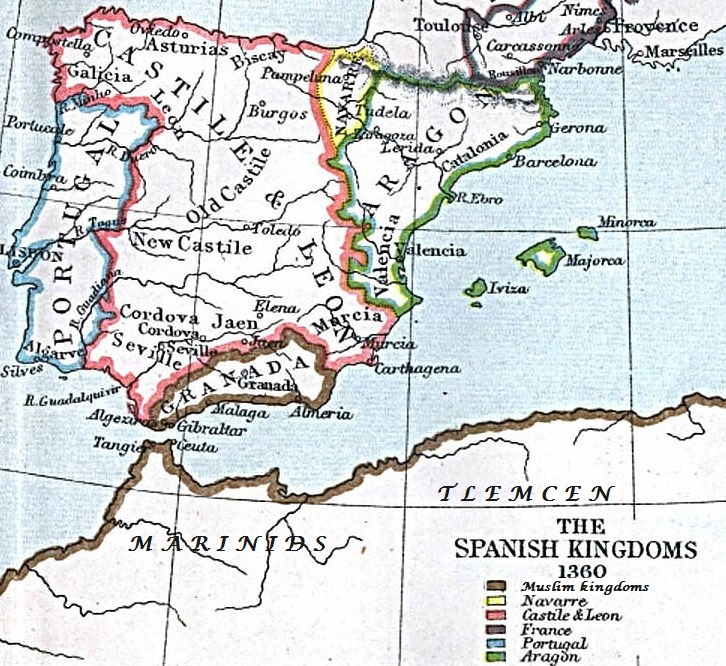
The Emirate of Granada and the surrounding kingdoms in 1360

Founded by Muhammad I in the 1230s, the Emirate of Granada was the last Muslim state on the Iberian Peninsula. Through a combination of diplomatic and military manoeuvres, the emirate succeeded in maintaining its independence, despite being located between two larger neighbours: the Christian Crown of Castile to the north and the Muslim Marinid Sultanate across the Alboran Sea in Morocco. Granada intermittently entered into alliance or went to war with both of these powers, or encouraged them to fight one another, in order to avoid being dominated by either. From time to time, the sultans of Granada paid tribute to the kings of Castile, an important source of income for Castile and a heavy burden for Granada. From Castile's point of view, Granada was a royal vassal, but the European concept of vassalage was alien to the Islamic world. Muhammad I, for instance, on occasion declared his fealty to other Muslim sovereigns. Between the last decades of the 13th century and the mid-14th century, in what modern historians call the "Battle of the Strait" (Batalla del Estrecho), Granada, Castile, and the Marinids contended for the strategically important ports of the Straits of Gibraltar, such as Algeciras, Gibraltar, and Tarifa, which controlled passage between the Iberian Peninsula and North Africa. At the time of Muhammad IV's accession, Castile held Gibraltar (after a siege in 1309), allowing it to interfere with traffic into the nearby Algeciras, while Granadan control of Algeciras similarly impeded traffic into Gibraltar from the Castilian-held Tarifa and elsewhere. Another Christian power in the peninsula, the Crown of Aragon was at peace with Granada following the 1321 treaty between the two kingdoms, which included a provision for free movement for Aragonese Muslim subjects who wished to emigrate to Muslim lands.

== Early life ==
Abu Abdullah Muhammad ibn Ismail was born in the city of Granada on 14 April 1315 (7 Muharram 715 AH), the first son of Sultan Ismail I, who took the throne in February 1314 after deposing his uncle Nasr. His mother was Alwa, a Christian. On 8 July 1325 (26 Rajab 725 AH), his father was assassinated by a relative, Muhammad ibn Ismail. According to Ibn al-Khatib and the Castilian Chronicle of Alfonso XI, the direct motive of the attack was a personal grievance, but the Castilian chronicle adds that it was secretly masterminded by Uthman ibn al-Ula, the shaykh al-ghuzat or the commander of the Volunteers of the Faith—North African troops in Granadan service. The assassin, as well as his brother who participated in the attack, were arrested and killed on the spot, but Uthman was not incriminated. According to Ibn Khaldun, Uthman was instead the person who found and executed the murderer. The ten-year-old Muhammad was proclaimed sultan on the same day. Ismail's vizier (chief minister), Abu al-Hasan ibn Mas'ud, was wounded while defending Ismail I during the assassination, but managed to rally the court to declare their allegiance to Muhammad IV. Among the people who swore their allegiance were judges, preachers, sufis, ulama, grammarians, and secretaries of the chancery. Muhammad's paternal grandmother, Fatima bint al-Ahmar, lent crucial support to his accession, and provided additional legitimacy because it was through her that Muhammad IV descended from previous sultans of Granada, while his grandfather Abu Said Faraj did not belong to the lineage of sultans.

== Reign ==
=== The young sultan and his ministers ===
A map of the Emirate of Granada, depicting relevant towns and cities

Due to his youth, he was subject to the influence of his court ministers and his grandmother. At first Ibn Mas'ud continued to serve as vizier, but he died from infections of his wounds a month after Muhammad's accession. He was replaced by the wakil (Note: Under the Nasrids, the wakil was the superintendent of the sultan's finances. Ibn al-Mahruq had held this post since Ismail I's reign.) Muhammad ibn al-Mahruq, nominated by Uthman, who kept his post as the commander of the Volunteers. Uthman's military command and his link to the vizier made him a powerful figure in the young sultan's court. Muhammad's guardianship was left to his tutor, Abu Nuaym Ridwan, and his grandmother, both of whom also participated in government.

Soon, Uthman's despotic behaviour alienated the other ministers, as he deprived them of authority and appropriated the state funds almost exclusively for the payment of the Volunteers. This led Ibn al-Mahruq to fear that the ambitious Uthman was planning a coup to seize power for himself. An open rivalry emerged between the two, which climaxed in December 1326, when Uthman's troops occupied the city and forced Ibn al-Mahruq and his followers to confine themselves to the Alhambra palace, while Ibn al-Mahruq appointed Yahya ibn Umar ibn Rahhu, Uthman's son-in-law and a member of the Banu Rahhu clan, as a rival commander of the Volunteers. This led the Volunteer troops to abandon Uthman, who was left with his own family and their followers, numbering only 1,000 men.

=== Civil war ===
Uthman and his followers marched to Almería, pretending that he planned to return from that port to his native North Africa. However, there he invited an uncle of Muhammad IV, Abu Abdullah Muhammad ibn Faraj, and declared him a rival sultan in late January 1327, with the laqab (regnal honorific) al-Qaim bi-amr Allah ("He who carries out God's orders"). Uthman and Abu Abdullah won the allegiance of the people of the nearby fortress of Andarax on 4 April. Uthman turned it into his stronghold for the struggle against Muhammad's ministers. The surrounding areas soon also recognised his authority, throwing Granada into an open civil war.

Uthman made contact with the Castilians to support him in the war. King Alfonso XI of Castile quickly took advantage of the division in Granada by invading its western provinces, and some Muslim sources even report that one of Uthman's sons guided Alfonso XI during his invasion of the province of Ronda and the capture of Olvera, in June 1327. Subsequently, Alfonso conquered Pruna, followed by the nearby Ayamonte and Torre Alháquime which both surrendered without a fight. At sea, the Granadan fleet was defeated by that of the Castilian admiral Alfonso Jofré Tenorio: three galleys and 300 men were captured and taken to Seville. Muhammad's court was forced to seek help from the Marinid Sultanate, and he had to surrender Ronda and Marbella, followed by Algeciras in the next year, to the Marinids, probably in exchange for troops. The Marinid sultan Abu Said Uthman II sent troops to the peninsula in 1327 and 1328 to help Muhammad. Meanwhile, Muhammad, now 13 years old, began to exercise effective control of his government. The losses inflicted by the civil war caused him to change course: in July/August 1328, he effected a reconciliation with Uthman ibn al-Ula, who settled in Guadix. On 6 November 1328 Muhammad ordered his household slaves to assassinate Ibn al-Mahruq. Muhammad reappointed Uthman as shaykh al-ghuzat, a post that he held until his death in 1330. Uthman, back in his previous position of power, sent the pretender Abu Abdullah to North Africa, definitively ending the civil war.

=== Political developments up to 1329 ===
Alfonso XI had been proclaimed to have reached majority on 13 August 1325, his fourteenth birthday, ending the period of weak leadership that had followed the death of his regents at the Battle of the Vega of Granada in 1319 and the decisive Granadan victory in that battle. He was involved during the civil war between Muhammad's ministers, fighting on Uthman's side and capturing frontier castles in 1327. His neighbour, James II of Aragon, maintained peaceful relations with Granada, having signed a peace treaty with Muhammad IV in 1326, based on the previous treaty with Ismail I in 1321. James II died in 1327 and was succeeded by his son Alfonso IV, who took a more belligerent stance towards Granada. The new Aragonese king was wary of Muhammad's alliance with the Marinids, while the latter increased their naval activities in the Straits of Gibraltar and reportedly planned to invade Spain. He renewed his father's treaty with Muhammad, but at the same time he allied himself with Alfonso XI, signing the treaties of Agreda in 1328, and of Tarazona on 6 February 1329, aiming at a joint attack against Granada. Alfonso IV also married the Castilian king's sister, Eleanor. He cancelled the Aragon–Granada treaty in March 1329, citing persistent Muslim attacks, and instead declared war on Granada. Against the Aragon–Castile alliance, the Granadan military in 1329 included 4,000 horsemen, including 3,000 North African and 1,000 Andalusians. Among these, 1,000 North Africans and 600 Andalusians were deployed to garrison the capital.

On 17 May 1329 (17 Rajab 729), Muhammad appointed his former tutor Abu Nuaym Ridwan as hajib (chamberlain). This was the first time the office of hajib appeared in the history of the Nasrids. The office was modeled after the hajib of the 10th century Umayyad Caliphate of Córdoba: the hajib acted as a sort of prime minister, outranked the vizier and the other ministers and had command of the army in the absence of the sultan. Ridwan, a Castilian-Catalan convert to Islam who rose through the ranks during the reign of Ismail I, would continue to hold the post during the reign of Muhammad's successor Yusuf I and the first reign (1354–1359) of Muhammad V, except for a brief pause during Yusuf's rule.

=== Countering Christian invasion ===
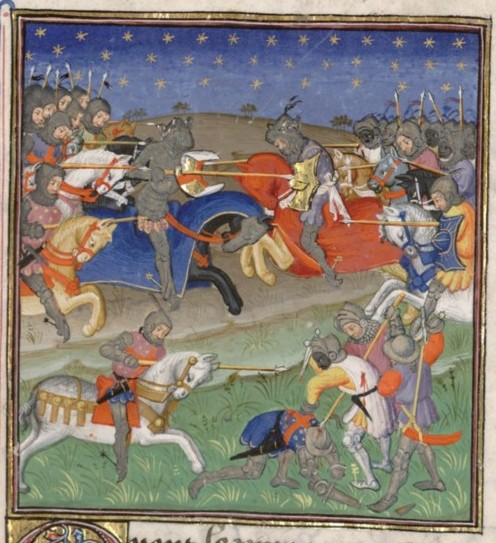
The Battle of Teba, in which Muhammad IV's forces were defeated by Alfonso XI

After Pope John XXII declared the war against Granada a crusade in February 1330, Alfonso IV sent 500 knights to invade Granada's border areas, while Alfonso XI personally led his troops from Córdoba in July 1330. Castilian forces laid siege to the fortress of Teba on 7 August, and were confronted by the 6,000-strong Granadan army led by Uthman ibn Abi al-Ula. The Granadan forces were defeated, and the fortress surrendered on 30 August. Uthman died in the same year at Málaga, and was replaced by his son Abu Thabit Amir as commander of the Volunteers. Crusading forces operating independently from Alfonso XI ravaged the Granadan countryside, causing severe food shortages and leading Muhammad to sue for peace. A peace treaty was agreed on 19 February 1331 in Seville, which was to last for four years. Muhammad agreed to pay tribute to Castile and to send his representative to pay homage to Alfonso XI annually. As part of the peace treaty, Castile agreed to export wheat and livestock to alleviate the shortage in Granada. Despite Muhammad's request, Alfonso IV refused to join the treaty.

Alfonso XI soon broke the truce by stopping the food exports to Granada. Granada continued to be in a state of war with Aragon. Muhammad sent an army led by Ridwan to invade the region around Alicante. The Granadan army sacked Guardamar on 18 October 1331, raided the surrounding countryside, then returned with captives as well as 400 Aragonese Muslims who had decided to join the army. Ridwan's army returned in April 1332 and besieged Elche for five days. Muhammad, considering the continuing threat to his realm and aware of Castile's treaty violation, requested help from the Marinid Sultan Abu al-Hasan Ali, who had succeeded Abu Said Uthman in August 1331. On 7 September, Muhammad personally sailed to Morocco to meet Abu al-Hasan at his court in Fez. The Marinid sultan responded positively, promising to send troops to help the Granadan Muslims and providing Muhammad with gifts. Muhammad also tried to form an alliance with the rebellious Castilian nobleman Juan Manuel.

=== Marinid help and the capture of Gibraltar ===
Abu al-Hasan's aid to Granada consisted of 5,000 soldiers, led by his son, Abu Malik Abd al-Wahid. They sailed to Algeciras in the beginning of 1333, soon besieging Gibraltar by sea and land. The Marinid army was joined by Granada's troops led by Ridwan. The Castilian admiral Alfonso Jofré Tenorio tried to deliver supplies to Gibraltar, but this was prevented by the blockading Marinid fleet. He attempted to fire bags of flour into the town using the trebuchets on his ships, but most of them did not reach the castle. Meanwhile, Muhammad unsuccessfully attacked Castro del Río, but subsequently captured the fortress of Cabra. Gibraltar's defenders surrendered on 17 June 1333, after about five months of siege, and were given safe conduct out of the town. Alfonso XI heard the news three days later, when his relieving army was just a few days' march away at Jerez.

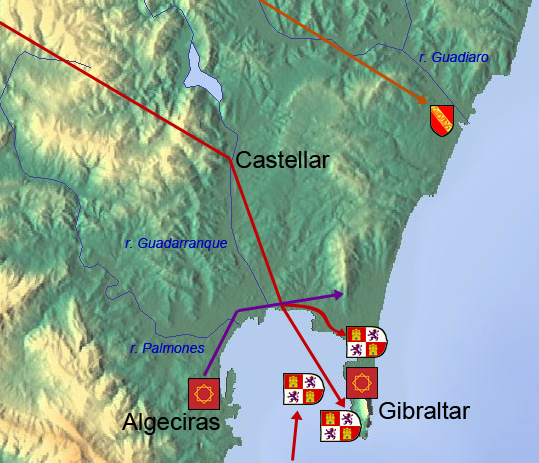
The Castilian attempt to retake Gibraltar, 1333. Granada, Castile, The Marinids

Alfonso XI hastened his march, crossing the Guadarranque by Castellar on 26 June and soon laying siege to retake Gibraltar. The Muslims had reinforced the town by moving supplies from Algeciras, and the troops of Abu Malik stationed in that town opposed Alfonso's army. To divert Castile's attention, Muhammad led a counterattack into Castilian territory, capturing Benamejí and raiding the areas surrounding Córdoba. He met with no resistance because Alfonso's army was pinned by Abu Malik's forces and the Castilian nobles who were supposed to oppose Muhammad rebelled and attacked the Alfonso's castles instead, joined by Juan Manuel who had deserted Alfonso's camp. Muhammad then marched towards Gibraltar. Muhammad initially encamped on the banks of the Guadiaro near the besieged town, and then went to the Sierra Carbonera to join forces with Abu Malik. The Muslim and Christian armies faced off for several days, but after several skirmishes neither side was confident of a decisive victory. Alfonso was also worried about the destruction of his realm by his rebellious nobles. A truce was agreed on 24 August 1333, with Muhammad and Alfonso reaffirming the 1331 treaty of Seville. Muhammad visited Alfonso's tent bringing various gifts, while the Castilian king welcomed him on foot and bareheaded as a sign of respect, and they had a sumptuous meal together.

== Death ==
Muhammad was assassinated on 25 August 1333 (13 Dhu al-Hijja 733 AH) near the mouth of the Guadiaro. Uthman ibn Abi al-Ula's sons, Abu Thabit—the new commander of the volunteers after his father's death—and Ibrahim, were responsible for the plot, although the actual killing was carried out by a slave named Zayyan. According to near-contemporary historian Ibn Khaldun, Muhammad was killed by the two brothers because of his Marinid alliance: their family had been exiled to Granada as political dissidents by the Marinids, and considered the latter as their enemies. Moreover, the Marinid military involvement on the Iberian Peninsula caused the Volunteers of the Faith to lose the influence they previously had as the dominant military force fighting for Granada. Contrary to the Muslim sources, which cite the Marinid factor as the motive for the assassination, Castilian sources state that Muhammad was killed because of his excessive friendliness with Alfonso XI.

According to the historian Brian Catlos, the hajib Ridwan, who was present at the time of the assassination, rode quickly to the capital, arriving on the same day, and, after consultation with Fatima, arranged for the declaration of Muhammad's younger brother Abu'l-Hajjaj Yusuf as the new sultan, Yusuf I. This version of Yusuf's proclamation was also quoted by historians L. P. Harvey and Francisco Vidal Castro, who attribute it to Castilian sources. Francisco Vidal Castro favours another version in which the declaration and the oath of allegiance took place in the Muslim camp near Gibraltar instead of in the capital, and that the sons of Uthman were the ones who proclaimed him. Vidal Castro also writes that the proclamation happened on the day after Muhammad's death (26 August/14 Dhu al-Hijja). Muhammad's body was recovered and buried near the manor house (al-munya al-sayyid) in Málaga, also on 26 August. As per Islamic customs for a martyr, his body was buried immediately without washing. Later a domed mausoleum (qubba) was built on his tomb and poetic epitaphs were inscribed on his tombstone.

== Character ==
His biographers wrote that Muhammad loved hunting, a common pastime of the Nasrid monarchs. He was also reported to be an accomplished rider, often competing with others in the arena. He was skilled in the martial arts, and interested in literature and poetry: he commissioned the Málagan poet Ibn al-Murabi al-Azdi to write verses about the Sierra Nevada and used to listen to poems as a way to relax. In early January 1332, he fell seriously ill and rumours circulated about his death, but he recovered on or before 23 January. At his death, aged around 18, he did not have any descendants, and was likely unmarried.

== Citations ==
Muhammad IV of Granada Nasrid dynasty Cadet branch of the Banu Khazraj Born: 1315 Died: 1333
Regnal titles
Preceded by Ismail I	Sultan of Granada; 1325–1333	Succeeded by Yusuf I
