= Battle of the Strait =

Conflict during the Reconquista

The Battle of the Strait (Spanish: Batalla del Estrecho) was a military conflict contesting the ports in the Straits of Gibraltar taking place in the late thirteenth century and the first half of the fourteenth. The conflict involves principally the Spanish Muslim Emirate of Granada, the Spanish Christian Crown of Castile and the North African Muslim Marinid state. The ports' strategic value came from their position linking Spain and North Africa, thus connecting Muslims in Spain with the rest of the Islamic world. The campaign had mixed results. Castile gained Tarifa permanently, and managed to take Gibraltar and Algeciras but both would revert to Muslim rule. Castile also failed to gain any port in the African side of the strait.

== The Battle for the Strait ==
In the late thirteen and early fourteenth centuries, Castile, the Marinids of Morocco and the Nasrids of Granada fought for the control of the Strait of Gibraltar. This "battle" (Spanish: la Cuestión del Estrecho) is a major chapter in the history of the Christian reconquest of Spain. It was within this framework of clashes between said powers to bring under control such a strategic area when Gibraltar definitely appeared on the scene.

With the implosion of the Almohad Caliphate and the Reconquista onslaught of the 1220–1240s, the north shore of the Strait of Gibraltar came under the jurisdiction of the Nasrid Emirate of Granada, a reduced successor state to al-Andalus. As a dependency of nearby Algeciras, Gibraltar was probably given along with Algeciras in 1274, by the Nasrid sultan Muhammad II to Abu Yusuf Yaqub, the Marinid sultan of Morocco, as payment for his intervention in Spain on Granada's behalf against Castilian encroachments. (other sources mention 1275 as the date when the Sultan of Granada handed over Tarifa, Algeciras and Gibraltar to the Marinids for their use as base ports). In 1292, in his pursuit of controlling the Strait, the troops of Sancho IV of Castile laid siege to Tarifa and easily took it. Under the governorship of Guzmán el Bueno, "the Good", Tarifa was unsuccessfully besieged by the Marinids two years later. As a result, the North African rulers decided to retreated to Magreb and sell their remaining ports to the sultans of Granada.

Although no documentary account of Gibraltar is available for the period following the Madinat al-Fath project, there are reasons to believe that a small fortified town existed in Gibraltar, and that its existence was the direct consequence of the fall of Tarifa in 1292. After the capture of the city, it was expected that Sancho would lay siege to Algeciras (it did not eventually happen) in order to sever the most direct links of the Marinids with the Iberian peninsula. The threatening presence of a Christian stronghold to the west would have led to the establishment of a garrison to the east of Algeciras. That way, Gibraltar would have protected the rearguard of Algeciras and provide a fallback position should Algeciras have fallen. At the same time, and with the increased presence of the Christian fleets in the Straits, Gibraltar provided an excellent lookout post.

Some years after the events in Tarifa, a quarrel erupted between the Marinids and the Nasrids, in 1306. The Nasrids promptly sponsored the rebellion of Uthman ibn Idris, a pretender to the Marinid throne in Morocco. Uthman was landed by a Nasrid force in Ceuta, and quickly carved out an enclave. The rebels continued to receive support across the strait from the Nasrid garrisons. It is believed that the Marinid sultan Abu al-Rabi Sulayman, unable to dislodge the rebel from Ceuta, intrigued with the Castilians, whose truce with Granada was about to expire, encouraging them to take Algeciras and Gibraltar and cut the rebel off. The first siege of Gibraltar was a side-operation of the main Castilian siege of Algeciras in 1309–1310.

The siege was brief. It seems clear that the defences of Madinat al-Fath were lacking as the Castilians succeeded in capturing Gibraltar in 1309. The Castilian account of the First Siege of Gibraltar indicates that it was only a small place, with "one thousand one hundred and twenty-five Moors" within at the time of its fall. Only two siege engines and a few hundred men were needed to reduce it. After the conquest and the expulsion of the town's population, Ferdinand IV of Castile ordered the defences to be strengthened with the walls repaired, a keep constructed above the town and a dockyard (atarazana) to be built to house galleys. However, the main siege of Algeciras failed, and the Castilians struck a deal with the Granadan sultan allowing them to hold on to Gibraltar.

The loss of Gibraltar led to the deposition of the Nasrid sultan of Granada by his brother Nasr, who quickly reversed policy, abandoned the rebels in Ceuta and gave Algeciras (and thus the claim on Gibraltar) to the Marinids in 1310, as part of a new treaty, hoping they might recover it. But too busy elsewhere for any entanglements in Spain, the Marinids gave Algeciras back to Granada almost immediately after. The Granadans launched an attempt to recover Gibraltar by themselves in 1315, but without Marinid support, the Second Siege of Gibraltar faltered and failed.

The Castilians held Gibraltar for over twenty years, until a new deal was struck in 1333 between the Nasrid sultan Muhammad IV of Granada and the Marinid sultan Abu al-Hasan Ali ibn Othman of Morocco. Moroccan forces crossed the strait to Algeciras and began the third siege of Gibraltar in 1333. This was a much more serious effort, lasting four and a half months, and was mounted by a combined Granadan-Moroccan force. The population of Spanish Christians was reduced to eating their own shoes and belts before the town's governor, Vasco Pérez de Meira, surrendered on 17 June 1333. However, Muhammad IV was assassinated almost immediately after, in a conspiracy organized by enemies of the Marinids in the Granadan court. The Marinid sultan Abu al-Hasan retained both Algeciras and Gibraltar in Moroccan hands.

Defences of Moorish Gibraltar
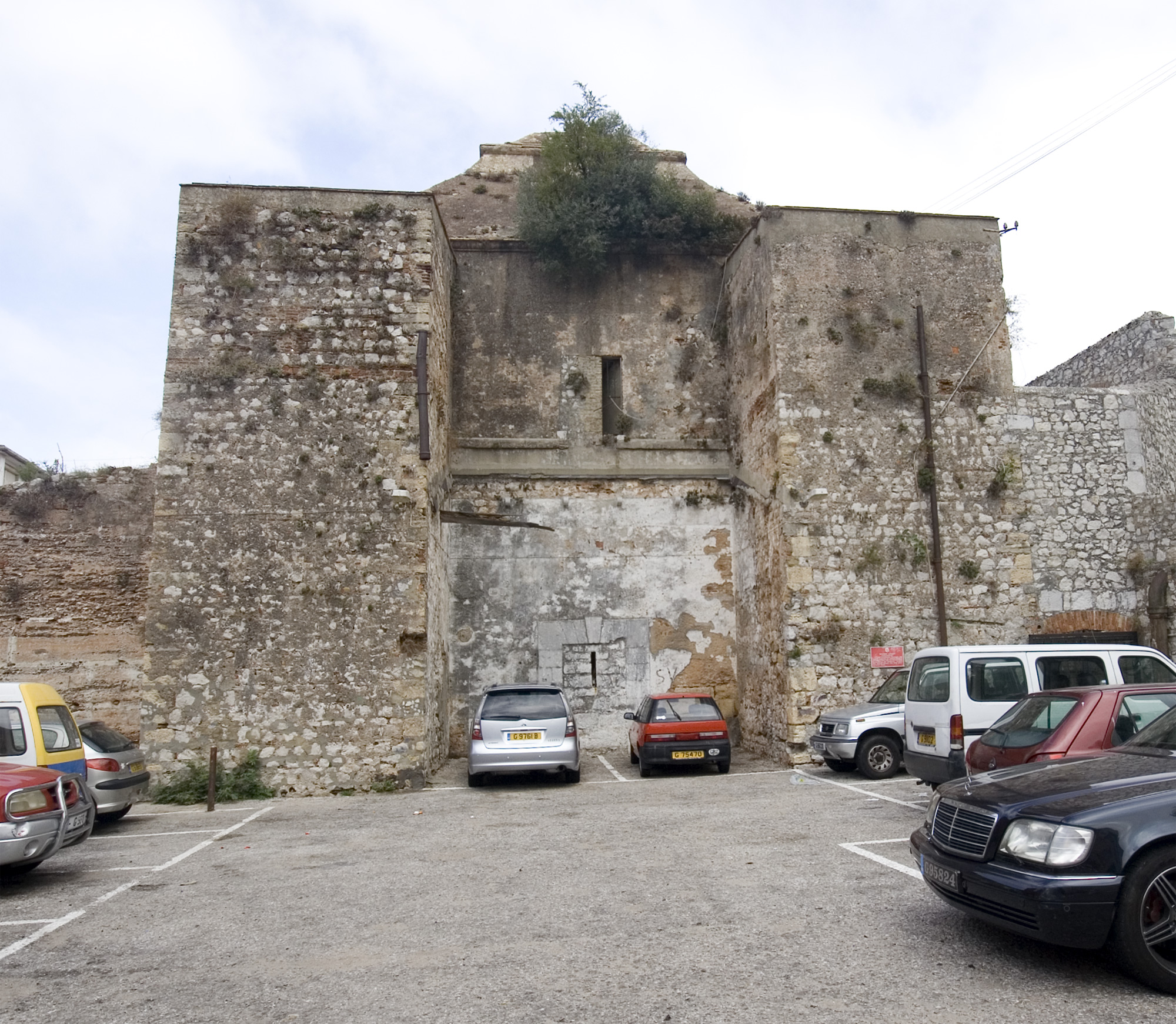
The Moorish gatehouse, through which the former kasbah was entered

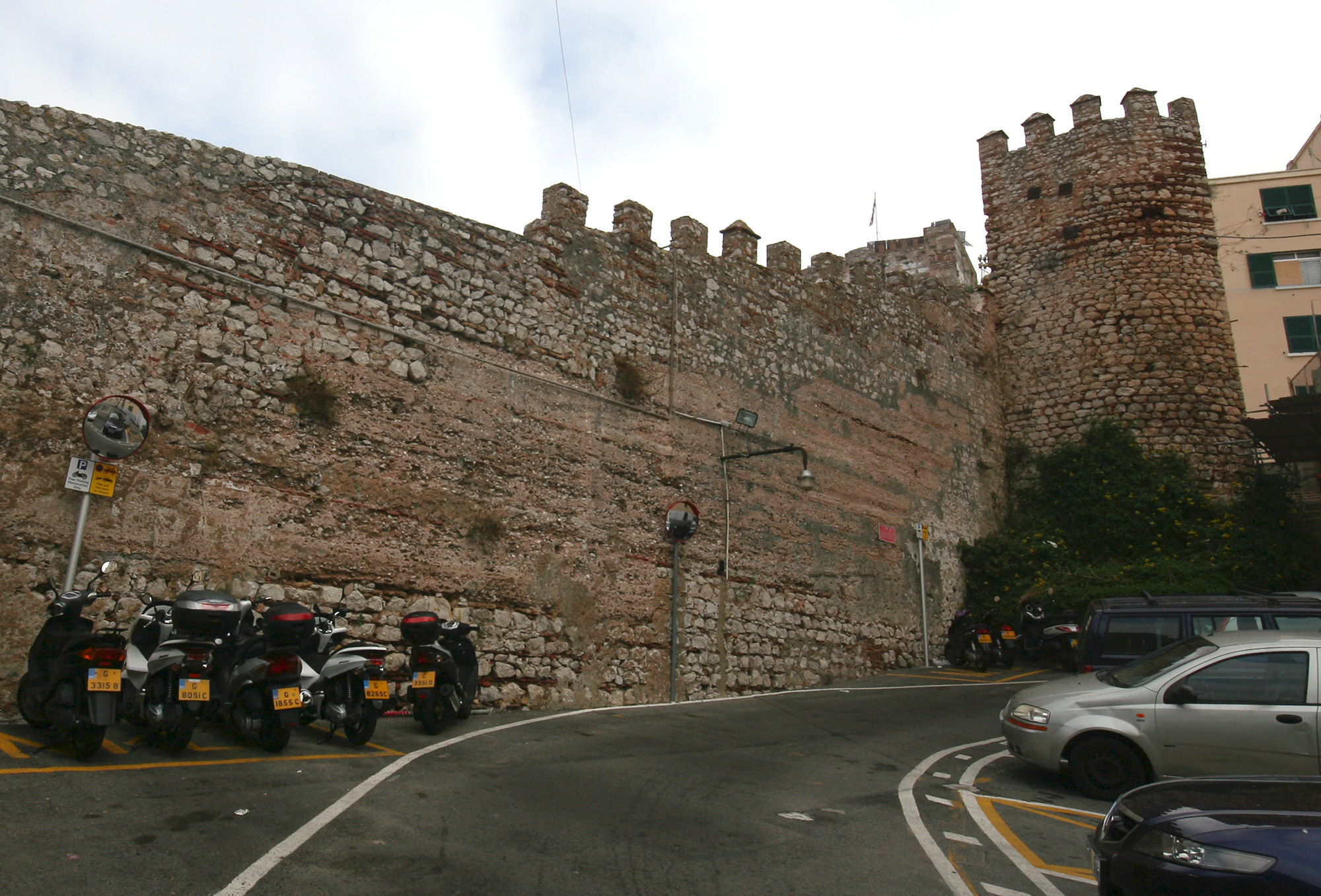
Part of the Moorish city wall with a tower en bec, topped with merlons

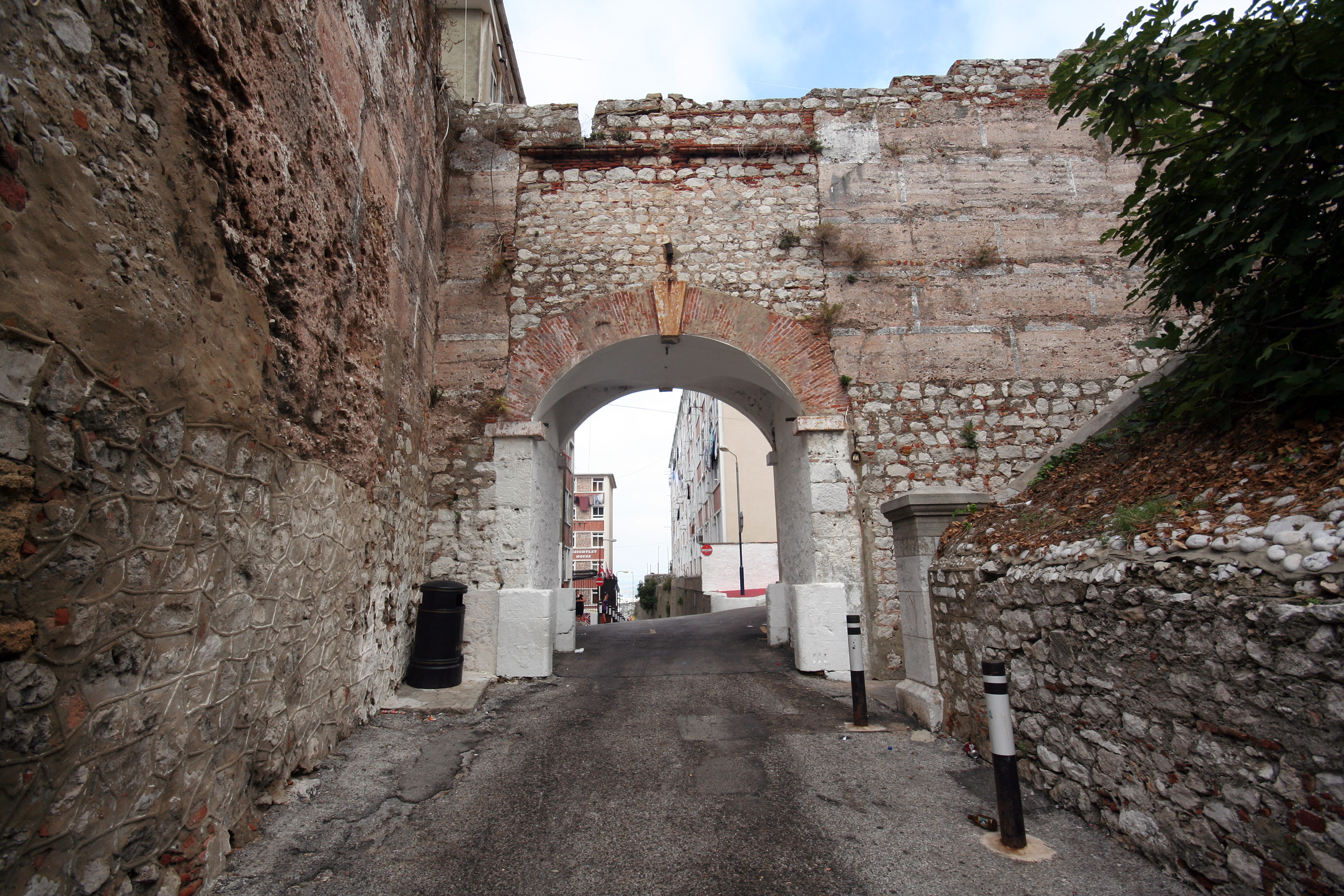
A later (probably British) gate cut through the southern Moorish city wall

The Castilians immediately mounted an unsuccessful fourth siege which ended after two months. Following the restoration of peace, Abu al-Hasan ordered a refortification of Gibraltar "with strong walls as a halo surrounds the crescent moon". Many details of the rebuilt city are known due to the work of Abu al-Hasan's biographer, Ibn Marzuq, whose Musnad (written around 1370–71) describes the reconstruction of Gibraltar. The city was expanded, and a new defensive wall was built to cover the western and southern flanks, with towers and connecting passages added to strengthen them. The existing fortifications were also strengthened and repaired. The weak points that the Castilians had exploited were improved.

== Political situation of the Strait of Gibraltar (1274–1350) ==
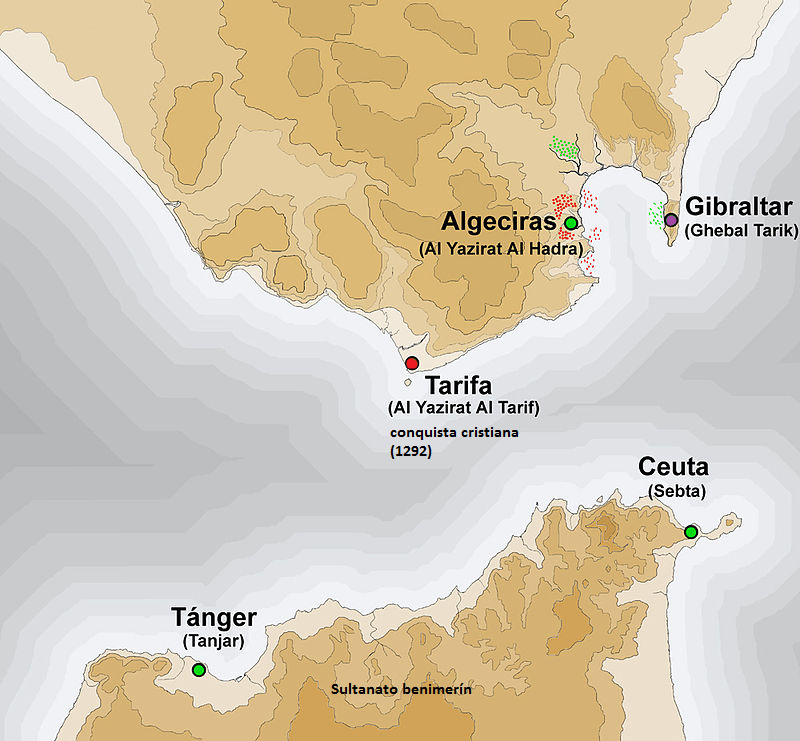
1274 to 1306

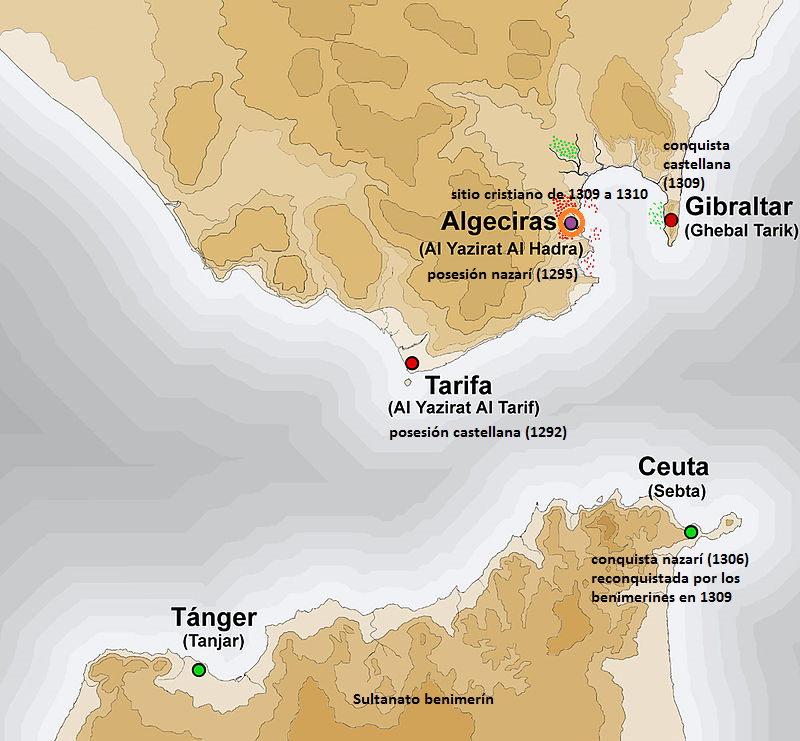
1306 to 1310

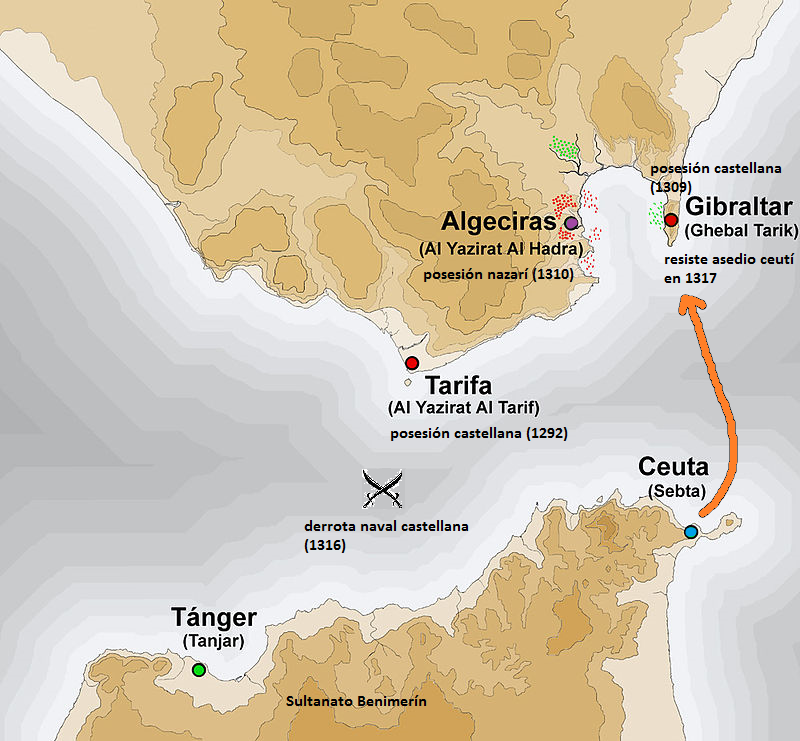
1310 to 1329

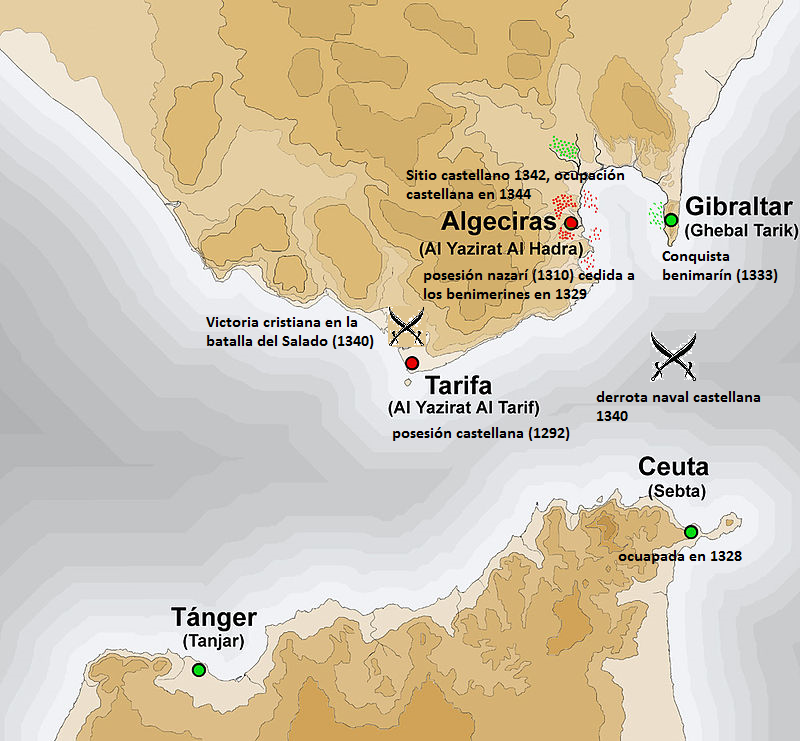
1329 to 1350
