= Alfonso Jofré Tenorio =

Spanish admiral (died 1340)

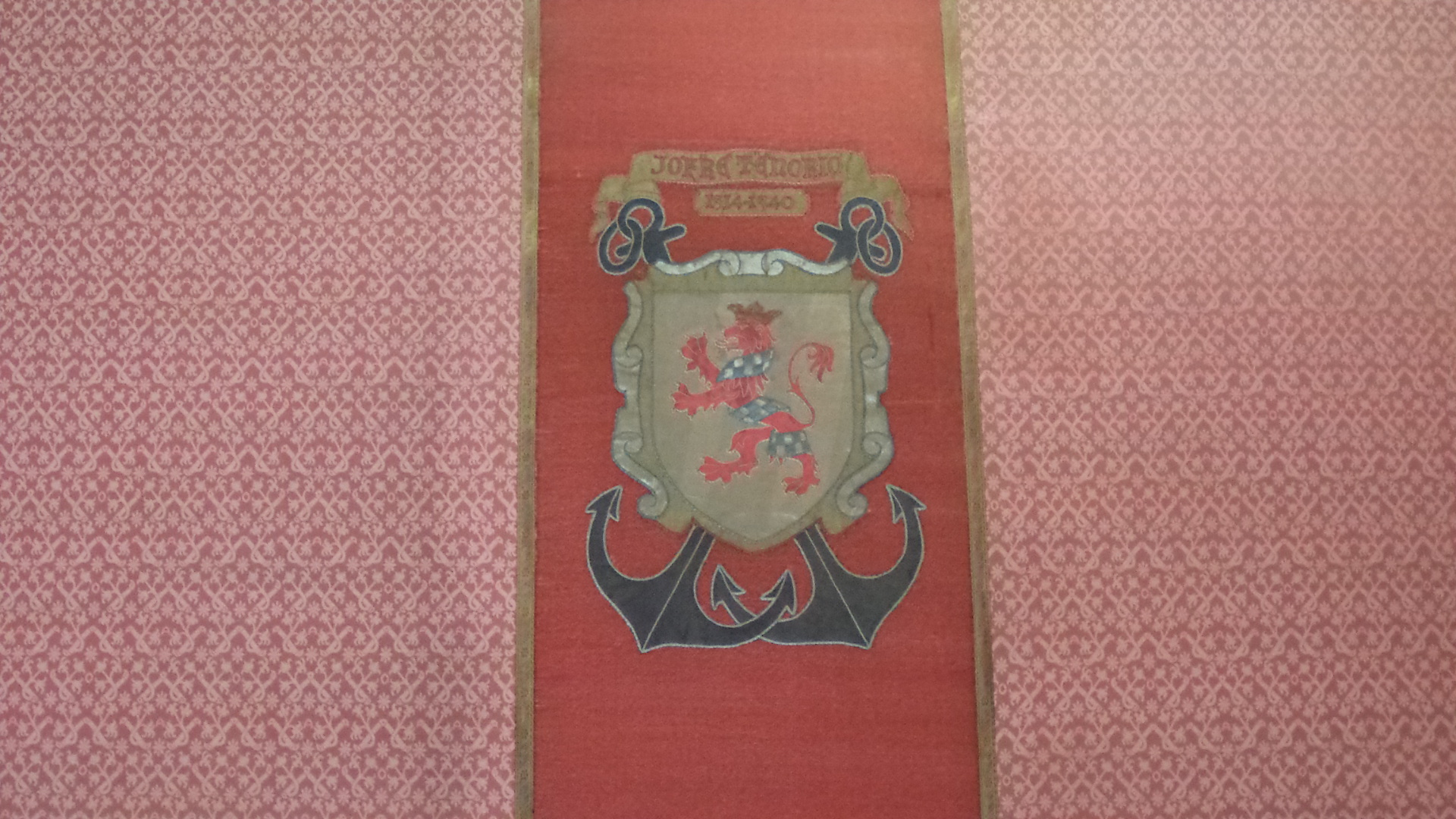
Jofré Tenorio's coat-of-arms in the Alcázar de Sevilla

Alfonso Jofré Tenorio (died 16 April 1340) was the Admiral of Castile from 1314 until his death. He participated in a war against the Emirate of Granada in 1316, and led a blockade in 1326 during which he defeated the Granadan-Marinid fleet. In 1333 he participated in the defense of Gibraltar against a Marinid-Granadan siege, but Castile was defeated and he signed a 1334 treaty that formalised the cession of the town. He died in a naval battle against the Marinid fleet of Abu al-Hasan Ali on the Strait of Gibraltar.
