= Abu Malik Abd al-Wahid =

Son of Marinid sultan of Morocco (died 1339)

Abu Malik Abd al-Wahid (Arabic: أبو عبدالملك عبدالواحد المريني) (died 1339) (also known as Abomelique) was a son of the Marinid sultan of Morocco, Abu al-Hasan Ali ibn Othman. Although he had lost an eye, Malik was a capable military commander and served as governor of Algeciras and the Marinids' principal general in Al Andalus. He captured Gibraltar from Castile in June 1333 and participated in his father's campaign against rebels in the Kingdom of Tlemcen the following year. He was killed by Castilian forces in 1339 after being ambushed on the way back from a raid against the Castilian-held town of Jerez de la Frontera.

== Capture of Gibraltar ==
Abu Malik Abd al-Wahid's role in Al Andalus began in 1332 when the newly crowned Abu al-Hasan responded to an appeal from Muhammed IV, the Nasrid Sultan of Granada, for assistance against Castile by sending his son and an army to help the Granadans. During 1332, Abu Malik oversaw the transportation of a force of some 7,000 men from Morocco to Algeciras. They marched on the Castilian-held fortified town of Gibraltar the following February and took it in the Third Siege of Gibraltar, which lasted nearly five months. A Castilian army under King Alfonso XI arrived too late to save the garrison but mounted the Fourth Siege of Gibraltar between June and August 1333 in an effort to regain it. Although the Castilians inflicted a significant defeat on Abu Malik's forces, killing around 500 men during a failed attempt by the Moors to ambush the Castilian army in the Sierra Carbonera north of Gibraltar, neither side was strong enough to prevail. The Castilians had to withdraw due to political problems at home and resupply difficulties, leaving Abu Malik's forces in continued control of Gibraltar.

Abu Malik, who by now called himself King of Ronda and Algeciras agreed a four-year truce with Alfonso as part of the peace agreement that ended the siege. It did not go into effect as Muhammed IV, who was also a party to the agreement, was assassinated the day after signing it by two Granadan nobles who feared that he had converted to Christianity. Abu Malik resumed hostilities against Castile, aided by the new Nasrid Sultan, Yusuf I. It might have developed into a wider war backed by Abu Malik's father Abu al-Hasan, but any intentions to expand the campaign had to be abandoned when the Zayyanid kingdom of Tlemcen (now part of Algeria) revolted against Moroccan rule. Abu Malik, Hassan, Yusuf I and Alfonso XI reached a fresh truce agreement in 1334 and Abu Malik was recalled to Morocco to aid his father against Tlemcen.

== Invasion of Castile and death ==
The truce expired in 1338, by which time the Moroccans had suppressed the Tlemcen revolt. Abu Malik returned to his capital at Ronda along with a substantial force – possibly as many as 5,000 cavalry with as many foot soldiers – sent to the Iberian Peninsula by his father. The kingdoms of Castile, Aragon and Portugal joined forces to deal with the renewed Moorish threat and blockaded the Strait of Gibraltar to obstruct the Marinid build-up. Alfonso XI mounted a series of chevauchées (mounted raids) deep into Marinid territory in 1339, targeting Ronda, Antequera and Archidona.

Abu Malik responded by mounting an invasion of Castilian territory, leading a raid against Medina-Sidonia before laying siege to Jerez de la Frontera. His forces also attacked Arcos de la Frontera and Lebrija. Although they failed to take any of the three towns, the Moors amassed a large quantity of booty from the surrounding countryside. They were on their way back to their own territory, laden down with loot, when they were ambushed by Castilian forces. The Moorish force was massacred, losing some 10,000 men killed or captured. Abu Malik was caught without armour or a horse and hid beside a stream, playing dead. He was killed when a Castilian soldier saw him move and ran him through with a spear.

== Bibliography ==
- Agrait, Nicolás (2010). Rogers, Clifford (ed.). The Oxford Encyclopedia of Medieval Warfare and Military Technology, Volume 1. Oxford: Oxford University Press. ISBN 9780195334036.
- Agrait, Nicolás (2012). "The Battle of Salado (1340) Revisited". In Rogers, Clifford; DeVries, Kelly; France, John (eds.). Journal of Medieval Military History: Volume X. Woodbridge, UK: Boydell Press. ISBN 9781843837473.
- Hills, George (1974). Rock of Contention: A history of Gibraltar. London: Robert Hale & Company. ISBN 0-7091-4352-4.
- Jackson, William G. F. (1986). The Rock of the Gibraltarians. Cranbury, NJ: Associated University Presses. ISBN 0-8386-3237-8.
