= Abu al-Hasan Ali ibn Uthman =

Marinid sultan (c.1297–1351)

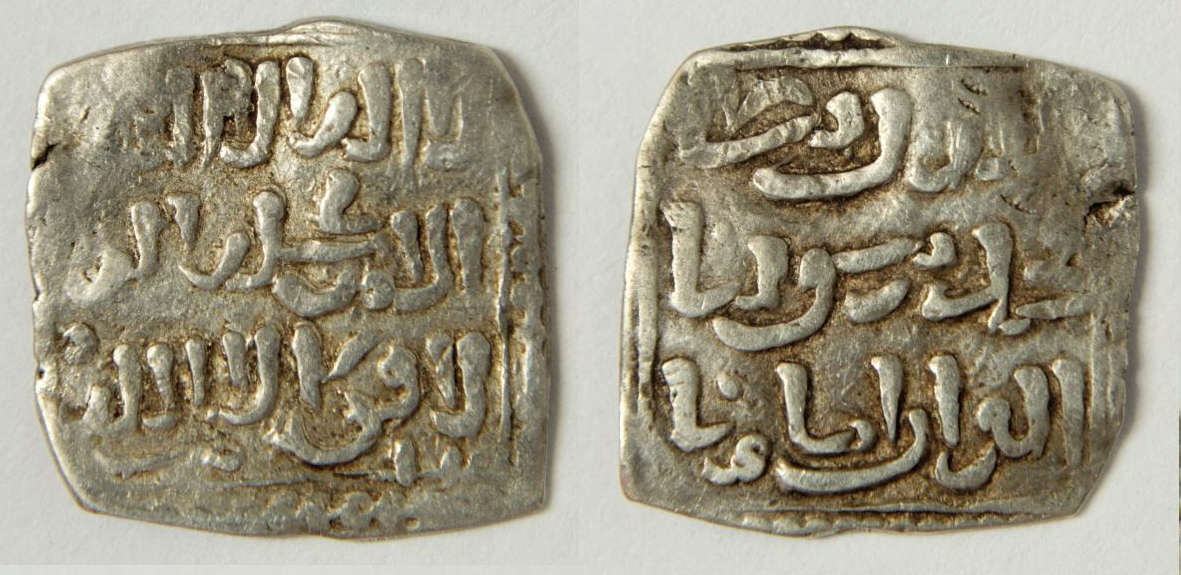
- Dirham minted under the reign of the Marinid ruler Abu al-Hasan ibn Uthman.

Marinid Sultan
- Reign: August 1331 – 1348
- Predecessor: Abu Sa'id Uthman II
- Successor: Abu Inan Faris
- Born: c. 1297; Fez
- Died: 24 May 1351 (aged 53–54); High Atlas
- Burial: Chellah
- Issue: Abu Inan Faris
Names
- Abū al-Ḥassan ʿAlī ibn ʿUthmān al-Marīni
- Dynasty: Marinid
- Father: Abu Sa'id Uthman II
- Religion: Islam

Abu al-Hasan Ali ibn Uthman (c. 1297 – 24 May 1351), (Arabic: أبو الحسن علي بن عثمان) was a sultan of the Marinid dynasty who reigned in parts of Morocco between 1331 and 1348. In 1333 he captured Gibraltar from the Castilians, although a later attempt to take Tarifa in 1339 ended in fiasco. In North Africa he extended his rule over Tlemcen and Hafsid Ifriqiya, which together covered the north of what is now Algeria and Tunisia. Under him the Marinid realms in the Maghreb briefly covered an area that rivalled that of the preceding Almohad Caliphate. However, he was forced to retreat due to a revolt of the Arab tribes, was shipwrecked, and lost many of his supporters. His son Abu Inan Faris seized power in Fes. Abu Al-Hasan died in exile in the High Atlas mountains.

== Early years ==
Abu al-Hasan was the son of Marinid ruler Abu Sa'id Uthman II. Al-Baydhaq says that his mother was a woman from Fes called Fatima. It is unknown whether she was a wife or a concubine. He had a dark complexion inherited from his sub Saharan mother, and was known as the 'Black Sultan'. He succeeded his father Abu Sa'id Uthman II in 1331. Abu al-Hasan married Fatima, daughter of the Hafsid ruler Abu Yahya Abu Bakr II of Ifriqiya, sealing an alliance between the Marinids and Hafsids against the Zayyanid dynasty of Tlemcen.

== Campaigns ==
=== Gibraltar ===
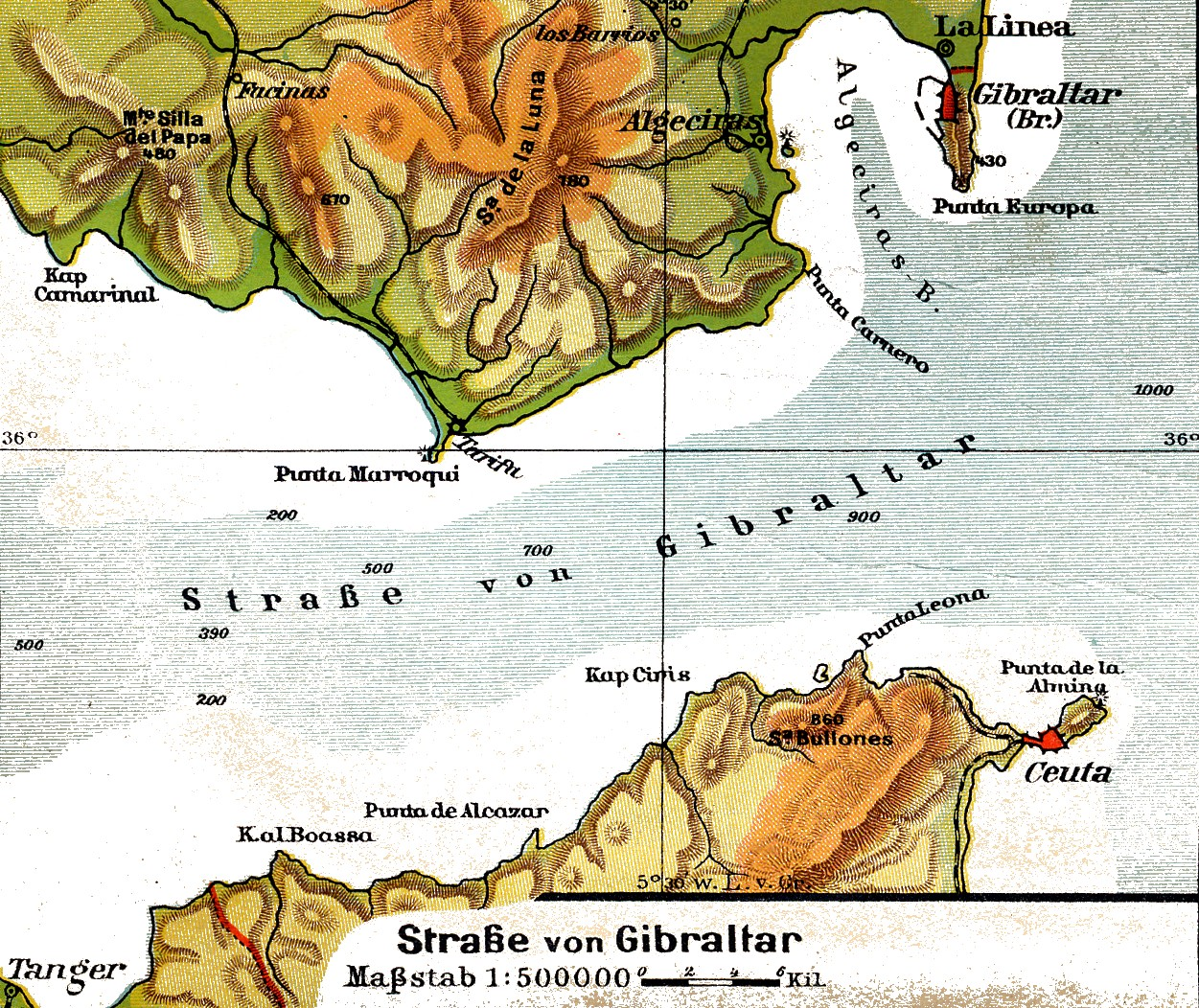
Strait of Gibraltar, with Ceuta in the southeast opposite Algeciras Bay and Gibraltar.

In 1309, Castilian troops under Ferdinand IV captured Gibraltar, then known as the Medinat al-Fath (City of Victory), from the Muslim-ruled Emirate of Granada. In 1333, responding to the appeal of Nasrid ruler Muhammad IV of Granada, Abu al-Hasan sent a Moroccan army to Algeciras under the command of his son Abd al-Malik Abd al-Wahid. A force of 7,000 men was transported across the Strait of Gibraltar to rendezvous with the forces of Muhammad IV of Granada at Algeciras in February 1333. The Castilians were distracted by the coronation of King Alfonso XI and were slow to respond to the invasion force, which was able to lay siege to Gibraltar before much of a response could be organised.

The situation in Gibraltar was desperate by mid-June. The food had run out and the townspeople and garrison had been reduced to eating their own shields, belts and shoes in an attempt to gain sustenance from the leather from which they were made. On 17 June 1333, Vasco Perez surrendered Gibraltar after agreeing terms with Abd al-Malik. The defenders were allowed to leave with honour as a mark of respect for their courage in defending the town for so long. The fall of Gibraltar was rapturously received back in Morocco; the Moorish chronicler Ibn Marzuq recorded that while he was studying in Tlemcen, his teacher announced to his class: "Rejoice, community of the faithful, because God has had the goodness to restore Gibraltar to us!" According to Ibn Marzuq, the jubilant students burst out into cries of praise, gave thanks and shed tears of joy.

The success of the Gibraltar campaign stoked fears in the Granadan court that the Marinids would become too influential, and provoked the assassination of Muhammad IV by resentful Granadan nobles only a few months later. However, Abu al-Hasan was not ready to invade the Iberian peninsula since he was engaged in hostilities with Tlemcen. Muhammad IV's brother and successor, Yusuf I of Granada maintained the alliance with the Marinid ruler. A peace treaty was signed at Fes on 26 February 1334 between Castile, Granada and Morocco with a four-year duration.

=== Tlemcen ===
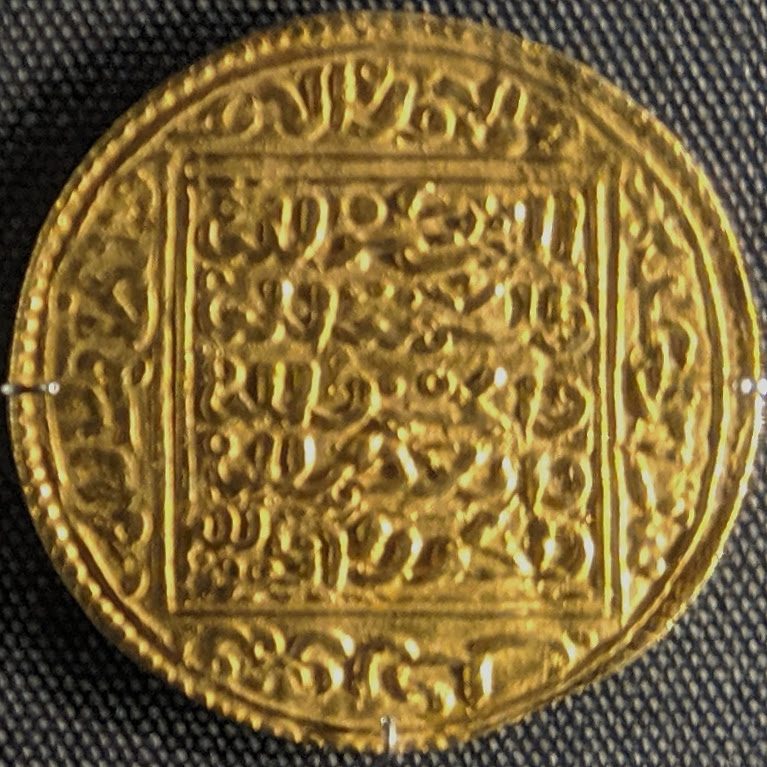
Dinar minted during his reign

The ruler of Tlemcen, Ibn Tashufin (r. 1318–1337), initiated hostilities against Ifriqiya, besieged Béjaïa, and sent an army into Tunisia that defeated the Hafsid king Abu Yahya Abu Bakr II, who fled to Constantine while the Zayyanids occupied Tunis.

Abu al-Hasan was married to a Hafsid princess, and in 1334 the Hafsids appealed to him for help, giving him a welcome excuse for invading his neighbour.

In early 1335, Marinid forces under Abu al-Hasan invaded Tlemcen from the west and dispatched a naval force to assist the Hafsids from the east. The Zayyanids were rolled back into the city of Tlemcen. The Marinid sultan Abu al-Hasan started a lengthy siege of Tlemcen, turning his siege camp into a veritable adjoining city.

In 1336 or 1337, Abu al-Hasan suspended the siege of Tlemcen to campaign in southern Morocco, where his troublesome brother, Abu Ali, who ruled an appanage at Sijilmassa, was threatening to divide the Marinid dominions.

In May 1337, after a two-year siege, Tlemcen finally fell to a Marinid assault. Ibn Tashufin died during the fighting. His brothers were captured and killed and the Sultanate of Tlemcen (covering roughly modern western half of Algeria) was annexed by the Marinids. Abu al-Hasan received delegates from Egypt, Granada, Tunis and Mali congratulating him on his victory, by which he had gained complete control of the trans-Saharan trade.

=== Tarifa ===
Flush from these victories, in 1339, Abu al-Hasan received an appeal from the Nasrid ruler Yusuf I of Granada to help drive back the Castilians. The assembly of a large Marinid invasion force in Morocco prompted the Castilian king Alfonso XI to bring to an end his quarrel with Afonso IV of Portugal.

In April 1340, a Castilian fleet of some 32 galleys under admiral Alonso Jofré Tenorio set out against the Marinid invasion fleet being outfitted at Ceuta. The Marinid fleet, under the command of Muhammad ibn Ali al-Azafi, destroyed the Castilian fleet in the naval battle of Gibraltar on 5 April 1340. The Castilian admiral Tenorio was killed during the engagement and only five Castilian galleys managed to make it safely out.

With the sea now clear for an invasion, Abu al-Hasan spent the rest of the summer calmly ferrying his troops and supplies across the straits to Algeciras. Abu al-Hasan crossed with the bulk of the Marinid forces in August 1340. The Marinid invasion force joined up with Granadan forces under Yusuf I in September, and together proceeded to lay siege to Tarifa.

A desperate Alfonso XI appealed to his father-in-law, the Portuguese king Afonso IV for assistance. In October 1340, a Portuguese fleet under Manuel Pessanha, supplemented by a leased Genoese fleet, managed to move into position off Tarifa and cut off the besiegers' supply line to Morocco. In the meantime, Afonso IV of Portugal led an army overland to join Alfonso XI of Castile near Seville, and together they moved against the besiegers at Tarifa. The Marinid-Nasrid forces were defeated at the Battle of Río Salado in October 1340, and Abu al-Hasan was forced to retreat back to Algeciras. After this defeat, Al-Hasan ended his campaigns in the Iberian Peninsula. A few years later, Alfonso XI of Castile had little difficulty taking Algeciras in March 1344.

=== Ifriqiya ===
In 1346 the Hafsid Sultan, Abu Bakr, died and a dispute over the succession ensued. Several Ifriqiyan parties appealed to the Marinid ruler for assistance. In a campaign in early 1347, Abu al-Hasan's Moroccan army swept through Ifriqiya and entered Tunis in September 1347. By uniting Morocco, Tlemcen and Ifriqiya, the Marinid ruler Abu al-Hasan effectively accomplished the conquest of dominions as great as the Almohad empire of the Maghreb, and the comparison was not lost on contemporaries.

== Revolt and death ==
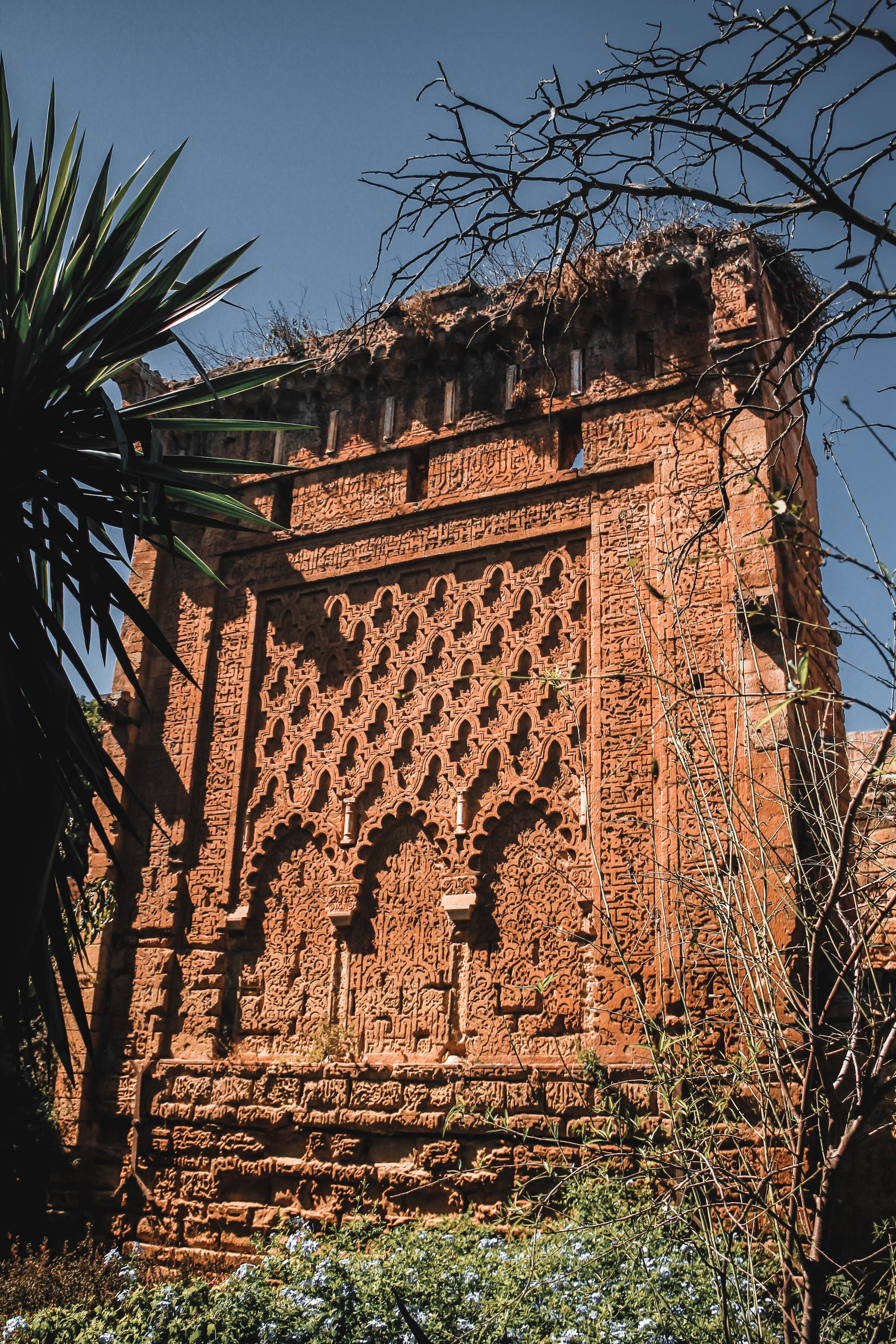
Ruins of his mausoleum in the Marinid necropolis of the Chellah archeological site.

However, Abu al-Hasan went too far in attempting to impose his authority over the Arab tribes. They revolted and in April 1348 defeated his army near Kairouan. His son, Abu Inan Faris, who had been serving as governor of Tlemcen, returned to Fes and declared that he was the sultan. Tlemcen and the central Maghreb revolted. The Zayyanid Abu Sa'id Uthman II was proclaimed king of Tlemcen.

Abu al-Hasan's fleet was wrecked on its homeward journey by a tempest off Bougie, and the once mighty sultan was left stranded in the heart of enemy territory. Abu al-Hasan escaped capture and made his way to join his partisans in Algiers. He managed to gather enough forces to attempt a march to recover Tlemcen, but was defeated by the resurgent Abdalwadid princes near the Chelif River.

As many of his former supporters defected, Abu al-Hasan was forced to proceed to Sijilmassa, in southern Morocco, which he hoped to use as a base to recover his sultanate. But Abu Inan's armies descended on the area, forcing Abu al-Hasan to flee with what remained of his supporters to Marrakesh. In May 1350, Abu Inan defeated Abu al-Hasan on the banks of the Oum er-Rebia. With Abu Inan on his heels, Abu al-Hasan fled into the high Atlas Mountains, taking refuge among the Hintata tribes. Broken, ill and without resources, the once-mighty Abu al-Hasan, finally agreed to abdicate in favour of Abu Inan in late 1350 or early 1351.

Abu al-Hasan died in May 1351, still in his Atlas mountain hideout. His body was transferred by Abu Inan, allegedly with great public mourning, to the Marinid necropolis at Chellah.

In 1352 Abu Inan Faris recaptured Tlemcen. He also reconquered the central Maghreb. He took Béjaïa in 1353 and Tunis in 1357, becoming master of Ifriqiya. In 1358 he was forced to return to Fes due to Arab opposition, where he was strangled to death by his vizier.
