= Alonso de Arcos =

Alcaide of Tarifa

Alonso de Arcos the first mayor of Gibraltar, was the alcaide (Military Governor) of Tarifa. In 1462, he along with Rodrigo Ponce de León, son and heir of the Count of Arcos, and Juan Alonso de Guzmán, Duke of Medina Sidonia, attacked and gained control of the town of Gibraltar in the Eighth Siege of Gibraltar. Gibraltar belonged then to the Nasrid Kingdom of Granada and with this takeover, Gibraltar was no longer in Muslim hands. Upon arriving at Gibraltar, Alonso's forces attempted to storm the town, but the Nasrid soldiers stationed at the garrison were able to hold back his troops. In the midst of deciding what next to attempt, Alonso was delivered a message from the garrison requesting that the soldiers be allowed to peacefully evacuate the garrison with their belongings, surrendering it.
