= Sierra Carbonera =

Small range of mountains in the Province of Cádiz in Spain

Coordinates: 36.205254°N 5.359716°W

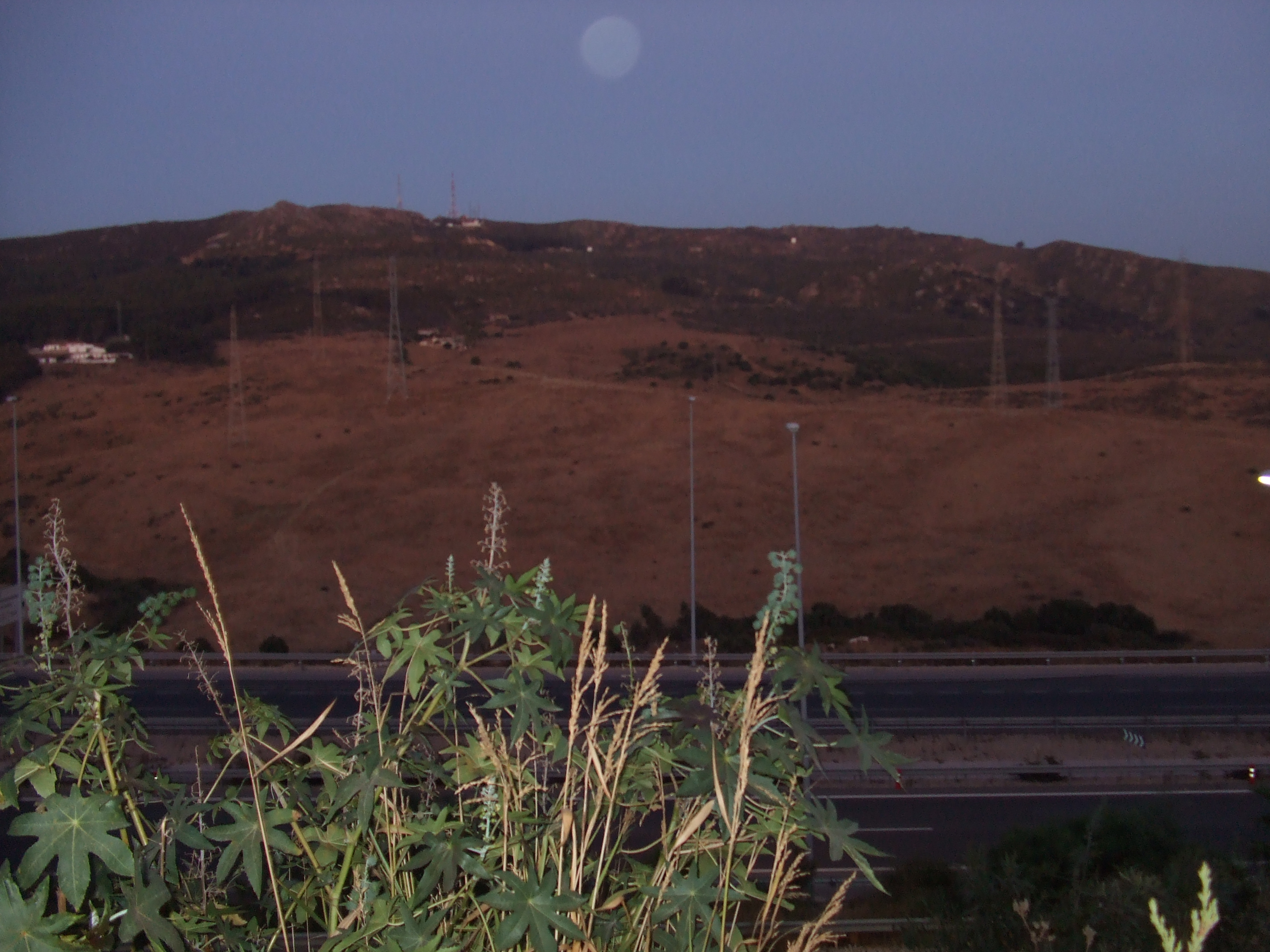
- Sierra Carbonera viewed from the Calle Herrería in San Roque

Highest point
- Elevation: 311 m (1,020 ft)

Geography
- Location: Province of Cádiz
- Country: Spain

The Sierra Carbonera is a small range of mountains located in the Province of Cádiz in Spain, at the boundary between the municipalities of San Roque and La Línea de la Concepción, north of the Rock of Gibraltar. It rises to a maximum altitude of 311 metres (1,020 ft) at the summit of Carboneras, which is occupied by a radio communications installation.

== Description ==
The Sierra Carbonera is noted for its fine views over the region, stretching on a clear day as far as Ceuta and Tetouan in Morocco on the far side of the Strait of Gibraltar. A 16th century watchtower stood on its highest summit until 1967, when it was demolished. The watchtower was known locally as Sillón de la Reina (Queen's Chair), reflecting a legend that it was used by Eleanor of Guzman, the famous lover of King Alfonso XI of Castile (who lived, however, 200 years before the tower was built).

The Sierra was originally covered with trees but these have been clear-cut, leaving the slopes denuded, due to large-scale logging for charcoal production. The name Carbonera reflects this former industry.
