= Third siege of Gibraltar =

1333 siege

Coordinates: 36°08′34″N 5°21′10″W

- Part of the Battle of the Strait during the Reconquista
| Date | February – June 1333 |
| Location | Gibraltar |
| Result | Marinid victory |
| Territorial changes | Conquest of Gibraltar by Marinids |

Belligerents
| Marinid Sultanate | Kingdom of Castile |

Commanders and leaders
| Abu al-Hasan Ali ibn Othman of Morocco; Abd al-Malik Abd al-Wahid; Muhammed IV of Granada | Alfonso XI of Castile; Juan Manuel, Prince of Villena; Don Vasco Perez de Meira |

The third siege of Gibraltar was mounted between February–June 1333 by a Moorish army under the prince Abd al-Malik Abd al-Wahid of Morocco. The fortified town of Gibraltar had been held by Castile since 1309, when it had been seized from the Moorish Emirate of Granada. The attack on Gibraltar was ordered by the recently crowned Marinid ruler Abu al-Hasan Ali ibn Othman in response to an appeal by the Nasrid ruler Muhammed IV of Granada. The onset of the siege took the Castilians by surprise. The stocks of food in Gibraltar were heavily depleted at the time due to the thievery of the town's governor, Vasco Perez de Meira, who had looted the money that was meant to have been spent on food for the garrison and to pay for the upkeep of the castle and fortifications. After over four months of siege and bombardment by Moorish catapults, the garrison and townspeople were reduced to near-starvation and surrendered to Abd al-Malik.

== Start of the siege ==
In 1309, Castilian troops under King Ferdinand IV captured Gibraltar, then known as Medinat al-Fatḥ (City of Victory), from the Muslim-ruled Emirate of Granada. Its fortifications were repaired and improved by the Castilians. In 1315, the Granadans attempted to retake Gibraltar in the brief and unsuccessful second siege of Gibraltar.

The alliance between the Nasrids of the Emirate of Granada and the Marinid Morocco had fallen into abeyance following the loss of Gibraltar. The accession of the Marinid sultan Abu al-Hasan Ali ibn Othman led to a renewal of the pact between the two Muslim states. A force of 7,000 men under the command of Abu al-Hasan's son, Abd al-Malik, was secretly transported across the Strait of Gibraltar to rendezvous with the forces of Muhammad IV of Granada at Algeciras in February 1333. The Castilians were distracted by the coronation of King Alfonso XI. They were slow to respond to the invasion force, which was able to lay siege to Gibraltar before much of a response could be organised.

Gibraltar was ill-prepared for this eventuality. Its governor, Vasco Pérez de Meira of Galicia, had looted the funds allocated by the crown to pay for food and maintenance of the town's defences, using it to buy land for himself near Jerez de la Frontera. He also misappropriated the food, sold it to the Moors, and kept the garrison understrength. The shipwreck of a grain ship off the Gibraltarian coast, only eight days before the siege began, gave the garrison a little extra food supply, but as events were to prove, it was not nearly enough.

The town consisted of a series of individually fortified districts that reached from the dockyard on the seafront to a castle several hundred feet up the slope of the Rock of Gibraltar. By the end of February, Abd al-Malik's forces had captured the dockyard and the area on the Rock above the castle, where he set up siege engines. Castilian attempts to organise a relief force were hampered by Granadan raids on their borders, which were intended to divert their attention. In addition, political disputes between Alfonso and his vassals delayed raising a land force to lift the siege. Although Alfonso had a naval force at his disposal under Admiral Alfonso Jofré Tenorio, the Moorish ships supporting the siege were positioned close inshore, where it was too dangerous to attempt an attack.

== Fall and capture of Gibraltar ==
It was not until June that Alfonso was able to put a relief force into the field. His senior advisers had argued against staging a relief expedition because it would mean fighting Granada and Fes, which they saw as too risky a venture. After eight days of arguments in Seville, Alfonso got his way and was able to persuade his rebellious vassal Juan Manuel, the Prince of Villena, to support him against the Moors. He marched his army to Jerez and camped by the Guadalete, four days' march from Gibraltar. It was already too late for the defenders.

The situation in Gibraltar was desperate by mid-June. The food had run out and the townspeople and garrison had been reduced to eating their shields, belts, and shoes to gain sustenance from the leather from which they were made. Admiral Jofre attempted to sling bags of flour into the town by firing them over the walls from ship-mounted catapults, but the Moors were able to drive the Castilian ships away. The Moors' catapults had caused severe damage to Gibraltar's defences, and the weakened garrison was in no shape to resist further.

On 17 June 1333, Vasco Perez surrendered Gibraltar after agreeing to terms with Abd al-Malik. It was reported that he had been hoarding food in his storerooms, enough to feed the whole besieged population for five days. He had been keeping several well-fed Moorish captives in his own house with the apparent intention of ransoming them. He fled to North Africa to escape punishment for his failures; as a chronicler of Alfonso XI of Castile wrote, "it was his duty either to deliver the fortress into the hands of his lord, the King, or die in its defence." He did neither and was condemned by the Castilians as a traitor. The other defenders were allowed to leave with honour as a mark of respect for their courage in defending the town for so long. The fall of Gibraltar was rapturously received back in Morocco; the Moorish chronicler ibn Marzuq recorded that while he was studying in Tlemcen, his teacher announced to his class: "Rejoice, community of the faithful, because God has had the goodness to restore Gibraltar to us!" According to ibn Marzuq, the jubilant students burst out into cries of praise, gave thanks and shed tears of joy.

== Bibliography ==
- Fa, Darren; Finlayson, Clive (2006). The Fortifications of Gibraltar. Oxford: Osprey Publishing. ISBN 1-84603016-1.
- Hills, George (1974). Rock of Contention: A History of Gibraltar. London: Robert Hale & Company. ISBN 0-7091-4352-4.
- O'Callaghan, Joseph F. (2011). The Gibraltar Crusade: Castile and the Battle for the Strait. University of Pennsylvania Press. ISBN 9780812243024.
