= Enrique Enríquez the Younger =

- Arms of Infante Henry of Castile.svg
- Died: 1366
- Occupation: Nobleman
- Known for: Lord of Villalba de los Barros

Enrique Enríquez the Younger (died 1366) was a nobleman of Castile, son of Enrique Enríquez the Elder. He was lord of Villalba de los Barros, Nogales, Almendral, La Parra, Begíjar and other towns. He was Adelantado Mayor of the border of Andalusia, chief justice of the King's House, Chief of the forces of the bishopric and Kingdom of Jaén, Mayor of Seville and Knight of the Band.

== Family origins ==
Enrique Enríquez the Younger was the son of Enrique Enríquez the Elder, nobleman of Castile and lord of Puebla de los Infantes, and Estefanía Rodríguez de Ceballos, Lady of Villalba de los Barros and of Vado de las Estacas. His father's parents were the Prince Henry of Castile the Senator, son of Ferdinand III of Castile, and the Lady Mayor Rodríguez Pecha. His maternal grandparents were Rodrigo González de Ceballos, mayor of Toledo and adelantado mayor of Murcia, and his wife, María Fernández de Caviedes, lady of Caviedes, Lamadrid and La Revilla.

== Youth ==
The birthdate of Enrique Enríquez the Younger is unknown. In 1307 his mother, Estefanía Rodríguez de Ceballos, ceded the lordship of Villalba de los Barros to her son, with the consent of his father. The grant was confirmed by a document issued in the city of Valladolid on 12 April 1320 by King Alfonso XI of Castile. The date when his father died is unknown, but must have occurred before 28 February 1323. On that date his wife recorded her state of widowhood in a document issued in the city of Seville, when she sold a house on her property.

== Reign of Alfonso XI of Castile ==
In 1331 Enrique Enríquez the Younger was made a Knight of the Band, an order that had been instituted by King Alfonso XI that year. Two years later, in 1333, the King gave him the town of Almendral, located in the present province of Badajoz, with all its terms and rents. On 19 September 1335 Alfonso XI was in the city of Toro and gave Enrique Enríquez the Younger, who held the post of chief justice of the king's house, Espechilla village, located in the Sevillian region of Aljarafe.

In 1336 the Castilian-Leonese troops under the command of Enrique Enríquez the Younger, together with those of Pedro Ponce de León the Elder, Lord of Marchena, and those of Juan Alonso Pérez de Guzmán y Coronel, lord of Sanlúcar de Barrameda, defeated the troops of King Alfonso IV of Portugal in the battle of Villanueva de Barcarrota. The victory forced the king of Portugal to raise the siege of Badajoz.

In 1340, acting as military commander of the bishopric of Jaén, he fought in the Battle of Río Salado, in which the Christian troops defeated the Muslims. After this battle King Alfonso XI gave Enrique Enríquez and his sons, Alonso and Fernando, the Order of Santiago. On 1 December 1341, Alfonso XI was in the town of Robledo de Chavela. He dismissed Enrique Enríquez the Younger from his position as Judge of Baeza, at the request of the council of that city. The king returned the privilege to appoint their own judges and mayors to the city of Baeza, as enshrined in the Charter of Cuenca that he had been granted to the city by King Ferdinand III of Castile. The same day, Alfonso XI took the village Mozo Begíjar from Enrique Enríquez, which had been given to him in 1341, and returned it to the council of Baeza.

In 1343 King Alfonso XI gave Enrique Enríquez the younger the village of La Parra, located in the present province of Badajoz. In 1344 he took possession of the town of Nogales, which had been sold in 1340 to Alfonso XI by Lorenzo Vázquez de la Fuenteseca for 70,000 maravedis, and that the king had then given to Pedro Carrillo. The latter, being in need of resources to take part in the war against Muslims, requested a loan of 40,000 maravedis from Enrique Enríquez the Younger and, as security for loan repayment, gave the town of Nogales. In 1344 the town finally passed into the hands of Enrique Enriquez, because of Pedro Carrillo's inability to repay the loan. Besides the estates he inherited and those donated by the king, Enrique Enriquez acquired a number of lands in the frontier region of Tierra de Barros, in order to increase his income and revenue and round out his possessions. These lands were in the regions of Salvatierra de los Barros, La Parra, and the administrative district of Badajoz.

Enrique Enríquez the Younger acted as chief justice of the King's House between March 1345 and March 1348.

== Reign of Peter of Castile ==
On 19 May 1358 he was appointed adelantado mayor of the Andalusia border by King Peter of Castile, while leaving the office of mayor of Seville. He replaced Fadrique Alfonso de Castilla, the illegitimate son of King Alfonso XI.

In 1361 the Muslims of Granada invaded the kingdom of Castile and León with six hundred knights and two thousand foot soldiers, and burned the town of Peal de Becerro. When Enrique Enríquez the Younger, Diego García de Padilla, Master of the Order of Calatrava, and Men Rodríguez de Biedma, military leader of the bishopric of Jaen, who were in the city of Úbeda, became aware of the invasion, they left that city along with the knights of its council and those of other towns, and went to occupy the crossings of the Guadiana Menor River. Later in the Battle of Linuesa, fought on 21 December 1361, the Christian troops defeated the Grenadans. The Muslims were completely defeated, with many of them dead or prisoners, and lost the booty they had seized during their raid. Later, King Pedro I took the Muslims who had been captured and promised to pay three hundred maravedis for each. However, the king did not pay the amount stipulated for the captives, causing the anger of men who had taken part in the campaign, who began to suspect the king.

On 15 January 1362 Enrique Enríquez the Younger fought against Muslim troops in the Battle of Guadix, in which the Muslims were victorious. In this battle, which was a disaster for the troops of the Kingdom of Castile and Leon, the master of the Order of Calatrava, Diego García de Padilla, was captured by the Muslims, but a few days later was released by Muhammed VI, Sultan of Granada. On 29 May 1364 King Peter of Castile ordered the city council of Murcia and Enrique Enriquez the Younger, who still held the post of adelantado mayor of the frontier of Andalusia, that they would provide what was needed to Pedro Fernández el Niño, adelantado mayor of the kingdom of Murcia, who was resisting inside the castle of Alicante, which had been conquered by the Aragonese for Pedro.

As adelantado mayor of the Andalusia frontier and senior leader bishopric and kingdom of Jaén, on 28 June 1364 he ordered the council of the city of Murcia to send eighty horsemen and a hundred laborers to the city of Elche, with spearmen and archers, and to advance with them to the city of Alicante. On 16 August 1364 Enrique Enríquez the Younger gave orders to the council of the city of Murcia that Alfonso Pérez de Guzmán, along with men of arms of the city of Murcia, were to cut down the orchard of Orihuela, who was among the domains of Pedro IV of Aragon.

Enrique Enríquez the Younger died before 20 March 1366. On his death, much of the lands and lordships that he had assembled in the territory of the present province of Badajoz became owned by one of his daughters, Leonor Enríquez, who received on the death of her father, among others, the towns of Nogales and Villalba de los Barros, together with all the lands of their terms, which had been priced at 170,000 maravedis.

== Burial ==
After his death, the body of Enrique Enríquez the Younger was buried in the monastery of San Francisco in Seville. The monastery was looted, desecrated and burned by French troops during the Spanish War of Independence and later demolished in the year 1841. Several of his relatives were buried in the same monastery.

== Wives and children ==
Enrique Enríquez the Younger first married Juana de Guzmán, daughter of Pedro Núñez de Guzmán, nobleman of Castile, and Juana Ponce de León y Meneses. His first wife was a maternal granddaughter of King Alfonso IX of Leon, and sister of Leonor de Guzmán, mistress of Alfonso XI of Castile and mother of Henry II of Castile. Two children were born from this marriage:

- Alonso Enríquez de Guzmán. He was buried in the monastery of San Francisco in Seville.
- Fernando Enríquez de Guzmán. Adelantado mayor of the border of Andalusia. He married Sancha Ponce de Cabrera, daughter of Juan Ponce de Cabrera, lord of Cabra, and granddaughter of King Alfonso IX of León. He was buried in the monastery of San Francisco in Seville.

Enrique Enríquez contracted a second marriage with Urraca Ponce de León, daughter of Pedro Ponce de León y Meneses, Lord of Puebla de Asturias, Cangas and Tineo, Lord Steward of King Ferdinand IV of Castile, and Adelantado mayor of the border Andalusia, and of Sancha Gil de Braganza. (Note: See the partition deed dated 13 November 1344 of the assets of Pedro Ponce de Leon and his wife Sancha among his children: Elizabeth, widow of Pedro Fernandez de Castro, Rodrigo Ponce de Leon, and Doña Urraca Ponce de Leon, married to Enrique Enriquez, chief justice of King Alfonso XI.) One daughter was born to this marriage:

- Leonor Enríquez y Ponce de León, Lady of Melgar, Villalba de los Barros, Lahiguera, Jódar, and Nogales, married for the first time to Alonso Pérez de Guzmán y Osorio, III lord of Sanlúcar de Barrameda, and married a second time to Fernando Ruiz de Castro, Lord of Lemos and Sarria, and lieutenant of King Pedro the Cruel.

Enrique Enríquez contracted a third marriage to Teresa de Haro, daughter of Alfonso López de Haro, Lord of the Cameros, and of Eleanor of Saldana. One daughter was born from this marriage:

- Isabel Enríquez de Haro married Garci III Fernández Manrique de Lara, Castilian nobleman and lord of Estar and of San Martín de Elines. Their descendants include the Counts of Castañeda and Marquises of Aguilar de Campo.

He also had two natural children with a woman named Sevilla.
