= December 21 =

December 21 this year in various calendars
- Monday, 21 December 2026
Akan	Nkyidwo
Armenian	4 Arach 1476
Aztec	Tozoztontli 20, 8 Ācatl
Babylonian	11 Kislimu, 2337 SE
Balinese pawukon	Luang, Pepet, Kajeng, Jaya, Paing, Urukung, Coma of Warigadian, Guru, Gigis, Duka
Bengali	6 Poush, BS 1433
Chinese	Yin Earth Snake・Roof Mansion; Fire Horse Year, Month 11, Day 13 (Daxue, 1 day until Dongzhi)
Common Era	21 December 2026 CE
Coptic	12 Koiak, AM 1743
Egyptian	9 Pachon, 2775 NE
Ethiopian	12 Tākḫśāś, 2019 Amätä Məhrät
French Republican	Décade III, Décadi de Frimaire de l'Année 235 de la République
Gregorian	21 December, AD 2026
Hebrew	11 Tevet, AM 5787
Hindu	Bharaṇī・Śiva; Solar: 6 Pauṣa, 1948 SE; Lunisolar: Dvādaśī, Śukla pakṣa of Mārgaśīrṣa, 2083 VE; Rāudra・5127 KY・1,872,930
Icelandic	Mánudagur, 29 Ýlir 2026
Islamic	11 Rajab, AH 1448 (using tabular method)
ISO week date	2026-W52-1
Japanese	13 Shimotsuki, Reiwa 8 (Taisetsu, 1 day until Tōji)
Julian	8 December, AD 2026 (AM 7535)
Julian day	2461396
Korean	13 Jwidal, 4359 DE
Maya	13.0.14.3.13; 6 Kankin, 8 Ben
Roman	ante diem VI Idus Decembres, MMDCCLXXIX AUC
Solar Hijri	30 Azar, SH 1405
Tibetan	12 mgo, me pho rta 2153 or 1772 or 1000

<<	December					>>
Su	Mo	Tu	We	Th	Fr	Sa
		1	2	3	4	5
6	7	8	9	10	11	12
13	14	15	16	17	18	19
20	21	22	23	24	25	26
27	28	29	30	31
2026

December 21 in recent years
2025 (Sunday)
2024 (Saturday)
2023 (Thursday)
2022 (Wednesday)
2021 (Tuesday)
2020 (Monday)
2019 (Saturday)
2018 (Friday)
2017 (Thursday)
2016 (Wednesday)

December 21 is the 355th day of the year (356th in leap years) in the Gregorian calendar; 10 days remain until the end of the year.

== Events ==
=== Pre-1600 ===
- AD 69 – The Roman Senate declares Vespasian emperor of Rome, the last in the Year of the Four Emperors.
- 1124 – Pope Honorius II is consecrated, having been elected after the controversial dethroning of Pope-Elect Celestine II.
- 1140 – After a siege of several weeks, the city of Weinsberg and its castle surrender to Conrad III of Germany.
- 1237 – The city of Ryazan is sacked by the Mongol army of Batu Khan.
- 1361 – The Battle of Linuesa is fought in the context of the Spanish Reconquista between the forces of the Emirate of Granada and the combined army of the Kingdom of Castile and of Jaén resulting in a Castilian victory.
- 1598 – Battle of Curalaba: The revolting Mapuche, led by cacique Pelentaru, inflict a major defeat on Spanish troops in southern Chile.

=== 1601–1900 ===
- 1620 – Plymouth Colony: William Bradford and the Mayflower Pilgrims land near what is now known as Plymouth Rock in Plymouth, Massachusetts.
- 1812 – The second earthquake to hit southern California in 13 days causes severe damage in Santa Barbara and Ventura.
- 1826 – American settlers in Nacogdoches, Mexican Texas, declare their independence, starting the Fredonian Rebellion.
- 1832 – Egyptian–Ottoman War: Egyptian forces decisively defeat Ottoman troops at the Battle of Konya.
- 1844 – The Rochdale Society of Equitable Pioneers commences business at its cooperative in Rochdale, England, starting the Cooperative movement.
- 1861 – Medal of Honor: Public Resolution 82, containing a provision for a Navy Medal of Valor, is signed into law by President Abraham Lincoln.
- 1872 – Challenger expedition: HMS Challenger, commanded by Captain George Nares, sails from Portsmouth, England.
- 1879 – the fictional character of Nora Helmer is first portrayed by Betty Hennings at a showing of A Doll's House at the Royal Danish Theatre.
- 1883 – The Royal Canadian Dragoons and The Royal Canadian Regiment, the first Permanent Force cavalry and infantry regiments of the Canadian Army, are formed.

=== 1901–present ===
- 1907 – The Chilean Army commits a massacre of at least 2,000 striking saltpeter miners in Iquique, Chile.
- 1910 – An underground explosion at the Hulton Bank Colliery No. 3 Pit in Over Hulton, Westhoughton, England, kills 344 miners.
- 1919 – American anarchist Emma Goldman is deported to Russia.
- 1923 – United Kingdom and Nepal formally sign an agreement of friendship, called the Nepal–Britain Treaty of 1923, which superseded the Treaty of Sugauli signed in 1816.
- 1934 – Lieutenant Kijé, one of Sergei Prokofiev's best-known works, premiered.
- 1941 – World War II: A Thai-Japanese Pact of Alliance is signed.
- 1946 – An 8.1 M_{w} earthquake and subsequent tsunami in Nankaidō, Japan, kills over 1,300 people and destroys over 38,000 homes.
- 1963 – "Bloody Christmas" begins in Cyprus, ultimately resulting in the displacement of 25,000–30,000 Turkish Cypriots and destruction of more than 100 villages.
- 1965 – International Convention on the Elimination of All Forms of Racial Discrimination is adopted.
- 1967 – Louis Washkansky, the first man to undergo a human-to-human heart transplant, dies in Cape Town, South Africa, having lived for 18 days after the transplant.
- 1968 – Apollo program: Apollo 8 is launched from the Kennedy Space Center, placing its crew on a lunar trajectory for the first visit to another celestial body by humans.
- 1973 – The Geneva Conference on the Arab–Israeli conflict opens.
- 1979 – Lancaster House Agreement: An independence agreement for Rhodesia is signed in London by Lord Carrington, Sir Ian Gilmour, Robert Mugabe, Joshua Nkomo, Bishop Abel Muzorewa and S.C. Mundawarara.
- 1988 – A bomb explodes on board Pan Am Flight 103 over Lockerbie, Dumfries and Galloway, Scotland, killing 270. This is to date the deadliest air disaster to occur on British soil.
- 1991 – Dissolution of the Soviet Union: The leaders of 11 now effectively autonomous Soviet republics sign the Alma-Ata Protocol establishing the Commonwealth of Independent States in place of the collapsing Soviet Union.
- 1992 – A Dutch DC-10, flight Martinair MP 495, crashes at Faro Airport, Portugal, killing 56.
- 1995 – The city of Bethlehem passes from Israeli to Palestinian control.
- 1999 – The Spanish Civil Guard intercepts a van loaded with 950 kg of explosives that ETA intended to use to blow up Torre Picasso in Madrid, Spain.
- 1999 – Cubana de Aviación Flight 1216 overshoots the runway at La Aurora International Airport, killing 18.
- 2004 – Iraq War: A suicide bomber kills 22 at the forward operating base next to the main U.S. military airfield at Mosul, Iraq, the single deadliest suicide attack on American soldiers in Iraq.
- 2012 – 2012 phenomenon: Festivities are held in parts of Mesoamerica to commemorate the conclusion of b'ak'tun 13, a roughly 5,126-year-long cycle in the Mesoamerican Long Count Calendar whose passing many New Age spiritualists had earlier held to portend a variety of cataclysmic or transformative events.
- 2020 – A great conjunction of Jupiter and Saturn occurs, with the two planets separated in the sky by 0.1 degrees. This is the closest conjunction between the two planets since 1623.
- 2022 – A Vega C rocket carrying two Pléiades Neo satellites fails after liftoff.
- 2023 – Fourteen people are killed and 25 others injured during a mass shooting at Charles University in Prague, Czech Republic.

== Births ==
=== Pre-1600 ===
- 968 – Minamoto no Yorinobu, Japanese samurai (died 1048)
- 1401 – Masaccio, Italian painter (died 1428)
- 1468 – William Conyers, 1st Baron Conyers, English baron (died 1524)
- 1505 – Thomas Wriothesley, 1st Earl of Southampton, English politician (died 1550)
- 1538 – Luigi d'Este, Catholic cardinal (died 1586)
- 1542 – Thomas Allen, English mathematician and astrologer (died 1632)
- 1550 – Man Singh I, Mughal noble (died 1614)
- 1596 – Peter Mohyla, Ruthenian Orthodox metropolitan and saint (died 1646)

=== 1601–1900 ===
- 1603 – Roger Williams, English minister, theologian, and politician, 9th President of the Colony of Rhode Island (died 1684)
- 1615 – Benedict Arnold, Rhode Island colonial governor (died 1678)
- 1672 – Benjamin Schmolck, German pastor and composer (died 1737)
- 1714 – John Bradstreet, Canadian-English general (died 1774)
- 1728 – Hermann Raupach, German harpsichord player and composer (died 1778)
- 1778 – Anders Sandøe Ørsted, Danish jurist and politician, 3rd Prime Minister of Denmark (died 1860)
- 1795 – Jack Russell, English priest, hunter, and dog breeder (died 1883)
- 1795 – Leopold von Ranke, German historian, author, and academic (died 1886)
- 1803 – Achille Vianelli, Italian painter and academic (died 1894)
- 1804 – Benjamin Disraeli, English lawyer and politician, Prime Minister of the United Kingdom (died 1881)
- 1805 – Thomas Graham, Scottish chemist and academic (died 1869)
- 1811 – Archibald Tait, Scottish-English archbishop (died 1882)
- 1815 – Thomas Couture, French painter and educator (died 1879)
- 1820 – William H. Osborn, American businessman (died 1894)
- 1830 – Bartolomé Masó, Cuban soldier and politician (died 1907)
- 1832 – John H. Ketcham, American general and politician (died 1906)
- 1840 – Ernest de Munck, Belgian cellist and composer (died 1915)
- 1840 – Namık Kemal, Turkish journalist, playwright, and activist (died 1888)
- 1843 – Thomas Bracken, Irish-New Zealander journalist, poet, and politician (died 1898)
- 1850 – Zdeněk Fibich, Czech composer and poet (died 1900)
- 1851 – Thomas Chipman McRae, American lawyer and politician, 26th Governor of Arkansas (died 1929)
- 1857 – Joseph Carruthers, Australian politician, 16th Premier of New South Wales (died 1932)
- 1859 – Gustave Kahn, French poet and critic (died 1936)
- 1866 – Maud Gonne, Irish nationalist and political activist (died 1953)
- 1868 – George W. Fuller, American chemist and engineer (died 1934)
- 1872 – Trevor Kincaid, Canadian-American zoologist and academic (died 1970)
- 1872 – Lorenzo Perosi, Italian priest and composer (died 1956)
- 1872 – Albert Payson Terhune, American journalist and author (died 1942)
- 1876 – Jack Lang, Australian lawyer and politician, 23rd Premier of New South Wales (died 1975)
- 1877 – Jaan Sarv, Estonian mathematician and scholar (died 1954)
- 1878 – Jan Łukasiewicz, Polish-Irish mathematician and philosopher (died 1956)
- 1884 – María Cadilla, Puerto Rican writer, educator, women's rights activist (died 1951)
- 1885 – Frank Patrick, Canadian ice hockey player and coach (died 1960)
- 1888 – Jean Bouin, French runner and rugby player (died 1914)
- 1889 – Sewall Wright, American geneticist and biologist (died 1988)
- 1890 – Hermann Joseph Muller, American geneticist and biologist, Nobel Prize laureate (died 1967)
- 1891 – John William McCormack, American lawyer and politician, 53rd Speaker of the United States House of Representatives (died 1980)
- 1892 – Walter Hagen, American golfer (died 1969)
- 1892 – Rebecca West, English journalist and author (died 1983)
- 1896 – Konstantin Rokossovsky, Marshal of the Soviet Union during World War II (died 1968)
- 1900 – Luis Arturo González López, Guatemalan supreme court judge and briefly acting president (died 1965)

=== 1901–present ===
- 1905 – Käte Fenchel, German mathematician (died 1983)
- 1905 – Anthony Powell, English author (died 2000)
- 1909 – Seichō Matsumoto, Japanese journalist and author (died 1992)
- 1911 – Josh Gibson, American baseball player (died 1947)
- 1913 – Arnold Friberg, American illustrator and painter (died 2010)
- 1914 – Frank Fenner, Australian microbiologist and virologist (died 2010)
- 1917 – Heinrich Böll, German novelist and short story writer, Nobel Prize laureate (died 1985)
- 1918 – Donald Regan, American colonel and politician, 11th White House Chief of Staff (died 2003)
- 1918 – Kurt Waldheim, Austrian colonel and politician; 9th President of Austria (died 2007)
- 1919 – Doug Young, American voice actor (died 2018)
- 1920 – Alicia Alonso, Cuban ballerina and choreographer, founded the Cuban National Ballet (died 2019)
- 1920 – Adele Goldstine, American computer programmer (died 1964)
- 1920 – Iris Cummings, American swimmer and aviator (died 2025)
- 1922 – Itubwa Amram, Nauruan pastor and politician (died 1989)
- 1922 – Cécile DeWitt-Morette, French mathematician and physicist (died 2017)
- 1922 – Paul Winchell, American actor, voice artist, and ventriloquist (died 2005)
- 1923 – Wat Misaka, American basketball player (died 2019)
- 1926 – Champ Butler, American singer (died 1992)
- 1926 – Arnošt Lustig, Czech author and playwright (died 2011)
- 1926 – Joe Paterno, American football player and coach (died 2012)
- 1927 – Charles Bailleul, French linguist and missionary (died 2026)
- 1930 – Phil Roman, American animator
- 1932 – U. R. Ananthamurthy, Indian author, poet, and critic (died 2014)
- 1932 – Edward Hoagland, American author and critic
- 1933 – Jackie Hendriks, Jamaican cricketer
- 1933 – Robert Worcester, American businessman and academic, founded MORI (died 2025)
- 1934 – Giuseppina Leone, Italian sprinter
- 1934 – Hanif Mohammad, Pakistani cricketer (died 2016)
- 1935 – John G. Avildsen, American director, producer, and cinematographer (died 2017)
- 1935 – Lorenzo Bandini, Italian racing driver (died 1967)
- 1935 – Phil Donahue, American talk show host and producer (died 2024)
- 1935 – Stela Popescu, Romanian actress (died 2017)
- 1935 – Edward Schreyer, Canadian academic and politician, Governor General of Canada
- 1935 – Janet Metcalf, American politician (died 2025)
- 1937 – Jane Fonda, American actress and activist
- 1938 – Larry Bryggman, American actor
- 1939 – Lloyd Axworthy, Canadian academic and politician, 2nd Canadian Minister of Foreign Affairs
- 1939 – Wafic Saïd, Syrian-Saudi Arabian financier, businessman and philanthropist
- 1940 – Frank Zappa, American singer-songwriter, guitarist, composer and producer (died 1993)
- 1942 – Hu Jintao, Chinese engineer and politician, 5th Paramount leader of China
- 1942 – Carla Thomas, American singer
- 1943 – Albert Lee, English guitarist and songwriter
- 1943 – Walter Spanghero, French rugby player
- 1944 – Michael Tilson Thomas, American pianist, composer, and conductor (died 2026)
- 1944 – Zheng Xiaoyu, Chinese diplomat (died 2007)
- 1945 – Doug Walters, Australian cricketer
- 1946 – Roy Karch, American director, producer, and screenwriter
- 1946 – Carl Wilson, American singer-songwriter and guitarist (died 1998)
- 1947 – Paco de Lucía, Spanish guitarist, songwriter, and producer (died 2014)
- 1948 – Barry Gordon, American actor and voice artist; longest-serving president of the Screen Actors Guild (1988–95)
- 1948 – Samuel L. Jackson, American actor and producer
- 1948 – Dave Kingman, American baseball player
- 1949 – Thomas Sankara, Burkinabé captain and politician, 5th President of Burkina Faso (died 1987)
- 1949 – Nikolaos Sifounakis, Greek lawyer and politician
- 1950 – Jeffrey Katzenberg, American screenwriter and producer, co-founded DreamWorks Animation
- 1950 – Max Maven, American magician and mentalist (died 2022)
- 1950 – Lillebjørn Nilsen, Norwegian singer-songwriter and guitarist (died 2024)
- 1951 – Steve Perryman, English footballer and manager
- 1952 – Joaquín Andújar, Dominican baseball player (died 2015)
- 1952 – Dennis Boutsikaris, American actor
- 1952 – Steve Furniss, American swimmer
- 1953 – András Schiff, Hungarian-English pianist and conductor
- 1953 – Betty Wright, American singer-songwriter (died 2020)
- 1954 – Chris Evert, American tennis player and coach
- 1955 – Jane Kaczmarek, American actress
- 1955 – Kazuyuki Sekiguchi, Japanese singer-songwriter and bass player
- 1956 – Dave Laut, American shot putter (died 2009)
- 1957 – Ray Romano, American actor, producer, and screenwriter
- 1957 – Tony Lewis, English singer and songwriter (died 2020)
- 1958 – Tamara Bykova, Russian high jumper
- 1959 – Florence Griffith Joyner, American sprinter and actress (died 1998)
- 1959 – Krishnamachari Srikkanth, Indian cricketer
- 1960 – Sherry Rehman, Pakistani journalist, politician, and diplomat, 25th Pakistan Ambassador to the United States
- 1961 – Ryuji Sasai, Japanese bass player and composer
- 1963 – Govinda, Indian actor, singer, and politician
- 1964 – Kunihiko Ikuhara, Japanese director and illustrator
- 1964 – Joe Kocur, Canadian ice hockey player and coach
- 1965 – Glenn Coleman, Australian rugby league player
- 1965 – Andy Dick, American actor and comedian
- 1965 – Anke Engelke, Canadian-German actress, director, and screenwriter
- 1966 – Michelle Hurd, American actress
- 1966 – William Ruto, 5th President of Kenya
- 1966 – Kiefer Sutherland, British-Canadian actor, director, and producer
- 1967 – Terry Mills, American basketball player and coach
- 1967 – Mikheil Saakashvili, Georgian lawyer and politician, 3rd President of Georgia
- 1969 – Julie Delpy, French model, actress, director, and screenwriter
- 1969 – Mihails Zemļinskis, Latvian footballer, coach, and manager
- 1971 – Matthieu Chedid, French singer-songwriter and guitarist
- 1971 – Natalie Grant, American singer-songwriter and author
- 1972 – Y. S. Jaganmohan Reddy, Indian politician, 17th Chief Minister of Andhra Pradesh
- 1973 – Irakli Alasania, Georgian colonel and politician, Georgian Minister of Defense
- 1973 – Matías Almeyda, Argentine footballer and manager
- 1974 – Karrie Webb, Australian golfer
- 1975 – Paloma Herrera, Argentine ballerina
- 1977 – Buddy Carlyle, American baseball player
- 1977 – Corey Collymore, Barbadian cricketer
- 1977 – Leon MacDonald, New Zealand rugby player
- 1977 – Emmanuel Macron, French politician, 25th President of France
- 1977 – Freddy Sanchez, American baseball player
- 1978 – Emiliano Brembilla, Italian swimmer
- 1978 – Charles Dera, American pornographic actor, dancer, model, and mixed martial arts fighter
- 1978 – Shaun Morgan, South African musician, singer, and guitarist
- 1978 – Rutina Wesley, American actress
- 1979 – Steve Montador, Canadian ice hockey player (died 2015)
- 1981 – Marta Fernández, Spanish basketball player
- 1981 – Cristian Zaccardo, Italian footballer
- 1982 – Primo Colón, Puerto Rican wrestler
- 1982 – Philip Humber, American baseball player
- 1982 – Tom Payne, English actor
- 1983 – Taylor Teagarden, American baseball player
- 1983 – Steven Yeun, American actor
- 1985 – Tom Sturridge, English actor
- 1987 – Khris Davis, American baseball player
- 1988 – Danny Duffy, American baseball player
- 1988 – Perri Shakes-Drayton, English sprinter and hurdler
- 1989 – Mark Ingram II, American football player
- 1989 – Tamannaah, Indian actress
- 1991 – Nic Maddinson, Australian cricketer
- 1991 – Otis, American wrestler
- 1991 – Riccardo Saponara, Italian footballer
- 1992 – Ha Ha Clinton-Dix, American football player
- 1992 – Jamie Oleksiak, Canadian ice hockey player
- 1994 – Luke Brooks, Australian rugby league player
- 1996 – Ben Chilwell, English footballer
- 1996 – Kaitlyn Dever, American actress
- 1997 – Madelyn Cline, American actress and model
- 1997 – Charlie McAvoy, American ice hockey player
- 2002 – Clara Tauson, Danish tennis player
- 2006 – Cooper Flagg, American basketball player

== Deaths ==
=== Pre-1600 ===
- AD 72 – Thomas the Apostle, Roman martyr and saint (born 1 AD)
- 882 – Hincmar, French archbishop and historian (born 806)
- 956 – Sun Sheng, Chinese chancellor
- 975 – Al-Mu'izz, Fatimid caliph (born 932)
- 1001 – Hugh of Tuscany, Italian margrave (born 950)
- 1215 – Ali ibn Muhammad ibn al-Walid, Dāʿī al-Muṭlaq of Tayyibi Isma'ilism (born c. 1128)
- 1308 – Henry I, Landgrave of Hesse (born 1244)
- 1338 – Thomas Hemenhale, bishop of Worcester
- 1362 – Constantine III, king of Armenia (born 1313)
- 1375 – Giovanni Boccaccio, Italian author and poet (born 1313)
- 1504 – Berthold von Henneberg, German archbishop (born 1442)
- 1536 – John Seymour, English courtier (born 1474)
- 1549 – Marguerite de Navarre, queen of Henry II of Navarre (born 1492)
- 1581 – Jean de la Cassière, 51st Grandmaster of the Knights Hospitaller (born 1502)
- 1597 – Peter Canisius, Dutch priest and saint (born 1521)

=== 1601–1900 ===
- 1608 – William Davison, secretary to Queen Elizabeth I of England (born c. 1541)
- 1610 – Catherine Vasa, Swedish princess (born 1539)
- 1646 – Sophie Axelsdatter Brahe, Danish noblewoman (born 1578)
- 1701 – Sir Hugh Paterson, Baronet of Bannockburn (born 1659)
- 1807 – John Newton, English soldier and minister (born 1725)
- 1824 – James Parkinson, English physician and paleontologist (born 1755)
- 1869 – Friedrich Ernst Scheller, German jurist and politician (born 1791)
- 1873 – Francis Garnier, French admiral and explorer (born 1839)
- 1889 – Friedrich August von Quenstedt, German geologist and palaeontologist (born 1809)

=== 1901–present ===
- 1920 – Mohammed Abdullah Hassan, leader of the Dervish movement (born 1856)
- 1929 – I. L. Patterson, American politician, 18th Governor of Oregon (born 1859)
- 1933 – Knud Rasmussen, Greenlandic anthropologist and explorer (born 1879)
- 1935 – Ted Birnie, English footballer and manager (born 1878)
- 1935 – Kurt Tucholsky, German-Swedish journalist and author (born 1890)
- 1937 – Violette Neatley Anderson, American judge (born 1882)
- 1937 – Ted Healy, American comedian and actor (born 1896)
- 1937 – Frank B. Kellogg, American lawyer and politician, 45th United States Secretary of State, Nobel Prize laureate (born 1856)
- 1940 – F. Scott Fitzgerald, American novelist and short story writer (born 1896)
- 1945 – George S. Patton, American general (born 1885)
- 1948 – Władysław Witwicki, Polish psychologist, philosopher, translator, historian (of philosophy and art) and artist (born 1878)
- 1952 – Kenneth Edwards, American golfer (born 1886)
- 1953 – Kaarlo Koskelo, Finnish-American wrestler and businessman (born 1888)
- 1957 – Eric Coates, English viola player and composer (born 1886)
- 1958 – H.B. Warner, English actor (born 1875)
- 1958 – Lion Feuchtwanger, German-American author and playwright (born 1884)
- 1959 – Rosanjin, Japanese calligrapher, engraver, and painter (born 1883)
- 1963 – Jack Hobbs, English cricketer and journalist (born 1882)
- 1964 – Carl Van Vechten, American author and photographer (born 1880)
- 1965 – Claude Champagne, Canadian violinist, pianist, and composer (born 1891)
- 1968 – Vittorio Pozzo, Italian footballer, coach, and manager (born 1886)
- 1971 – Ásta Sigurðardóttir, Icelandic writer and visual artist (born 1930)
- 1974 – Richard Long, American actor and director (born 1927)
- 1982 – Abu Al-Asar Hafeez Jullundhri, Pakistani poet and composer (born 1900)
- 1983 – Paul de Man, Belgian-born philosopher, literary critic and theorist (born 1919)
- 1988 – Nikolaas Tinbergen, Dutch-English ethologist and ornithologist, Nobel Prize laureate (born 1907)
- 1992 – Stella Adler, American actress and educator (born 1901)
- 1992 – Albert King, American singer-songwriter, guitarist, and producer (born 1924)
- 1992 – Nathan Milstein, Russian-American violinist and composer (born 1903)
- 1998 – Ernst-Günther Schenck, German colonel and physician (born 1904)
- 2004 – Autar Singh Paintal, Indian physiologist and neurologist (born 1925)
- 2006 – Saparmyrat Nyýazow, Turkmen engineer and politician, 1st President of Turkmenistan (born 1940) (date death announced)
- 2009 – Edwin G. Krebs, American biochemist and academic, Nobel Prize laureate (born 1918)
- 2009 – Christos Lambrakis, Greek journalist and businessman (born 1934)
- 2010 – Enzo Bearzot, Italian footballer and manager (born 1927)
- 2013 – Edgar Bronfman Sr., Canadian-American businessman and philanthropist (born 1929)
- 2013 – John Eisenhower, American historian, general, and diplomat, 45th United States Ambassador to Belgium (born 1922)
- 2014 – Udo Jürgens, Austrian-Swiss singer-songwriter and pianist (born 1934)
- 2014 – Sitor Situmorang, Indonesian poet and author (born 1923)
- 2014 – Billie Whitelaw, English actress (born 1932)
- 2017 – Bruce McCandless II, US astronaut who conducted the first untethered spacewalk (born 1937)
- 2019 – Andrew Clennel Palmer, British engineer (born 1938)
- 2024 – Michelle Botes, South African actress (born 1962)
- 2024 – Art Evans, American actor (born 1942)

== Holidays and observances ==
- Armed Forces Day (Philippines)
- Christian feast day:
  - O Oriens
  - Peter Canisius
  - Thomas the Apostle
  - December 21 (Eastern Orthodox liturgics)
- Forefathers' Day (Plymouth, Massachusetts)
- São Tomé Day (São Tomé and Príncipe)
