= 1361 =

1361 in various calendars
- Gregorian calendar: 1361; MCCCLXI
- Ab urbe condita: 2114
- Armenian calendar: 810; ԹՎ ՊԺ
- Assyrian calendar: 6111
- Balinese saka calendar: 1282–1283
- Bengali calendar: 767–768
- Berber calendar: 2311
- English Regnal year: 34 Edw. 3 – 35 Edw. 3
- Buddhist calendar: 1905
- Burmese calendar: 723
- Byzantine calendar: 6869–6870
- Chinese calendar: 庚子年 (Metal Rat); 4058 or 3851 — to — 辛丑年 (Metal Ox); 4059 or 3852
- Coptic calendar: 1077–1078
- Discordian calendar: 2527
- Ethiopian calendar: 1353–1354
- Hebrew calendar: 5121–5122
- Hindu calendars
- Vikram Samvat: 1417–1418
- Shaka Samvat: 1282–1283
- Kali Yuga: 4461–4462
- Holocene calendar: 11361
- Igbo calendar: 361–362
- Iranian calendar: 739–740
- Islamic calendar: 762–763
- Japanese calendar: Enbun 6 / Kōan 1 (康安元年)
- Javanese calendar: 1274–1275
- Julian calendar: 1361; MCCCLXI
- Korean calendar: 3694
- Minguo calendar: 551 before ROC 民前551年
- Nanakshahi calendar: −107
- Thai solar calendar: 1903–1904
- Tibetan calendar: ལྕགས་ཕོ་བྱི་བ་ལོ་ (male Iron-Rat); 1487 or 1106 or 334 — to — ལྕགས་མོ་གླང་ལོ་ (female Iron-Ox); 1488 or 1107 or 335

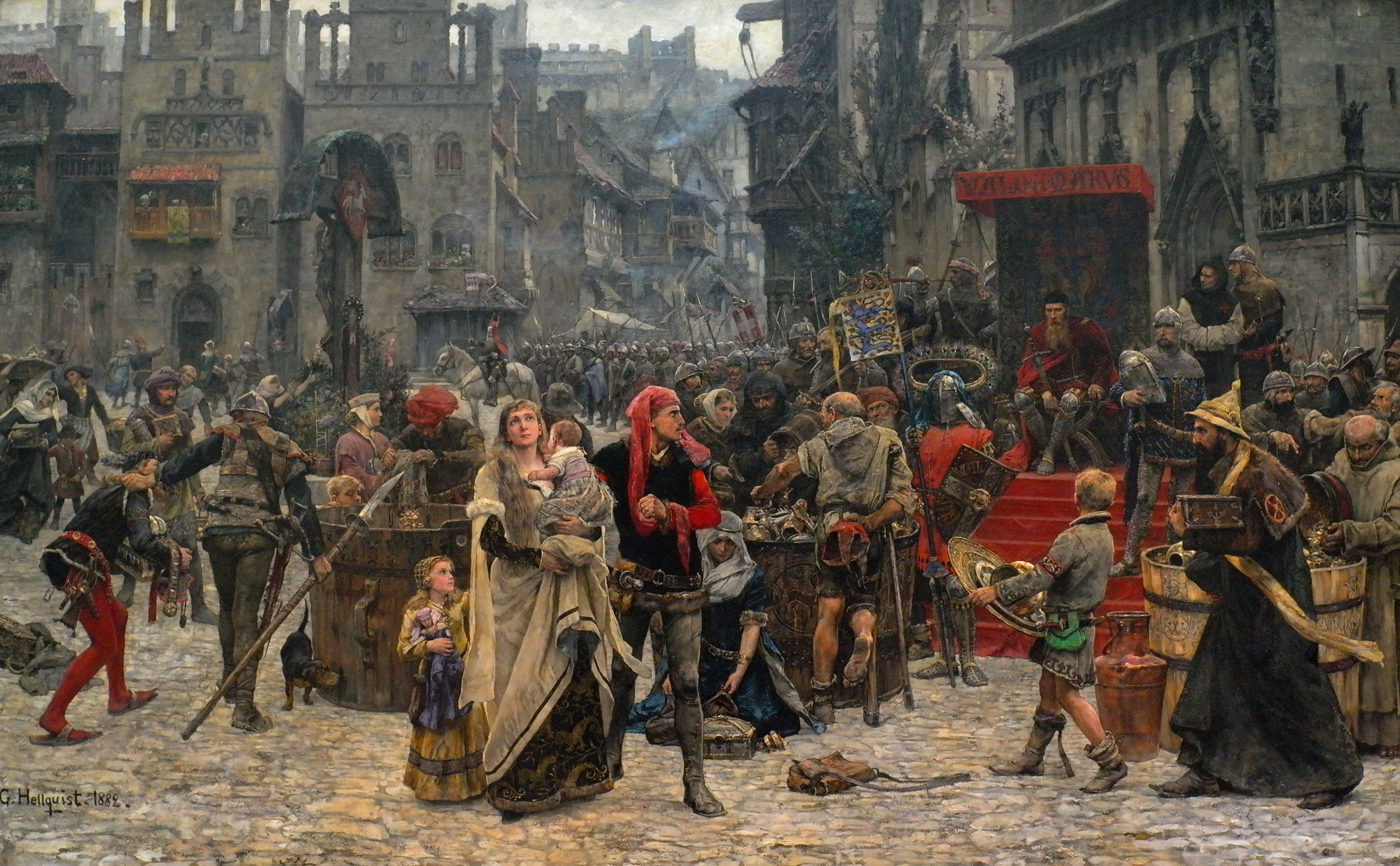
July 27: The Swedish city of Visby pays a ransom to Denmark's King Valdemar IV (1882 painting by Carl Gustaf Hellqvist)

Year 1361 (MCCCLXI) was a common year starting on Friday of the Julian calendar.

== Events ==
=== January–March ===
- January 24 – The English Parliament is opened at Westminster by King Edward III for a 25-day session.
- February 16 – In what is now Spain, the Muslim Sultan Muhammad VI of Granada concludes a six-year treaty of alliance with the Christian King Pedro IV of Aragon.
- February 18 – The English Parliament closes after a 25-day session. Among the acts passed and given royal assent are the Justices of the Peace Act 1361, defining, for the first time, the duties and powers of a justice of the peace and setting for the qualifications required. as well as acts governing weights and measres, the limitation of purveyances to "the King, the Queen and the King's eldest son", several acts for punishment of labourers and servants for "departing from their service into another county," and directing that if they "If a labourer or servant do flee to a city or borough, do flee to a city or borough, the chief officer upon request shall deliver him up."
- March 17 – An-Nasir Hasan, Mamluk Sultan of Egypt, is killed by one of his own mamluks, Yalbugha al-Umari, who, with the senior Mamluk emirs, has al-Mansur Muhammad installed as the new sultan.

=== April–June ===
- April 13 – The University of Pavia is founded, on the Italian Peninsula.
- May 1 – King Magnus Eriksson of Sweden and Norway sends a letter to the citizens of Visby, with a warning of an upcoming Danish invasion.
- May 18 – With the mediation of Cardinal Guy of Boulogne, the legate of Pope Innocent VI, the Peace of Terrer is agreed upon in Spain by representatives of King Pedro of Castile and King Pedro IV of Aragon to end the War of the Two Pedros between Castile and Aragon. Boulogne returns to Avignon on November 8, but the treaty he negotiated is not ratified by either kingdom.
- June 24 – Thirteen years after the Black Death disease came to England, a two-day spike in deaths occurs in London with 1,200 people dying from the bubonic plague on June 24 and June 25.
- June – Ahi Ayna, monarch of the Emirate of Erzincan in what is now eastern Turkey leads an expedition of conquest into the Kingdom of Georgia, capturing Akhaltsikhe, Samstskhe, and Atsquri, taking 12,000 people captive and collecting the jizya, a special tax on non-Muslims.

=== July–September ===
- July 27 – Battle of Visby: King Valdemar IV of Denmark conquers the city of Visby by defeating the defending Gutnish country yeomen, killing 1,200 of their number, and takes Gotland. To avert being sacked and looted, the leaders of Visby pay a large ransom to King Valdemar, which is collected in payments by sheriffs sent regularly to the city for tribute.
- August 3 – (24th day of 6th month of Shōhei 16) The Shōhei earthquake, estimated centuries later as being at least 8.4 magnitude, strikes off of the eastern coast of Japan and causes a tsunami which sweeps 1,700 houses and their thousands of inhabitants around Yukinominato Bay out to sea.
- August 6 – The Emir Ahi Ayna guides his army into the Empire of Trebizond and besieges the cities of Lazica, Golacha and Koukos.
- August 23 – King Peter I of Cyprus lands 10 ships at Antalya in what is now Turkey and, after a one-day siege, conquers the city
- September 22 – King Peter and his fleet arrive back in Cyprus after bringing back spoils of war and tributes from various regions of Asia Minor.

=== October–December ===
- October 10 – Edward the Black Prince marries Joan of Kent at Windsor Castle.
- October – A force of 200,000 soldiers of the Red Turbans of Yuan dynasty China, unable to retreat to China's Heibei region, cross the Yalu River and invade northern Korea, ruled by the kingdom of Goryeo. Led by Pan Cheng, Sha Liu, Guan Xiansheng, and Zhu Yuanshu, they capture Sakju and Iseong, and then assemble at Muju (now Yeongbyeon by early November.
- November 11 – China's Red Turbans break through the Korean defense line at Jeoryeong, and King Gongmin of Goryeo is forced to evacuate his capital at Gaegyeong (now Kaesong, North Korea) and to flee to Bokju (now Andong, North Gyeongsang Province, South Korea).
- November 21 – Philip of Rouvres, the 15-year old Duke of Burgundy, dies from the plague has no heirs, bringing an end to rule by the House of Capet and leaving the Duchy open to conquest by King Jean II of France.
- November 24 – China's Red Turbans, already occupying much of the Goryeo Kingdom (now North Korea), invade the capital city of Gaegyeong and burn down the royal palace.
- December 21 – The Battle of Linuesa is fought between invaders from the Emirate of Granada and defenders from the Kingdom of Castile at the city of Huesa in Castile's autonomous Kingdom of Jaén (now the Jaén Province of Spain). The Castilian Army, led by the Christian Diego García de Padilla, is able to defeat the Muslim troops of Granada. Most of the 600 Granadan troops are slaughtered before they can retreat.
- December 28 – King Jean II of France, nicknamed "John the Good" in English accounts, invades and takes control of the Duchy of Burgundy. He chooses to keep the Duchy as a separate state with himself as Duke, rather than to annex it to the Kingdom of France.

=== Date unknown ===
- Buda became the capital of the Kingdom of Hungary.
- In the Marinid Empire in modern-day Morocco, Abu Salim Ibrahim is overthrown by Abu Umar, who is in turn overthrown by Abu Zayyan.
- Great Troubles: the Blue Horde descends into anarchy. Between 1361 and 1378, over 20 khans succeed each other in different parts of the Blue Horde's territory.
- Ottoman Emirate conquered Didymoteicho
- Chinese rebels capture the Goryeo capital.
- The earliest known musical keyboard instrument is built, with the layout of black and white keys that becomes standard.

== Births ==
- February 26 – Wenceslaus, King of the Romans, King of Bohemia (d. 1419)
- date unknown
  - John Beaumont, 4th Baron Beaumont, Constable of Dover Castle (d. 1396)
  - Isabella, Countess of Foix, vassal ruler (d. 1428)
  - King Charles III of Navarre (d. 1425)
  - She Xiang, Chinese tribute chieftain (d. 1396)

== Deaths ==
- January 7 – Gerlach I of Nassau-Wiesbaden
- March 17 – An-Nasir Hasan, Mamluk Sultan of Egypt (b. 1334/35)
- March 23 – Henry of Grosmont, Duke of Lancaster, English soldier and diplomat
- May 21 – Orhan Ghazi, Ottoman Sultan (b. 1274)
- June 9 – Philippe de Vitry, French composer (b. 1291)
- June 15 – Johannes Tauler, German mystic theologian
- June 17 – Ingeborg of Norway, princess consort and regent of Sweden (b. 1301)
- September 18 – Louis V, Duke of Bavaria (b. 1315)
- October 4 – John de Mowbray, 3rd Baron Mowbray, English baron (b. 1310)
- October 8 – John Beauchamp, 3rd Baron Beauchamp, Warden of the Cinque Ports
- November 21 – Philip of Rouvres, Duke of Burgundy (plague) (b. 1346)
- date unknown
  - Giovanni, son of Francesco Petrarch (plague)
  - Richard Badew, Chancellor of the University of Cambridge
  - Reynold Cobham, 1st Baron Cobham of Sterborough, English knight and diplomat (b. 1295)
  - Hajji Beg, Barlas leader
  - c. 1362 Blanche of Bourbon
