= Enrique Enríquez =

Enrique Enríquez may refer to:

- Enrique Enríquez the Elder (c. 1246–before 28 February 1323), nobleman of Castile
- Enrique Enríquez the Younger (d. 1366), nobleman of Castile
- Enrico Enríquez (1701–1756), Italian Roman Catholic cardinal
- Enríquez de Valderrábano (c. 1500–after 1557), Spanish vihuelist and composer, sometimes called Enrique Enríquez de Valderrábano
