= Alexis Mendoza (artist) =

Cuban artist, writer and independent curator

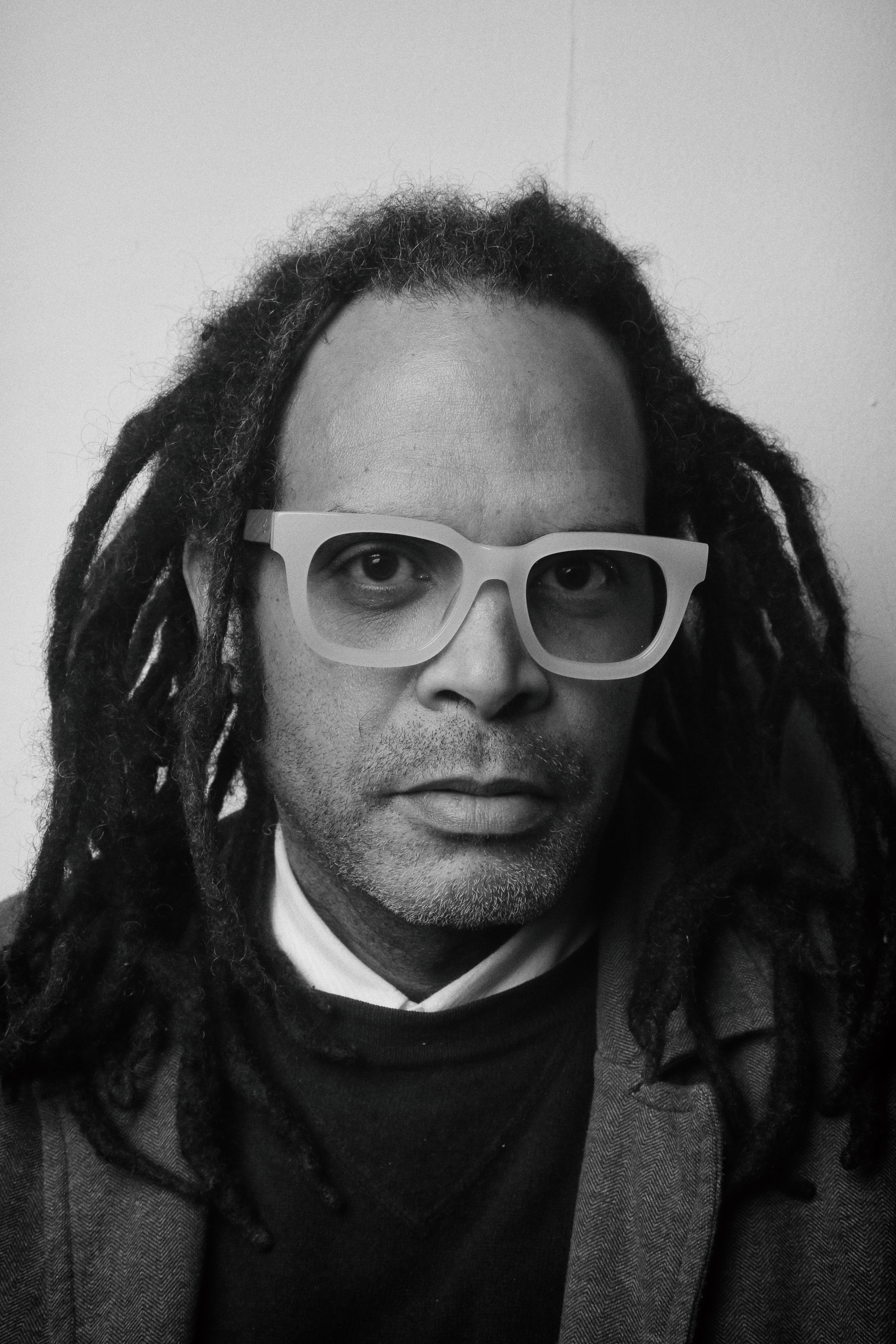
- Alexis Mendoza in 2021
- Born: Alexis Mendoza; 1972 (age 53–54); Havana, Cuba
- Education: Escuela Nacional de Bellas Artes San Alejandro; National Museum of Fine Arts of Havana
- Known for: New York Latin American Art Triennial
- Style: Contemporary
- Spouse(s): Clara Lopera-Sánchez "Tata" Actress at Tabula RaSa NYC Theater and Performance Lab.

Alexis Mendoza (born 1972) is a Cuban artist, writer and independent curator, based in New York City. His multidisciplinary work focuses on painting, sculpture, printmaking, drawing and installation. His art explores the transitioning and overlapping of colors as a metaphor for the Afro-Cuban customs, rituals and traditions.

== Early life and education ==
Mendoza was born in Havana City, Cuba. His past education includes the Escuela Nacional de Bellas Artes San Alejandro (1988), he graduated in Art History from Havana University (1994), and completed an Internship in Fine Art Conservation at the National Museum of Fine Arts of Havana (1992–93). He has lived and worked in New York City since 1995.

== Career ==
Mendoza has exhibited his artworks in museums and galleries in Argentina, Brazil, Chile, Costa Rica, Cuba, England, France, Germany, Mexico, Netherlands, Peru, Romania, Spain, Switzerland, and United States.

Mendoza's work has been written about in Cuban Art News, Sing For Hope, Artnet, JCAST, HFFNY and Manhattan Times.

He is a co-founder and co-creator of The Bronx Latin American Art Biennial which showcase the works of Latinx artists from New York and abroad.

In 2019 the art biennial evolved to the New York Latin American Art Triennial which explored issues such as migration, women's rights and social justice while celebrating Hispanic heritage.

In December 2020 he curated and participated in an outdoor art show in Upper Manhattan titled "For the Love of Art: An Appropriated Intentions Exhibition". The works of 20 artists were hanged on a vacant fence after reusing advertising banners as canvas. Participating artists included: Nelson Álvarez, Diego Anaya, Ed Andrade, Pablo Caviedes, Franck de las Mercedes, Wildriana del Jesús Paulino, Darwin Erazo, Alex “Fdez” Fernández, Julia Justo, Carlos Jesús Martínez Domínguez-FEEGZ, Ricardo Llano, Rafaela Luna, Paola Martínez, Alexis Mendoza, Yani Monzón, Naivy Pérez, Yumarlis Rodríguez, Moses Ros, Luis Stephenberg and José Luis Tejeda.

In 2021 Mendoza co-curated with Anderson M. Pilgrim the exhibition "Social Reckoning" at the Abrazo Interno Gallery and Teatro Latea both located at the Clemente Soto Velez Cultural and Educational Center. The show was organized in collaboration with NYU and Univision and commemorated Martin Luther King Jr and his influence on the cultural heritage of the Americas and the world. Participating artists included: Carla Armour, Diogenes Ballester, Tanda Francis, Michael Kelly Williams, Ademola Olugebefola, TAFA, Nelson Álvarez, Ed Andrade, Diego Anaya, Pablo Caviedes, Wildriana de Jesús Paulino, Franck de las Mercedes, Darwin Erazo, Alex “Fdez” Fernández, Julia Justo, Rafaela Luna, Yani Monzón, Naivy Pérez, Moses Ros, and José Luis Tejeda.

He is the founding member of BxArts Factory and is part of the BX200, a curated selection of artists identified with The Bronx.

Mendoza is also the author of the books Latin America, The Culture and the New Men; Objective Reference of Painting: The Work of Ismael Checo, 1986-2006; and Reflections: The Sensationalism of the Art from Cuba, all three published by Wasteland Press. He also authored "Rigo Peralta: Revelaciones de un Universo Mistico", published by Argos Publications, Dominican Republic.
