= Enrique Enríquez the Elder =

- Coat of arms of the Infante of Castile, Henry the Senator
- Born: c. 1246
- Died: Before 28 February 1323
- Occupation: Nobleman

Enrique Enríquez the Elder (c. 1246 – before 28 February 1323) was a nobleman of Castile, natural son of the Infante Henry of Castile. He was Lord of La Puebla de los Infantes. His son, Enrique Enríquez the Younger, had a distinguished career serving kings Alfonso XI of Castile and Peter of Castile.

Enrique Enríquez was the natural son of the Infante Henry of Castile and Lady Mayor Rodriguez Pecha. His father was son of King Ferdinand III of Castile by his first wife Beatrice of Swabia. His mother was the daughter of Esteban Pérez Pecha, Lord of San Román de Hornija and governor of Zamora, and Mayor Rodriguez de Balboa. Mayor Rodriguez de Balboa was daughter of Pedro Rodríguez de Balboa, chamberlain of the Infante Henry of Castile.

The exact date of birth of Enrique Enríquez is not known. Some authors say he was born in Andalusia around 1246. Others think he was born in Italy during one of the periods when the Infante Henry was staying there. There is some doubt about his paternity, since the Infante Henry did not name him or his mother in his will, despite naming many of his servants. On 27 July 1253 his uncle, Alfonso X of Castile the Wise, gave Enrique Enríquez the lordship of La Puebla de los Infantes, in the present province of Seville.

Enrique Enríquez married Estefanía Rodríguez de Ceballos, Lady of Villalba de los Barros and of Vado de las Estacas. She was daughter of Rodrigo González de Ceballos, Alcalde Mayor of Toledo and Adelantado Mayor of Murcia, and María Fernández de Caviedes, Lady of Caviedes, Lamadrid and La Revilla. One son was born of the marriage, Enrique Enríquez the Younger. In 1307 his wife ceded the lordship of Villalba de los Barros to Enrique Enríquez the Younger, with the consent of Enrique Enríquez. The grant was confirmed by a document issued in the city of Valladolid on 12 April 1320 by King Alfonso XI of Castile.

The date when Enrique Enríquez died is unknown, but must have occurred before 28 February 1323. On that date his wife described herself as a widow in a document issued in the city of Seville, when she sold a house. Enrique Enríquez the Younger inherited his parents' possessions and served kings Alfonso XI of Castile and Peter of Castile, who awarded him several grants. Several descendants of Enrique Enríquez, including his son, were buried in the monastery of San Francisco in Seville. The monastery was looted, desecrated and burned by French troops during the Spanish War of Independence and later demolished in the year 1841.
