= New York Latin American Art Triennial =

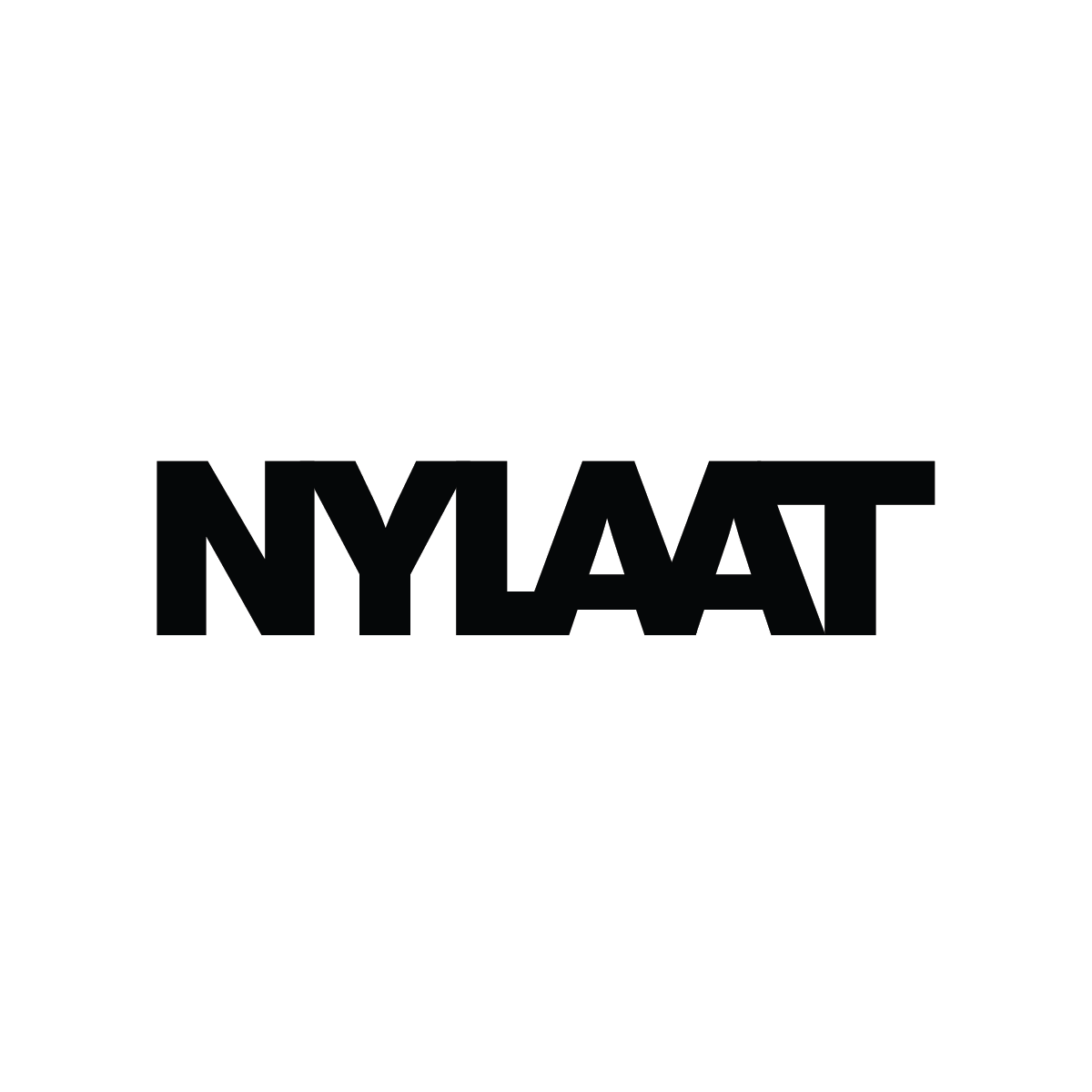
- Official Logo
- Established: 2008; 18 years ago
- Location: New York, NY
- Type: Art, Cultural
- Executive director: Alexis Mendoza
- Director: Naivy Pérez
- Curator: Ezequiel Taveras
- Website: www.nylaat.org

The New York Latin American Art Triennial (formerly Bronx Latin American Art Biennial) is an event that takes place every three years. It is dedicated to presenting contemporary Latin American art in New York City.

== History ==
The New York Latin American Art Triennial (NYLAAT) was stablished by the Bronx Hispanic Festival (BHF) in 2008, under the name Bronx Latin American Art Biennial. It was co-founded by artists/curators Luis Stephenberg and Alexis Mendoza. In 2019, the event moved to a triennial format and took its current name, New York Latin American Art Triennial.

For the 2016 edition Chief Curator Alexis Mendoza and Triennial Director Luis Stephenberg invited Associate Curators Ismael Checo, Miguel Lescano, Yarisa Colón and Josue Guarionex Colón to be part of the curatorial committee.

Continuing to build on this momentum, the 2022 edition saw further expansion of the curatorial team with the addition of associate curators and artists Ezequiel Taveras, Naivy Perez, Franck de las Mercedes, Alex Fdez Fernandez, Julia Justo and Lidia Hernandez. Their collective efforts were instrumental in supporting the innovative curatorial vision of Mendoza and Stephenberg, further enhancing the Triennial's diverse and dynamic programming.

The broad range of Triennial artists have included representation from Argentina, Bolivia, Chile, Colombia, Costa Rica, Cuba, Dominican Republic, Ecuador, El Salvador, Guatemala, Honduras, Mexico, Nicaragua, Panama, Paraguay, Peru, Puerto Rico, Spain, Uruguay and Venezuela.

The New York Latin American Art Triennial is based in New York City, and it frequently partnered with galleries, museums and local arts and educational organizations to present contemporary art within the city's cultural context, featuring works that range from photography to art installations, from performance art to sculpture

Partner institutions have included: the Bronx Museum of the Arts, the Bronx Music Heritage Center, Hebrew Home Riverdale, Taller Boricua, Lehman College, Boricua College Art Gallery, BronxArtSpace, Longwood Art Gallery at Hostos Community College, Andrew Freedman Home, Poe Park Visitors Center Gallery, Clemente Soto Velez Cultural Center, Loisaida Center and Rio Gallery.

NYLAAT has showcased the work of hundreds of artists whose works have touch on themes important to the community such as migration, women's rights and other issues of social justice.

== Recent developments ==
The 2022 triennial is titled "Abya Yala: Structural Origins”: Pre-Columbian, African, European influence and the compulsive change of the contemporary era.
