= Fernán Sánchez de Badajoz =

Fernán Sánchez de Badajoz was a member of the prominent Sánchez de Badajoz family. In 1369, he took over multitudes of property in Barcarrota, near Badajoz, granted by Enrique II. He had a son, Garci.
