= Pedro Ponce de León the Elder =

- Died: 1352
- Occupation: Nobleman

Pedro Ponce de León the Elder (died 1352) was a Castilian nobleman, great-grandson of King Alfonso IX of León. He was a knight of the Order of the Band, and Lord of Marchena, Bailén, Rota, Mairena del Alcor, Bornos and Oliva de la Frontera.

== Family origins ==
Pedro Ponce de León was the son of Fernando Ponce de León y Meneses, Lord of Marchena, and Isabel Pérez de Guzmán, Lady of Chipiona and Rota. His father's parents were Fernán Pérez Ponce de León I, Adelantado mayor of the Andalucía frontier and lord of the Puebla de Asturias, and his wife, Urraca Gutiérrez de Meneses. His mother was daughter of Alonso Pérez de Guzmán, famous for defending the city of Tarifa and first lord of Sanlúcar de Barrameda, and his wife, María Alfonso Coronel. He was the brother of Fernando Pérez Ponce de León, Master of the Order of Alcántara between 1346 and 1355.

He was the paternal grandson of King Alfonso IX of León.

== Life ==
The birth date of Pedro Ponce de León is unknown. His father, Fernando Ponce de León y Meneses, fell out with the king of Castile and León as a youth and moved to Aragon, where King Peter III of Aragon gave him various properties. He later returned to Castile and was given the town of Marchena in 1309 by King Ferdinand IV of Castile. King Alfonso XI of Castile the Just (1311-1350) confirmed many of Pedro Ponce de León's privileges as a Castilian nobleman. On 6 April 1331 Alfonso XI was in the city of Seville. There he confirmed Pedro as Lord of Marchena, which had belonged to his father, for good services to the king at the Battle of Teba (1330). During the king's coronation he was made a knight of the Order of the Band, instituted by Alfonso XI.

In 1336 the Castilian-Leonese troops, among which were those of Pedro Ponce de León, together with those of Juan Alonso Pérez de Guzmán y Coronel, second lord of Sanlúcar de Barrameda, and commanded by Enrique Enríquez the Younger, lord of Villalba de los Barros, defeated the troops of King Afonso IV of Portugal in the Battle of Villanueva de Barcarrota. This victory forced the king of Portugal to lift the siege of Badajoz. On 23 November 1337 the King was again in the city of Seville where he gave Pedro Ponce de León the Extremaduran village of Oliva de la Frontera, then called Granja de la Oliva.

Later, he accompanied King Alfonso XI in almost all the military expeditions he undertook, such as the lifting of the siege of Tarifa, and the Battle of Río Salado, fought in 1340, in which the troops of the Kingdom of Castile defeated the Muslims. On 20 November 1342 Alfonso XI gave Pedro Ponce de León the lordship of Mairena del Alcor, segregating the municipality from the jurisdiction of Carmona, for services rendered by Pedro Ponce de León during the Siege of Algeciras (1342–1344). The king documented the gift of Mairena del Alcor on 17 August 1345 in the city of Tordesillas.

On 8 August 1349 the king was in Seville where he confirmed the possession of Pedro Ponce de León in the town of Rota, for the numerous services rendered to the Crown. The same year, Pedro Ponce de León was present with the king at the fifth siege of Gibraltar, which began in 1349 and lasted until 1350. At the siege of Gibraltar, Alfonso XI sold him the town of Bailén for one hundred and fifty thousand maravedis, recorded in a document drawn up on 26 December 1349.

On 26 March 1350 King Alfonso XI the Just died of the plague. He was succeeded on the throne of Castile and León by his son, Peter of Castile the Cruel. Pedro Ponce de Leon went to the city of Algeciras, of which he was governor, after the death of Alfonso XI. When Peter the Cruel named Gutierre Fernández de Toledo governor of Algeciras, Pedro Ponce de León left that city and went to Marchena. He soon returned to the service of the king, whom he continued to serve until his death. Pedro Ponce de Leon died in 1352.

== Burial ==
After his death, the corpse of Pedro Ponce de León was buried in the Monastery of San Agustín of Seville. Now missing, his remains were deposited in a tomb located in the chapel of the monastery church. The tomb containing his remains had the following epitaph:

HERE LIES DON PEDRO DE LEON, LORD OF MARCHENA, THE OLD, SON OF DON FERNAN PEREZ PONCE DE LEON AND DONA IFABEL DE GUZMAN, DAUGHTER OF DON ALONFO PEREZ DE GUZMAN, AND OF DONA MARIA ALONFO COLONEL, WHOM GOD FORGIVE.

During the War of Independence, in 1810 the Monastery of San Agustin was looted and the tombs of Pedro Ponce de Leon and his family were desecrated and destroyed. After the monastery of St. Augustine was sold off in the nineteenth century, the remains of Ponce de León family members who were buried there were moved to the church of the Annunciation of Seville, where they remain today, deposited in the Pantheon of Illustrious Sevillians in the crypt of the Church of the Annunciation.

== Wife and children ==
Pedro Ponce de León married Beatriz de Jérica after January 1335. She was daughter of Jaime de Jérica, Baron of Jérica, and Beatriz de Lauria, great-granddaughter of James I of Aragon, King of Aragon. Several children were born of the marriage:

- Juan Ponce de León y Jérica (died 1367). Lord of Marchena. He was executed in the city of Seville in 1367 by order of Peter I of Castile. He was buried in the chapel of the Mejias in the monastery of San Francisco de Sevilla, since disappeared.
- Pedro Ponce de León y Jérica (died 1387). He inherited the manor of Marchena after the death of his brother Juan Ponce de León, and married Sancha de Haro, Lady of Bailén, inherited from her parents Juan Ruiz de Baeza Lord of La Guardia de Jaén and Bailen and of Teresa de Haro. He is the 2nd great-grandfather of conquistador Juan Ponce de León discoverer of Florida. His remains now rest in the Church of the Annunciation of Seville, in the interior of the Pantheon of Illustrious people of Sevilla.
- Alfonso Ponce de León (died after 1387). Knight of the Order of Santiago and Knight Commander León. He died childless and was buried in the disappeared monastery of San Francisco of Seville.
- Gutierrez Ponce de Leon. He died childless.
- Fernando Ponce de Leon. Died in childhood.
- Jaime Ponce de Leon. Died in childhood.
- María Ponce de León. She was betrothed to Fernando Alfonso de Castilla y Guzmán, lord of Ledesma and illegitimate son of Alfonso XI of Castile, and later married Alvar Pérez de Castro, Count of Arraiolos and son of Pedro Fernández de Castro the Warrior, Lord of the House of Castro.
- Beatriz Ponce de León y Jérica. She was the lover of King Henry II of Castile. The affair resulted in two sons, Fadrique de Castilla y Ponce de León, first Duke of Benavente, and Beatriz de Castilla y Ponce de León, who married Juan Alonso Pérez de Guzmán y Osorio, fourth lord of Sanlúcar de Barrameda and First Count of Niebla.
