= Battle of Linuesa =

1361 battle of the Reconquista

- Part of the Reconquista
- Map of the Nasrid Emirate of Granada.
Date	21 December 1361
Location	Huesa, Kingdom of Jaén, Spain
Result	Victory for the Kingdom of Castile.

Belligerents
Kingdom of Castile: Kingdom of Jaén; Order of Calatrava	Emirate of Granada

Commanders and leaders
Diego García de Padilla; Enrique Enríquez el Mozo; Men Rodríguez de Biedma	Muhammed VI

The Battle of Linuesa was an action fought on 21 December 1361 in the city of Huesa, Kingdom of Jaén (present-day Province of Jaén, Spain). The battle was fought between the Kingdom of Castile and the forces of the Emirate of Granada. The battle resulted in a victory for the forces of the Kingdom of Castile.

The Castilian forces were commanded by Diego García de Padilla, the Grand Master of the Order of Calatrava, Enrique Enríquez "el Mozo", the Adelantado Mayor of the frontera de Andalucía, and by Men Rodríguez de Biedma, the head Caudillo of the Bishop of Jaén.

== Context ==
The Muslim troops of the Emirate of Granada, invaded Jaén towards the end of 1361, pillaging the areas of the Adelantamiento de Cazorla and setting fire to the municipality of Peal de Becerro. The Muslim forces were composed of around 600 cavalry and 2 thousand foot soldiers. They had also captured many captives, both male and female and had amassed a large amount of loot.

== The battle ==
When Diego García de Padilla, Grand Master of Calatrava heard news about the Muslim invasion of Cazorla, and of the havoc being raised in Peal de Becerro, he gathered his forces and gave pursuit.

The Castilian-Leonese troops gained control over a river crossing at Guadiana Menor with the intent of taking advantage of the fact that the Muslim forces would have to cross the river at the crossing to return to their lands. The battle commenced on 21 December 1361.

The Muslim troops arrived at the pass previously occupied by the Christian forces and immediately attempted to dislodge their position to force a crossing. The Castilian-Leonese forces advanced on the Muslim troops in return and routed them completely at a place called Linuesa. The chronicles of the King Peter I of Castile recount that few Muslims escaped from the action with their lives and that they were slaughtered almost to a man.

== Aftermath ==
When King Peter I of Castile heard news that his armies had routed the invaders, he was extremely pleased, but ultimately ordered that his captains turn over all their plunder to the crown and promised to give them each three hundred Maravedies in return.

Further, once in power of the treasure handed over, the king failed to make good on the promised reward money. The breaking of this promise doubtless angered Diego García de Padilla, Enrique Enríquez "el Mozo", and Men Rodríguez de Biedma who had fought the battle in the king's name. Peter I of Castile is known to history as "Pedro I el Cruel" or "Peter I the Cruel".

A few months later, the same Castilian army led by the same commanders was defeated by Muslim troops at the Battle of Guadix which was fought in winter of the year 1362.

== See also ==
- Peter I of Castile
- Enrique Enríquez "el Mozo"
