= Battle of Villanueva de Barcarrota =

- Part of Luso–Castilian War
- Kingdoms of the Iberian peninsula in the 14th century
Date	1336
Location	Villanueva de Barcarrota, Badajoz province, Spain 38.517415°N 6.850933°W
Result	Castilian victory

Belligerents
Kingdom of Castile	Kingdom of Portugal

Commanders and leaders
Enrique Enríquez the Younger; Juan Alonso Pérez de Guzmán y Coronel; Pedro Ponce de León the Elder	Pedro Afonso de Sousa
- Location of Barcarrota in Spain

The Battle of Villanueva de Barcarrota was fought in 1336 near the town of Villanueva de Barcarrota in Extremadura between troops of the Kingdom of Portugal led by Pedro Afonso de Sousa, and troops of the Kingdom of Castile led by Enrique Enriquez the Younger, who led the forces of the Bishop of Jaén, assisted by Juan Alonso Pérez de Guzmán y Coronel and Pedro Ponce de León the Elder, who led forces sent by the city of Seville. The Portuguese were defeated. As a result, Afonso IV of Portugal, who was besieging the city of Badajoz, ordered the siege to be lifted and returned with his troops to Portugal.

The Battle of Villanueva de Barcarrota took place during the 1336 war in which King Afonso IV of Portugal and his Castilian allies, Juan Manuel, Prince of Villena, and Juan Núñez III de Lara, opposed King Alfonso XI of Castile.

== Background ==
In 1335 a dispute arose between Juan Manuel of Villena and Alfonso XI, King of Castile, in which Juan Núñez III de Lara, lord of Lara and Vizcaya was involved. Some years earlier a marriage had been arranged between Constanza Manuel, daughter of Juan Manuel of Villena, and Prince Pedro of Portugal, son of Afonso IV of Portugal. However, the union was opposed by the kings of Castile and Aragon, as they considered Prince Peter of Portugal was still betrothed to Blanche of Castile, daughter of the late Peter of Castile, Lord of Cameros (1290-1319) and Maria of Aragon. Due to a malady of Blanche of Castile, neither Afonso IV of Portugal nor his son Pedro wanted to be held to that marriage.

King Afonso IV of Portugal made an alliance with Don Juan Manuel, Pedro Fernández de Castro, Juan Núñez III de Lara and Juan Alfonso de Alburquerque to bring Juan Manuel's daughter to Portugal. They pledged to make war on King Alfonso XI of Castile if he did not break his relationship with Eleanor de Guzmán, as this offended his lawful wife, Maria of Portugal, if he did not reinstate to María Díaz de Haro (wife of Juan Núñez III de Lara) the possessions that had belonged to her father and grandparents, or if he attacked any of their lands.

In June 1336 King Alfonso XI of Castile and Léon besieged Juan Núñez III de Lara in the town of Lerma, Burgos, while his other armies besieged Torrelobatón, Busto and Villafranca Montes de Oca. Alfonso XI also ordered the Masters of the Orders of Santiago and Calatrava to take their troops to Peñafiel Castle, where Juan Manuel of Villena was based, to prevent him from helping Juan Núñez III de Lara. Pedro Fernández de Castro, who had promised King Alfonso XI to help in the fight against Juan Manuel, went with his troops to Peñafiel and challenged Juan Manuel to fight. Juan Manuel refused to leave the safety of the citadel. Given this, Pedro Fernandez de Castro joined Alfonso XI in his siege of Lerma.

The town of Torrelobatón soon capitulated to the king's troops on condition that the king would not return it to Juan Núñez III de Lara, who had denied his vassalage to the king during the siege of the town of Lerma. Pedro Fernandez de Castro and Juan Alfonso de Haro with troops under his command then went to assist in the siege of Lerma. Afonso IV of Portugal threatened Alfonso XI of Castile and León with war if he did not lift the siege of Lerma. Juan Manuel of Villena asked king Peter IV of Aragon to help the besieged in Lerma. He did not ask Peter IV to become involved in the conflict, but wrote him a letter in which he recounted all the wrongs done by Alfonso XI of Castile and León to him and his family.

== Siege of Badajoz ==
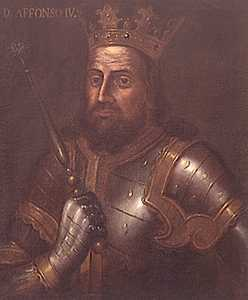
Afonso IV of Portugal

When Afonso IV of Portugal learned that Alfonso XI of Castile refused to lift the siege of Lerma, his troops invaded Castile and laid siege to the city of Badajoz, hoping this would force Alfonso XI to lift the siege of Lerma. However, Alfonso XI continued besieging Lerma and sent messengers to Pedro Ponce de León the Elder, Alvar Pérez de Guzmán the Elder and Enrique Enríquez the Younger, noblemen of Castile, asking them to send troops to join Pedro Fernández de Castro "the Warrior", whom he had ordered to go to the aid of Badajoz.

Alfonso XI also asked for help from the councils of the cities of Córdoba, Seville, Trujillo, Plasencia, Coria and Cáceres, and from Ruy Pérez Maldonado, Master of the Order of Alcántara. These united their forces with those of Pedro Fernández de Castro, and promptly left for Badajoz to aid the besieged town. According to the Chronicle of Alfonso XI, the indiscipline of the troops of Pedro Fernández de Castro was remarkable and his men caused serious damage in the places through which they passed on the way to the city of Badajoz.

When other noblemen and councils were informed that the city of Badajoz was being besieged by the Portuguese, they readied their troops and prepared to help, even though they had not yet received the messages sent by the King Alfonso XI of Castile. Enrique Enríquez the Younger, lord of Villalba de los Barros and great-grandson of King Ferdinand III of Castile, left the city of Seville accompanied by the men of the Bishopric of Jaén, and went to the Extremadura town of Barcarrota Villanueva, 49 kilometres (30 mi) from Badajoz. He began to harass the Portuguese, preventing them from obtaining supplies. He made inroads into the kingdom of Portugal where he seized much property, livestock and captives.

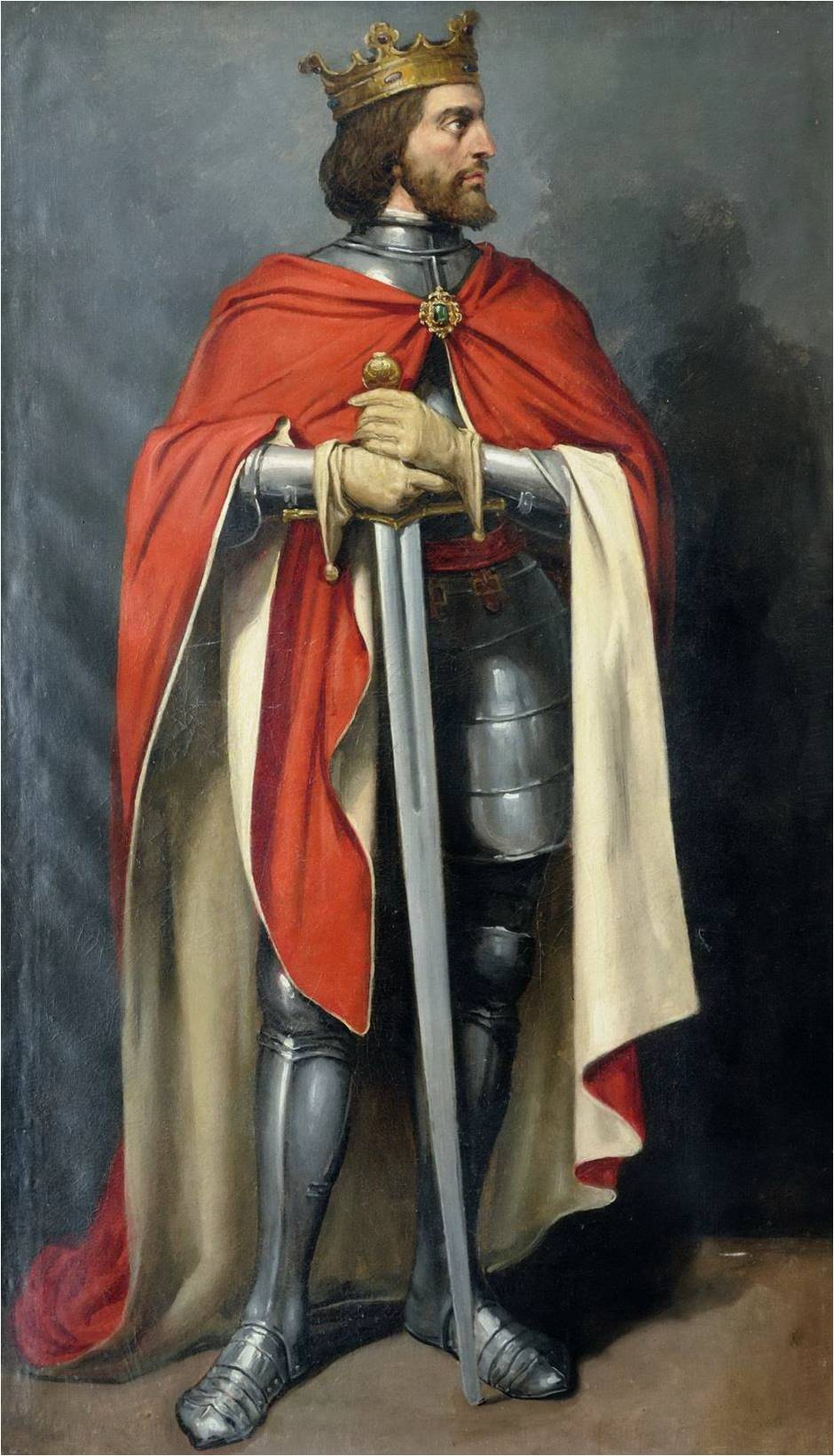
Alfonso XI, King of Castile

When Afonso IV of Portugal, who was still besieging Badajoz, learned of the raids that Enrique Enríquez the Younger had made into Portugal, he commanded Pedro Afonso de Sousa, a nobleman of his kingdom, to go to Villanueva de Barcarrota and apprehend the Castilian-Leonese under Enrique Enríquez, and to destroy and burn the town. When the Portuguese troops came in sight of Barcarrota, Enrique Enríquez the Younger and his men sortied from the town, despite being outnumbered. They did not have the opportunity, as the Portuguese made camp on a nearby hill and from there began to make minor attacks against the Spaniards, who, because of their numerical inferiority, did not dare to engage with the Portuguese.

While the Portuguese and Spaniards remained at a stalemate, the forces of Seville commanded by Juan Alonso Pérez de Guzmán, lord of Sanlúcar de Barrameda, and Pedro Ponce de León the Elder, Lord of Marchena and Bailén, reached the vicinity of Villanueva de Barcarrota. They did not know of the presence of Portuguese troops and were not ready for combat. An individual who had climbed the tower of the church of Villanueva de Barcarrota observed their arrival, realized by the banners they were carrying that they were Castilian-Leonese, and communicated this to Enrique Enríquez the Younger and his men. He told them that if they hurried to attack the troops of Pedro Afonso de Sousa, they could defeat them.

Combat-ready troops under the command of Juan Alonso Perez de Guzman and Pedro Ponce de León the Elder were sent to deal with the Portuguese troops, who promptly fled. The troops of Enrique Enríquez the Younger, who were near the Portuguese, joined the chase before the troops of Juan Alonso Pérez de Guzmán had entered combat. The Portuguese army began to be slaughtered. The Chronicle of Alfonso XI says they were pursued for more than 10 kilometres (6.2 mi). Almost all the Portuguese infantry were killed, and many knights also died. At nightfall the Castilian-Leonese troops returned to Barcarrota. There they learned that troops sent by the council of Cordoba were on the way to Barcarrota.

== Aftermath ==
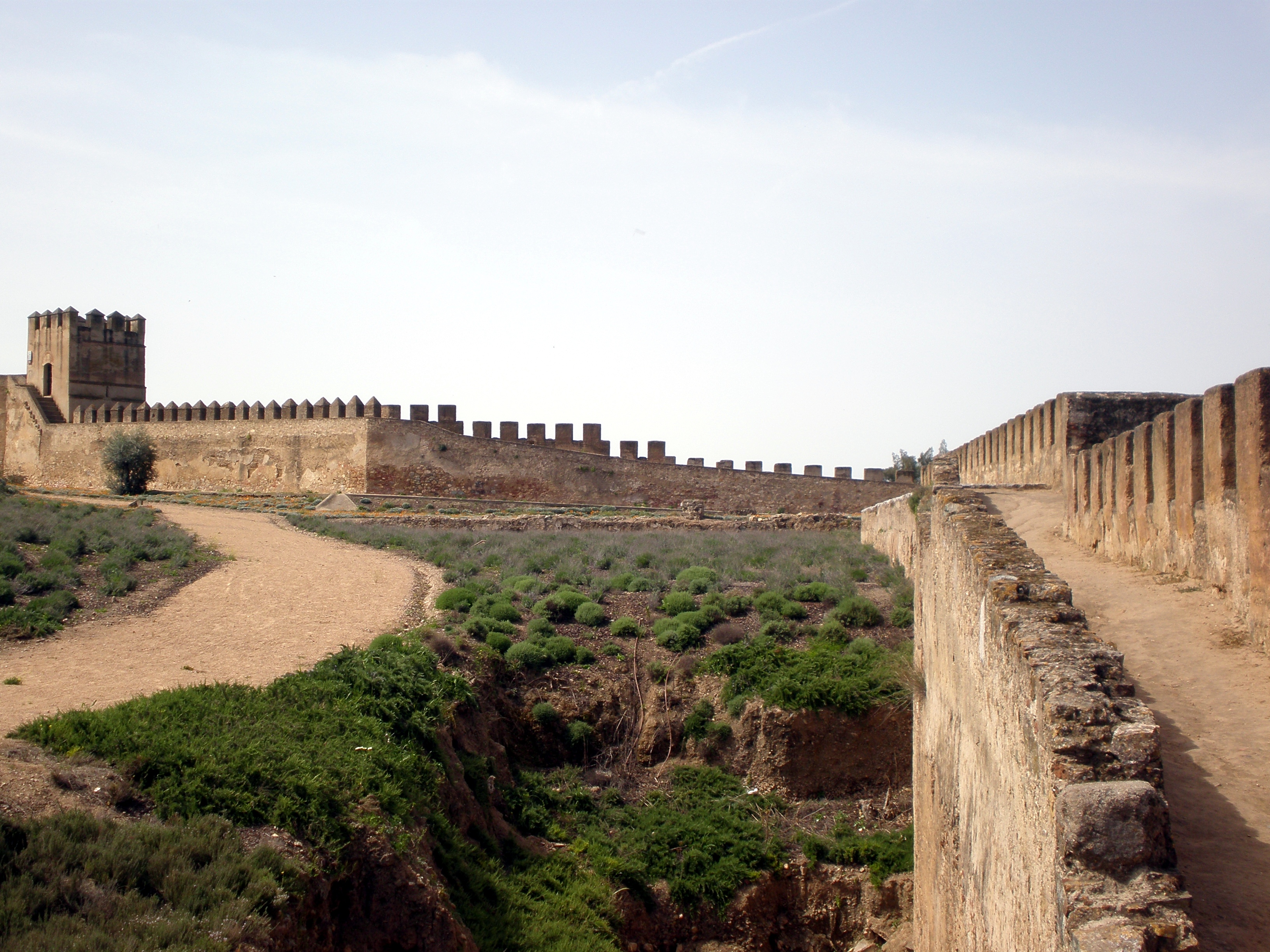
Alcazaba de Badajoz

When Afonso IV of Portugal, who was still besieging the city of Badajoz, was informed of the defeat of the Portuguese troops in Barcarrota he was disheartened, because the defeat added to the difficulties of conquering the city of Badajoz.

Badajoz was well fortified and well defended by war-hardened men unlike the Portuguese knights, who were not accustomed to fighting. Moreover, the king of Portugal received messengers that told him that Pedro Fernández de Castro "the Warrior" was approaching with his troops to succor Badajoz and that the forces of the council of the city of Córdoba were approaching Badajoz, while the victorious troops of Enrique Enriquez the Younger, Juan Alonso Pérez de Guzmán and Pedro Ponce de León the Elder remained in Barcarrota.

Given the number of enemy troops approaching him, Afonso IV of Portugal decided to lift the siege of Badajoz and return with his army to Portugal.

During his return journey, Afonso IV of Portugal attacked the lands of the Order of Alcántara, since they had opposed him. They defended their territories, but Ruy Pérez Maldonado, Master of the Order, was criticized for his lack of courage against the Portuguese troops.
