= Scheller =

Scheller is a German surname. Notable people with the surname include:

- Ana Sophia Scheller (born 1986), American ballet dancer
- David Scheller (born 1971), German actor
- Ernst Scheller (1899–1942), German politician
- Friedrich Ernst Scheller (1791–1869), German jurist and politician
- Heini Scheller (1929–1957), Swiss rower
- Rob Scheller (born 1927), Dutch art historian
- Stuart Scheller (born 1981), American Marine Corps lieutenant colonel
- Tjark Scheller (born 2002), German footballer
