= Caviedes =

Caviedes is a surname. Notable people with the surname include:

- Ángel Zaldívar Caviedes (born 1994), Mexican footballer
- José Antonio González Caviedes (1938–1996), Spanish politician
- Juan del Valle y Caviedes (1645–1698), often referenced as Caviedes, Colonial poet from Viceregal Peru
- Leónidas Plaza y Gutiérrez y Caviedes (1865–1933), Ecuadorian politician
- Miguel Caviedes (1930–2025), Chilean Roman Catholic prelate
- Pablo Caviedes (born 1971), Ecuadorean, US-based multidisciplinary artist
