= La Parra =

- municipality
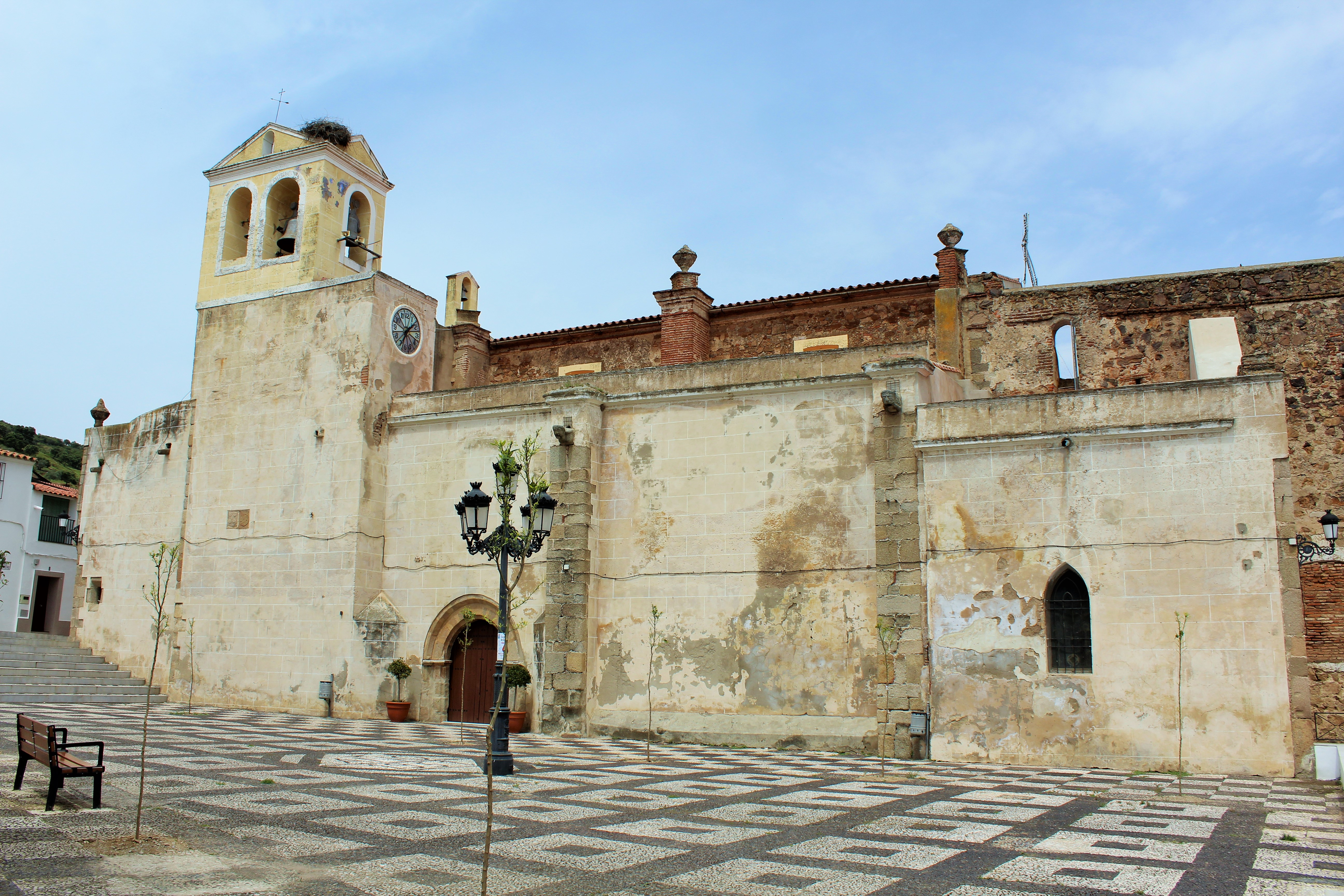
- Parish church

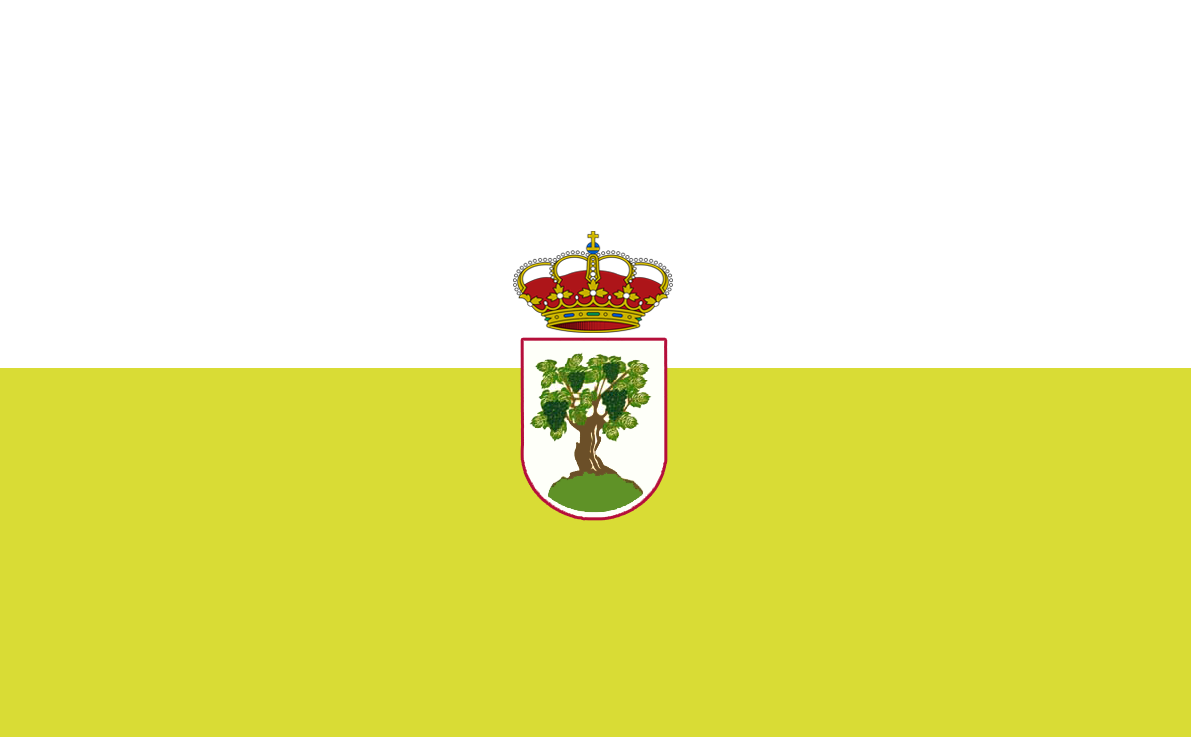
- Flag Coat of arms
- Interactive map of La Parra
- Coordinates: 38°31′17″N 6°37′24″W
- Country: Spain
- Autonomous community: Extremadura
- Province: Badajoz

Area
  - Total: 78 km^{2} (30 sq mi)
- Elevation: 525 m (1,722 ft)

Population (2025-01-01)
  - Total: 1,297
  - Density: 17/km^{2} (43/sq mi)
- Time zone: UTC+1 (CET)
  - Summer (DST): UTC+2 (CEST)
- Website: www.laparra.es
- No Official web www.laparra.com.es

La Parra is a municipality located in the province of Badajoz, Extremadura, Spain. According to the 2005 census (INE), the municipality has a population of 1425 inhabitants.

== See also ==
- List of municipalities in Badajoz
