= Pablo Caviedes =

Ecuadorean artist (born 1971)

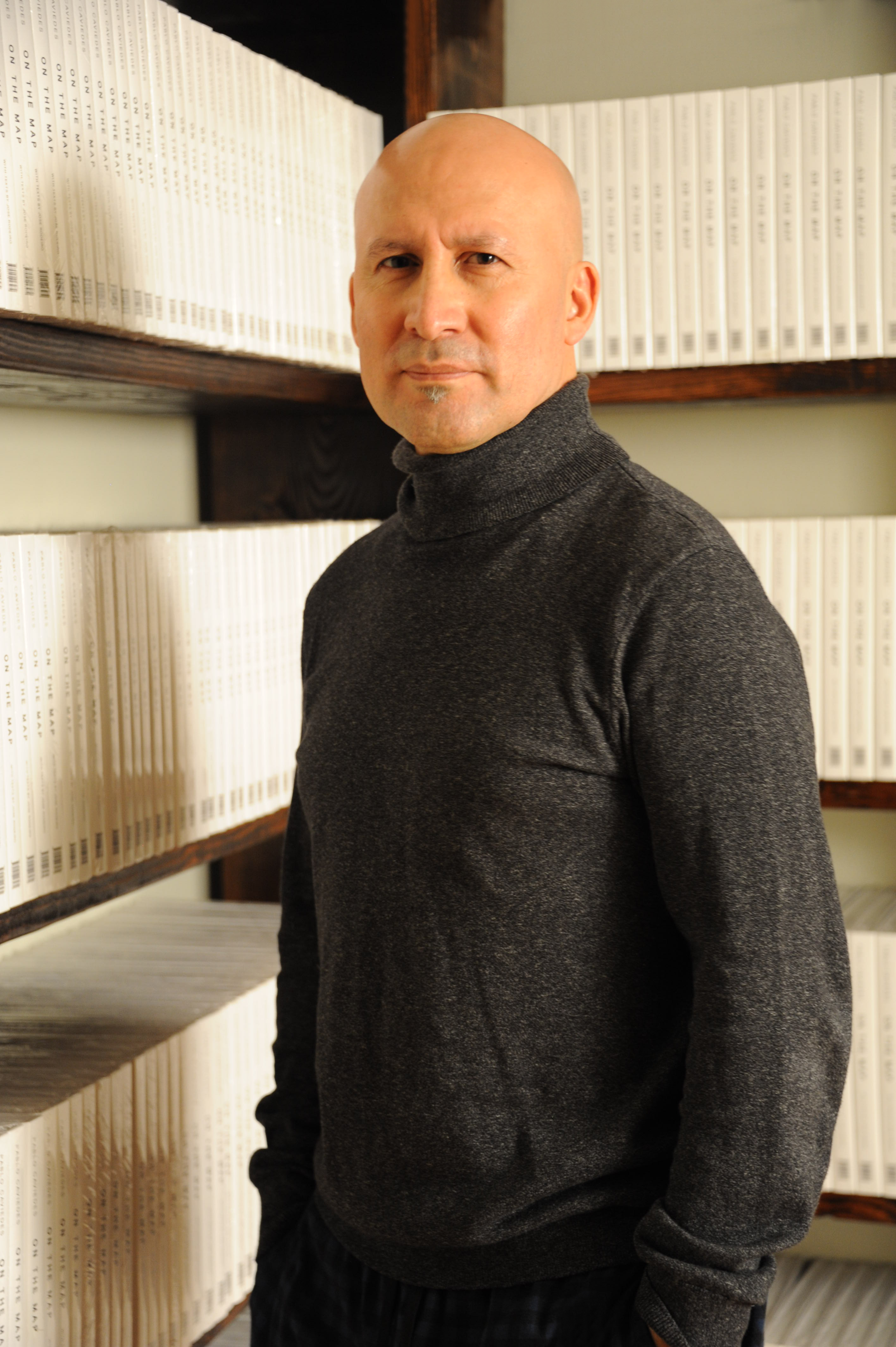
- Caviedes in 2021
- Born: 1971 (age 54–55); Cotacachi, Ecuador
- Education: École Nationale Supérieure des Beaux-Arts; Instituto Superior Tecnologico de Artes Plasticas Daniel Reyes
- Notable work: On The Map
- Style: Contemporary

Pablo Caviedes was born in 1971 in Cotacachi, Ecuador and lives and works in New York City. He is a multidisciplinary artist who works across various media such as painting, video art, drawing, etching, installation and sculpture. He is considered part of the 21st Century US-Latino transcultural art-scene. His work focuses on social issues such as immigration, displacement and identity.

He has exhibited in Ecuador, France, Spain, Poland, Italy, Puerto Rico, Argentina and the United States.

He studied at the Instituto Superior Tecnológico de Artes Plásticas Daniel Reyes in San Antonio de Ibarra, Ecuador and at the École Nationale Supérieure des Beaux-Arts, in Paris, France.

== Career ==
In 1994, he received the Paris Prize. In 1998 he was part of a group of artists under the age of 40 participating in an exhibition titled Emergent Artists from Latin America and the Caribbean that identified a new generation of up-and-coming Latino artists.

In 2002, while living in Barcelona, Spain, he had a solo show at the Capellades Paper Mili Museum. During that time he was awarded an honorable mention at the Second Biennial International of Painting in Vilassar de Mar, Barcelona, Spain.

In 2009 he participated in the exhibitions Fusion: American Classics Meet Latin American Art, at the Biggs Museum of American Art, Dover, Delaware, and the Ecuadorian Contemporary Art Show at the United Nations, New York.

In 2010, his installation was displayed in the 2nd Bronx Latin American Art Biennial in New York City .

The same year he participated in the We Are You (WAY) Project, in Jersey City, New Jersey, a group project that focused on immigration reform issues. This participation inspired his "On the Map" image, created in 2011 for the exhibition WAY Project International, at Wilmer Jennings Gallery in New York City. The same image was subsequently used by Caviedes in a variety of different media such as video, sculpture, etching and painting.

In 2010 he participated in an exhibition titled RENY 2010 that took place at the Queens Museum, and explored concepts of immigration and identity.

In 2011 he had his first solo show in Washington DC, at Studio H Gallery where he explored concepts of natural and artificial boundaries.

In 2012, his animated-film "On the Map" was selected for the A Frame Apart 2 Short-Film Festival, at the Queens Museum, New York City. Moreover, this film was presented at the International Exhibition on Human Rights, Lecce, Italy; as well as the worldwide #Migrantes Exhibition, Trento, Italy; 2013.

In 2013 he participated in an exhibition titled Immigrant Too at the NOMAA Gallery in New York. The exhibition explored issues of immigration as they relate to personal, public and political spaces. The same year he exhibited paintings from his Nomada series at Wirydarz GallerySztuki, Lublin, Poland.

In 2014, back in New York again, the film was shown at two of the 4th Bronx Latin American Art Biennial venues: Edgar Allan Poe Park Visitor Center Gallery and Bronx Museum of the Arts.

The same year he showed paintings of horse-headed figures riding bulls at the Fountain Street Fine Art Gallery in Framingham in an exhibition of Latino artists from around the world.

In 2015, Caviedes presented his works at the AQ Art Fair in Quito, Ecuador. That same year, he exhibited his sculptures in the Remembering Things Past Exhibition at the Islip Art Museum, in New York.

In 2016 Caviedes presented his Nomada series in a solo show at the Quantum Gallery in Warsaw, Poland.

The same year he was part of a group exhibition titled Diversity, at Fondazione Opera Campana Dei Caduti, Trento, Italy. The exhibition explored issues of human rights and was supported by the UNESCO.

The same exhibition was presented in France in 2018.

His short animation movie Pop Art - On the Map, was presented in the exhibitions International Exhibition on Human Rights Diversity in Trento, Italy and the Navigare i confini/MigrArti exhibition, in Cagliari, Sardigna, Italy.

This movie was also part of the project Contemporary Visions Videoart in Loop and was presented at several venues around the world such as: Genova, Milano, Napoli, Palermo, Perugia, Rome, Salerno, Torino, Verona, in Italy; Murcia, Portugal; Aveiro, Spain; Mendoza, Argentina; Thessaloniki, Greece; Sofia, Belgrade, Serbia; Bulgaria; Bristol, United Kingdom; Polnà, Czech Republic; and Casablanca, Morocco.

The film was presented at the 29th Festival Les Instants Vidéo in Marseille, France.

In 2015 he exhibited in a group exhibition titled “Remembering Things Past” at the Islip Museum, Islip, New York.

In 2017 through the representation of ARTI.NYC Gallery, Caviedes's art began to receive more exposure with some international art fairs, such as Secret Garden Art Festival, Frieze Art Fair, Superfine Art Fair, in New York City, followed by Spectrum International Art Fair in Miami.

In 2018 Caviedes displayed several of his On the Map pieces at the Art Palm Beach International Art Fair in Palm Beach.

His On the Map Obama's Portrait in 3D was shown at the Scope International Art Fair, in New York City. In 2018 the documentary film Pablo Caviedes ON THE MAP produced and directed by PH Daniel Sanchez was presented at the Third Inwood Film Festival in New York City.

At the beginning of 2019 the Ministry of Culture and Heritage of Ecuador published and officially presented the book titled Pablo Caviedes On the Map, with text by Jose Rodeiro.

His pen on white cardboard series of drawings was exhibited at the Lehman College Art Gallery as part of the New York Latin American Art Triennial 2019.

In 2019 his work was included in the book titled Deriva by Graciela Kartofel.

The same year he had a solo show at Mit Gallery & Wirydarz Gallery, Kazimierz Dolny in Poland.

In 2020, Caviedes's On the Map book and the documentary was presented at the American Center for Arts & Culture in Paris, France.

In 2020 he participated in a group exhibition at the Museo Antropológico y de Arte Contemporáneo (MAAC). The same year he participated in a group exhibition at Centro Cultural El Cuartel.

Caviedes is a member of the New York based artists collective ArteLatAm

In 2021 he was a participating artist in a group exhibition titled “Social Reckoning” at the Clemente Velez Soto Cultural Center in New York. It was curated by Alexis Mendoza and presented in collaboration with NYU and Univision, to honor Martin Luther King Jr. The same year Caviedes presented his book, a documentary film, animation art videos and pieces from his On The Map project as part of the Human Crossing project at the Fondazione Opera Campana dei Caduti Museum in Trento, Italy.
