= Battle of Guadix =

1362 battle in Spain

- Part of Reconquista
Date	January 1362
Location	Guadix, Province of Granada, Spain 37.3°N 3.13°W
Result	Muslim victory

Belligerents
Kingdom of Castile; Kingdom of Jaén; Order of Calatrava	Emirate of Granada

Strength
16,500	4,600
- Location of Guadix in Spain

Emirate of Granada showing territory lost between 1292 and 1462. Guadix is to the east of the city of Granada

The Battle of Guadix was an engagement between Castilian and Granadan forces at Guadix, then in the Emirate of Granada and now in Spain, that took place in January 1362. The Castilians were routed by forces loyal to Muhammed VI, Sultan of Granada. Despite his victory, Muhammed VI soon after sued for peace. He was murdered on the orders of King Peter of Castile.

== Background ==
Muhammed V of Granada was dethroned in 1359, but escaped to Guadix, and from there to Morocco where he was protected by Ibrahim ibn Ali, Abu Salim. His younger brother took power as Isma'il II, but was assassinated a few months later on the orders of his distant cousin Isma'il bin Nasr, abu-Sa'id, who took the throne as Muhammed VI. Soon after taking power, Muhammed VI lost a battle against a Christian force at Guadix. In the summer of 1361 Abu Salim and King Peter of Castile ("the Cruel") supported Muhammed V in an attempt to regain his throne. In December 1361 a Castilian army of 6,000 men took a number of towns in Granada.

== Battle ==
In January 1362 a force of about 2,600 Castilians attacked a force of 4,600 Muslims at Guadix. The Castilians had about 1,000 cavalry and 2,000 foot soldiers. They were led by Diego García de Padilla, Master of the Order of Calatrava and adelantado mayor of the Frontier, Enrique Enríquez the Younger, commanding the forces of the Bishop of Jaén, Men Rodríguez de Biedma and other noblemen. The chronicler Pero López de Ayala said the Castilians had low morale because the king had unjustly taken valuable Moorish prisoners from them that they had captured the previous year. The omens were also unfavorable, which was deeply disturbing to the superstitious soldiers.

When they arrived in sight of Guadix the Christians did not see any sign of the enemy, and divided into two troops. One remained in battle order beside a small river, while the other marched towards Alhama. The Moors had been warned of the advance. Six hundred cavalry and four thousand foot soldiers had been moved secretly to Guadix to reinforce the garrison of the town. When the Castilian detachment sent to Alhama came into sight, the Moors attacked, but at first only showed part of their forces. Other troops emerged from Guadix unseen, hidden by hedges and gardens.

There was a bridge with a high arch between the two armies, and the action began there. The Granadans crossed this bridge, but were violently thrown back. About 200 Castilian cavalry pursued them, found themselves surrounded by infantry who had come out from the town, and were repelled in turn. They rallied at the entrance to the bridge and took a stand for a while, calling for help. Padilla and Enríquez, who had not realized the enemy strength, rashly abandoned the bridge, thinking they could easily dispose of any Moors who crossed it.

The Castilian soldiers did not understand the purpose of this maneuver. When they saw that the Moors had taken the bridge, they panicked and fled. The Moors followed up. The Castilian cavalry tried to cover the retreat while the Moors were engaged in looting the baggage, but were too few in number to resist the growing number of Moors crossing the river. Night fell but the uneven struggle continued. Padilla was wounded in one arm and taken prisoner with eight of his fellow knights. Enrique Enríquez got back to the frontier with what was left of his small army. The Castilians had been decisively defeated. The commander of the Order of Santiago force, Diego Fernández de Jaén, was dead.

== Aftermath ==
Muhammed VI released Diego García de Padilla and the eight other friars of Calatrava soon after the battle. Despite the unexpected victory, Muhammed VI was concerned that the result of the defeat would be to make Peter of Castile determined on revenge, and that Christian knights from other countries would be drawn by the prospect of glory and booty. Muhammed VI's ally King Peter IV of Aragon abandoned him and sent 400 lances to assist Castile. Muhammed VI sought peace with Peter of Castile, who had him murdered in April 1362. Muhammed V regained control of Granada in 1362. He maintained an alliance with Peter of Castile, and helped him in his war against King Peter IV of Aragon.
