= María Cadilla =

Puerto Rican writer, educator, women's rights activist

María Cadilla Colón de Martínez
- Dr. Maria Cadilla Colón de Martínez
- Born: María Cadilla Colón; December 21, 1884; Arecibo, Puerto Rico
- Died: August 23, 1951 (aged 66); Arecibo, Puerto Rico
- Occupations: Writer, educator and women's rights activist
- Spouse: Julio Tomás Martínez

Notes
- Cadilla was one of the first women in Puerto Rico to earn a doctoral degree.

Dr. María Cadilla Colón de Martínez (December 21, 1884 – August 23, 1951) was a Puerto Rican writer, educator, women's rights activist and one of the first women in Puerto Rico to earn a doctoral degree.

== Early years ==
Cadilla lived with her parents, Armando Cadilla Fernández and Catalina Colón Nieves, in the northwestern town of Arecibo, Puerto Rico, where she was born. There she received her primary and secondary education. As a child she became interested in writing stories which she shared with her classmates. In 1902, she graduated from high school and enrolled in the University of Puerto Rico.

In 1906, Cadilla earned her bachelor's degree in Arts and Education. She taught school in some of the towns surrounding the San Juan metropolitan area. After a short period of time, Cadilla went to the United States where she earned her teachers degree. She attended the Academy of Francisco Oller and took classes in plastic arts, after she returned to the island. The Atheneum of Puerto Rico awarded her a prize for one of her works in 1914. Cadilla earned her master's degree from the University of Puerto Rico. She went to Spain where she attended the Central University of Madrid. Among her professors were the Spanish writer Américo Castro and poet Dámaso Alonso. She earned her doctoral degree in 1933 with the thesis La Poesia Popular de Puerto Rico (The Popular Poetry of Puerto Rico).

== Educator ==
When Cadilla returned to Puerto Rico, she was hired by her alma mater, where she taught history and literature. She was also named principal of a local school in her hometown, which required that she often travel to Arecibo. Cadilla dedicated many hours of her spare time investigating Puerto Rico's folklore.

The city of Arecibo paid tribute to her by naming a high school after her: Escuela Superior Dra. Maria Cadilla de Martinez.

== Written works ==
The following are some of Cadilla's written works:

- Cuentos a Lilliam (1925)
- Cazadera en el Alba (1933)
- La Poesia Popular de Puerto Rico (1933, The Popular Poetry of Puerto Rico)
- La Campesina de Puerto Rico (1937, The farmwoman of Puerto Rico)
- Costumbres y tradiciones de mi tierra (1938, Customs and traditions of my land)
- Cuentos y Juegos infantiles de Puerto Rico (1940, Children's Stories and games from Puerto Rico)
- Alturas Paralelas (1941)
- Hitos de la Raza (1945), a book that won an award from the Puerto Rican Institute of Culture
- Rememorando el Pasado Histórico (1946)

== Women rights activist ==
Cadilla was also a women's rights activist. She belonged to the Civic League of Puerto Rico and the Association of Women Voters. As a member of these organizations, she fought for women's right to vote.

Cadilla was a member of the Academy of History of Puerto Rico and of the Dominican Republic; the folklore societies of Mexico and Uruguay and of the Academy of History of France. She received awards and recognitions from Puerto Rico, Argentina, the United States and India. Cadilla died on August 23, 1951, in her hometown, Arecibo.

== Death ==
Cadilla died on August 23, 1951 at the age of 66. She was buried at the Arecibo Municipal Cemetery.

== Legacy ==
Arecibo honored her memory by naming a high school and an avenue after her. Ohio State University Library dedicated December 21, 2002, to María Cadilla in its Universal Human Rights Month.

== See also ==
- List of Puerto Ricans
- History of women in Puerto Rico
