= Diego García de Padilla =

Spanish nobleman (died 1368)

- Died: 1368; Alcalá de Guadaira Castle
- Occupation: Nobleman
- Known for: Master of the Order of Calatrava

Diego García de Padilla (died 1368) was a Spanish nobleman who became Master of the Order of Calatrava. His sister María de Padilla was the wife of King Peter of Castile, the Cruel. Padilla fought for Peter of Castile in the wars against Aragon and Granada. In the Castilian Civil War (1366–69) he went over to the side of Henry of Trastámara.

== Early years ==
Diego García de Padilla y Villágera was the son of Juan Diego García de Padilla and María Gómez de Hinestrosa. He belonged to a collateral branch of the Padilla family, the lords of Villágera. His sister was María Díaz de Padilla (1333-1361), who became the King's lover. His brother, Juan García de Padilla, was made nominal Master of the Order of Santiago by the King.

Diego García de Padilla was elected Master of Calatrava in 1355 at the request of Peter of Castile. Padilla had his predecessor, Juan Núñez de Prado, put to death. The "War of the Two Pedros", a struggle between Pere III of Aragon and Peter of Castile, began in 1356 and would last until 1366. On the southern frontier of Aragon, forces led by Padilla sacked Jinosa and Monòver in August 1356. In 1357 Padilla was made Mayordomo mayor to Peter of Castile, replacing Juan Fernández de Henestrosa as the head of the king's household. In this influential position he was in charge of all activities at the court, and kept the kings's accounts.

== Granadan campaign ==
In 1361 the deposed Emir of Granada, Muhammad V, obtained the support of Peter of Castille in regaining his throne. Padilla defeated a Moorish army of 2000 foot and 600 cavalry in the Battle of Linuesa on the eve of St. Thomas, 1361. In January 1362, as Master of the Order of Calatrava and adelantado mayor of the Frontier, he was one of the leaders of the Castilian forces at the Battle of Guadix, along with Enrique Enríquez the Younger, commanding the forces of the Bishop of Jaén, Men Rodríguez de Biedma and other noblemen. The chronicler Pero López de Ayala said the Castilians had low morale because the king had unjustly taken valuable Moorish prisoners from them that they had captured the previous year. The Castilians were decisively defeated by troops of the Emirate of Granada. Padilla was wounded in one arm and taken prisoner with eight of his fellow knights. He was released soon after the battle.

== Later career ==
In the spring of 1362 Diego García de Padilla was among the notables who said they had witnessed a private marriage between Pedro and Padilla's sister María. For this reason, the King's later marriage to Blanche of Bourbon had been illegal, and María's children were legitimate. Padilla remained mayordomo until 1363. In 1366 the Castilian Civil War began when Henry of Trastámara, natural son of King Alfonso XI of Castile, fought his older half brother Peter of Castile to usurp the throne. After being crowned at Burgos, Henry made his way to Toledo. Padilla came over to Henry's side at this time. After the Battle of Nájera (3 April 1367), Peter sent him as a prisoner to Alcalá de Guadaíra Castle near Seville, where he died in 1368.
