= Barcarrota =

- Coat of arms

- Location of Barcarrota within Extremadura
- Coordinates: 38°30′53″N 6°50′55″W
- Country: Spain
- Autonomous community: Extremadura
- Province: Badajoz
- Comarca: Llanos de Olivenza

Government
  - Alcalde: Santiago Manuel Cuadrado Rodríguez

Area
  - Total: 136.1 km^{2} (52.5 sq mi)
- Elevation: 467 m (1,532 ft)

Population (2025-01-01)
  - Total: 3,456
- Time zone: UTC+1 (CET)
  - Summer (DST): UTC+2 (CEST)
- Website: Ayuntamiento de Barcarrota

Barcarrota is a Spanish municipality in the province of Badajoz, Extremadura. It has a population of 3,664 (2007) and an area of 136.1 km^{2} (52.5 sq mi).

Barcarrota was the location of the Battle of Villanueva de Barcarrota (1336), in which Castilian troops decisively defeated a Portuguese army.

It was claimed by Inca Garcilaso de la Vega, likely incorrectly, to be the birthplace of Hernando de Soto.

== See also ==
- List of municipalities in Badajoz
