= Friedrich Ernst Scheller =

German jurist and politician

Member of the Frankfurt Parliament
- In office 1848–1849

Personal details
- Born: 15 November 1791 Gut Klettenberg, near Hohenstein, Thuringia
- Died: 21 December 1869 (aged 78) Frankfurt (Oder)
- Education: University of Göttingen

Friedrich Ernst Scheller (15 November 1791 – 21 December 1869) was a German jurist and politician. He served as a member of the Frankfurt Parliament.

Scheller studied jurisprudence at the University of Göttingen from 1809 until 1813 and graduated as a lawyer. The following year, he became a judge in Aachen, a job he carried out until 1816, when he became president of the Krefeld courts of justice. Further work took Scheller to Halberstadt and Berlin, and later to Frankfurt (Oder). On 18 May 1848, he was elected to the Frankfurt Parliament and also served two years as a member of the Preußischer Landtag. Scheller retired in 1869 and died a short time afterwards, aged 78.
