= Peal de Becerro =

Peal de Becerro, Spain
- city
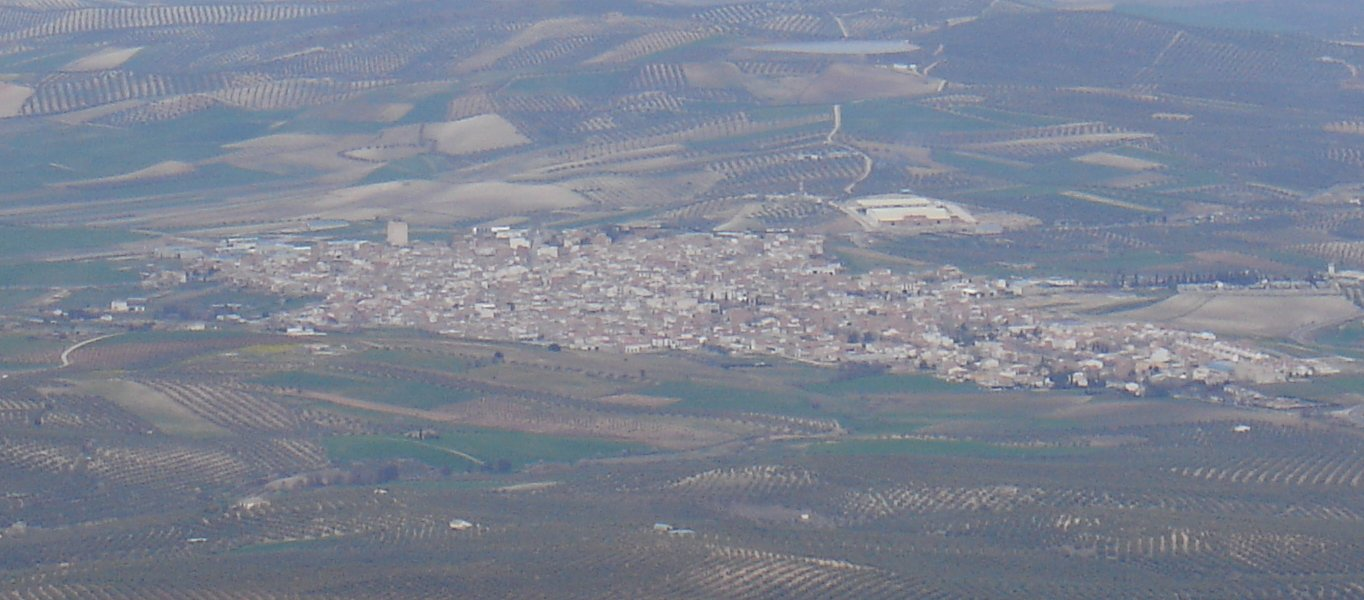

- Flag Coat of arms

- Location in the Province of Jaén Peal de Becerro (Andalusia) Peal de Becerro (Spain)
- Coordinates: 37°54′N 3°07′W
- Country: Spain
- Autonomous community: Andalusia
- Province: Jaén
- Municipality: Peal de Becerro

Area
  - Total: 147 km^{2} (57 sq mi)
- Elevation: 550 m (1,800 ft)

Population (2025-01-01)
  - Total: 5,290
  - Density: 36.0/km^{2} (93.2/sq mi)
- Time zone: UTC+1 (CET)
  - Summer (DST): UTC+2 (CEST)

Peal de Becerro is a city located in the province of Jaén, Spain. According to the 2005 census (INE), the city has a population of 5470 inhabitants.

== See also ==
- List of municipalities in Jaén
