= La Puebla de los Infantes =

La Puebla de los Infantes, Spain
- City
- Coat of arms
- Interactive map of La Puebla de los Infantes, Spain
- Coordinates: 37°46′N 5°23′W
- Country: Spain
- Province: Seville
- Municipality: La Puebla de los Infantes

Area
  - Total: 155 km^{2} (60 sq mi)
- Elevation: 230 m (750 ft)

Population (2025-01-01)
  - Total: 2,949
  - Density: 19.0/km^{2} (49.3/sq mi)
- Time zone: UTC+1 (CET)
  - Summer (DST): UTC+2 (CEST)

La Puebla de los Infantes is a city located in the province of Seville, Spain. According to the 2005 census (INE), the city has a population of 3263 inhabitants.

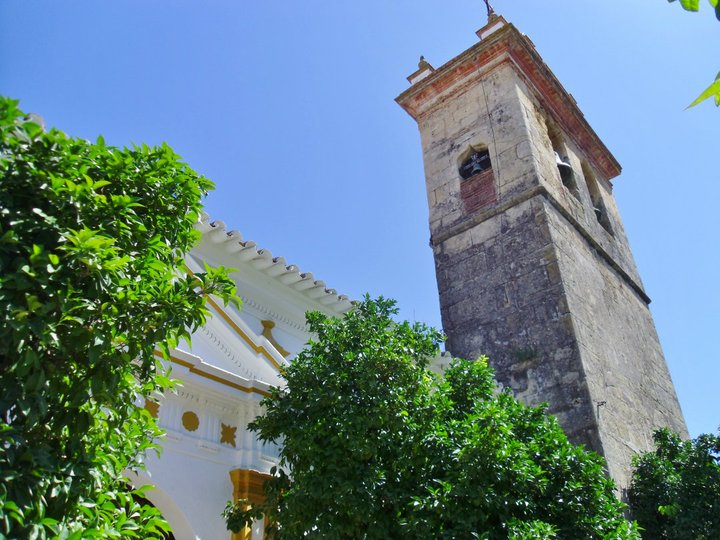
Exterior of the Church of Our Lady of Las Huertas in La Puebla de los Infantes, Seville, Spain

== See also ==
- List of municipalities in Seville
