= Huesa =

Huesa, Spain
- city
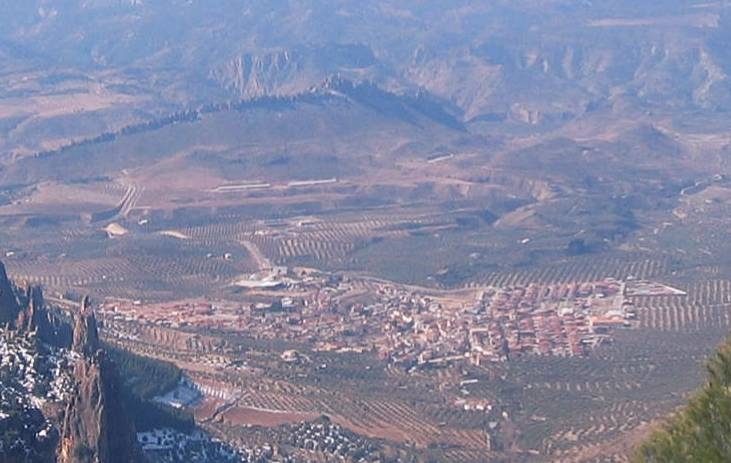

- Coat of arms

- Location in the Province of Jaén Huesa (Andalusia) Huesa (Spain)
- Coordinates: 37°46′N 3°04′W
- Country: Spain
- Autonomous community: Andalusia
- Province: Jaén
- Municipality: Huesa

Area
  - Total: 137 km^{2} (53 sq mi)
- Elevation: 655 m (2,149 ft)

Population (2025-01-01)
  - Total: 2,411
  - Density: 17.6/km^{2} (45.6/sq mi)
- Time zone: UTC+1 (CET)
  - Summer (DST): UTC+2 (CEST)

Huesa is a city located in the province of Jaén, Spain. According to the 2005 census (INE), the city had a population of 2,727 inhabitants.

Its principal agricultural activity is cultivating olives.

== Demographic ==
Historical population

Year	Pop.	±%
1991	2,606	—
1996	2,764	+6.1%

Year	Pop.	±%
2001	2,732	−1.2%
2004	2,743	+0.4%

== See also ==
- List of municipalities in Jaén
