= Franck de Las Mercedes =

Nicaraguan-American painter

Franck de las Mercedes
- Born: 1972 (age 53–54); Masaya, Nicaragua
- Other name: FdlM
- Education: Self-taught (Mid-Manhattan Public Library)
- Known for: Visual art, painting, photography, poetry
- Notable work: The Priority Boxes Art Project, Primogénito
- Movement: Abstract expressionism
- Awards: Joint Legislative Resolution, New Jersey Senate and General Assembly (2014)
- Website: fdlmstudio.com

Franck de las Mercedes (born 1972 in Masaya, Nicaragua) is a Nicaraguan American visual artist, poet and photographer who lives and works in New York City. Franck's experience as a child in war-torn Nicaragua, the visual clash of New York's graffiti and an interest in the abstract expressionism movement played a major role in de las Mercedes becoming a visual artist. With a self-obtained education, straight from the aisles of the Mid-Manhattan Public Library, Franck de las Mercedes has emerged as one of the country's most prolific artists in recent years. Incorporating elements of photography, drawings, journal pages and text art, Franck creates frenetic paintings with energetic abstractions bursting with color. FdlM draws inspiration from his New York backdrop and the effect that time and the elements have on urban surfaces. Referencing past experiences, trauma and family relationships in real life and literature, he creates psychologically-charged imagery.

In 2006, Franck initiated The Priority Boxes Art Project a peace initiative that has evolved into a movement now embraced by popular culture, mainstream media outlets, schools and art educators across America. From his small studio near the Hudson River, the artist ships abstractly painted, seemingly empty boxes with a label that reads: «Fragile, handle with care: Contains peace» to people around the world. The boxes aim to spark dialogue and challenge people to reconsider their ability to influence change and question the fragility, value and priority given to concepts such as peace. De las Mercedes has shipped more than 12,300 boxes to countries and cities across the globe from urban and rural America to Asia and South Africa. "The Peace Boxes" have traveled the globe, been taught in classrooms and featured on the iconic LED screens of Times Square.

Despite his American upbringing, Nicaraguan born FdlM is regarded as one of Nicaragua's most important contemporary artists. Franck and his work have been featured on numerous national and international television and radio shows including, LatiNation, CNN En Español, Noticiero Telemundo and Univision's "Aqui y Ahora." He's also been featured in prestigious publications including, Selecciones (Reader's Digest), Art Business News, Hispanic Magazine, SoulPancake, Museum VIEWS, American Style and The Artist's magazine, Blick Art Materials' Spring 2013 Featured Artist, Town & Country, The Daily Beast and Good Day New York on Fox 5.

FdlM's work has been exhibited in numerous solo shows and group shows around the world. In 2012, his portrait of Francisco de Quevedo was acquired by Fundación Francisco de Quevedo for their permanent collection in Ciudad Real, Spain.

On Tuesday, February 18, 2014 a massive fire ripped through his home and the home of The FDLM Art Studio. Escaping the flames with only the clothes on his back, the fire destroyed his entire life's work and possessions. For 12 years, 217 Hackensack Plank Rd. was home to Franck and his wife Nicola, art studio and the birthplace of The Priority Boxes Art Project. His loft was completely destroyed, the building gutted and later demolished. Franck has since relocated to New York City.

In the spring of 2014, Franck's "Post No Bills" egg was part of the Fabergé Big Egg Hunt NY 2014. A citywide public exhibit that featured over 250 large egg sculptures – placed throughout New York City, each designed by globally renowned artists and designers. In October 2014, The New Jersey Senate and General Assembly passed a joint legislative resolution honoring Franck and the Peace Boxes Project, commending him for his meritorious record of service, leadership, and commitment in the arts and his community.

In 2015 Franck was named one of "15 Artists About to Dominate 2015" by Complex magazine.

In 2018 Franck participated in the Sing For Hope project, which placed hundreds of pianos around New York City and invited artists to decorate them.

In March 2023, Franck published his first book of poetry in Spanish titled «Primogénito». A retrospective of poems tackling his childhood in war-torn Nicaragua, a troubled youth and overcoming adversity through art.

He has been a resident of Weehawken, New Jersey.
