= Villalba de los Barros =

- municipality
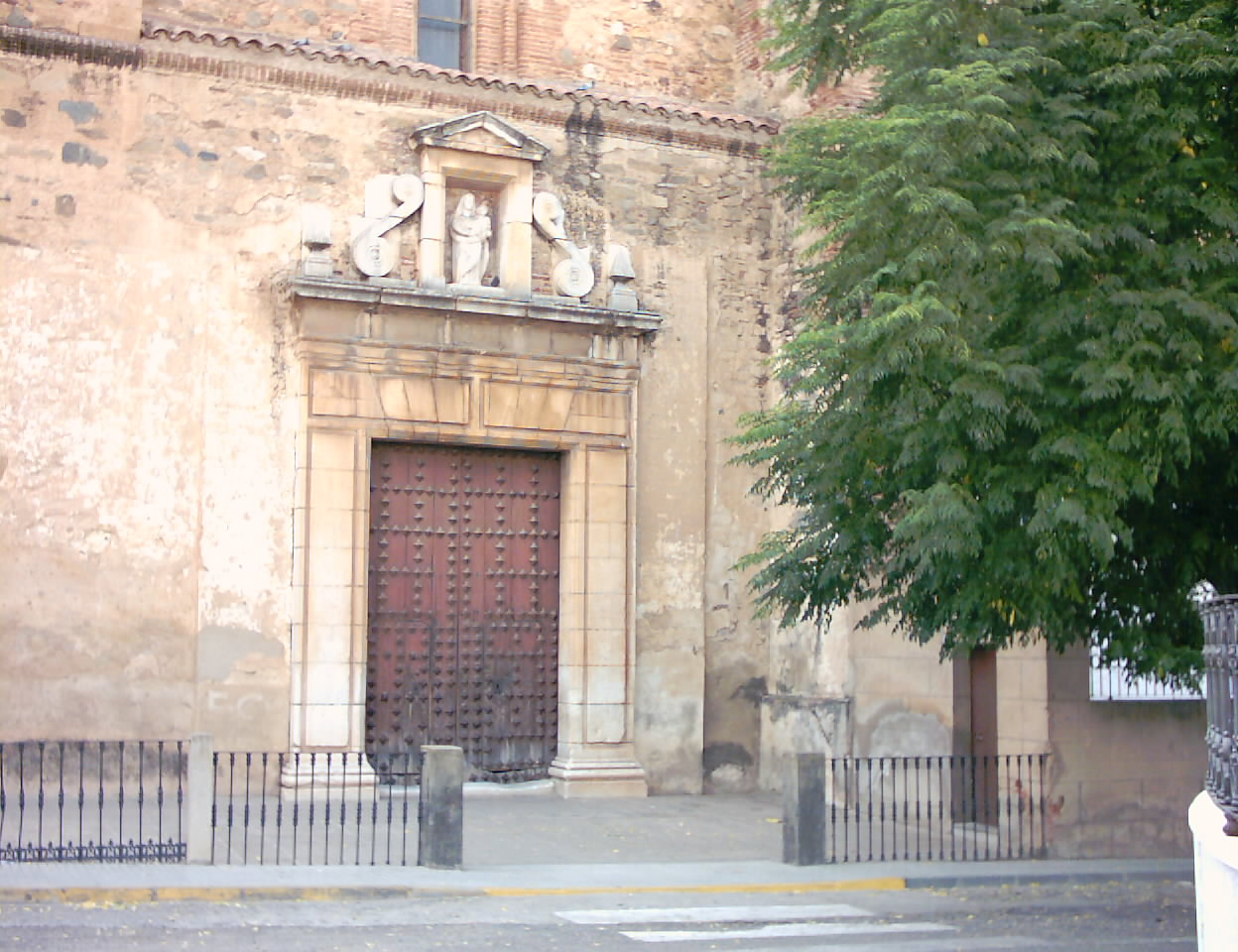

- Flag Coat of arms

- Location in Spain
- Coordinates: 38°37′N 6°30′W
- Country: Spain
- Autonomous community: Extremadura
- Province: Badajoz

Area
  - Total: 91 km^{2} (35 sq mi)
- Elevation: 307 m (1,007 ft)

Population (2025-01-01)
  - Total: 1,429
  - Density: 16/km^{2} (41/sq mi)
- Time zone: UTC+1 (CET)
  - Summer (DST): UTC+2 (CEST)

Villalba de los Barros is a municipality located in the province of Badajoz, Extremadura, Spain. As of the 2018 census, the municipality has a population of 1,504 inhabitants.

== See also ==
- List of municipalities in Badajoz
