= House of Medina Sidonia =

Spanish noble house originated from the crown of Castile

House of Medina Sedonia
- Parent family: House of Guzmán House of Álvarez de Toledo González de Gregorio
- Founder: Guzmán el Bueno
- Current head: Leoncio Alonso González de Gregorio y Álvarez de Toledo
- Titles: Lordship of Sanlucar (1297) County of Niebla (1369); Duke of Medina Sidonia (1445); Marquisate of Gibraltar (1488-1501); Marquisate of Cazaza (1497); County of Saltés (1612) Marquisate of Valverde (1640)
- Connected families: House of Olivares
- Motto: Praeferre patriam liberis parentem decet (A father must put the fatherland before the children)

The House of Medina Sidonia (Spanish: Casa de Medina Sidonia) is a Spanish noble house originating from the crown of Castile, whose name comes from the Duke of Medina Sidonia, a hereditary noble title that John II of Castile granted to Juan Alonso Perez de Guzman, 3rd Count of Niebla, on February 17, 1445, as a reward for his services to the crown. The Dukedom of Medina Sidonia is the oldest hereditary dukedom in the kingdom of Spain.

The founder of the House of Medina Sidonia was Guzmán el Bueno, since he was the one who laid the foundations on which the house would be built. His descendants accumulated possessions and titles that increased the power of the lineage, which received the definitive backing in 1445 with the concession of the Dukedom of Medina Sidonia, which in 1520 was granted the original Grandee of Spain. In addition, the house gathered and gathered other titles, such as the Lordship of Sanlúcar, the County of Niebla, the Marquisate of Gibraltar, the Marquisate of Cazaza and the Marquisate of Valverde.

The House of Medina Sidonia was from its very beginning in the hands of the Pérez de Guzmán family, commonly known as the Guzmanes, until in 1779 it passed to the Álvarez de Toledo, when upon the death without descendants of Pedro de Alcántara Pérez de Guzmán y Pacheco, 14th Duke of Medina Sidonia, it was inherited by his cousin José Álvarez de Toledo y Gonzaga, XI Marquis of Villafranca del Bierzo, who also died without descendants, passing the barony of the House of Medina Sidonia to his brother Francisco de Borja Álvarez de Toledo y Gonzaga. Leoncio Alonso González de Gregorio y Álvarez de Toledo is the current Duke of Medina Sidonia, being the twenty-second person who has carried this title.

== History ==
=== Guzmán el Bueno, founder of the house and 1st Lord of Sanlúcar ===
Alonso Pérez de Guzmán, known as "El Bueno", was the founder of the House of Medina Sidonia, for, although he never held the title of Duke of Medina Sidonia, it was he who laid the foundations on which the House of Medina Sidonia was to be built over the centuries. His public life took place between 1276 and 1309. As a military man he intervened in the internal struggles of Marinid Morocco. After the North African incursions into Lower Andalusia in 1275, he mediated in the truce established between the Merinid sultan Yusuf and Alfonso X the Wise in 1276.

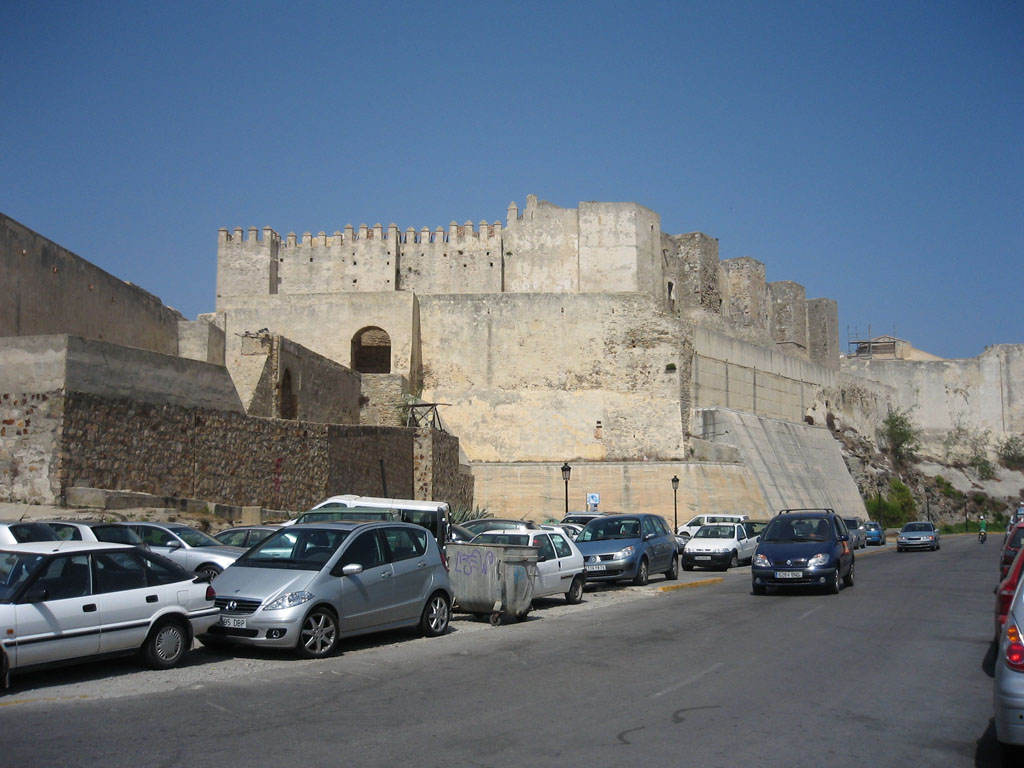
Castle of Tarifa, from which, according to legend, Guzmán el Bueno threw a knife so that his own son would be killed with it rather than succumb to blackmail by the besiegers. Transcendent event in the history of the house that marked its motto, Praeferre Patriam Liberis Parentem Decet (A father must put the fatherland before the children).

At the end of 1281 or beginning of 1282, he intervened in the pact between the aforementioned Yusuf and Alfonso X, by virtue of which the Merinid sultan would help the Castilian monarch against the rebellious infante Don Sancho. In 1282, the Wise King rewarded Guzmán's services with the villa of Alcalá Sidonia, today Alcalá de los Gazules, which he would exchange that same year for the Donadío de Monteagudo (today a cortijo in the municipality of Sanlúcar de Barrameda). In addition, the king married him to María Alfonso Coronel, a rich woman who would bring to the marriage a very important dowry, consisting of houses in the collation (parish) of Saint Michael in Seville, olive groves of Torrijos (today an estate in Valencina de la Concepción), olive groves of La Robaína (in Pilas), the town of Bollullos, the aceñas (flour mills) on the Guadalete River near Jerez de la Frontera, the vineyard of La Ina (today a rural neighborhood in Jerez de la Frontera) and the vineyard of El Barroso (today a cortijo in Jerez de la Frontera).

Later, in 1294, Sancho IV himself resorted to Guzman for the defense of Tarifa, a place threatened by the prince Don Juan, uncle of the monarch, with the help of the Merinids and Nasrids. There took place the famous heroic defense of Tarifa, with the death of the innocent son of Guzman turned into a legend. After the feat of Tarifa, Sancho IV verbally promised him the Lordship of Sanlúcar, whose term included the places and towns of Sanlúcar de Barrameda, Rota, Chipiona and Trebujena. However, it was not he but his son Ferdinand IV who made this grant effective in 1297. With time, Sanlúcar would become the main site of the house. In 1299 he received the grant of the almadraba of Conil and in 1303 the almadraba of Chiclana, whose respective villages he populated. In 1307 he received the Lordship of Vejer de la Frontera, in exchange for Zafra and Falconera, in Extremadura. He also received the Lordship of Marchena and a retention on the rents of Medina Sidonia.

At the death of Guzmán el Bueno in the mountains of Gaucín, fighting on the border with the Kingdom of Granada, the dimensions of his lordships and properties in the Sevillian alfoz of Aljarafe, the border area of Huelva, the Lower Guadalquivir and the area of Guadalete, made the House of Guzmán the most important lineage of the high nobility in Andalusia during the Late Middle Ages.

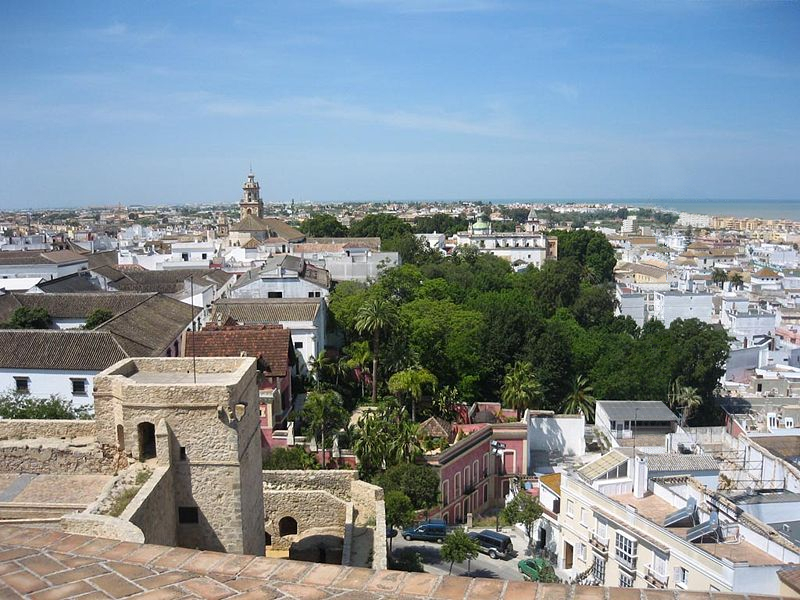
View of Sanlúcar de Barrameda, original manor and capital of the estates of the House of Medina Sidonia.

However, the house lost part of its original estates due to the marriage dowries and the will of María Alfonso Coronel given in 1330. By these means, her daughter Isabel Pérez de Guzmán, married to Fernán Ponce de León, contributed to the future House of Arcos the Lordship of Marchena, the retention on the rents of Medina Sidonia, the villas of Rota and Chipiona and, it seems, half of Ayamonte. Likewise, another daughter of the marriage, Leonor Pérez de Guzmán, married in 1306 to Luis de la Cerda, bequeathed to the future House of Medinaceli El Puerto de Santa María together with Villafranca, el Alijar and other estates.

=== County of Niebla ===
In 1369, King Henry II of Castile granted Juan Alfonso Perez de Guzman, 4th Lord of Sanlucar, the County of Niebla for his loyalty in the First Castilian Civil War that he had maintained with his half-brother Peter I the Cruel. In addition the king married him to one of his illegitimate daughters, linking the house with the Enriquez Family, therefore, with the House of Trastámara, incorporating to its coat of arms a border with the castles and lions typical of the Castilian-Leonese royal house. It was the first county with territorial jurisdiction that was granted to a nobleman outside the royal family.

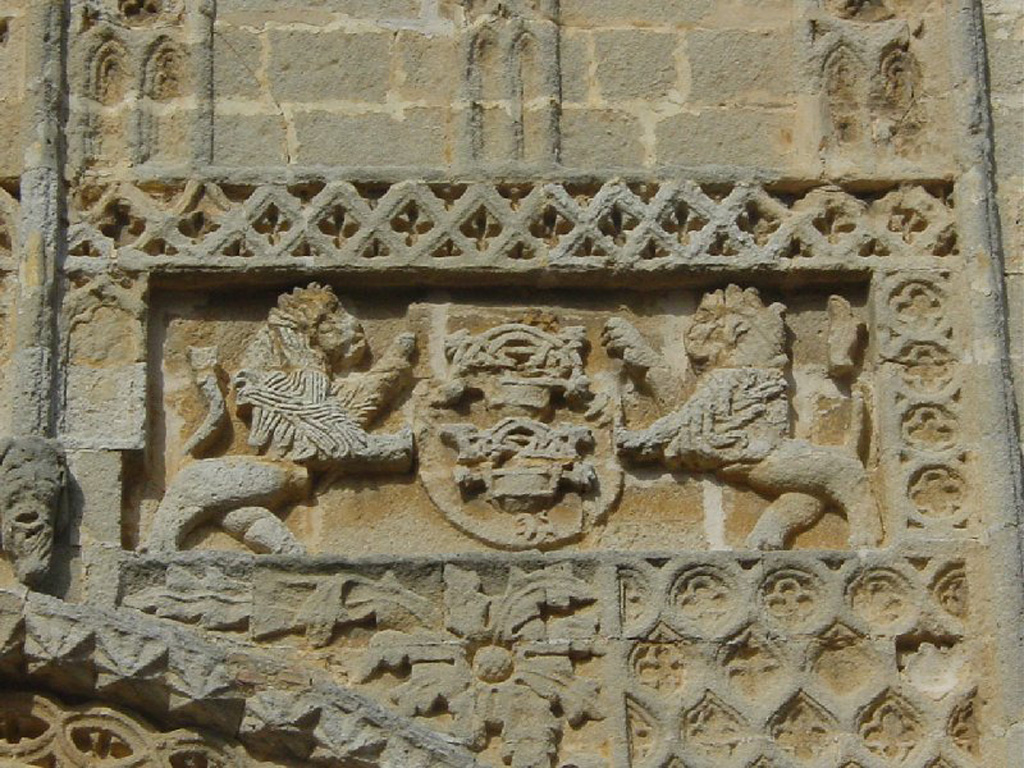
Coat of arms of the Guzmán lineage, Iglesia Mayor Parroquial de Ntra. Sra. de la O of Sanlúcar de Barrameda.

The Condado takes its name from the Huelva town of Niebla, and included the town of Niebla and its villages, namely: Trigueros and Beas, Rociana, Villarrasa, Lucena, Bonares, Calañas, Facanías (today Valverde del Camino), the farmstead of Juan Pérez (today in La Puebla de Guzmán), Paymogo and El Portechuelo, Peña Alhaje and the Campo de Andévalo.

All this gave the house a new great impulse, to which was added the institution of a Majorat on the part of the Count in 1371, with the real estate and jurisdictional goods that he had inherited together with those contributed in dowry by his wife.

=== Dukedom of Medina Sidonia ===
In 1440, John II exchanged to Juan Alfonso Perez de Guzman, 3rd Count of Niebla, the Lordship of La Algaba, Alaraz and El Vado de las Estacas for Medina Sidonia. In 1444, this count recovered for the entailed estate of Ayamonte, Lepe and La Redondela, places that had been separated from it in 1396. Likewise, during the crisis that John II had with the Infantes of Aragon, between 1441 and 1444, the 3rd Count supported the monarch so that the kingdom of Seville remained mostly in his favor, a service for which he was rewarded in 1445 with the concession of the Duke of Medina Sidonia. The granting of this title meant that the dignity of Count of Niebla was associated with the Duke's first-born son, destined to succeed him as head of the house, in a sort of internal "principality".

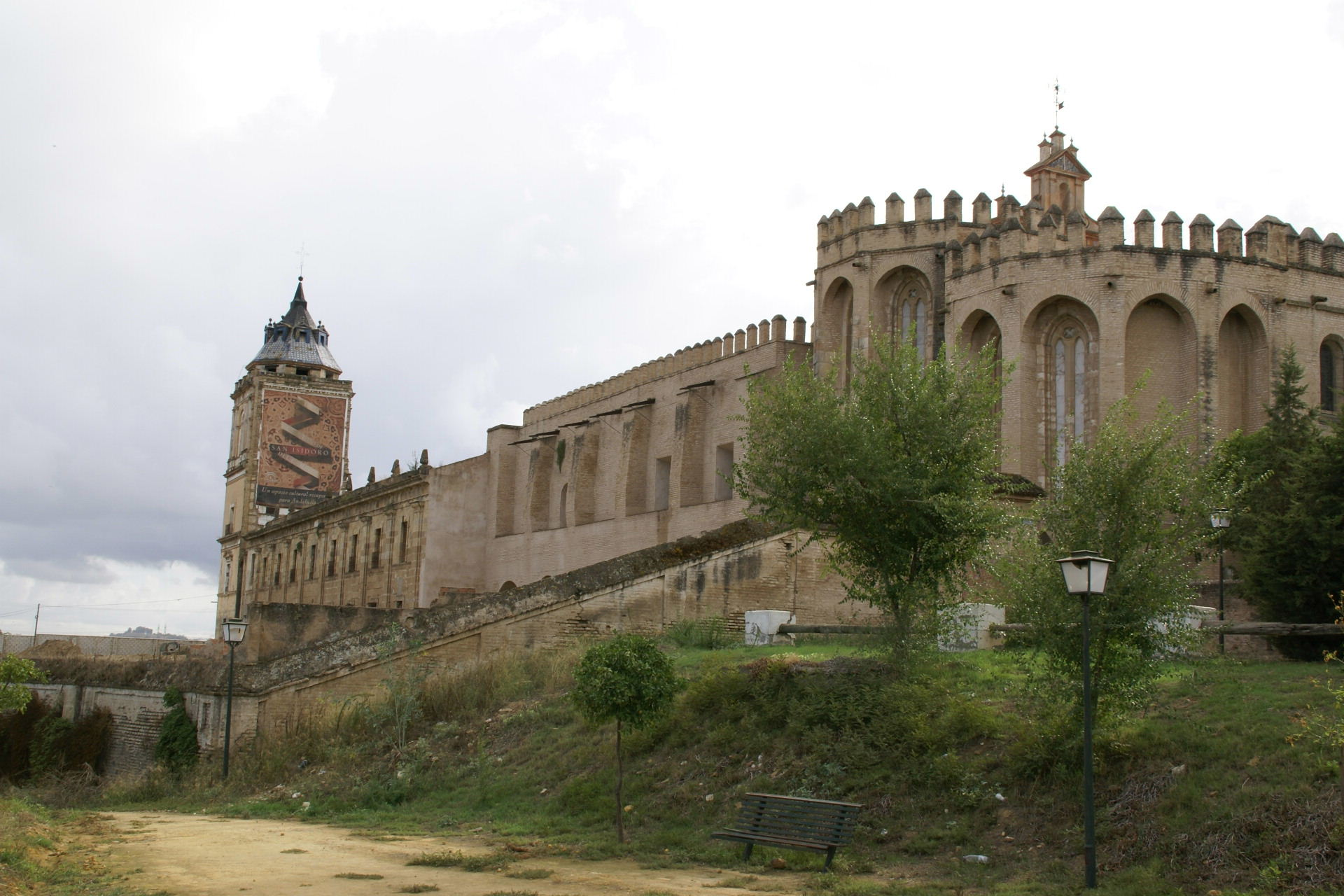
Monastery of San Isidoro del Campo in Santiponce, pantheon of Guzmán el Bueno and his wife María Alfonso Coronel.

In 1457, the 1st Duke, married to María de la Cerda, of the House of Medinaceli, established a entailed estate, with the King's permission, in favor of his bastard son Enrique, since he had no legitimate descendants with his wife. These circumstances would generate two long lawsuits in the house. The first one was maintained with the House of Medinaceli that demanded the return of the villa of Huelva, since Maria de la Cerda had contributed it to the marriage in dowry, but had died without having had children with the Duke. The return was not carried out and for that reason, around 1466, a long confrontation arose between both houses that would not end until 1509. The second lawsuit was with Teresa de Guzmán, Countess of Alba de Liste and sister of the 1st Duke, who despite having been previously compensated with Garrovillas de Alconétar, argued the bastardy of the Duke's son to claim half of Lepe and Ayamonte in 1462; places that had been recovered for the entailed estate of the house in 1444 and that had been separated from it again in 1454, to endow another Teresa, daughter of the 1st Duke. After a long period of claims, the Ayamonte lawsuit was settled in 1510.

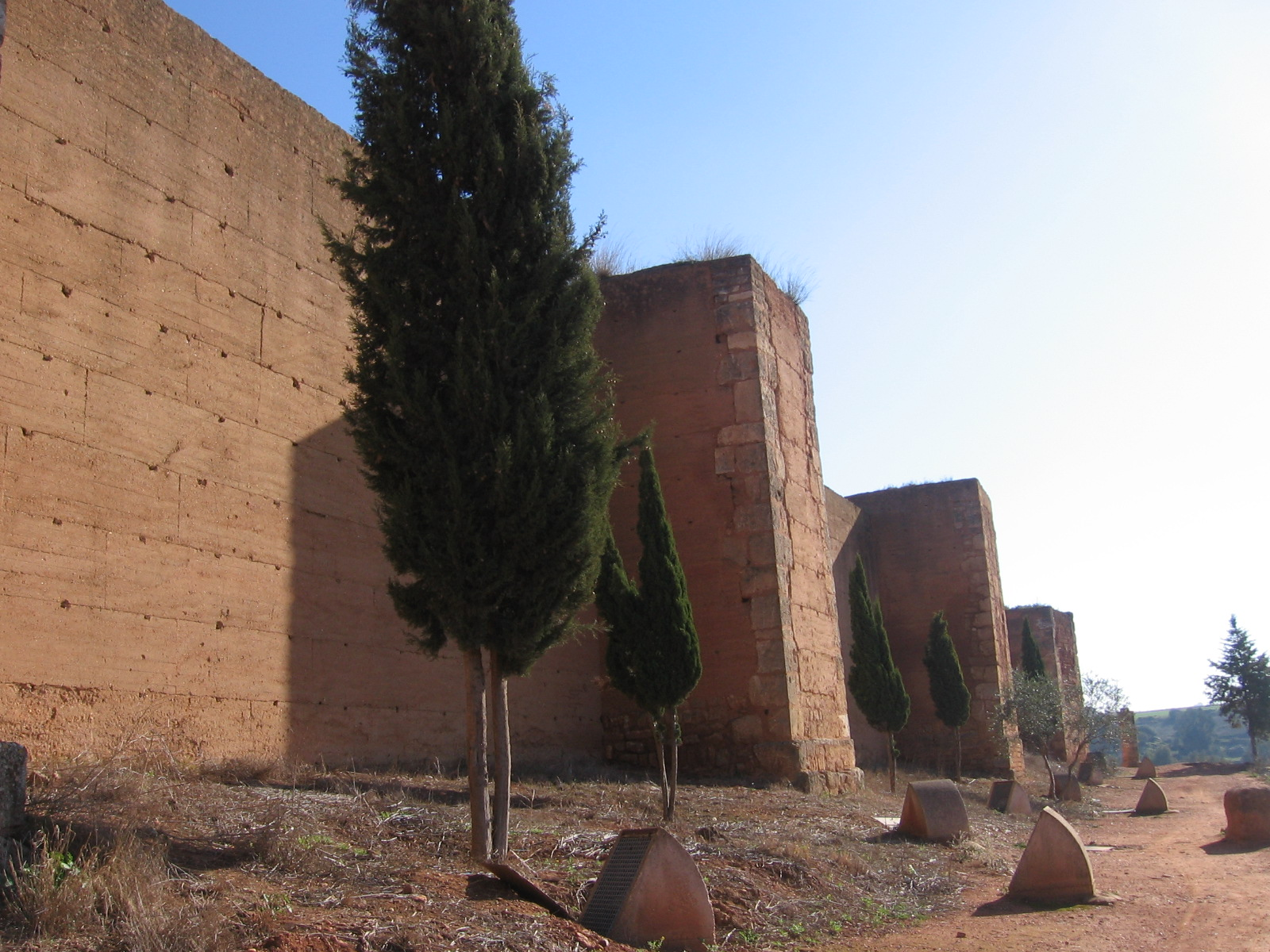
Walls of the town of Niebla, capital of the county with the same name, title held by the heir to the duchy of Medina Sidonia.

The instability caused by the civil war between Henry IV of Castile and his half brother Alfonso, was used by the house to expand its domains by annexing Gibraltar and Jimena. Gibraltar, which had been conquered from the Grenadians in 1462, passed to the house in 1467 by grant of Alfonso, who reigned as Alfonso XII, which did not prevent his opponent Henry IV to revalidate the grant in 1469 when he fully recovered the government. The attractiveness of Gibraltar resided, among many other aspects, in the fact that it was endowed with an annual royal revenue of approximately 1,500,000 maravedíes, for the military expenses of the commandery, provisioning and garrison, which would last until the definitive conquest of the Kingdom of Granada. In 1488 the Catholic Monarchs granted the Duke the Marquisate of Gibraltar, but upon his death in 1492 they tried to recover it for the crown without success, leaving the matter in suspense until 1501, when it was definitively returned. On the other hand, Jimena, which had been conquered from the Nasrids of Granada in 1456, was taken from the Duke of Alburquerque in 1468, which generated a long lawsuit that concluded at the beginning of the 16th century, with the house paying 6,000,000 maravedís as compensation for the town. During this period the house made monetary loans to the Crown for the War of Granada and provided military services in the campaigns of Alhama, Malaga and the Vega de Granada, among others.

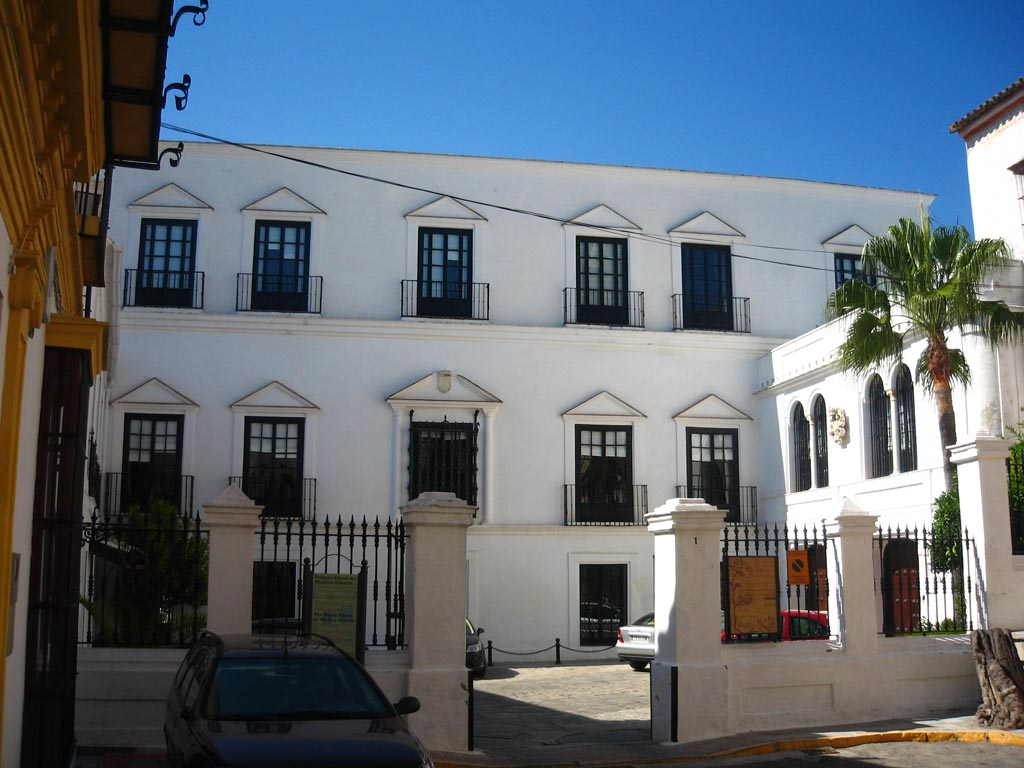
Ducal Palace of Medina Sidonia, ancestral home of the lineage in Sanlúcar de Barrameda.

At the end of 1494 or beginning of 1495, the 3rd Duke lent his support to the Adelantado Alonso Fernández de Lugo, who definitively conquered Tenerife, which brought the house sugar mills and real estate in the Canary Islands. In 1497 an armada commanded by Pedro de Estopiñán departed from Sanlúcar and occupied Melilla, in the kingdom of Tlemcen near the border with the kingdom of Fez. The kings named the Duke governor and lieutenant of Melilla and made a release on his revenues of 4,400,000 maravedies for the military expenses of the place. Melilla was an outpost that would serve as support to the trade that from Sanlúcar was maintained with Maghreb, which, although it was prohibited for religious reasons, was for the ducal treasury more important than the one maintained with the Indies. In 1498 the kings granted the lordship of Gaucín, Benarrabá, Algatocín, Benamaoya (Note: Also called "Benamaya".) and Benhamahabu, (Note: Also called "Benamahabú", a village between Algatocín and Benalauría, today uninhabited.) all of them places in the Serranía de Ronda. In 1503 a new entailed estate of the house was approved and included Huelva, Jimena, San Juan del Puerto, the dozavo de Palos, Olivares and Villafranca.

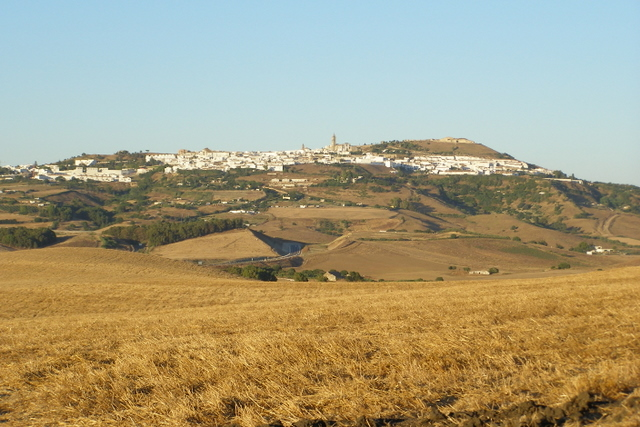
View of Medina Sidonia, the municipality that gives its name to the noble house.

In 1504, the death of Isabella the Catholic and the subsequent accession to the throne of Castile of her daughter Joanna and her husband Philip, who were in Flanders, created a power vacuum that rekindled the expectations of the nobility to recover the power lost during the reign of the queen. In 1505 the 3rd Duke Juan threw himself to offer his support to Joanna and Philip, in front of the "threat" of the queen's father Ferdinand the Catholic, by means of an embassy that left Sanlúcar to Flanders. In response, they named him " Royal Lieutenant and Captain General of the kingdoms of Granada, Cordoba, Jaén, the Algarves, Algeciras, with all Andalusia" and, according to a document, "and of Murcia"; position that never came to be exercised. The house continued relentlessly in the expansion of its domains. In 1506, the ducal governor of Melilla, Gonzalo Mariño de Ribera, conquered Cazaza and the Duke received from the new kings the marquisate of the same name. In addition, according to the chroniclers of the house of the five hundred (Medina and Barrantes), when the kings arrived in Castile, they gave the Duke a new grant of Gibraltar, but this is not documented.

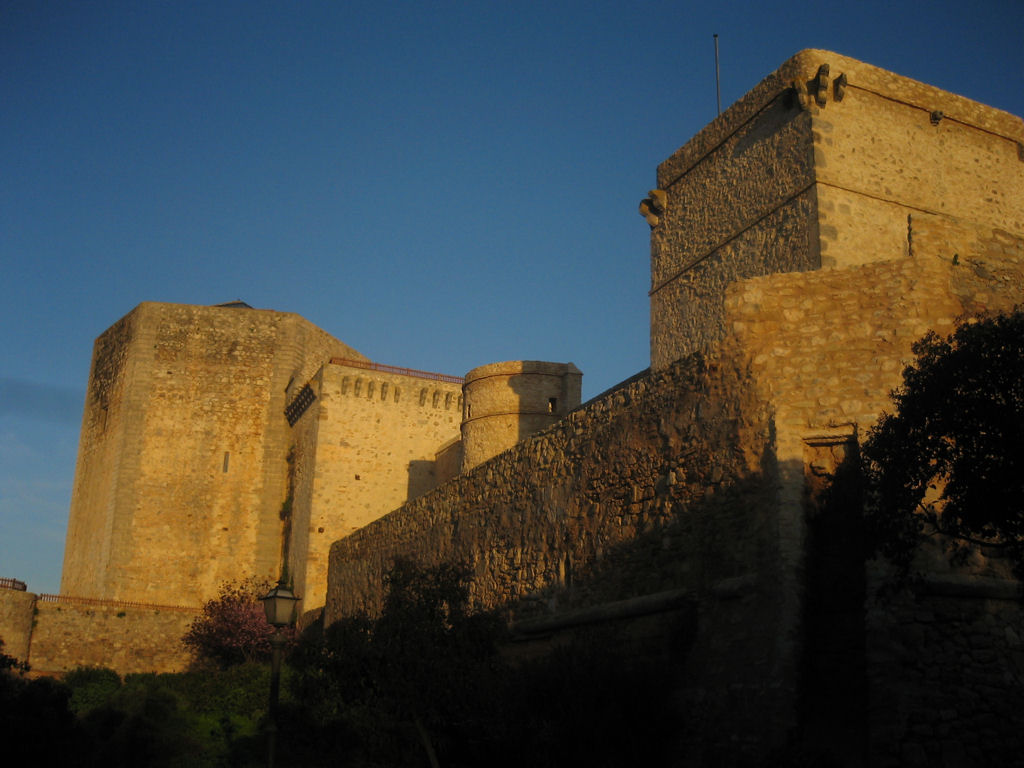
Castle of Santiago de Sanlúcar de Barrameda.

The truth is that Isabella the Catholic had left in her will that Gibraltar would not be alienated anymore, which was not an obstacle for the Duke to try to recover it by force, taking advantage of the new power vacuum after the unexpected death of Philip the Handsome in 1506, since Ferdinand the Catholic was in Naples from where it would take a year to return to Castile. In the middle of 1506 the disturbances of Cordoba against the inquisitor Lucero took place, which provoked the immediate repression from the King in August and the five years banishment of the rebellious Marquis of Priego. The 3rd Duke, for his part, proceeded to the siege of Gibraltar, in front of which his son Enrique was 9 or 10 years old. The siege lasted two months, but the city resisted and the Duke lifted the siege at the end of October. In November 1506, the Andalusian nobles, as well as the Meseteños, filed a lawsuit by which they formed a league or confederation to defend their interests in Andalusia against those of the incoming regent. This league was formed by the Duke of Medina Sidonia himself, the Marquis of Priego Pedro Fernández de Córdoba, the Count of Cabra, the Archbishop of Seville Diego de Deza and the 2nd Count of Urueña (Note: Today, Count of Ureña) Juan Tellez Girón. The Duke made two unsuccessful attempts on Jerez and a second siege of Gibraltar, in May 1507, which was also unsuccessful. In July 1507, the Duke returned to Seville where he died unexpectedly of the plague, and was succeeded as 4th Duke by his son Enrique, a minor. The 4th Duke was left under the guardianship of his stepmother Leonor Pérez de Guzmán y Zúñiga, his brother-in-law Pedro Girón, Per Afán de Ribera, Juan de Barahona and Antón Rodríguez Lucero.

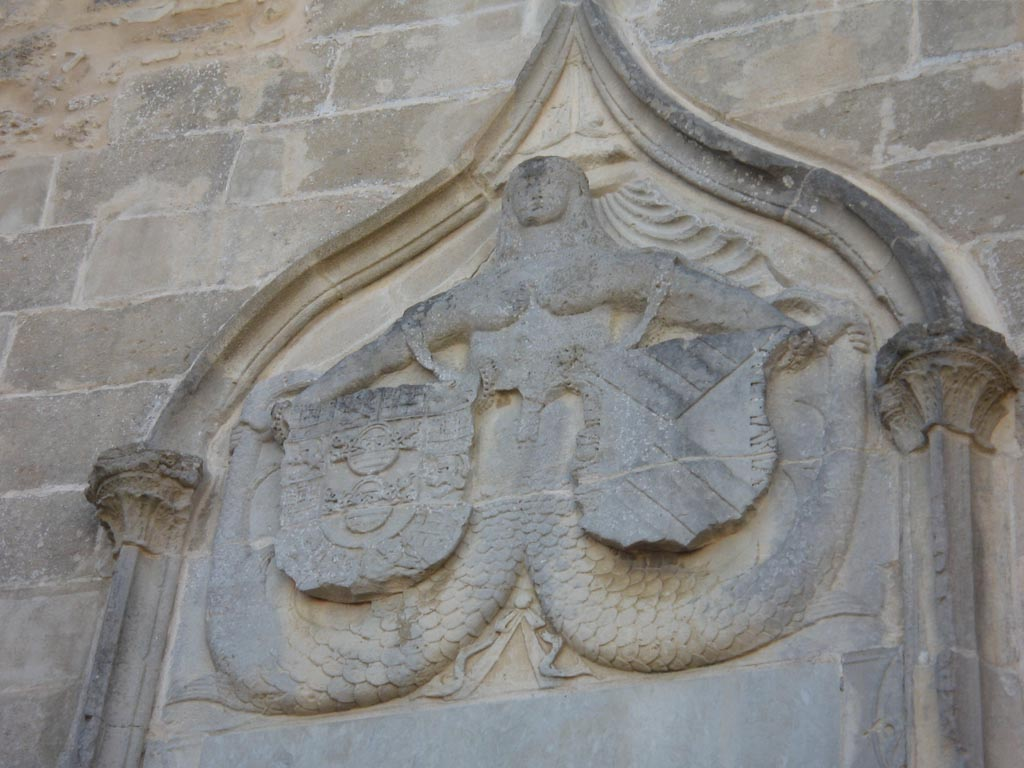
Coats of arms of the Pérez de Guzmán and the House of Mendoza, in the Castle of Santiago of Sanlúcar de Barrameda.

From then on the house went through a series of vicissitudes caused fundamentally by the contracted family alliances, the territorial lawsuits pending resolution and the political instability that the Andalusian nobility was going through before the return of the Catholic King. The 3rd Duke had arranged with Juan Téllez Girón, 2nd Count of Urueña, a double marriage between Guzmans and Girones: Mencía Pérez de Guzmán married Pedro Girón, 3rd Count of Ureña, and the future Duke Enrique would marry María Téllez Girón, also known as María de Archidona, when they reached the appropriate age. With the return of the Catholic King to Castile in mid-1507 to take charge of the regency, the Castilian nobility was once again subjected to the royal power. However, the Andalusian nobility would not do so until mid-1508. The entry into the family of Pedro Girón, tutor of the 4th Duke, who was weak and a minor, meant from the beginning a confrontation with Ferdinand the Catholic. The Aragonese monarch intended to marry his granddaughter Ana of Aragon, daughter of Alfonso, extramarital son of King Ferdinand and Archbishop of Zaragoza, to Duke Enrique. Pedro Girón, opposed to this marriage, lied to the king telling him that the duke and his sister María of Archidona were already married. The monarch, unaware that Girón was lying, expressed his displeasure at this marriage, which had not had royal consent. Girón, cunningly, rushed to take the two children to Medina-Sidonia where he married them secretly.

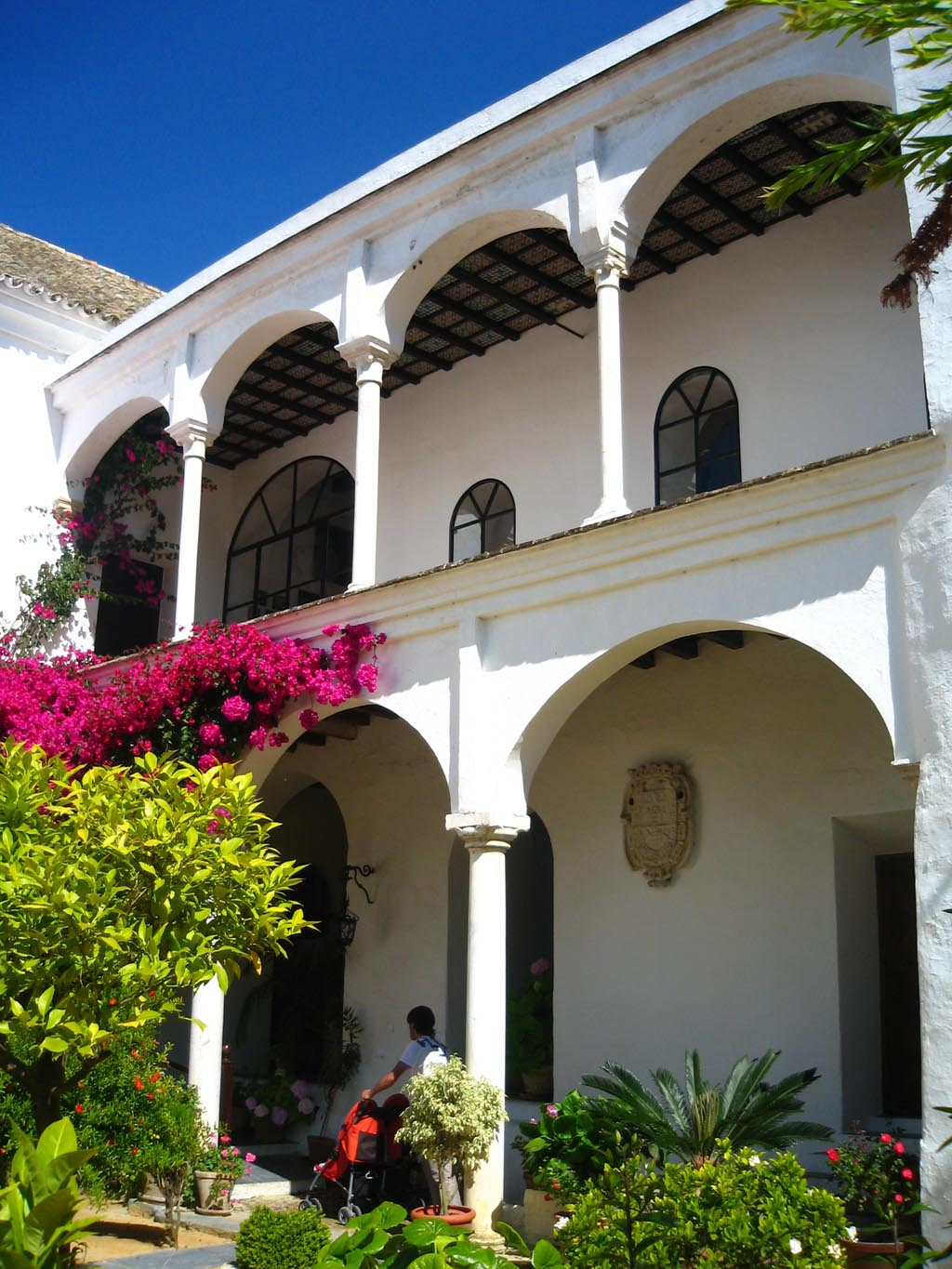
Interior view of the Palace of Medina Sidonia in Sanlúcar.

The king, from Seville, asked Pedro Girón for the fortresses of Sanlúcar, Vejer and Huelva, who replied that he should deal directly with the duke, who was already married and lord of his estates. Such conduct was considered rebellion by the king. Pedro Giron was banished to Portugal, taking with him the child duke as collateral. The king proceeded to take all the villas and fortresses of the duke's estate. Niebla, by orders given by Girón before leaving for exile, resisted the king, so the town suffered the assault of the royal troops in November 1508, which caused a popular massacre remembered for its crudeness. After this, the king did not suppress the ducal estates, but appointed the archbishop of Seville Diego de Deza, Per Afán de Ribera and Dr. Lillo as governor; the suppression of the manor would have confronted him with the entire noble estate. The seizure by the king of the estates of the house left its members in a difficult economic situation. Nevertheless, the king authorized the governors of the lordship to release the amount of money sufficient for the fulfillment of Duke Juan's will and the resolution of the territorial lawsuits, paying 10,000,000 maravedíes to the House of Medinaceli in compensation for Huelva in 1509, and paying 34,000,000 to the Count of Alba de Liste for Ayamonte and Lepe in 1510.

The house and the king ended up ingratiating themselves, and in 1512 the royal pardon arrived. Both the 4th Duke and Pedro Girón returned from Portugal. On their return they accepted the king at court and established their residence in Osuna, where the duke died in January 1513, childless and leaving his sister Mencía de Guzmán (at that time Pedro Girón's wife) as his universal heir. Naturally, the will was contested and Alonso, the legitimate heir, asked for help from the king, who married him in 1513 to his granddaughter Ana of Aragon by proxy, since both were minors. During Alonso's minority, the widowed Duchess Leonor governed the states of the house until her death in 1515. At the end of that year the wedding between Alonso and Ana took place in Plasencia. Alonso was to be considered "mentally ill and impotent" and in 1518, Charles I agreed to transfer the title to his brother Juan Alonso, marrying him to his sister-in-law after the relevant annulment of the previous marriage. The new duke served the Emperor in the War of the Communities of Castile, keeping the kingdom of Seville faithful and placing his brother Pedro, 1st Duke of Olivares, at the head of the Andalusian troops when María Pacheco surrendered in Toledo. Precisely this Pedro de Guzmán inaugurates the House of Olivares, one of the minor branches of the house, which will havemuch prominence in the history of Spain in the figure of the Count-Duke of Olivares.

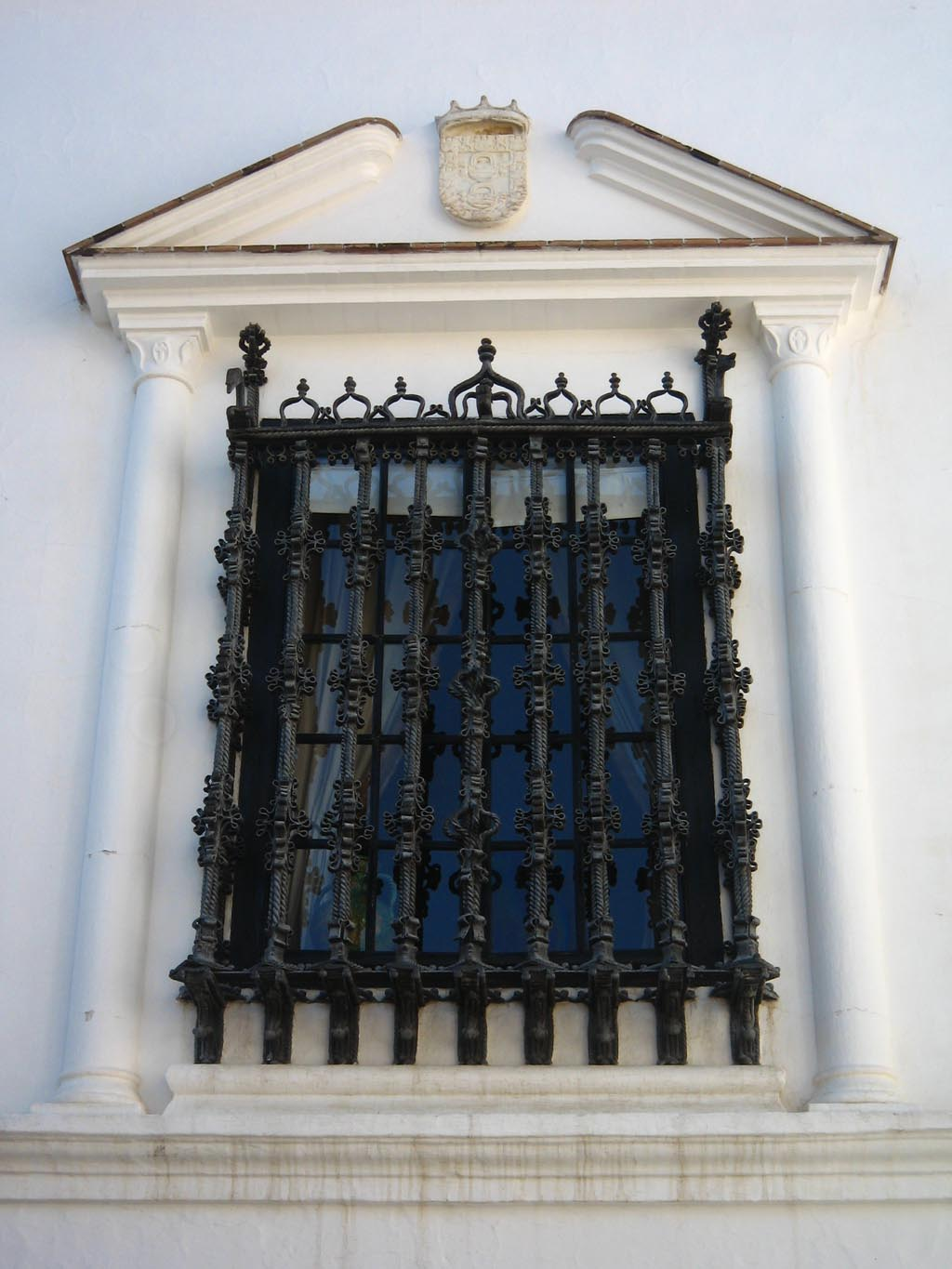
Grille of the Palace of Sanlúcar, from the disappeared Palace of Seville.

=== Captaincy General of the Ocean Sea and Coasts of Andalusia. ===
In 1581 the 7th Duke was invested knight of the Order of the Golden Fleece and named Captain General of Lombardy. The 7th, 8th and 9th Dukes held the Captaincy General of the Ocean Sea and Coasts of Andalusia.

=== Revolt in Andalusia. The Decline ===
The decline of the house began after the Andalusian independentist conspiracy (1641), supposedly led by the 9th Duke, although it was possibly a conspiracy against him orchestrated by the Count-Duke of Olivares, a member of a minor branch of the house. As a consequence, the 9th Duke lost the Lordship of Sanlúcar in 1645, was banished and the Capitanía General de la Mar Océana Sea passed to the House of Medinaceli.

Map of the Kingdom of Seville (1750-54), according to the General Answers of the Cadastre of Ensenada. In green the states of the House of Medina Sidonia in that kingdom. Sanlúcar de Barrameda had already been incorporated into the Crown.

=== From the Pérez de Guzmán to the Álvarez de Toledo: The incorporated houses. ===
Coat of arms of the González de Gregorio family, surname of the current owner of the House.

In 1779 the headship of the House passed to the House of Villafranca del Bierzo, when upon the death without descendants of Pedro de Alcántara Pérez de Guzmán y Pacheco, 14th Duke of Medina Sidonia, it was inherited by his second nephew José Álvarez de Toledo y Gonzaga, 11th Marquis of Villafranca, who also died without descendants, passing the varony of the house to his brother Francisco de Borja Álvarez de Toledo y Gonzaga. This also incorporated the houses of Vélez, Paternò and Martorell.

=== Fundación Casa Medina Sidonia ===
Currently the head of the house is Leoncio Alonso González de Gregorio y Álvarez de Toledo. The 21st Duchess Luisa Isabel Álvarez de Toledo y Maura catalogued the Archivo de la Casa (Archives of the House) and created the Fundación Casa Medina Sidonia (Foundation House Medina Sedonia) in the ducal palace of Sanlúcar de Barrameda. After her death in 2008, the presidency of the foundation passed for life to Liliane Dahlmann, although her children are demanding that the foundation be reformulated, because the assets that their mother donated to it during her lifetime, being the majority of her entire estate, should be reduced to satisfy the rights of her children, should be reduced in order to satisfy the legal rights of the heirs (to pay the heirs their legitimate rights in the proportions established by the Spanish Civil Code), without detriment to the interests of the State and the declaration of Bien de Interés Cultural (with the consequent indivisibility), which affects the inheritance of the 21st Duchess.

Jurisdictional lordships of the House of Medina Sidonia in the Kingdom of Granada, in green.

== Other members ==
Other members of the house had an outstanding role in history, such as the Conde-Duque de Olivares, valide of Philip IV of Spain, and Luisa de Guzmán, queen consort and regent of Portugal. Also in the family there were two Patriarchs of the Indies, Alonso Perez de Guzman, son of the 7th Duke, and Antonio Perez de Guzman, grandson of the 8th Duke. On the other hand, there are historical characters who shared a surname with the Andalusian Guzmans but whose kinship is not proven, such as St. Dominic de Guzmán, who is considered the patron of the house, Pedro Núñez de Guzmán, sometimes mentioned as adelantado mayor of Castile, other times of Andalusia, and supposed father of Guzmán el Bueno, as well as Eleanor de Guzmán, mistress of Alfonso XI of Castile.

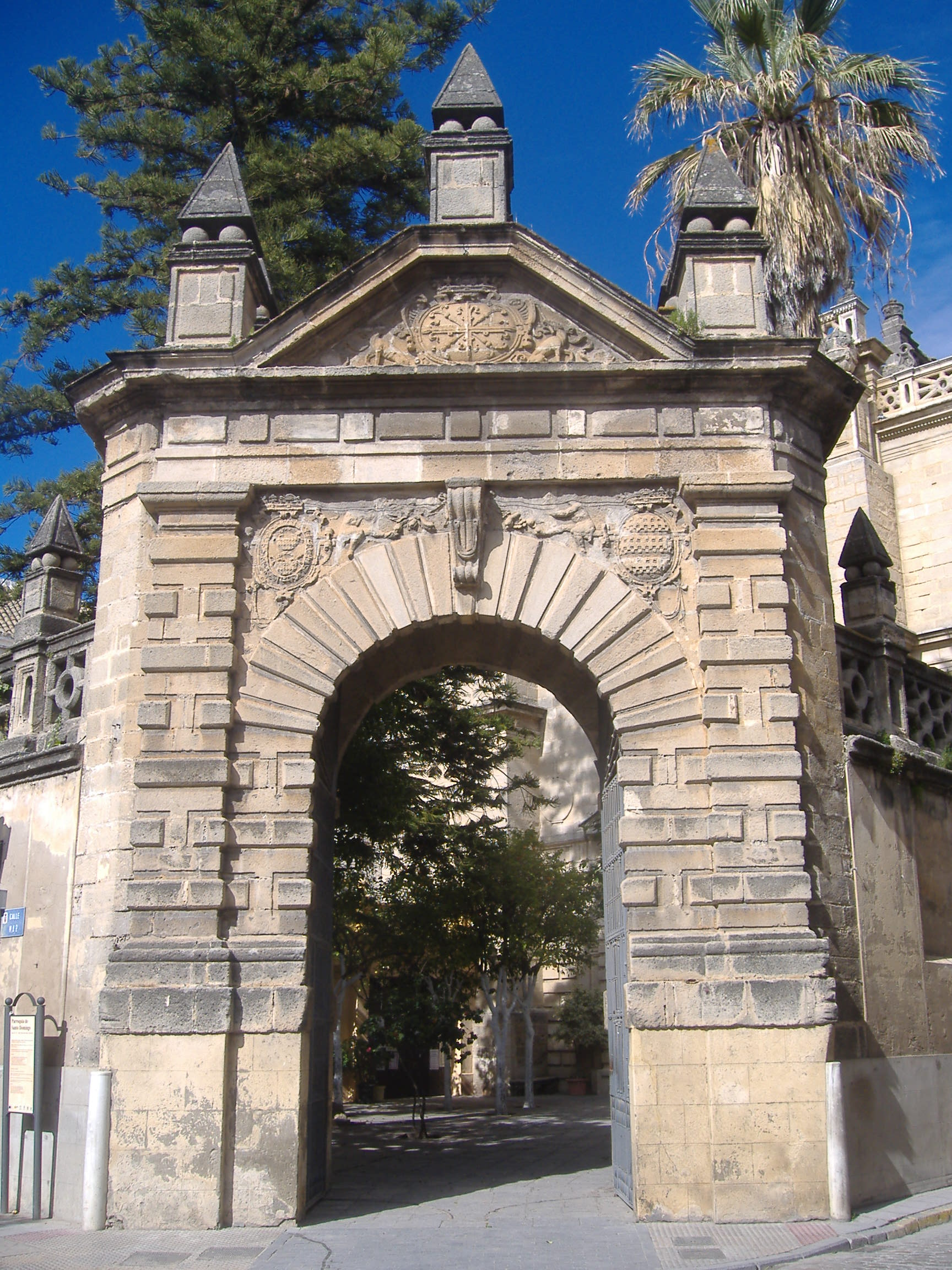
Front of the entrance compass of the Church of Santo Domingo, in Sanlúcar, pantheon of the 9 Counts of Niebla.

== Relationship with other noble houses ==
Throughout its history, the members of the House of Medina Sidonia have been related to numerous lineages and noble houses, among them the House of Medinaceli, the House of Arcos, the Enríquez family (relatives of Henry II of Castile), the House of Alcalá, the House of Ayamonte, the House of Osuna, the House of Braganza, the House of Zúñiga, the House of Aragón, the House of Mendoza, the House of Lerma...

The Dukes of Medina Sidonia have Royal ancestry, because, among many other lines, María Antónia Gonzaga y Caraciolo, mother of the 16th Duke of Medina Sidonia, Francisco de Borja Álvarez de Toledo y Gonzaga, descended, through the House of Este, from Catalina Micaela, married to Charles Emmanuel I, daughter of Philip II.

Coat of arms of the Pérez de Guzmán family, bordered with the castles and lions of the royal family, with which he was connected.

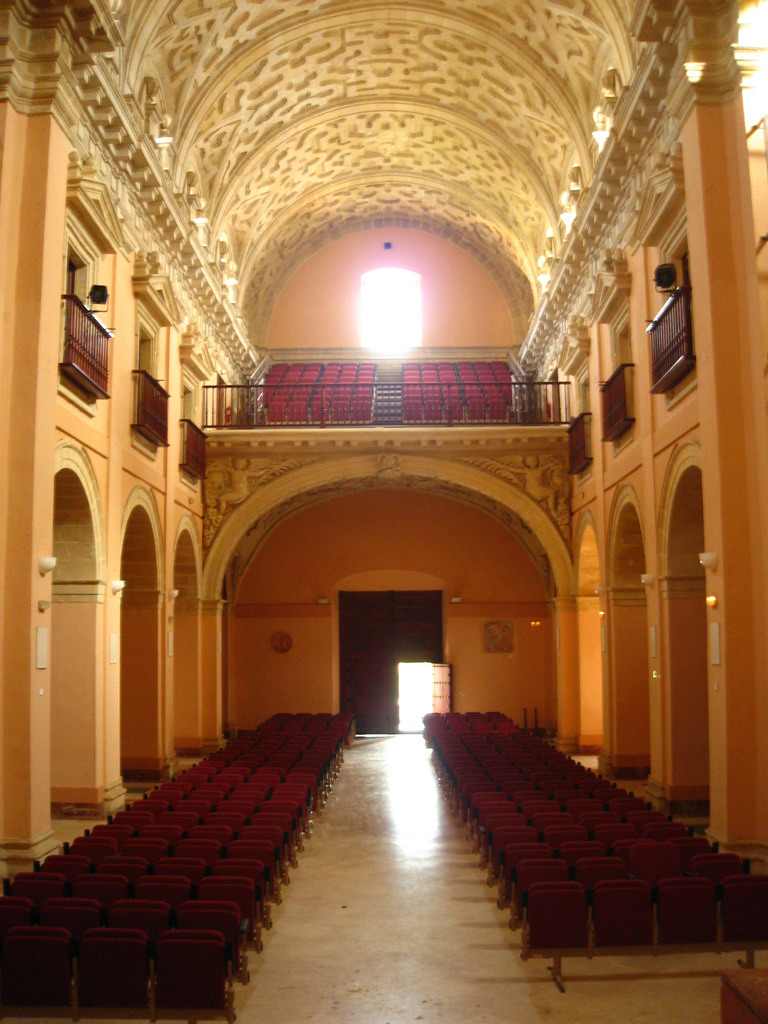
Interior of the Church of La Merced, pantheon of the 8 Dukes of Medina Sidonia.

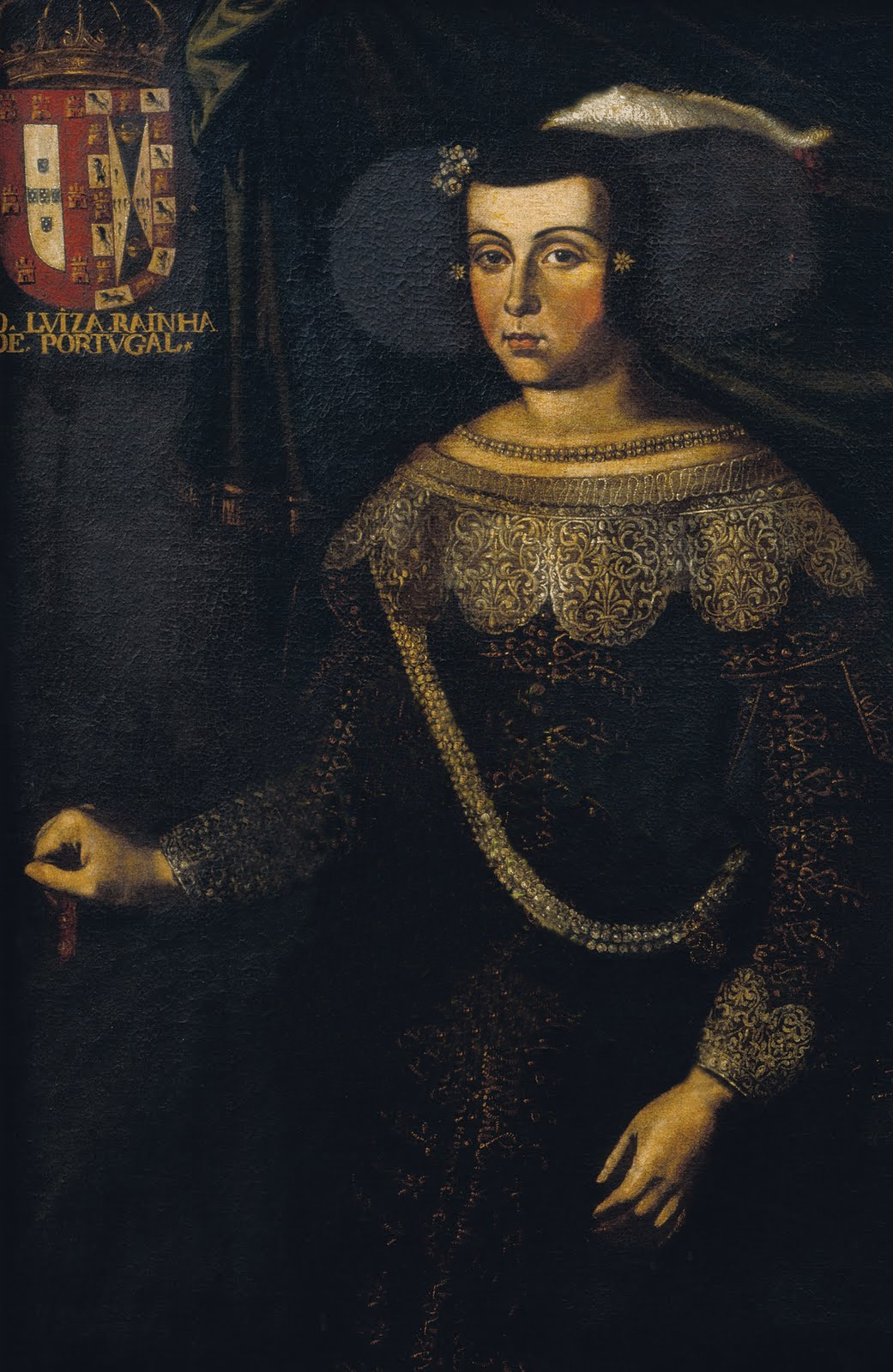
Luisa de Guzmán, queen consort and regent of Portugal.

== Royal Ancestry ==
Charles V Emperor; Holy Roman Empire
Philip II; King of Spain
Catalina Micaela of Austria; Infanta of Spain
Isabella of Savoy; Princess of Savoy
Anna Beatrice d'Este; Princess of Módena
Laura Pico della Mirandola; Princess of Castiglione
Francesco Gonzaga; Duke of Solferino
María Antonia Gonzaga y Caracciolo; Marquise of Villafranca del Bierzo
Francisco de Borja Álvarez de Toledo y Gonzaga; 16th Duke of Medina Sedonia
Pedro de Alcántara Álvarez de Toledo; 17th Duke of Medina Sedonia
José Joaquín Álvarez de Toledo; 18th Duke of Medina Sidonia
José Joaquín Álvarez de Toledo; 19th Duke of Medina Sidonia
Joaquín Álvarez de Toledo; 20th Duke of Medina Sidonia
Luisa Isabel Álvarez de Toledo; 21st Duchess of Medina Sidonia
Leoncio Alonso González de Gregorio y Álvarez de Toledo; 22nd Duke of Medina Sidonia

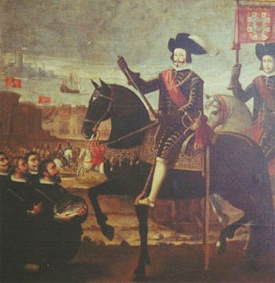
Gaspar Pérez de Guzmán y Sandoval, 9th Duke of Medina Sidonia.

== Economy of the house ==
The economy of the house was based fundamentally on agriculture, livestock, fishing and trade. It cultivated in its lands of the Aljarafe, of the Lower Guadalquivir, of the Campiña de Jerez and of the alfoz of Medina Sidonia, the Mediterranean triad (wheat, olive tree and vineyard) and the horticultural crops. From the point of view of cattle farming, it exploited the large pastures of the County of Niebla and Andévalo. It owned the tuna traps of Barbate, Conil and Chiclana, the salt mines and the Almona de Sanlúcar. It traded from the port of Sanlúcar with Northern Europe, North Africa and the Indies, exporting tuna, wine, grana, oil, soap... and benefiting from the imports and all the commercial traffic of said port, through the ducal contracting house and the collection of the almojarifazgo of the port of Sanlúcar by the ducal customs.

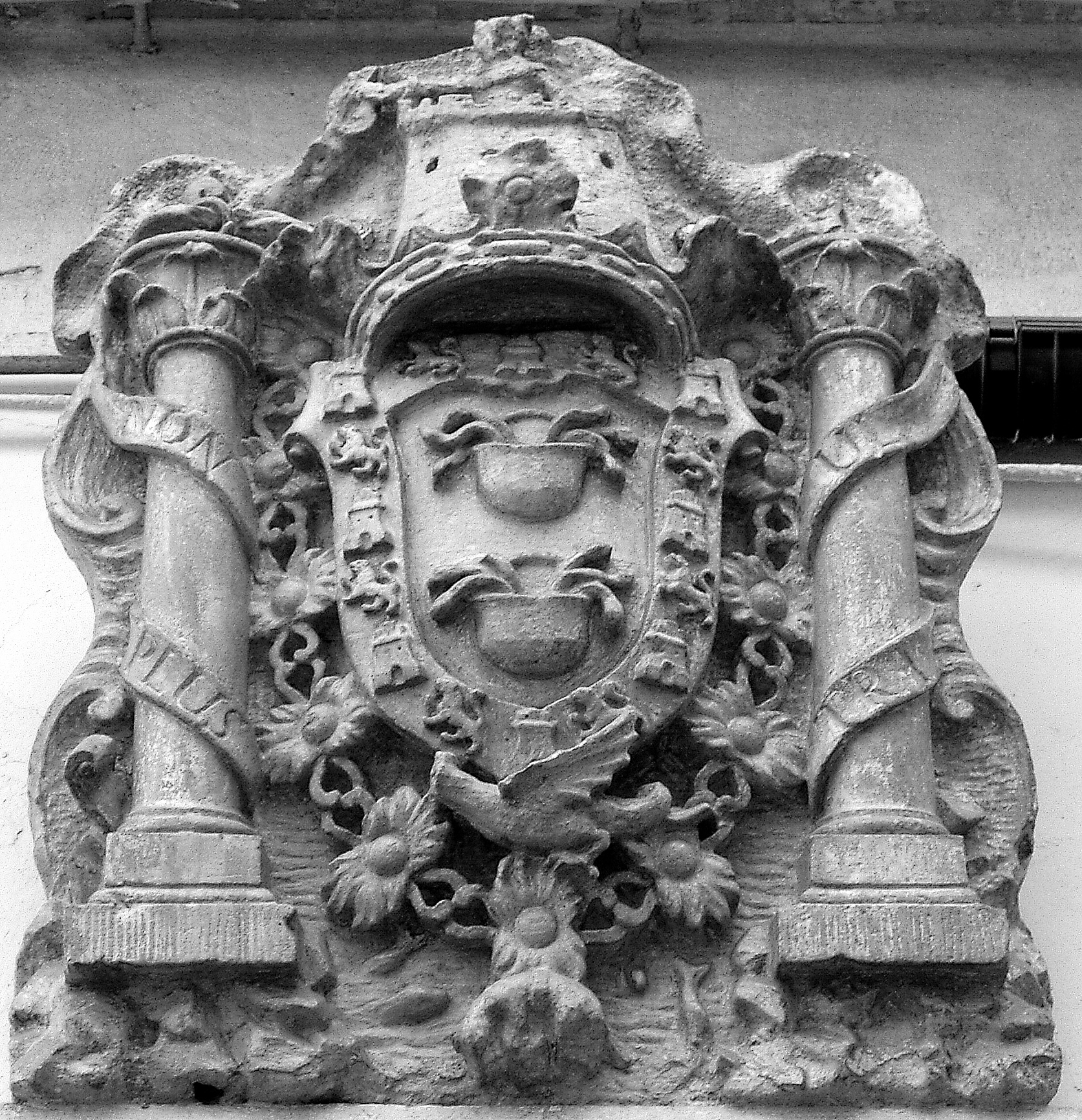
Coat of arms of the House of Medina Sidonia, in Palacio Street, Huelva, former residence of the married Counts of Niebla.

== Artistic patronage and presence in the arts ==
The house exercised an important artistic patronage. Examples of this, in the architectural field, are the Palace of Medina Sidonia in Sanlúcar de Barrameda, the Palace of the Counts in the city of Huelva, the Palace of Medina Sidonia in Seville (now demolished) the Monastery of San Isidoro del Campo in Santiponce, the Monastery of Dominicas de Madre de Dios in Sanlúcar, the Convent of Santo Domingo in Sanlúcar, the Sanctuary of Nuestra Señora de la Caridad Coronada in Sanlúcar, the Convent of La Merced in Sanlúcar, the Castle of Santiago, the Castles of Niebla, Trigueros and Barbate, the Castle of Zahara de los Atunes and Palace of Jadraza and a long etcetera. As for painting and sculpture, the works commissioned to Francisco Juanete and Francisco de la Gándara stand out. Likewise, the works of silverware by Luis Sánchez and Jacques de Uparque, and the sons of the latter Juan and Pedro. In the literatio, the Tarifa exploit of Guzmán el Bueno has been the subject of numerous works, among them the one written by Tomás de Iriarte. Attributed to Cervantes, the Soneto a la entrada del duque de Medina en Cádiz, is dedicated to the 7th Duke. Góngora dedicated his Fábula de Polifemo y Galatea to the Count of Niebla.

== Bibliography ==
- Álvarez de Toledo y Maura, Isabel. "XXI Duquesa de Medina Sidonia". Web de la Fundación Casa de Medina Sidonia. (in Spanish).
- Barrantes Maldonado, Pedro. "Ilustraciones de la Casa de Niebla" Manuscript in the Biblioteca Capitular y Colombina of Seville (1541). Edition by de Gayangos, Pascual. Volumes 9 and 10 of the Spanish Historical Memorial Collection of the Real Academia de la Historia. Imprenta Nacional, Madrid. 1857. Edition by Devis Marquez, Federico. Colección Fuentes para la Historia de Cádiz y su Provincia no. 3 of the University of Cádiz. 1998. ISBN 84-7786-506-X
- Galán Parra, Isabel (1988). "El linaje y los estados señoriales de los duques de Medina Sidonia a comienzos del siglo XVI" (PDF). En la España medieval (in Spanish) (11). Madrid: Universidad Complutense: 45–78. ISSN 0214-3038. Archived from the original (PDF) on 2011-05-14.
- de Medina, Pedro (1932) [1561]. Crónica de los Duques de Medina Sidonia por el Maestro Pedro de Medina (Manuscript of 1561 in the Archives of the Ducal House of Medinasidonia leg. 1316.) (in Spanish). Colección de Documentos Inéditos para la Historia de España no. XXXIX.
