= Marquis of Molina =

Castilian noble title

Marquis of Molina Marqués de Molina

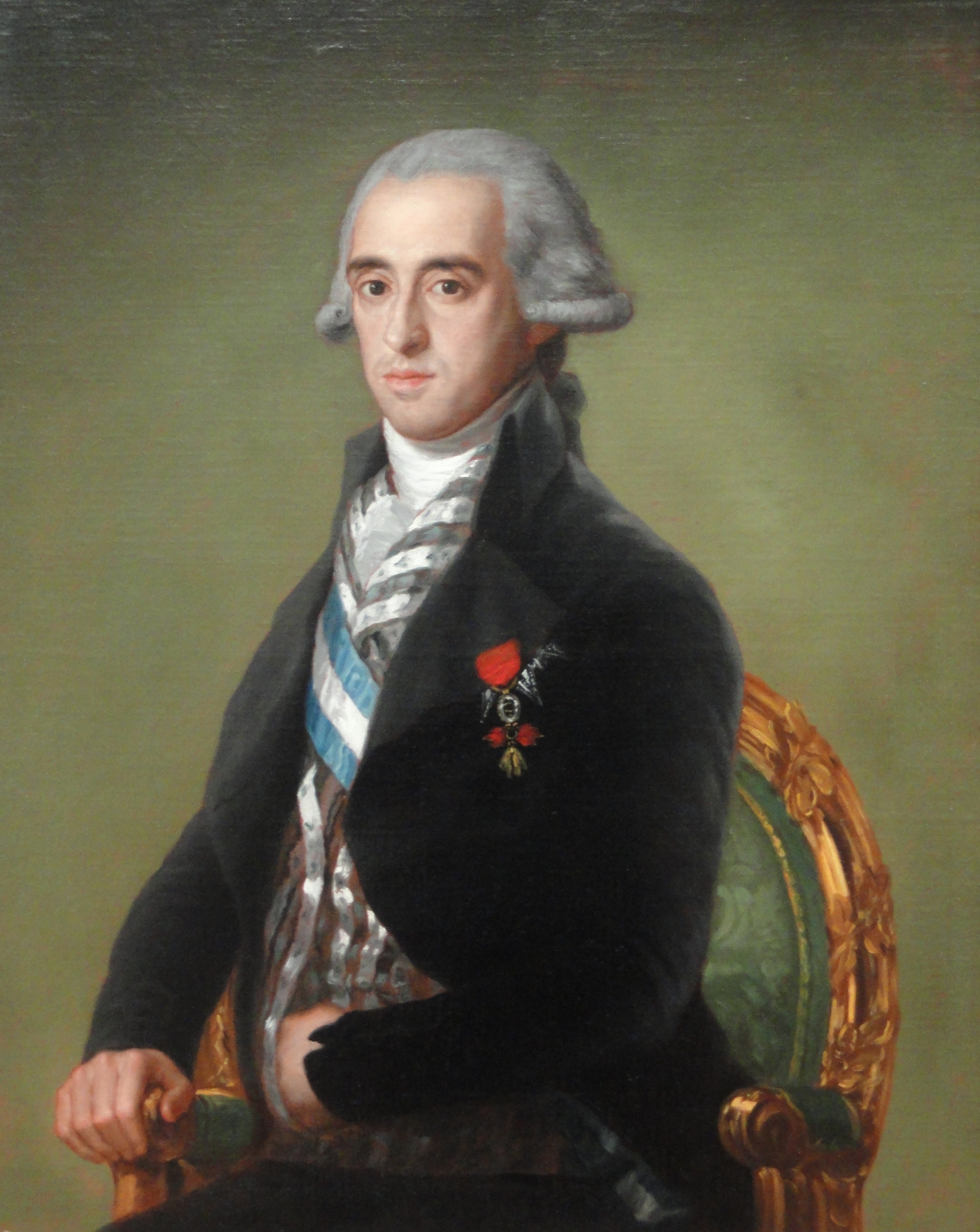
- José María Álvarez de Toledo, 10th Marquis of Molina (1756-1796)
- Parent family: House of Fajardo, House of Toledo
- Country: Spain
- Founded: 16 August 1535 by Charles I of Spain
- Founder: Luis Fajardo, 2nd Marquis of los Vélez
- Current head: Miguel Márquez y Osorio

Marquis of Molina is a Castilian noble title that the Charles V, Holy Roman Emperor granted to the heirs to the Marquis of Los Vélez. (Note: This privilege came with promotion to Grandee of Spain for the Marquesate of los Vélez. Traditionally, the heirs of a house belonging to the elite of the Castilian nobility had to hold a noble title from birth until their parent transmitted to them the leadership of the lineage.) The title was given to Luis Fajardo, 2nd Marquis of los Vélez. For centuries "Marquis de Molina" was the courtesy title of the apparent heir of the Marquis de los Vélez.

The grant did not bring new fiefs to the family, since it was just an elevation of the rank of the Lordship of Molina de Segura, owned by the Fajardo family since 1387. (Note: The town of Molina de Segura was one of the first possessions of the Fajardo in Murcia. King Henry III of Castile granted it to Alfonso Yánez Fajardo, considered the founder of the House of Fajardo.) Members of this Murcian family held the title until 1713. In 1779, after various marriage alliances, (Note: After the extinction of the house of Fajardo, its inheritance passed to the Sicilian Dukes of Montalto, and subsequently to the House of Villafranca del Bierzo, a branch of the powerful lineage of the Álvarez de Toledo) it entered the House of Medina Sidonia.

At present, as recognized by the Ministry of Justice of Spain, the legitimate title holder is Miguel Márquez y Osorio, (Note: Royal Succession Letter of 1952 in favor of his father, José Joaquín Márquez and Álvarez de Toledo. In 1978, there was an assignment on the rights of the title to his son, of which there is no record on the Internet due to the gap in the online BOE archives between 1967 and 1995.) 5th Duke of Santa Cristina and descendant of José Joaquín Álvarez de Toledo, 19th Duke of Medina Sidonia.

== History ==
The House traces its origins to the Kingdom of Galicia, as the genealogist Felipe de la Gándara points out: "Faxardo traces its origin to King Fruela I of Asturias, and from his son Count don Román, such as the Lugos, Bahamondes, Montenegros, Gayosos and others of Galicia", having its original base in the town of Santa Marta de Ortigueira. Although the family's birthright was based in Galicia, the Marquises de los Vélez are considered to be heads of the Fajardo since they are Grandees of Spain.

There is little historical significance to this marquessate, since it was one of many titles inherited by the primogeniture of the House of Fajardo, whose leaders were Marquises of Vélez. However, as long as they were heirs to their House, all their political and military actions would be associated with the Marquisate of Molina. After the abolition of the señoríos, the privilege of the title established by Carlos V was not taken into account, so the second children of the House were given it in turn.

This was the situation until 1693, when the death without offspring of the 6th Marquis de los Vélez, also Marquis de Molina, caused the extinction of the male line of the Fajardo de Murcia. The succession of the estate of Vélez fell to María Teresa Fajardo, Duchess consort of Montalto, who added the Marquisate to a house possessing vast estates and an immense conglomerate of noble titles. This was a branch of the powerful Catalan House of Montcada lineage, based in Sicily since the reign of Ferdinand I of Aragon. Over time, they became one of the most important families in the Kingdom and accumulated numerous possessions, such as the rich villas of Biancavilla, Melilli, Caltabellotta, Bivona and Adrano. Their influence earned them the rank of grandees of Spain and peers of the Kingdom of Sicily, along with leading government and military positions.

In 1713 Fadrique Álvarez de Toledo inherited the titles of Montalto and Vélez from his mother, the 8th Marquise de los Vélez. He added them to his titles of Marquis de Villafranca, Duke of Fernandina, Marquis of Villanueva de Valdueza and Prince of Montalbán. In 1779 the dukedom of Medina Sidonia was inherited by José Álvarez de Toledo, Duke of Alba, 11th Marquis of Villafranca, which, being one of the twenty-five lineages that possessed "Immemorial Greatness", (Note: In 1520, King Charles I of Spain was crowned in Aachen as Holy Roman Emperor, and granted the Castilian high nobility a distinction that matched the rank of princes of the Empire: the Grandees of Spain. Henceforth, this restricted group of families could boast of having precedence over other nobles of the Kingdom by possessing the so-called "Immemorial Greatness".) held a higher rank than the other estates in possession of the Marquis. This meant that Count of Niebla, along with Duke of Fernandina as used by the heirs to the House of Villafranca, were the titles of the firstborn.

When the title of Marquis was supplanted in its original function, throughout the nineteenth century the title was granted to second sons of the House. Lack of offspring prevented succession of the title in these younger branches, so it remained in the main branch of the family until the 20th century

== Lords of Molina Seca ==
1. Alfonso Yánez Fajardo, 1st señor de Molina
2. Juan Alfonso Fajardo, 2nd señor de Molina
3. Pedro Fajardo y Quesada, 3rd señor de Molina
4. Luisa Fajardo y Manrique de Lara, 4th señora de Molina
5. Pedro Fajardo, 1st Marquis of los Vélez (c. 1478–1546)

== Marquesses of Molina ==
1. Luis Fajardo, 2nd Marquis of los Vélez (1509–1575), 1st Marquis de Molina
2. Pedro Fajardo y Fernández de Córdoba, 2nd Marquis of Molina, 3rd Marquis of los Vélez
3. Luis Fajardo y Requeséns (1576–1631), 3rd Marquis of Molina, 4th Marquis of los Vélez
4. Pedro III Fajardo, 5th Marquis of Los Vélez (1602–47), 4th Marquis of Molina
5. Fernando Fajardo y Álvarez de Toledo (1635–93), 5th Marquis of Molina y VI Marquis of los Vélez
6. María Teresa Fajardo y Álvarez de Toledo (1645-1715), 6th Marchioness of Molina, 7th Marchioness of los Vélez
7. Catalina Moncada de Aragón y Fajardo (1665–1727), 7th Marchioness of Molina, 9th Duchess do Montalto
8. Fadrique Vicente de Toledo Osorio (1686–1753), 8th Marquis of Molina, 9th Marquis of Villafranca
9. Antonio Álvarez de Toledo Osorio (1716–73), 9th Marquis of Molina, 10th Marquis of Villafranca
10. José Álvarez de Toledo, Duke of Alba (1756–96), 10th Marquis of Molina, 15th Duke of Medina Sidonia
11. Francisco de Borja Álvarez de Toledo Osorio (1763–1821), 11th Marquis of Molina, 16th Duke of Medina Sidonia
12. Pedro de Alcántara Álvarez de Toledo, 13th Marquis of Villafranca (1803–67), 12th Marquis of Molina, 17th Duke of Medina Sidonia
13. José Joaquín Álvarez de Toledo, 18th Duke of Medina Sidonia, 13th Marquis of Molina (1826–1900)
14. José Álvarez de Toledo y Caro, (d. 1880)
15. Joaquín Álvarez de Toledo y Caro (1865-1915), 14th Marquis of Molina, 19th Duke of Medina Sidonia.
16. Ildefonso Álvarez de Toledo y Caro, 15th Marquis of Molina
17. José Márquez y Álvarez de Toledo, 16th Marquis of Molina, 4th Duke of Santa Cristina.
18. Miguel Márquez y Osorio, 17th Marquis of Molina, 5th Duke of Santa Cristina.

== See also ==
- Duke of Medina Sidonia

== Sources ==
- Berni y Catalá, José (1796), Creación, antigüedad y privilegios de los títulos de Castilla, Imprenta del autor
- COBOS DE BELCHITE, Julio de Atienza, Barón de: Nobiliario español: Diccionario heráldico de apellidos españoles y títulos nobiliarios Aguilar, 1954.
- De los Reyes, Antonio (1996), El Señorío de Molina Seca, Ayuntamiento de Molina de Segura, ISBN 84-88996-02-0
- Salazar y Castro, Luis de (1995), Árboles de costados de las primeras Casas de estos Reynos, Wilsen, ISBN 84-85918-81-9
- MARAÑÓN, Gregorio: Los tres Vélez: una historia de todos los tiempos. Instituto de Estudios Almerienses, 2005. ISBN 84-8108-324-0
