= Marquis of Los Vélez =

Spanish noble title

Marquis of Los Vélez is a Spanish noble title awarded in 1507 to the Spanish military Fajardo family.

== Marquisate ==
The marquisate was awarded on 15 October 1507 by Queen Joanna I of Castile. The awarded title of Grandee of Spain was given to the Fajardo family in 1520 by her eldest son, King Charles I of Spain.

The first to hold the title was Pedro Fajardo, the first son of Luisa Fajardo y Manrique who, in 1477, had married a powerful Royal accountant and financier named Juan Chacón, a new nobleman jure uxoris. Luisa Fajardo y Manrique, Lady of Cartagena, came from an important military family, with institutional powers over conquered Muslim lands in Murcia, Granada and Almeria. Chacón was allowed by the Catholic Monarchs to use, as a privilege, his family name as Pedro Fajardo y Chacón.

== List of marquises of Los Vélez ==
The current Marquis is also known as Count of Niebla, Marquis of Villafranca del Bierzo (with Grandeza).

| | Titular | Period | Remarks |
|---|---|---|---|
| 1st Marquis of Los Vélez | Pedro I Fajardo | 1507-1542 | son of Juan Chacón and Luisa Fajardo |
| 2nd Marquis of Los Vélez | Luiz I Fajardo | 1542-1575 | |
| 3rd Marquis of Los Vélez | Pedro II Fajardo | 1575-1579 | |
| 4th Marquis of Los Vélez | Luiz II Fajardo | 1579-1631 | |
| 5th Marquis of Los Vélez | Pedro III Fajardo | 1631-1647 | |
| 6th Marquis of Los Vélez | Fernando Joaquín Fajardo | 1647-1693 | |
| 7th Marchioness of Los Vélez | María Teresa Fajardo y Álvarez de Toledo | 1693-1715 | |
| 8th Marchioness of Los Vélez | Catalina Moncada de Aragón y Fajardo | 1715-1727 | 9th Duchess of Montalto |
| 9th Marquis of Los Vélez | Fadrique Álvarez de Toledo y Aragón | 1727-1753 | 9th Marquis of Villafranca |
| 10th Marquis of Los Vélez | Antonio Álvarez de Toledo y Pérez de Guzmán | 1753-1773 | 10th Marquis of Villafranca |
| 11th Marquis of Los Vélez | José Álvarez de Toledo, Duke of Alba | 1773-1796 | 15th Duke of Medina Sidonia; 11th Duke of Montalto; 10th Duke of Bivona; 8th Duke of Fernandina |
| 12th Marquis of Los Vélez | Francisco de Borja Álvarez de Toledo | 1796-1821 | 16th Duke of Medina Sidonia |
| 13th Marquis of Los Vélez | Pedro de Alcántara Álvarez de Toledo y Palafox | 1821-1867 | 17th Duke of Medina Sidonia |
| 14th Marquis of Los Vélez | José Joaquín Álvarez de Toledo | 1864-1892 | 18th Duke of Medina Sidonia |
| 15th Marquis of Los Vélez | Alonso Álvarez de Toledo y Caro | 1892-1897 | |
| 16th Marquis of Los Vélez | José Joaquín Álvarez de Toledo | 1901-1915 | 19th Duke of Medina Sidonia |
| 17th Marquis of Los Vélez | Joaquín Álvarez de Toledo | 1915-1948 | 20th Duke of Medina Sidonia |
| 18th Marquis of Los Vélez | Luisa Isabel Álvarez de Toledo | 1948-2008 | 21st Duchess of Medina Sidonia |
| 19th Marquis of Los Vélez | Leoncio Alonso González de Gregorio | 2010- | 22nd Duke of Medina Sidonia |

== See also ==
- Vélez (name)
