= Pilar González de Gregorio =

The Most Illustrious Pilar González de Gregorio
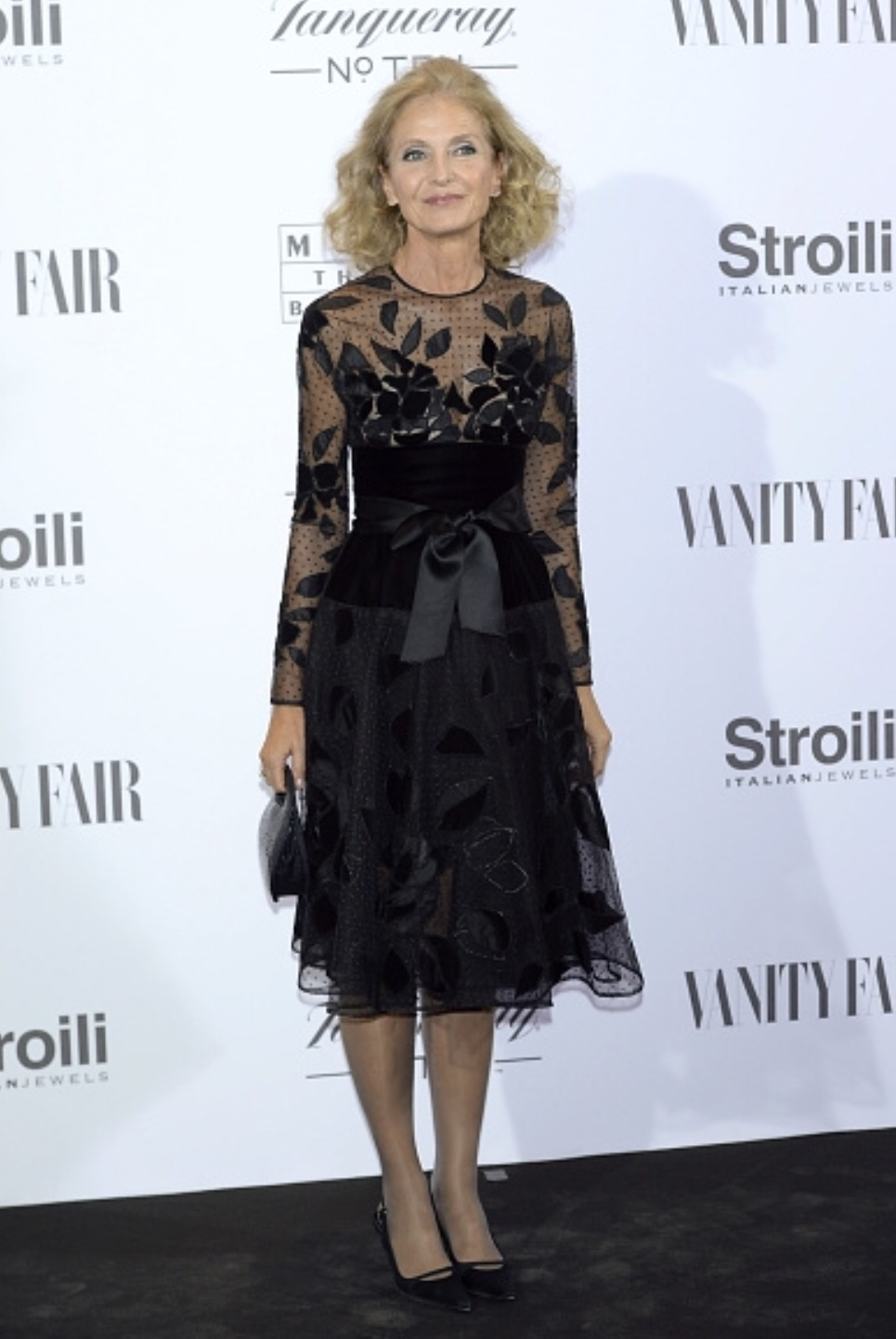
- The ex-Duchess at the Hubert Givenchy exhibition opening in the Museo del Prado, 2014

Personal details
- Born: María del Pilar González de Gregorio y Álvarez de Toledo; 10 January 1957 Madrid, Spain
- Spouses: Rafael Márquez (m. 1977; div. 1981): Tomás María Terry y Merello
- Children: José Márquez y González de Gregorio; Tomás Terry y González de Gregorio
- Parents: Leoncio González de Gregorio y Martí; Luisa Isabel Álvarez de Toledo, 21st Duchess of Medina Sidonia

María del Pilar González de Gregorio y Álvarez de Toledo (born 10 January 1957), also known as Pilar Medina Sidonia, is a Spanish noblewoman, writer and socialite, who had been the former 15th Duchess of Fernandina between 1993 and 2012, until her title was revoked as a result of a legal battle with her nephew. Born in Madrid, she is the daughter of Leoncio González de Gregorio y Martí and his wife Luisa Isabel Álvarez de Toledo, 21st Duchess of Medina Sidonia. Her main seat of residence is at González de Gregorio Palace, in Quintana Redonda, Soria. Pilar is a writer and is the author of many articles and a novel, titled Nápoles 23. Since 2011, Pilar has served as chairman of Christie's Spain.

== Family ==
She married, firstly, her second cousin, Rafael Márquez, 9th Count of las Torres de Alcorrín, second son of General José Joaquín Márquez y Álvarez de Toledo, 4th Duke of Santa Cristina, and María del Rosario Osorio y Díez de Rivera, 8th Countess of las Torres de Alcorrín, of the Ducal House of Alburquerque, on 16 September 1977, and divorced in 1981. She has one child from this marriage:

- Don José Márquez y González de Gregorio (b. 12 July 1978), who married at the Church of Santa Barbara, Madrid on 30 April 2010, Countess Edina Melanie Marie Zichy, granddaughter of amateur tennis player Count Imre Zichy.

She married, secondly, Tomás María Terry y Merello, the second son of Fernando Carlos Terry y del Cuvillo, a sherry producer from El Puerto de Santa María, of Irish descent, relative of the Cuban magnate Tomás Terry y Adán and of Blessed William Tirry, and had a second son:

- Don Tomás Terry y González de Gregorio (b. 6 August 1991).

== Ancestry ==
Ancestors of Pilar González de Gregorio

8. Leoncio González de Gregorio y Martínez de Azagra
4. Leoncio González de Gregorio y Arribas
9. María de la Concepción de Arribas y Turull
2. Leoncio González de Gregorio y Martí
10. Ernesto Martí y Saccone
5. María Leticia Martí y Rodríguez de Castro
11. Isabel Rodríguez de Castro y Bueno
1. Pilar González de Gregorio, 13th Duchess of Fernandina
12. José Joaquín Álvarez de Toledo, 19th Duke of Medina Sidonia
6. Joaquín Álvarez de Toledo, 20th Duke of Medina Sidonia
13. Rosalía Caro y Caro
3. Luisa Isabel Álvarez de Toledo, 21st Duchess of Medina Sidonia
14. Gabriel Maura, 1st Duke of Maura
7. María del Carmen Maura y Herrera
15. Julia de Herrera, 5th Countess of la Mortera

== Titles, styles and honours ==
=== Titles and styles ===
The Dukedom of Fernandina was rehabilitated by King Juan Carlos I of Spain in 1993, by which it was agreed that Pilar would receive the title. Her elder brother, Leoncio Alonso González de Gregorio, 22nd Duke of Medina Sidonia, and his eldest son, Don Alonso Enrique González de Gregorio y Viñamata, won a legal battle in order to strip her of her ducal title. The rehabilitation of the title was formally revoked in 2012.

- 10 January 1957 – 16 September 1977: The Most Illustrious Doña Pilar González de Gregorio y Álvarez de Toledo
- 16 September 1977 – 1981: The Most Excellent The Countess of las Torres de Alcorrín
- 1981 – 1 February 1993: The Most Illustrious Doña Pilar González de Gregorio y Álvarez de Toledo
- 1 February 1993 – 15 June 2012: The Most Excellent The Duchess of Fernandina
- 15 June 2012 – present: The Most Illustrious Doña Pilar González de Gregorio y Álvarez de Toledo

=== Honours ===
- Dame 3rd Class of the Order of the Star of Italian Solidarity (Italy, 26 July 2004)
- Dame of the Real Maestranza de Zaragoza (Spain)

== Sources ==
- www.geneall.net
- Arias, María, Pilar González de Gregorio, Duquesa de Fernandina: "Nápoles 23" at Promociones literarios de María Arias, 27 May 2002. (in Spanish)
- Beltrán, J. Interview to the Duchess of Fernandina, at La Razón, 26 March 2010. (in Spanish)
- Torrijos, Paloma, The González de Gregorio Palace at Quintana Redonda at Blog de Paloma Torrijos, 23 September 2009. (in Spanish)
- Boda de José Márquez y González de Gregorio y Edina Zichy Sánchez-Arjona at Hola.com, 1 May 2010. (in Spanish)
- Elenco de Grandezas y Títulos Nobiliarios Españoles, Hidalguía Editions, 2008

Spanish nobility
Dormant Title last held by José Joaquín Álvarez de Toledo	Duchess of Fernandina; 1 February 1993 – 15 June 2012	Forfeited
