= Duke of Montalto (defunct) =

Dukedom of Spain

Dukedom of Montalto
- Creation date: 27 May 1507
- Created by: Ferdinand II
- Peerage: Peerage of Spain
- First holder: Fernando de Aragón y Guardato, 1st Duke of Montalto
- Last holder: Joaquin Alvarez de Toledo y Caro, 17th Duke of Montalto
- Extinction date: 1955

Duke of Montalto (Spanish: Duque de Montalto) was a hereditary title in the Peerage of Spain, accompanied by the dignity of Grandee and granted in 1507 by Ferdinand II to his nephew Fernando de Aragón y Guardato, who was an illegitimate son of Ferdinand I of Naples.

In 1958, Luisa Isabel Álvarez de Toledo, 21st Duchess of Medina Sidonia, daughter of the last Duke, requested the rehabilitation of the Dukedom with the denomination of "Montalto de Aragón", so to differentiate it from the existing Dukedom of Montalto also granted in 1507 by Ferdinand II. The Francoist Government did not accept this request for unknown reasons, and so the title became extinct.

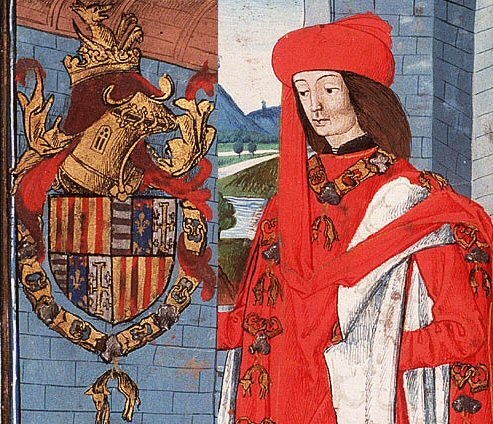
Miniature showing Ferdinand I of Naples, father of the 1st Duke of Montalto, wearing the robes of the Order of the Golden Fleece

== Dukes of Montalto (1507) ==
- Fernando de Aragón y Guardato, 1st Duke of Montalto
- Antonio de Aragón y Cardona, 2nd Duke of Montalto
- Pedro de Aragón y Cardona, 3rd Duke of Montalto
- Antonio de Aragón y Cardona, 4th Duke of Montalto
- María de Aragón y de la Cerda, 5th Duchess of Montalto
- Antonio de Aragón y Moncada, 6th Duke of Montalto
- Luis Guillermo Moncada y de Aragón, 7th Duke of Montalto
- Fernando de Aragón y Moncada, 8th Duke of Montalto
- Catalina de Moncada y Aragón, 9th Duchess of Montalto
- Fadrique Vicente Álvarez de Toledo Osorio y Moncada, 10th Duke of Montalto
- Antonio Álvarez de Toledo Osorio y Pérez de Guzmán, 11th Duke of Montalto
- José Álvarez de Toledo, Duke of Alba, 12th Duke of Montalto
- Francisco de Borja Álvarez de Toledo Osorio y Gonzaga, 13th Duke of Montalto
- Pedro de Alcántara Álvarez de Toledo y Palafox, 14th Duke of Montalto
- José Joaquín Álvarez de Toledo y Silva, 15th Duke of Montalto
- José Joaquín Álvarez de Toledo y Caro, 16th Duke of Montalto
- Joaquín Álvarez de Toledo y Caro, 17th Duke of Montalto

== See also ==
- Kingdom of Aragon
- Kingdom of Naples
