= Duke of Fernandina =

Dukedom of Spain

Dukedom of Fernandina
- Creation date: 1559
- Created by: Philip II
- Peerage: Peerage of Spain
- First holder: García Álvarez de Toledo y Osorio, 1st Duke of Fernandina
- Present holder: Alonso-Enrique González de Gregorio y Viñamata, 14th Duke of Fernandina

Duke of Fernandina is a hereditary title in the peerage of Spain. It was granted by King Philip II to García Álvarez de Toledo y Osorio, Viceroy of Sicily and Catalonia, and later Marquis of Villafranca del Bierzo in inheritance from his elder brother. It was conferred on him the 24 December 1559, along with the principality of Montalbán. Fernandina is the only dukedom in Spain that is not attached to a Grandeeship. Its name makes reference to the town of Ferrandina in southern Italy.

The title was usually held by the heirs apparent of the marquises of Villafranca, and merged into the House of Medina Sidonia in 1779 when José Álvarez de Toledo, 11th Marquis of Villafranca and 8th Duke of Fernandina, inherited the dukedom of Medina Sidonia from a distant cousin. After the death of the 12th duke, José Joaquín Álvarez de Toledo, none of his sons claimed the title, so the dukedom of Fernandina became dormant. Eighty years later, the 21st duchess of Medina Sidonia and her son the Count of Niebla ceded their rights to the title to their daughter and sister, Pilar González de Gregorio, who asked for the resumption of the dormant dukedom. On 1 February 1993, the title was restored without grandeeship of Spain by King Juan Carlos I to Pilar, who became the 13th Duchess of Fernandina.

== Dukes of Fernandina (1559) ==
- García Álvarez de Toledo, 4th Marquis of Villafranca and 1st Duke of Fernandina (1514–1577).
- Pedro Álvarez de Toledo, 5th Marquis of Villafranca and 2nd Duke of Fernandina (1546–1627), eldest son of the 1st Duke.
- García Álvarez de Toledo, 6th Marquis of Villafranca and 3rd Duke of Fernandina (1579–1649), elder son of the 2nd Duke.
- Fadrique Álvarez de Toledo, 7th Marquis of Villafranca and 4th Duke of Fernandina (1635–1705), elder son of the 2nd Duke's second son.
- Fadrique Álvarez de Toledo, 8th Marquis of Villafranca and 5th Duke of Fernandina (1658–1728), eldest son of the 4th Duke.
- Fadrique Álvarez de Toledo, 9th Marquis of Villafranca and 6th Duke of Fernandina (1686–1753), elder son of the 5th Duke.
- Antonio Álvarez de Toledo, 10th Marquis of Villafranca and 7th Duke of Fernandina (1716–1773), eldest son of the 6th Duke.
- José María Álvarez de Toledo, 15th Duke of Medina Sidonia and 8th of Fernandina (1756–1796), elder son of the 7th Duke.
- Francisco de Borja Álvarez de Toledo, 16th Duke of Medina Sidonia and 9th Duke of Fernandina (1763–1821), second son of the 7th Duke.
- Francisco Álvarez de Toledo, 10th Duke of Fernandina (1799–1816), eldest son of the 9th Duke
- Pedro de Alcántara Álvarez de Toledo, 17th Duke of Medina Sidonia and 11th Duke of Fernandina (1803–1867), second son of the 9th Duke.
- José Joaquín Álvarez de Toledo, 18th Duke of Medina Sidonia and 12th Duke of Fernandina (1826–1900), elder son of the 11th Duke.

== Dukes of Fernandina (1993) ==
- Pilar González de Gregorio, 13th Duchess of Fernandina (b. 1957), great-great-granddaughter of the 12th Duke.

The title became extinct in 2012, following a legal battle of the last duchess with her nephew, Alonso González de Gregorio. However, it was rehabilitated in 2020 in favor of Alonso González de Gregorio.

- Alonso-Enrique González de Gregorio y Viñamata, 14th Duke of Fernandina (b. 1983), nephew of the 13th Duchess.

== Family tree ==
García Álvarez de Toledo, 4th Marquis of Villafranca del Bierzo, 1st Duke of Fernandina; 1514–1577
Pedro Álvarez de Toledo, 5th Marquis of Villafranca del Bierzo, 2nd Duke of Fernandina; 1546–1627
García Álvarez de Toledo, 6th Marquis of Villafranca del Bierzo, 3rd Duke of Fernandina; 1579–1649	Fadrique Álvarez de Toledo, 1st Marquis of Villanueva de Valdueza; 1580–1634
Fadrique Álvarez de Toledo, 7th Marquis of Villafranca del Bierzo, 4th Duke of Fernandina; 1635–1705
Fadrique Álvarez de Toledo, 8th Marquis of Villafranca del Bierzo, 5th Duke of Fernandina; 1658–1728
Fadrique Álvarez de Toledo, 9th Marquis of Villafranca del Bierzo, 6th Duke of Fernandina; 1686–1753
Antonio Álvarez de Toledo, 10th Marquis of Villafranca del Bierzo, 7th Duke of Fernandina; 1716–1773
José Álvarez de Toledo, 15th Duke of Medina Sidonia, 8th Duke of Fernandina; 1756–1796	Francisco de Borja Álvarez de Toledo, 16th Duke of Medina Sidonia, 9th Duke of Fernandina; 1763–1821
Francisco Álvarez de Toledo, 10th Duke of Fernandina; 1799–1816	Pedro de Alcántara Álvarez de Toledo, 17th Duke of Medina Sidonia, 11th Duke of Fernandina; 1803–1867
José Joaquín Álvarez de Toledo, 18th Duke of Medina Sidonia, 12th Duke of Fernandina; 1826- 1900
José Joaquín Álvarez de Toledo, 19th Duke of Medina Sidonia; 1865- 1915
José Joaquín Álvarez de Toledo, 20th Duke of Medina Sidonia; 1894- 1955
Luisa Isabel Álvarez de Toledo, 21st Duchess of Medina Sidonia; 1936- 2008
Pilar González de Gregorio, 13th Duchess of Fernandina b. 1957	Leoncio Alonso González de Gregorio, 22nd Duke of Medina Sidonia b. 1956
Alonso Enrique González de Gregorio, 14th Duke of Fernandina b.1983

== See also ==
- List of dukes in the peerage of Spain
