= Luisa Isabel Álvarez de Toledo, 21st Duchess of Medina Sidonia =

Duchess of Medina Sidonia

The Most Excellent Luisa Isabel Álvarez de Toledo 21st Duchess of Medina Sidonia GE OAX
- Born: 21 August 1936; Villa Guzmán el Bueno, Estoril, Portugal
- Died: 7 March 2008 (aged 71); Medina Sidonia Palace, Sanlúcar de Barrameda, Spain
- Title: Duchess of Medina Sidonia
- Spouses: Leoncio González de Gregorio (m. 1955; div. 2005) Liliana Maria Dahlmann (m. 2008)
- Children: Leoncio, 22nd Duke of Medina Sidonia; Pilar, 13th Duchess of Fernandina; Gabriel González de Gregorio
- Parent(s): Joaquín Álvarez de Toledo, 20th Duke of Medina Sidonia; María del Carmen Maura y Herrera

Luisa Isabel Álvarez de Toledo y Maura, 21st Duchess of Medina Sidonia, GE (21 August 1936 – 7 March 2008) was the holder of the Dukedom of Medina Sidonia in Spain. She was nicknamed La Duquesa Roja or The Red Duchess due to her lifelong left-wing, anti-Francoist, pro-democracy political activism.

She was the 21st Duchess of the ducal family of Medina-Sidonia, one of the most prestigious noble families and Grandees of Spain. She was also the 15th Duchess of Fernandina and Princess of Montalbán, 17th Marchioness of Villafranca del Bierzo, 18th Marchioness of los Vélez, 25th Countess of Niebla, and three times a Grandee of Spain.

== Life and family ==
Luisa Isabel was born in Estoril, Portugal, the only child of Joaquín Alvarez de Toledo y Caro, the 20th Duke of Medina Sidonia, and of María del Carmen Maura y Herrera, daughter of Gabriel Maura y Gamazo, the 1st Duke of Maura, and wife Cuban Julia de Herrera y Herrera, 5th Countess of la Mortera. Her great-grandfather was Antonio Maura, who had been Prime Minister of Spain. Actress Carmen Maura is her third cousin.

On 16 July 1955, in Mortera, Cantabria, she married José Leoncio González de Gregorio y Martí, son of Leoncio González de Gregorio y Arribas, Martínez de Azagra y Turull, and wife Leticia Martí y Rodríguez de Castro, with whom she had three children.

Her first son, Leoncio Alonso González de Gregorio y Alvarez de Toledo, born in 1956, was the 26th Count of Niebla (ceded by his mother at his birth) until the death of his mother when he inherited the titles of his mother. He married María Montserrat Viñamata y Martorell, the daughter of the 23rd Countess of Alba de Liste, in 1983, and has two children. He married Pamela García Damián in 2001. He now is the 22nd Duke of Medina Sidonia.

Her daughter, María del Pilar Leticia González de Gregorio y Alvarez de Toledo, was born in 1957 and was the 13th Duchess of Fernandina. Her first marriage was to Rafael Márquez y Osorio, 7th Count of the Torres de Alcorin, in 1977, and she has a child with him. Her second marriage is to Tomás de Terry y Merello in 1990. She has another child by this marriage.

The third child of Luisa Isabel is Gabriel Ernesto González de Gregorio y Alvarez de Toledo, born in 1958.

She and her husband lived separately since 1958 and were officially divorced in 2005.

Eleven hours before her death, 7 March 2008, Luisa Isabel married her longtime partner and secretary since 1983, Liliana Maria Dahlmann in a civil ceremony on her deathbed. Today, the Dowager Duchess Liliana Maria, her legal widow, serves as life-president of the Fundación Casa Medina Sidonia.

== Profile ==
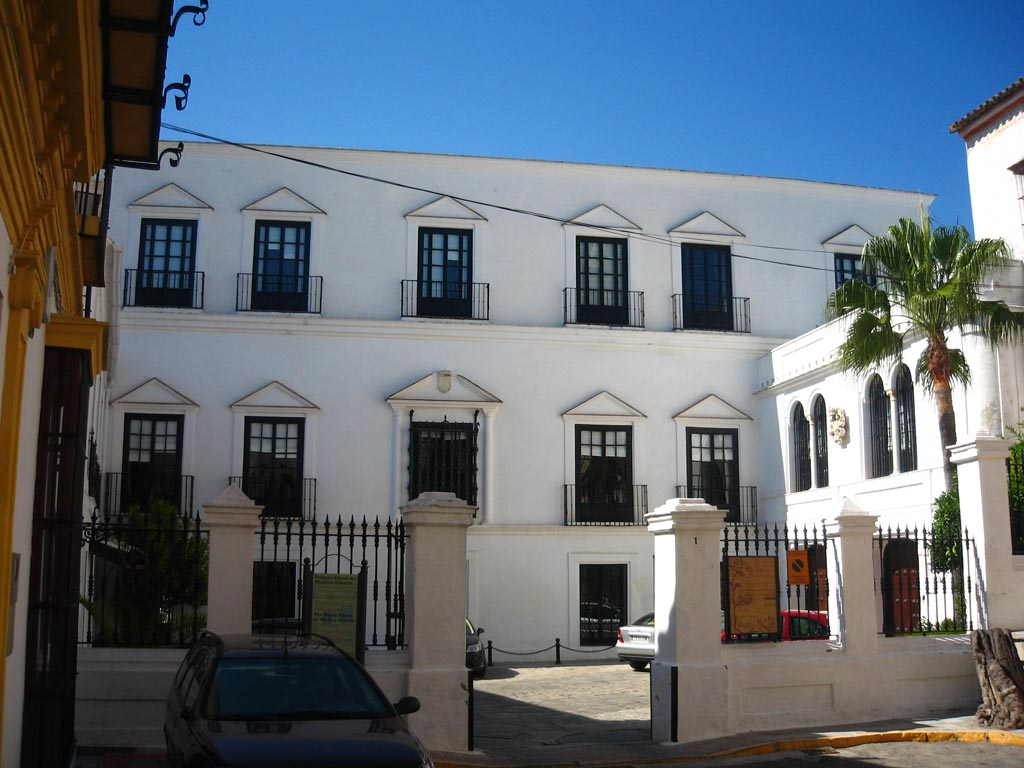
Palace of the Dukes in Sanlúcar de Barrameda.

Luisa Isabel Alvarez de Toledo was the head of the House of Medina Sidonia, the most important ducal house of Spain, with its status as a hereditary title having been granted in 1445. The principal residence of the dukes was the Palace of Medina Sidonia, located in Sanlúcar de Barrameda, Cádiz. This Palace houses the Archivo de la Casa de Medina Sidonia, one of the most important private archives in Europe.

=== Early years ===
An atypical and controversial aristocrat, she was a historian, the guardian of the ducal archives and the author of numerous works. At the age of 18, she was presented to society in Estoril, Portugal, along with the Infanta Pilar de Borbón.

=== Political views ===
Despite her aristocratic heritage and upbringing, she held strong socialist ideals throughout her life. She is said to have been a member of the then illegal Spanish Socialist Workers' Party (PSOE).

Her anti-Francoist activities brought about her incarceration in the prison of Alcalá de Henares during the 1960s. It was from this time that she became popularly known as the "Red Duchess." She established and, until her death, was an active president of the Fundación Casa Medina Sidonia that manages the Archivo de la Casa de Medina Sidonia, the major part of the patrimony of the House of Medina Sidonia, and she continued her work as an historian and author.

=== Death ===
Luisa Isabel Alvarez de Toledo died on 7 March 2008, at the age of 71, in Sanlúcar de Barrameda, Spain.

== Ancestry ==
Ancestors of Luisa Isabel Álvarez de Toledo, 21st Duchess of Medina Sidonia

16. Pedro de Alcántara Álvarez de Toledo, 17th Duke of Medina Sidonia
8. José Joaquín Álvarez de Toledo, 18th Duke of Medina Sidonia
17. María Joaquina de Silva y Téllez-Girón
4. José Joaquín Álvarez de Toledo, 19th Duke of Medina Sidonia
18. Pedro Caro, 4th Marquis of la Romana (=20)
9. Rosalía Caro y Álvarez de Toledo
19. María Tomasa Álvarez de Toledo y Palafox (=21)
2. Joaquín Álvarez de Toledo, 20th Duke of Medina Sidonia
20. Pedro Caro, 4th Marquis of la Romana (=18)
10. Carlos Caro, 18th Count of Caltavuturo
21. María Tomasa Álvarez de Toledo y Palafox (=19)
5. Rosalía Caro y Caro
22. Buenaventura Caro y Caro
11. María de la Encarnación Caro y Gumucio
23. María del Carmen de Gumucio y Ugarte-Barrientos
1. Luisa Isabel Álvarez de Toledo, 21st Duchess of Medina Sidonia
24. Bartolomé Maura y Gelabert
12. Antonio Maura y Montaner
25. Margarita Montaner y Llampayes
6. Gabriel Maura, 1st Duke of Maura
26. Timoteo Gamazo y Sanz
13. Constancia Gamazo y Calvo
27. Estefanía Calvo y del Caño
3. María del Carmen Maura y Herrera
28. Pedro de Herrera y Sancibrián
14. Ramón de Herrera, 3rd Count of la Mortera
29. María Guitérrez y Herrera
7. Julia de Herrera y Herrera, 4th Countess of la Mortera
30. Cosme de Herrera, 2nd Count of la Mortera
15. Juana de Herrera y Sosa
31. Juana Sosa y Marcos

== Titles and honour ==
- Noble titles recognized by the Spanish Ministry of Justice:
  - Duchess of Medina-Sidonia, Grandee of Spain (1957)
  - Duchess of Fernandina
  - Marchioness of Villafranca del Bierzo, Grandee of Spain (1957)
  - Marchioness of Los Vélez, Grandee of Spain (1951)
- Titles who were recognized in the Kingdom of Italy
  - Princess of Montalbano, in the Kingdom of Naples (1957)
  - Countess of Sclafani (1957)
  - Countess of Adernò (1957)
  - Countess of Caltabellotta (1957)
  - Countess of Caltaxineta (1957)
  - Countess of Caltabuturo (1959)
  - Countess of Collesano (1962)
  - Marchioness of Calatafimi (1959)
  - Baroness of Molins del Rey (1959)
  - Baroness of Centorvi (1959)
  - Baroness of Biancavilla (1959)

Honour

- Spain: Knight Grand Cross of the Civil Order of Alfonso X, the Wise

== See also ==
- Duke of Medina Sidonia

Spanish nobility
Preceded by Joaquín Álvarez de Toledo	Duchess of Medina-Sidonia; 1955–2008	Succeeded by Leoncio González de Gregorio
Preceded by Joaquín Álvarez de Toledo	Duchess of Fernandina	Succeeded by Pilar González de Gregorio y Alvarez de Toledo
Preceded by Joaquín Álvarez de Toledo	Marchioness of Villafranca del Bierzo	Succeeded by Leoncio González de Gregorio
Preceded by Joaquín Álvarez de Toledo	Marchioness of Los Vélez	Succeeded by Leoncio González de Gregorio
