= Leoncio Alonso González de Gregorio, 22nd Duke of Medina Sidonia =

Spanish nobleman and professor of History

The Most Excellent The Duke of Medina Sidonia GE
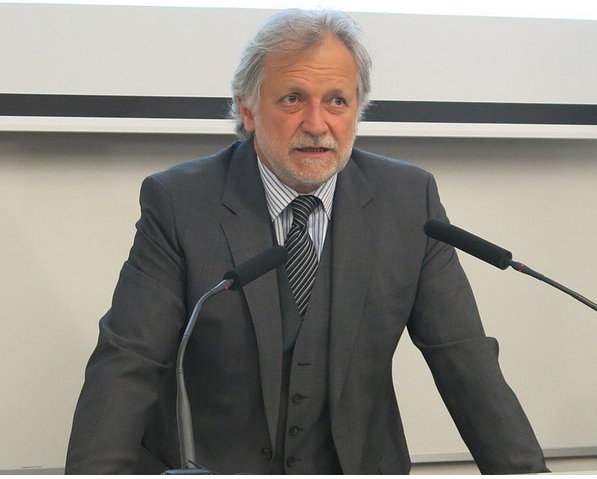
- The Duke of Medina Sidonia in a conference at IE University, 2015

Personal details
- Born: Leoncio Alonso González de Gregorio y Álvarez de Toledo; 3 January 1956 (age 70) Madrid, Spain
- Spouses: María Montserrat Viñamata y Martorell (m. 1983; div. 1998) Pamela García Damián (m. 2001)
- Children: Alonso Enrique González de Gregorio y Viñamata; María de la Soledad González de Gregorio y Viñamata
- Parents: Leoncio González de Gregorio y Martí (father); Luisa Isabel Álvarez de Toledo, 21st Duchess of Medina Sidonia (mother)
- Education: Colegio del Pilar
- Profession: History professor

Leoncio Alonso González de Gregorio y Álvarez de Toledo, 22nd Duke of Medina Sidonia, GE (born 3 January 1956) is a Spanish aristocrat and historian.

Born in Madrid, Medina Sidonia is the eldest son of Leoncio González de Gregorio y Martí and his wife Luisa Isabel Álvarez de Toledo, 21st Duchess of Medina Sidonia. The Duke is Professor of History at the University of Castile-La Mancha and of the Diplomatic School of the Ministry of Foreign Affairs and Cooperation.

== Family ==
González de Gregorio married his distant cousin María Montserrat Viñamata y Martorell, the younger daughter of Luis Viñamata y Emmanueli and María de la Concepción Martorell, 23rd Countess of Alba de Liste, firstly, on 12 December 1983, and divorced in 1998. They had two children:

- Don Alonso Enrique González de Gregorio y Viñamata, 14th Duke of Fernandina (b. 1983)
- Doña María de la Soledad González de Gregorio y Viñamata (b. 1989), who married in September 2017, Jérémy Bégard.

The Duke married Pamela García Damián, of Venezuelan origin, daughter of Armando García Liceaga y Pérez de Viñaspre and María Pilar Damián Gracia, secondly, in 2001.

== Ancestry ==
Ancestors of Leoncio Alonso González de Gregorio, 22nd Duke of Medina Sidonia

16. Pedro González de Gregorio y López-Montenegro
8. Leoncio González de Gregorio y Martínez de Azagra
17. Micaela Martínez de Azagra y Garcés de Marcilla
4. Leoncio González de Gregorio y Arribas
18. Julián Casildo de Arribas y Arauz
9. María de la Concepción de Arribas y Turull
19. María de la Concepción Turull y Comadrán
2. Leoncio González de Gregorio y Martí
20. Francisco Martí y Díaz de Jáuregui
10. Ernesto Martí y Saccone
21. Ernestina Saccone
5. María Leticia Martí y Rodríguez de Castro
22. Manuel Rodríguez de Castro y Mena
11. Isabel Rodríguez de Castro y Bueno
23. Leticia Bueno, 1st Marchioness of Bueno
1. Leoncio Alonso González de Gregorio, 22nd Duke of Medina Sidonia
24. José Joaquín Álvarez de Toledo, 18th Duke of Medina Sidonia
12. José Joaquín Álvarez de Toledo, 19th Duke of Medina Sidonia
25. Rosalía Caro y Álvarez de Toledo
6. Joaquín Álvarez de Toledo, 20th Duke of Medina Sidonia
26. Carlos Caro, 18th Count of Caltavuturo
13. Rosalía Caro y Caro
27. María de la Encarnación Caro y Gumucio
3. Luisa Isabel Álvarez de Toledo, 21st Duchess of Medina Sidonia
28. Antonio Maura y Montaner
14. Gabriel Maura, 1st Duke of Maura
29. Constancia Gamazo y Calvo
7. María del Carmen Maura y Herrera
30. Ramón de Herrera, 3rd Count of la Mortera
15. Julia de Herrera, 5th Countess of la Mortera
31. Juana de Herrera y Sosa

== Titles and styles ==
=== Titles ===
- 22nd Duke of Medina Sidonia, Grandee of Spain
- 18th Marquess of Villafranca del Bierzo, Grandee of Spain
- 17th Marquess of los Vélez, Grandee of Spain
- 26th Count of Niebla

=== Styles ===
- The Most Excellent The Count of Niebla (1956–2008)
- The Most Excellent The Duke of Medina Sidonia (2008– )

Spanish nobility
Vacant Title last held by Joaquín Álvarez de Toledo	Count of Niebla; 28 November 1956 –	Incumbent; Heir: Alonso Enrique González de Gregorio y Viñamata
Preceded by Luisa Isabel Álvarez de Toledo	Duke of Medina Sidonia; 1 September 2008 –	Incumbent; Heir: Alonso Enrique González de Gregorio y Viñamata
Preceded by Luisa Isabel Álvarez de Toledo	Marquess of Villafranca del Bierzo; 23 June 2010 –	Incumbent; Heir: Alonso Enrique González de Gregorio y Viñamata
Preceded by Luisa Isabel Álvarez de Toledo	Marquess of los Vélez; 23 June 2010 –	Incumbent; Heir: Alonso Enrique González de Gregorio y Viñamata
