= Fernando Joaquín Fajardo de Requeséns y Zúñiga =

Spanish aristocrat (1635–1695)

Fernando Joaquín Fajardo de Requeséns y Zúñiga (Zaragoza, 1635 – Madrid, 2 November 1693), VI Marquess of Los Vélez, V Marquis of Molina, II Marquis of Martorell, etc.., Grandee of Spain was a Spanish noble and politician.

== Biography ==
He was the second son of Pedro III Fajardo, 5th Marquis of Los Vélez and his second wife Mariana Engracia Álvarez de Toledo y Portugal.
The heir to all the titles in the family was his brother Pedro, but he decided to become a clergyman, and Don Fernando became the holder of all the titles after his father died in 1647.

His maternal cousin was Manuel Joaquín Álvarez de Toledo, Count of Oropesa, and his brother in law was Juan Francisco de la Cerda, 8th Duke of Medinaceli, two key figures during the reign of Carlos II of Spain. Furthermore, his mother, as the King's governess, enjoyed the trust of Queen Mariana of Austria and for many years was the person closest to Carlos II. Her function as governess, together with her sympathy for Juan Everardo Nithard, made it probable that the first positions of the marquis in the administration were directly related to the influence of his mother and family at Court.

His first important position was that of Governor of Oran in 1666, where he organized the expulsion of the Jews. In 1673 he was appointed Viceroy of Sardinia. In 1675 he became Viceroy of Naples, still in the grip of the Messina revolt, where he remained until January 1683.
After his return to Spain, he was part of the Council of State and later held the presidency of the Council of the Indies.
He became a key piece of the policy of economic regeneration undertaken by Oropesa, who valued the experience Don Fernando had acquired in financial affairs during his government in the Kingdom of Naples. In 1687, inspired by the institutional reforms applied in France by Jean-Baptiste Colbert, the position of Superintendente general de Hacienda (General Superintendent of the Treasury) was created for the Marquis of Los Vélez.
The dismissal of Oropesa in 1691, forced him to abandon his post as Superintendent of the Treasury and to retire from his post as President of the Council of the Indies, on 20 September 1693. He died a few weeks later.

=== Marriages ===
Don Fernando married twice :

- María Juana de Aragón Córdoba y Sandoval (1637-1686), sister of the Duke of Medinaceli
- Isabel Rosa de Ayala Toledo y Faxardo, X Marquesa de la Mota (1660-1717), daughter of Fernando de Ayala Fonseca y Toledo, III conde de Ayala.

There were no children from these marriages and he was succeeded by his sister Maria Teresa Fajardo de Portugal, who married Fernando de Moncada y Aragón, VIII Duke of Montalto.

== Sources ==
- Real Academia de la Historia
- Geni
