= Fadrique Vicente Álvarez de Toledo Osorio y Pimentel =

Fadrique Vicente Álvarez de Toledo Osorio y Pimentel (Madrid, 5 April 1686 - Madrid, 1 November 1753), 9th Marquis of Villafranca del Bierzo, Grandee of Spain, was a Spanish nobleman from the 18th century. He was Mayordomo mayor to King Ferdinand VI and Knight of the Order of the Golden Fleece.

== Biography ==
He was the son of José Fadrique Álvarez de Toledo, 8th Marquis of Villafranca del Bierzo, Grandee of Spain, and Catalina de Aragón y Moncada, 8th Duchess of Montalto, Grandee of Spain. In 1727, he succeeded his father as 9th Marquis of Villafranca del Bierzo, 6th Duke of Fernandina, 4th Marquess of Valdueza, 6th Prince of Montalbán and inherited from his mother the titles of 9th Marquis of Los Vélez, 9th Duke of Montalto, 7th Duke of Bivona, 8th Marquis of Molina and 6th Marquis of Martorell.

At court, he was successively Gentleman of the Bedchamber to King Philip V, and then Mayordomo mayor to Queen Maria Anna of Neuburg and Governor of the Royal Stables (until April 1729). Later he became Mayordomo mayor of King Ferdinand VI from 4 December 1747, until his death. He was awarded the collar of the Order of the Golden Fleece on 12 April 1750.

=== Marriage and children ===
He married Juana Pérez de Guzmán (1693–1736) in Madrid on 11 November 1713. She was the daughter of Manuel Pérez de Guzmán, 12th Duke of Medina Sidonia, Grandee of Spain, and Luisa María de Silva y Mendoza.
They had 5 children, including :

- Antonio Álvarez de Toledo (1716–1773), his successor

Spanish nobility
Preceded by José Fadrique Álvarez de Toledo	Duke of Fernandina; 1727–1753	Succeeded by Antonio Álvarez de Toledo
Preceded by José Fadrique Álvarez de Toledo	Marquess of Villafranca; 1727–1753	Succeeded by Antonio Álvarez de Toledo
