= José Joaquín Álvarez de Toledo, 18th Duke of Medina Sidonia =

Spanish aristocrat and politician

The Most Excellent José Joaquín Álvarez de Toledo 18th Duke of Medina Sidonia GE
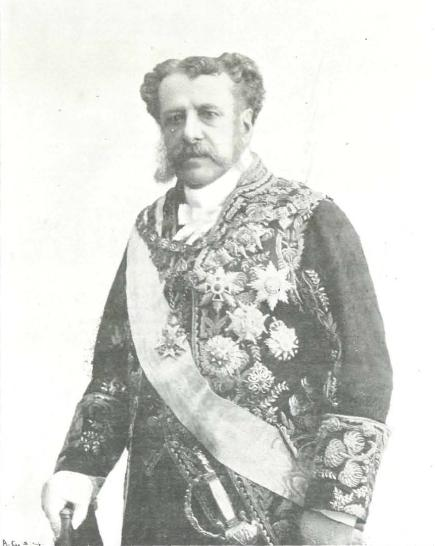
- Born: José Joaquín Álvarez de Toledo y Silva; 14 August 1826; Madrid, Spain
- Died: 15 February 1900 (aged 73); Madrid, Spain

José Joaquín Álvarez de Toledo y Silva, 18th Duke of Medina Sidonia, GE (Madrid, Spain; 14 August 1826 – 15 February 1900) was a Spanish aristocrat and politician who served as Superior Chief of the Palace from 1885 until his death. He was a knight of the Real Maestranza de Caballería de Sevilla and of the Order of Alcántara.

== Early life ==
The Duke was the elder son of Pedro de Alcántara Álvarez de Toledo, 13th Marquis of Villafranca and María del Pilar Joaquina de Silva, fifth daughter of José Gabriel de Silva, 10th Marquis of Santa Cruz and Joaquina Téllez-Girón y Pimentel, daughter of Pedro Téllez-Girón, 9th Duke of Osuna and María Josefa Pimentel, 14th Countess Duchess of Benavente.

He was educated at the Theresian Military Academy, in Austro-Hungary, where his father was exiled for being a carlist sympathiser.

== Career ==
In 1847, Queen Isabella II lifted the seizure of the properties of the Medina Sidonias in Spain, and the family was able to return. The young Pepe, by then Marquis of los Vélez, started his political career, taking a seat in 1852 at the Parliament of the Two Sicilies, as Prince of Paternò. He succeeded in the dukedom in 1862, and following the Restoration of the monarchy in 1874, became senator in his own right in 1875 and for the province of Cádiz in 1876.

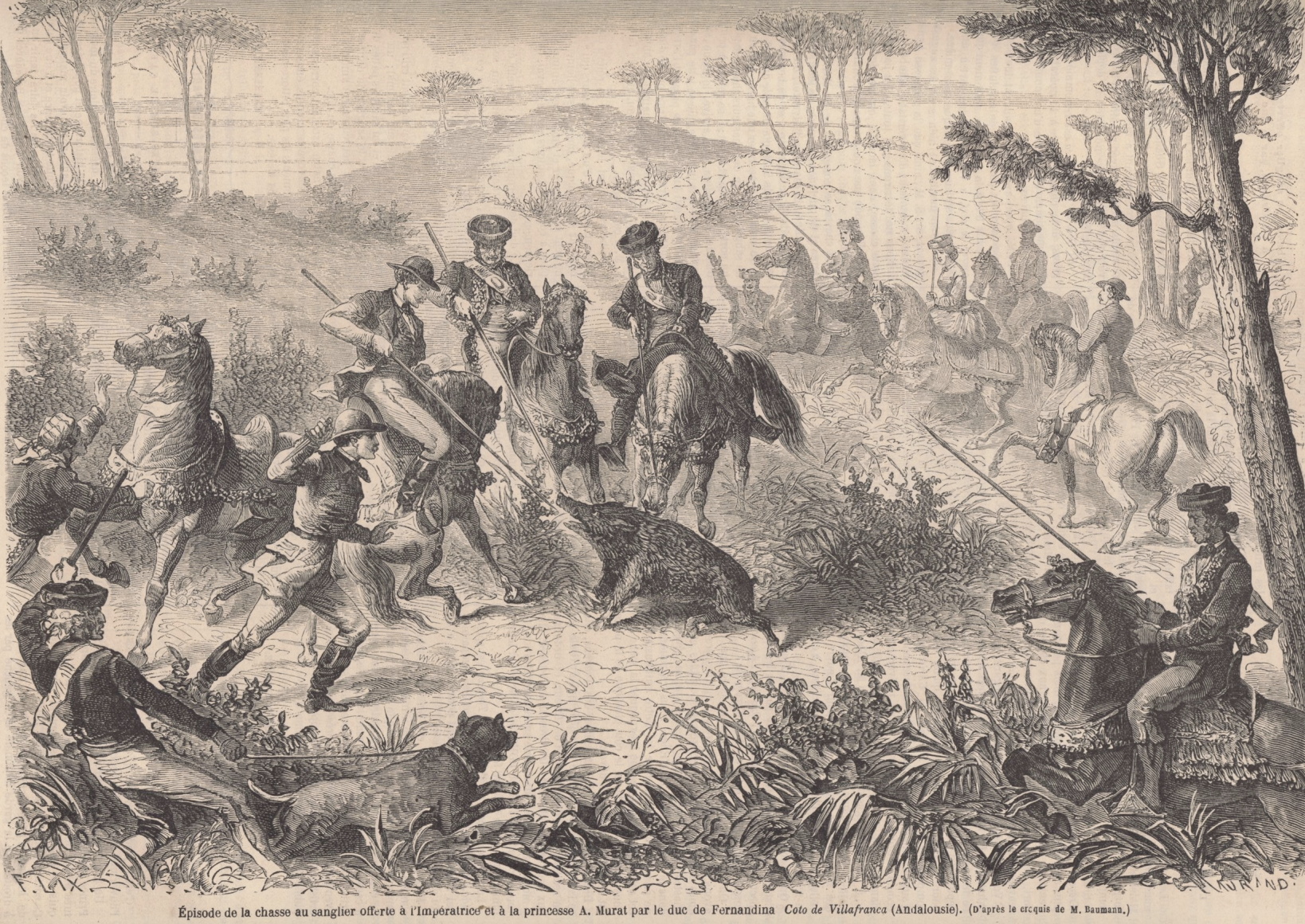
Hunt organized by the duke for Empress Eugénie and Anne Murat in his finca, "Coto de Villafranca" (now Doñana), 1863

From 1885, he served as Superior Chief of Palace with King Alfonso XIII, and was part of the extraordinary embassy, headed by the Duke of Montpensier, sent to Russia in 1883 to represent Spain at the coronation of Tsar Alexander III. He received numerous honours and decorations, including the Golden Fleece, the Collar of the Order of Charles III and the Grand Cross of the Order of the Immaculate Conception of Vila Viçosa.

== Personal life ==
On 26 September 1846, Medina Sidonia married his first cousin Rosalía Caro y Álvarez de Toledo, daughter of Pedro Caro, 4th Marquis of la Romana and granddaughter of Pedro Caro, 3rd Marquis of la Romana, in Erpel, Austro-Hungary. They had four children:

1. Doña María del Socorro Álvarez de Toledo (1847–1929), married Don José Maria Ortuño de Ezpeleta, 4th Duke of Castroterreño and had issue.
2. Don Alonso Álvarez de Toledo, 15th Marquis of los Vélez (1850–1897), married Doña María Trinidad Caballero, daughter of Andrés Caballero, 1st Marquis of Somosancho. Died before succeeding his father and without issue.
3. Doña Inés Álvarez de Toledo, 16th Marquise of Cazaza en África (1857–1937), married Don Fernando Ramírez de Haro, 13th Count of Bornos, and had issue.
4. Don José Joaquín Álvarez de Toledo, 19th Duke of Medina Sidonia, who succeeded in the titles of his father.

== Titles ==
=== Spain ===
- 18th Duke of Medina Sidonia
- 14th Marquess of Villafranca del Bierzo
- 14th Marquess of Vélez

=== Two Sicilies ===
- 15th Duke of Montalto
- 12th Duke of Fernandina
- 11th Prince of Montalbán
- 15th Count of Caltavuturo
- Count of Collesano
- Count of Adernò
- Lord of Petralia Sottana y Soprana

== Ancestry ==
Ancestors of José Joaquín Álvarez de Toledo, 18th Duke of Medina Sidonia

16. Fadrique Álvarez de Toledo, 9th Marquis of Villafranca
8. Antonio Álvarez de Toledo, 10th Marquis of Villafranca
17. Juana Pérez de Guzmán y Silva
4. Francisco de Borja Álvarez de Toledo, 12th Marquis of Villafranca
18. Francesco Gonzaga, 1st Duke of Solferino
9. Princess Maria Antonia Gonzaga
19. Giulia Caracciolo di Santo Buono
2. Pedro de Alcántara Álvarez de Toledo, 13th Marquis of Villafranca
20. Joaquín Palafox, 6th Marquis of Ariza
10. Felipe de Palafox y Croÿ d'Havré
21. Princess Marie Charlotte of Croÿ d'Havré
5. María Tomasa Palafox y Portocarrero
22. Cristóbal Portocarrero, 5th Count of Montijo
11. María Francisca Portocarrero, 6th Countess of Montijo
23. María Josefa de Zúñiga y Téllez-Girón
1. José Joaquín Álvarez de Toledo, 18th Duke of Medina Sidonia
24. Pedro de Silva, 8th Marquis of Santa Cruz
12. José Joaquín de Silva, 9th Marquis of Santa Cruz
25. María Cayetana Sarmiento, 5th Countess of Pie de Concha
6. José Gabriel de Silva, 10th Marquis of Santa Cruz
26. Count Emanuel Filibert of Waldstein-Wartenberg
13. Countess Mariana of Waldstein-Wartenberg
27. Princess Maria Anna Theresia of Lichtenstein
3. María Joaquina de Silva y Téllez-Girón
28. Pedro Téllez-Girón, 8th Duke of Osuna
14. Pedro Téllez-Girón, 9th Duke of Osuna
29. María Vicenta Pacheco y Téllez-Giron
7. Joauqina Téllez-Girón y Pimentel
30. Francisco Pimentel, 13th Count Duke of Benavente
15. María Josefa Pimentel, 14th Countess Duchess of Benavente
31. María Faustina Téllez-Girón y Pérez de Guzmán

Spanish nobility
Preceded by Pedro de Alcántara Álvarez de Toledo	Marquis of los Vélez; 1864–1868	Succeeded by Alonso Álvarez de Toledo
Preceded by Pedro de Alcántara Álvarez de Toledo	Duke of Medina Sidonia; 10 January 1868 – 15 February 1900	Succeeded by José Joaquín Álvarez de Toledo
Preceded by Pedro de Alcántara Álvarez de Toledo	Marquis of Villafranca del Bierzo; 10 January 1868 – 15 February 1900	Succeeded by José Joaquín Álvarez de Toledo
Preceded by Pedro de Alcántara Álvarez de Toledo	Duke of Fernandina; 10 January 1868 – 15 February 1900	Dormant Title next held by Pilar González de Gregorio
