= Duke of Medina Sidonia =

Dukedom of Spain

Dukedom of Medina Sidonia
- Creation date: 1380
- Created by: John I
- Peerage: Peerage of Spain
- First holder: Enrique de Castilla y Sousa, 1st Duke of Medina Sidonia
- Present holder: Leoncio Alonso González de Gregorio y Álvarez de Toledo, 22nd Duke of Medina Sidonia

Duke of Medina Sidonia (Spanish: Duque de Medina Sidonia) is a peerage grandee title of Spain in Medina-Sidonia, holding the oldest extant dukedom in the kingdom, first awarded by King John I of Castile in 1380. His father, Henry II of Castile (c.1334-1379), had an illegitimate son named Enrique de Castilla y de Sousa with Juana de Sousa, but after being made a Duke by his half-brother in 1380, he died in 1404, without a successor. The title then returned to the Crown.

The title of Duke of Medina Sidonia was awarded a second time on February 1445 by King John II of Castile to Juan Alonso de Guzmán, 3rd Count of Niebla (1410-1468). They were once the most prominent magnate family of the Andalusian region, the best-known of whom, Don Alonso Pérez de Guzmán y Sotomayor, 7th Duke of Medina Sidonia, commanded the Spanish Armada at the end of the 16th century. The defeat at the hands of weather and the English in 1588 brought disgrace to this family. The House of Medina Sidonia traces its descent from Alonso Pérez de Guzmán (1265-1309).

== Counts of Niebla, 1369–1445 ==
From	To	Count of Niebla
c. 1369	1396	Juan Alonso de Guzmán, 1st Count of Niebla
1396	1436	Enrique Pérez de Guzmán, 2nd Count of Niebla
1436	1468	Juan Alonso de Guzmán, 3rd Count of Niebla

== Dukes of Medina Sidonia, 1445–present ==
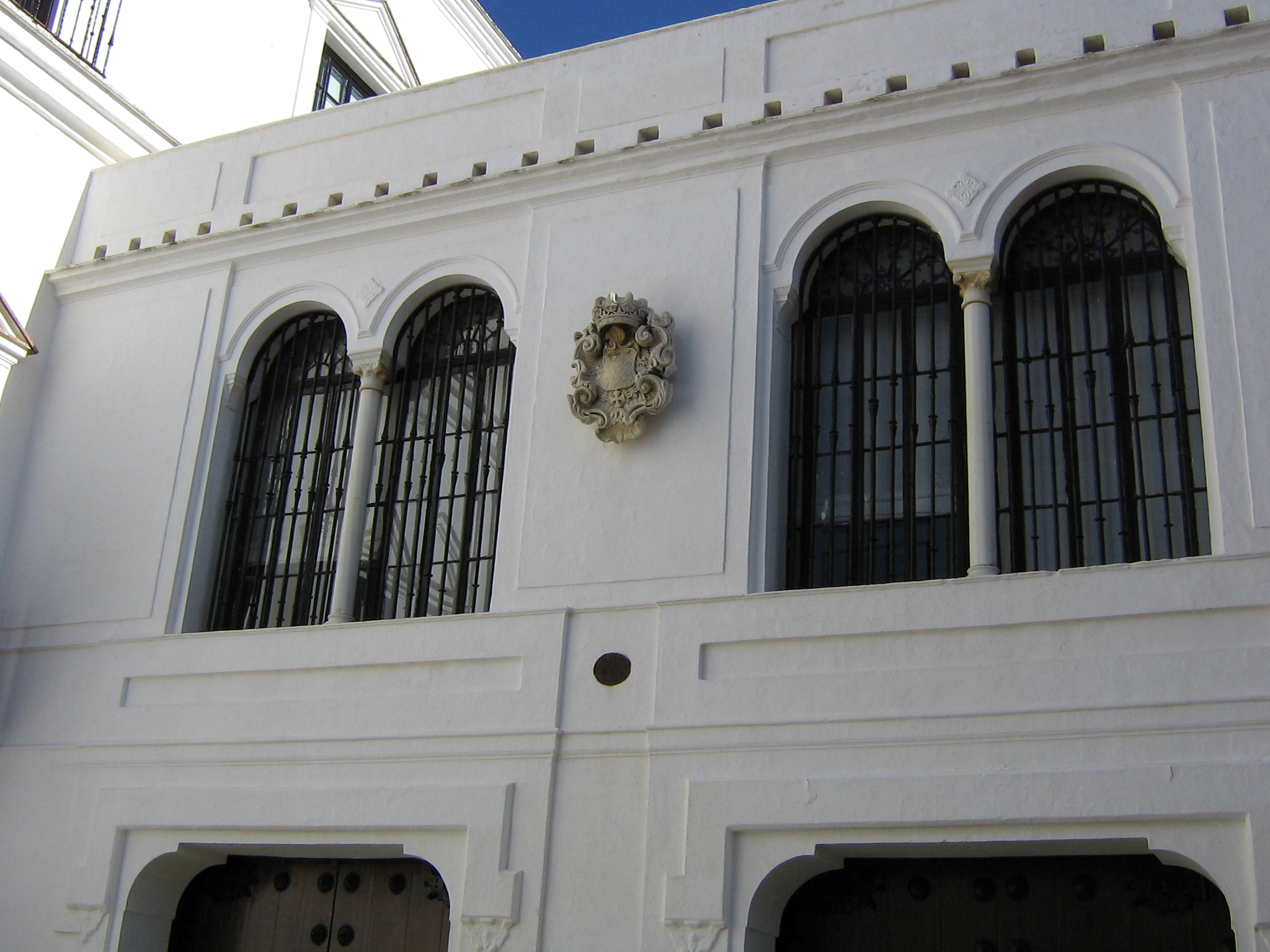
The facade of the palace of the Duke of Medina-Sidonia

From	To	Duke of Medina Sidonia
1445	1468	Juan Alonso de Guzmán, 1st Duke of Medina Sidonia
1468	1492	Enrique Pérez de Guzmán y Fonseca, 2nd Duke of Medina Sidonia
1492	1507	Juan Alonso Pérez de Guzmán, 3rd Duke of Medina Sidonia
1507	1512	Enrique Pérez de Guzmán, 4th Duke of Medina Sidonia
1513	1518	Alfonso Pérez de Guzmán, 5th Duke of Medina Sidonia
1518	1559	Juan Alonso Pérez de Guzmán, 6th Duke of Medina Sidonia
1559	1615	Alonso Pérez de Guzmán y Sotomayor, 7th Duke of Medina Sidonia
1615	1636	Manuel Pérez de Guzmán y Silva, 8th Duke of Medina Sidonia
1636	1664	Gaspar Alfonso Pérez de Guzmán, 9th Duke of Medina Sidonia
1664	1667	Gaspar Juan Pérez de Guzmán, 10th Duke of Medina Sidonia
1667	1713	Juan Claros Pérez de Guzmán, 11th Duke of Medina Sidonia
1713	1721	Manuel Pérez de Guzmán, 12th Duke of Medina Sidonia
1721	1739	Domingo José Claros Pérez de Guzmán, 13th Duke of Medina Sidonia
1739	1779	Pedro de Alcántara Alonso Pérez de Guzmán, 14th Duke of Medina Sidonia
1779	1796	José Álvarez de Toledo, Duke of Alba (jure uxoris), 15th Duke of Medina Sidonia
1796	1821	Francisco de Borja Álvarez de Toledo, 16th Duke of Medina Sidonia
1821	1867	Pedro de Alcántara Álvarez de Toledo, 17th Duke of Medina Sidonia
1867	1900	José Joaquín Álvarez de Toledo, 18th Duke of Medina Sidonia
1905	1915	José Joaquín Álvarez de Toledo, 19th Duke of Medina Sidonia
1915	1955	Joaquín Álvarez de Toledo, 20th Duke of Medina Sidonia
1955	2008	Luisa Isabel Álvarez de Toledo, 21st Duchess of Medina Sidonia
2008	present	Leoncio Alonso González de Gregorio, 22nd Duke of Medina Sidonia

== See also ==
- Almadraba – the concession on almadrabas (tuna traps along the Mediterranean coast) was one of the sources of the fortune of the Medina Sidonias
- House of Olivares
- House of Guzmán
- House of Medina Sidonia
