= Pedro de Alcántara Álvarez de Toledo, 13th Marquess of Villafranca =

Spanish Minister of Naval affairs

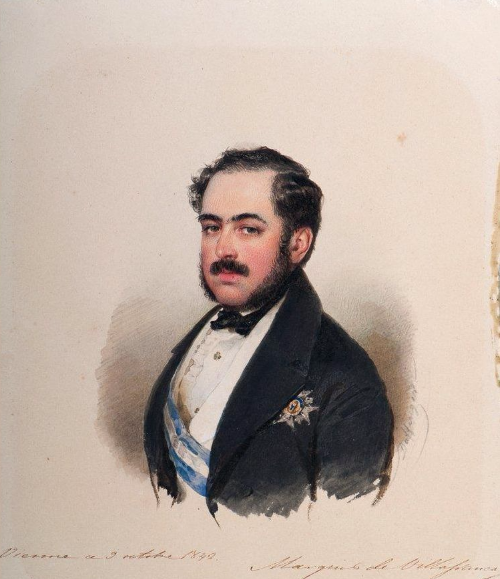
Portrait of the Marquess of Villafranca by Moritz Michael Daffinger.

Pedro de Alcántara Álvarez de Toledo y Palafox, 12th Marquess of Molina, 13th Marquess of Villafranca (11 May 1803 in Madrid – 10 January 1867 in Madrid) was Spanish Minister of Naval Affairs, mid-19th century, reign of Isabella II of Spain counting amongst other political achievements the construction and launch in the Royal Dockyards of Ferrol, of Spain's first steam propelled ship in 1858. The ship was named after the Spanish monarch Isabel II. Medina Sidonia was succeeded by his son José Joaquín Álvarez de Toledo, 18th Duke of Medina Sidonia.

He married Joaquina de Silva y Téllez Girón in 1822. He identified with the Carlist movement. He was then part of the Senate of Spain during the 1860s as a senator of his own right.

Spanish nobility
Preceded by Francisco de Borja Álvarez de Toledo	Marquess of Villafranca; 1821–1867	Succeeded by José Joaquín Álvarez de Toledo
Preceded by Francisco de Borja Álvarez de Toledo	Duke of Medina Sidonia; 1821–1867	Succeeded by José Joaquín Álvarez de Toledo
