= Joaquín Álvarez de Toledo, 20th Duke of Medina Sidonia =

Duke of Medina Sidonia

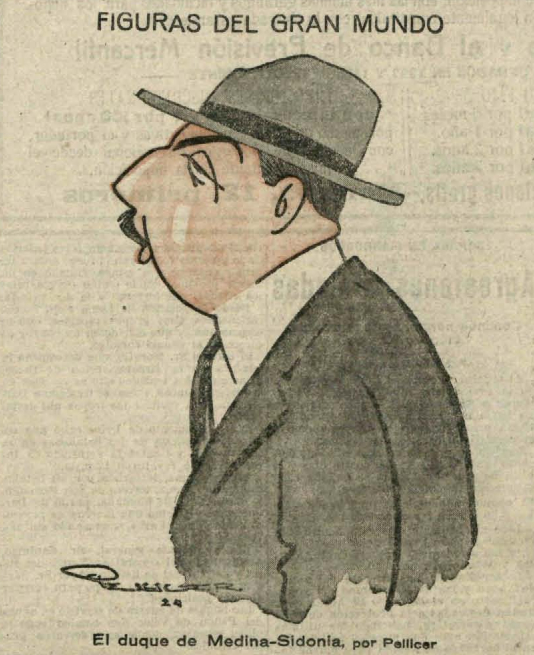
cartoon of the Duke by Tomás Pellicer (9 October 1924)

José Joaquín Álvarez de Toledo y Caro, 20th Duke of Medina Sidonia (18 April 1894 – 11 December 1955) became Duke of Medina Sidonia in 1915.

== Biography ==
He was the eldest son of José Joaquín Álvarez de Toledo, 19th Duke of Medina Sidonia (1865–1915) and Rosalía Caro y Caro.

On 12 October 1931, he married in Biarritz, France, María del Carmen Maura (1905–1946), a daughter of Gabriel Maura Gamazo, 1st Duke of Maura, the son of Antonio Maura, a Prime Minister of the Spanish Crown.

In the 1933 Spanish general election, Joaquín Álvarez de Toledo ran as a right-wing candidate for Madrid, a political activity he shared with his wife, and which led them to take extreme right-wing positions. In 1936, with the proclamation of the Second Spanish Republic, the entire Maura family went into self-imposed exile in Portugal.
In 1937, the family returned to their palace in Sanlúcar de Barrameda, which was under control of the Francoist Army. They opened a dispensary and provided meals for the many hungry.

On 21 August 1936, their only daughter Luisa Isabel Álvarez de Toledo was born, who succeeded her father in 1955.

Spanish nobility
Preceded by José Joaquín Álvarez de Toledo	Duke of Medina Sidonia; 1915–1955	Succeeded by Luisa Isabel Álvarez de Toledo
