= José Joaquín Álvarez de Toledo, 19th Duke of Medina Sidonia =

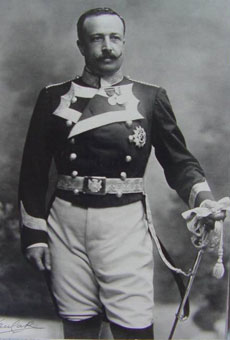
Joaquin Alvarez de Toledo, 19th Duke of Medina Sidonia. Photograph by Kaulak

José Joaquín Álvarez de Toledo y Caro, 19th Duke of Medina Sidonia (28 December 1865 – 9 June 1915) was Duke of Medina Sidonia from 1905.

== Early life ==
He was born the second son of José Álvarez de Toledo y Silva, 18th Duke of Medina Sidonia, and Rosalía Caro y Álvarez de Toledo, daughter of the 4th Marquis of La Romana.

He was originally the Marquis of Molina, but on the death of his older brother Alonso, he became the heir to all the titles of the house of Medina Sidonia.

== Career ==
He was educated in Spain, but was never interested in politics or a military career. He devoted almost his entire life to his farms in Rafol, Novelda, Molina de Segura and the pastures of Jimena de la Frontera.

He managed his estate very well, but when he inherited the bulk of the family assets, he had to deal with a huge amount of debt that his father had acquired. The most urgent ones were solved with the sale of the Coto de Doñana to Guillermo Garvey, for 750,000 pesetas.

As Grandee of Spain, he held important positions at court, such as Gentleman of the King's Chamber, or Chief Knight of María de las Mercedes, Princess of Asturias. He held the Collar of the Order of Carlos III, and was Master of the Real Maestranza de Caballería de Valencia.

To deal with other debts, he was forced to sell his palace on playa de la Concha, in San Sebastián, the Martorell castle and the Jimena de la Frontera estates, as well as the Castillo de Vélez-Blanco for around 80,000 pesetas.

== Personal life ==
In Madrid in 1893 he married his cousin Rosalía Caro y Caro, granddaughter of Pedro Caro, 4th Marquis of La Romana.
They had 5 children :

- Joaquín Álvarez de Toledo, 20th Duke of Medina Sidonia (1894–1955), his successor. Had issue.
- Alonso Álvarez de Toledo y Caro, (1895-1936), 16th Marquis of Molina, never married and had no issue.
- María Álvarez de Toledo y Caro (1898-1974), 3rd Duchess of Santa Cristina, married Rafael Márquez y Castillejo.
- José Álvarez de Toledo y Caro (1899-1957), never married.
- María del Rosario Álvarez de Toledo y Caro (1901-1955), 3rd Marquise of Valverde, married Salvador Ferrandis y Luna.

He died in his Madrid palace on 9 June 1915.

Spanish nobility
Preceded by José Joaquín Álvarez de Toledo	Duke of Medina Sidonia; 1905–1915	Succeeded by Joaquín Álvarez de Toledo
