= List of people associated with the Revolt of the Brotherhoods =

This is a list of figures who participated in the Revolt of the Brotherhoods, an antiseigneurial uprising in the Kingdom of Valencia in the Crown of Aragon. The Germanies (Catalan for "brotherhoods") were guilds who came to govern the city of Valencia in 1519, and eventually spread over the Kingdom. Their spread, however, also became a violent turn against the government which had previously tolerated and supported them, and war lasted until 1522.

== Royalists ==
=== King Charles I ===
King Charles I of Castile and Aragon (1500–1558), elected Holy Roman Emperor Charles V in 1519, was the head of the Aragonese state. He only succeeded the throne upon King Ferdinand of Aragon's death in 1516, and knew none of the languages of Spain at first. An eighteen-year-old Charles visited Aragon from May 1518– January 1520 to be formally crowned King and negotiate with the Aragonese Cortes over tax rights. As a poorer country, Charles demanded less from Aragon than Castile, and taxes were not a major factor in the Revolt of the Germanies (unlike the Revolt of the Comuneros of Castile). Charles issued the edicts allowing the Germanies to arm themselves against the Barbary pirates, a decision that would later haunt him.

In 1520, Charles left Spain for Germany to take up his position as Holy Roman Emperor, leaving Cardinal Adrian of Utrecht as regent of his Spanish possessions. As such, he only communicated with the leadership of Aragon and Valencia via letter during the Revolt. Adrian visited Valencia once to assess the situation in 1519 but left concluding the problems could be solved amicably.

=== Diego Hurtado de Mendoza ===
Diego Hurtado de Mendoza, (1468–1536), the second son of Cardinal Mendoza and Mencia de Lemos was born and raised in the castle of Manzanares el Real. Mendoza was a veteran of the Reconquista and the Italian Wars; he distinguished himself in the taking of Melito, and was appointed Count of Mélito as a reward in 1506.

In 1520, he was appointed viceroy of Valencia, and went to the city of Valencia to rule. A Castilian, he proved a controversial choice, and he immediately provoked the residents of Valencia by siding with the nobles in refusing to seat the representatives elected by the people. His palace was attacked, but barely held after two hours of assault. Mendoza and the other nobles realized that the city was lost, and retreated the countryside. He raised an army, but was defeated by the army of the Germanies at the battle of Gandia on July 23, 1521. However, the rebellion was eventually defeated by other royalist-sympathetic generals, and he returned to the city of Valencia in November 1521. He acted with moderation toward the defeated, not seeking to cause another revolt. With the arrival of Germaine of Foix in 1523, however, punishment against the agermanats intensified until a pardon in December 1524.

=== Germaine of Foix ===
Germaine of Foix (1488–1538) was a French princess and Ferdinand II of Aragon's second wife. Her son conceived by Ferdinand, the Infante Juan, died shortly after childbirth in 1509; The Hidden would later claim to be Juan come back to reclaim his kingdom against the foreign usurpers, as if Juan had lived, he would have inherited the Crown of Aragon rather than Charles.

Germaine left for Germany with her step-grandson Charles in 1520, and there she was married to the German margrave Johann of Brandenburg-Ansbach. She only returned to Spain in 1523, when she was appointed Viceroy of Valencia, replacing Diego Hurtado de Mendoza. She favored a harsher policy of repression against the rebels, but also was the one to sign the pardon ending the repression in December 1524.

=== Other royalists ===
- Cardinal Adrian, Regent of Charles' Spanish dominions. Adrian was occupied in Castile, however, and spent little time in Valencia.
- Duke of Segorbe, commander of the royalist armies at the battles of Orpesa and Almenara, two royal victories.
- Pedro Fajardo de Zúñiga y Requesens, Marquis of Los Vélez, commander of the royalist armies at the Battle of Oriola, the decisive royalist victory of the war.

== Agermanats ==
The agermanats (Spanish: agermandos) were members of the Germanies and later, as the revolt expanded, anyone who sided with the rebels rather than only actual guild members.

=== Joan Llorenç ===
Joan Llorenç (Spanish: Juan Llorens) (1458–1520) was one of the most important leaders of the Germanies during the first phase of the revolt, when warfare had not yet broken out. Llorenç sought to expand the role the guilds played in the city and to counterbalance noble power. The nobility were widely disliked as they had often abused their power and acted above the law, with the government doing little against them. Llorenç and the Council of Thirteen practically ran the city of Valencia until the new viceroy, Diego Hurtado de Mendoza, arrived. One of the compromises that Llorenç tried to broker was the addition of two representatives to the governing council of Valencia elected by the people. The two candidates affiliated with the Germanies won, while all candidates supported by the nobles lost. Afterward, the nobility refused to admit the Germanies representatives, and the new Viceroy backed them. This, and the death of the popular Guillén Castleví (known under the nickname "Sorolla") caused riots in the city that ended the royal administration. Llorenç did not live long enough to see guide the continuing revolt, as he died in 1520.

=== Vicente Peris ===
Vicente Peris (1478–1522) was a radical leader of the revolt who came to prominence after the death of Joan Llorenç. Peris saw the revolution as a wider social revolution against the nobility, and aggressively attacked them. He also legitimized the anti-Muslim stance of many rebels into the Germanies government, and intensified their repression.

Peris obtained two great initial military successes. He conquered the castle of Xàtiva on July 14, 1521 and then defeated the forces of Viceroy Diego Hurtado de Mendoza at the battle of Gandia, on July 23 a week later. Under his command, the agermanats looted the town and farmland of the Gandia region, and undertook a campaign of forced baptisms upon all the Muslims of the Safor.

However, Peris was unable to control dissent and disagreement about the next course of action among the Germanies. The royal government won a great victory at the Battle of Oriola. Peris remained fortified at Xàtiva's castle for half a year, waiting in vain for the situation to improve. On the night of February 18, 1522, Peris returned to the city of Valencia hoping to reignite the rebellion, but was captured by the royalist troops after a night battle. He was executed on March 3, 1522.

=== The Hidden ===
The Hidden (Catalan: L'Encobert, Spanish: El Encubierto, "The Hidden/Shrouded [One]") (d. 1522) was the mysterious and charismatic leader of the remnants of the agermanats in the third phase of the revolt in 1522. Also called "The Hidden King" (Catalan: El Rei Encobert, Spanish: El Rey Encubierto), he claimed to be a prince hidden for his own safety now showing himself to save Spain from ruin. His true name is unknown.

Several versions, all quite dubious to modern historians, exist for his origin. According to the claims and rumors circulated by his supporters, he was raised in Gibraltar by a shepherd, hidden by Archbishop Cisneros for the country's own good and unaware of his true nature as a great noble of some kind. Several versions of his claim existed. In one version, he was Prince Juan, the son of Ferdinand and his second wife Germaine who died at birth; this would make him the true ruler of Aragon (if not Castile). For this to be correct, however, The Hidden would have been 12 years old when he joined the revolt, as Prince Juan was born and died in 1509. Slightly more plausible was the claim that he was the (officially) stillborn child of John of Castile and Margaret of Austria. John was another child of Ferdinand and Isabella's, and furthermore older than his sister Joanna and male, which would have made The Hidden Charles I's cousin and the true successor to the throne, as Charles descended from Joanna's claim. According to the government, he was actually a Jewish trickster returning from exile in Oran to stir up trouble.

Under The Hidden, the revolt emphasized Valencian sovereignty rather than the widespread revolution that Peris had. He attracted support and recruited from local country elites, leaders, and rich farmers. In this phase, the Germanies area of action limited itself to the Horta of Valencia, Alzira, and Xàtiva. Farms were looted, castles assaulted, and any Muslims in their domain were forced to convert.

Realizing that the revolt had not yet been solved, the royalist government placed a gigantic bounty on the head of The Hidden. Sure enough, he was murdered by two of his supporters eager for money in Burjassot on May 19, 1522. Many others soon sprang up claiming to be The Hidden, but none proved charismatic enough to take over leadership of the Germanies.

=== Other agermanats ===
- Guillén Castleví (known under the nickname "Sorolla"), a member of the Council of Thirteen whose reported death in the attack on the Viceroy's palace enraged the city.
- Jaime Ros, the commander of the rebels at the battles of Orpesa and Almenara, two royal victories.
