= L'Encobert =

- Born: Unknown
- Died: 1522; Burjassot, Spain
- Cause of death: murder

The Hidden (Catalan: L'Encobert, Spanish: El Encubierto, "The Hidden/Shrouded [One]") (d. 1522) was a mysterious and charismatic leader of the remnants of the rebels in the last stages of the Revolt of the Brotherhoods in the Kingdom of Valencia, then under the rule of the Crown of Aragon. Also called "The Hidden King" (Catalan: El Rei Encobert, Spanish: El Rey Encubierto), he claimed to be a prince hidden for his own safety now showing himself by divine command to save Spain from ruin. The Hidden unified the rebels for a short period, inspiring messianic fervor among his followers. He led them on hit-and-run raids against the royal government, uncooperative nobles, and Muslim peasants (mudéjars). The Hidden was killed in Burjassot on May 18, 1522, and the rebellion soon collapsed afterward. His true name and lineage are unknown.

== Problems of historiography ==
Little is known conclusively about The Hidden. Even the exact nature of claims about him are disputed, as it is nearly impossible to tell how much truth is to the government-approved unfavorable stories of him that predominated after the fact. Some influential versions of the tale were written by authors likely more interested in a gripping story rather than historical accuracy. Many of the claims are wholly contradictory. As such, it is difficult to tell whether particular elements in The Hidden's legend come from fact, claims The Hidden made directly himself, rumors spread by The Hidden's supporters, or stories spread by the government.

Some of the most reliable testimony about the actual beliefs of the Hidden and his followers comes from the Spanish Inquisition. The Inquisition arrested and questioned various members of the revolt for heresy, and recorded their answers. These answers give an idea of what actual supporters of The Hidden thought, as opposed to claims the government made later about the motives of The Hidden and the rebels.

== Origin stories ==
According to one account, The Hidden was raised in Gibraltar by a shepherd, hidden by Archbishop Cisneros for the country's own good and unaware of his true nature as a great noble of some kind. In a divine vision, his true nature was revealed to him by the prophets Elijah and Enoch, and he was directed to restore Spain from its current fallen state.

The exact nature of his royal claim also has several tellings. In one version, he was Prince Juan, the son of Ferdinand of Aragon and his second wife Germaine of Foix who died at birth; this would make him the true ruler of the Crown of Aragon (if not Castile). For this to be correct, however, The Hidden would have been 12 years old when he joined the revolt, as Prince Juan was born and died in 1509. Slightly more plausible was the claim that he was the (officially) stillborn child of John of Castile and Margaret of Austria. John was another child of Ferdinand and Isabella's, and furthermore older than his sister Joanna and male, which would have made The Hidden Charles I's cousin and the true successor to the throne, as Charles descended from Joanna's claim. In an alternate version from Martín Viciana, it was the disliked Cardinal Mendoza (the Viceroy's father) who had hidden the prince away for evil reasons, rather than the popular Archbishop Cisneros performing the deed for noble ones.

According to a story circulated by Miquel Garcia, who bore little love for The Hidden, he was actually a Jewish trickster born in Castile. The Hidden, along with the other Jews of Spain, were exiled, and he came to live in Oran in North Africa. There he served a rich and possibly also Jewish merchant named Juan Bilbao, who had accompanied him to Oran. The Hidden then seduced both his master's wife and daughter. He may have also converted to Christianity as well, but treacherously and only for the purpose of getting closer to Bilbao's wife. Bilbao proceeded to serve the governor of Oran for a time, where The Hidden astonished him with his villainy. The Hidden was arrested, and whipped publicly. He left Oran for Valencia then, taking on a new identity and living as a hermit for a time before seeing his chance to raise more trouble by unifying the rebellion and pushing it onward. Very few of the contemporary accounts have any reference to him being a Jew or converso, however. This account also has some temporal issues, as most sources agree that The Hidden was youngish (from 20–25 years old). The Jews were exiled in 1492, 30 years prior to The Hidden's entry to Valencia, so for this account to be true either The Hidden wore his years very well, or he stayed in Castile for longer than he legally was allowed.

=== Name ===
In general, The Hidden was known simply as L'Encobert in Catalan, translated as El Encubierto in Castilian Spanish due to him being "hidden" after his birth. However, the variant "The Hidden King" also existed as his title. Historian Sara Nalle claims that "The Hidden King" was only used by later governmental chroniclers who in her view fundamentally misunderstood him. Since the first phases of the Revolt of the Brotherhoods had been an attempt to replace the government with a new one, the later chronicles assumed The Hidden had meant the same thing, hence the emphasis on the royal descent part of his legend and "The Hidden King." According to Nalle, the Valencian supporters of The Hidden saw him more as a messianic religious prophet, and not so much a governmental leader, and hence called him solely "The Hidden."

The Hidden, in his first major speech in Xàtiva, also offered two other names for himself. He said he could be called "Brother" (a term with Messianic connotations at the time) or "the man with the sailor's cape," as he was wearing such a cape at the time.

=== Physical description ===
The main physical description of The Hidden is from Martín Viciana, a biographer admittedly unfavorable to The Hidden. According to him, The Hidden was of moderate stature, had a reddish beard, chestnut-colored hair, aquiline nose, blue eyes, short and thick hands, large feet, had a small mouth, and was bow-legged. He spoke excellent Castilian in a courtly style. In his account, Viciana does not mention the story that The Hidden was a secret Jew and his description contrasts with the normal stereotype of a Sephardic Jew. Nalle believes that this description was an intentionally unflattering one, in contrast with a prophesied savior whom The Hidden had successfully presented himself to be.

At first The Hidden dressed moderately, but as he gained prestige among the rebels he dressed in a red velvet tunic, red silk stockings, a velvet cap, and bore a gilded sword. He always traveled on his personal horse, a small colt.

== Activity in the Revolt of the Brotherhoods ==
=== Background ===
From 1519–1521, the Revolt of the Brotherhoods raged. However, at the close of 1521, it seemed as if the revolt was in its last throes. The city of Valencia had fallen to the royal government, and most of the organized armies of the rebellion had disbanded. Vicent Peris maintained Xàtiva and its castle for the rebels, but in February Peris was captured trying to instigate a new revolt in Valencia. Rebel support still simmered through Valencia, but it now lacked a leader.

=== Taking command of the agermanats ===
The Hidden came to prominence with an explosive sermon he gave on March 22, 1522, in the town of Xàtiva. He explained his story about meeting the prophets Enoch and Elijah and how he had been directed to save Valencia, restore the Holy Land, and care for the poor. He also said that he needed to discuss matters with King Charles. Shortly afterward, he gave another sermon to a gigantic crowd in Alzira. These two towns would be the base of his support. Xàtiva had fallen to royal troops in early March, but now was contested once again by The Hidden's renewed rebellion in the city.

Under The Hidden, the revolt emphasized Valencian sovereignty rather than the widespread revolution that Vicent Peris had aimed for. He attracted support and recruits from local country elites, leaders, and rich farmers. Under his direction, money and property were impounded from clerics and nobles who opposed him. He also began rebuilding the armies of the agermanats (members of the Germanies (guilds), though now a term for any rebel), though they still remained small compared to their former sizes. Farms were looted, noble holdings assaulted, and any Muslims in their domain were forced to convert. The mountainous terrain of southern Valencia was well-suited for guerrilla warfare, and the raiding bands of rebels were difficult to locate by the royal armies. In an ambush set in Xàtiva itself, the rebels wounded the Duke of Gandia and the Count of Oliva, though The Hidden was hurt himself in the battle. According to royalist sympathetic sources, The Hidden was not valorous in the skirmishes he led nor was overly effective in battle.

=== Death ===
The Germanies powerbase was now in the countryside, but The Hidden sought to eventually retake the city of Valencia. As such, he ventured to the outskirts of the city of Valencia on some recruiting missions to raise support for the rebellion. On May 18, he visited the town of Burjassot with some fifteen supporters, distinguished by their white shirts. The previous night, the royal government had raised the alert and closed the gates to Valencia. According to some accounts, The Hidden sought to arrange the assassination of the Marquis of Zenete, the brother of Viceroy Mendoza. However, the royal government had set a considerable bounty on his head. While The Hidden was talking with a former captain of the Germanies army, some seven men rode in and, without dismounting, chopped off The Hidden's head. His remains were taken to Valencia, and his head hosted upon the city gates with those of other traitors. The rest of his body was handed over to the Inquisition, where he was posthumously tried for heresy. He was convicted and his body was burned.

=== Supernatural events, prophecies, and theology ===
One fact that most accounts agree on is that The Hidden claimed that Elijah and Enoch had given him his divine mandate to lead the rebellion. After that, stories are less consistent; based on this, Nalle believes that only the story of the two prophets was claimed by The Hidden himself. It seems likely that The Hidden was familiar with the book De La Venguda Del Antichrist ("Of the Coming of the Antichrist"), a book by John Alamany republished in Valencia in 1520. According to Venguda Del Antichrist, a Messiah would soon come who would lead a new Crusade to the Holy Land, annihilate the Muslims, and do battle with the Antichrist as predicted in the Book of Revelation. While not referencing the book directly, The Hidden tapped into the beliefs contained in it which had wide acceptance in Valencia at the time and presented himself as the prophesied savior. There had already existed a belief that Enoch and Elijah lived in a paradise on earth and would fight the Antichrist in Rome, which also tied into his story of meeting them. From his supporters, a variety of holy visions and powers were granted to him. He was said to be the new Messiah, or an angel in human form. He was said to be invulnerable unless he was in Jerusalem, which he was fated to reconquer. Another account said that he levitated into the air while praying.

The Hidden also propounded a four-sided Trinity, with Four Religions and Four Judgments. This was similar to Joachism, whose teachings had spread throughout Valencia. According to older sources, his view of the four-element "Trinity" was Father, Son, Holy Ghost, and Holy Sacrament. According to royalist sources, he claimed that the Devil was the fourth element. The Devil was the first son of God, and Jesus only the second. In these sources, his theology was largely inspired by translations of Greek philosophers and Gnostics that the Moors had made while they controlled Iberia.

== Later influence ==
The revolt continued at a low-level after The Hidden's death, with several new claimants taking up The Hidden's name. None of them proved as charismatic as the original, and warfare in Valencia had largely stopped by the end of 1522.

The Hidden was referenced in various histories and light tales afterward, often romanticized heavily. These stories became some of the main records of The Hidden's life despite their unreliability due to the paucity of official records kept and the government's desire to suppress the memory of the revolt. Much later, in the 19th century, the story received a burst of popularity again as it was used by Valencian writers and intellectuals to support their desire for autonomy from Spain. The treatment was again more romantic than historical. Examples include Vicente Boix's El encubierto de Valencia.

== See also ==
- Sebastianism
- Al-Muqanna, the "Veiled One"
