= Joan Llorenç =

Joan Llorenç (in Valencian; in Spanish: Juan Llorens) (1458–1520) was the leader of a Germania (guild, literally "brotherhood") of Valencia. He became one of the most influential leaders in what would later be known as the Revolt of the Brotherhoods, though during his leadership warfare had not yet broken out.

== Biography ==
Llorenç sought to expand the role the guilds played in the city and to counterbalance noble power. The nobility were widely disliked as they had often abused their power and acted above the law, with the government doing little against them. After a series of plagues, floods, and economic disasters in Valencia, the royal government was practically nonfunctional.
Llorenç and the Council of Thirteen, the board consisting of the heads of the thirteen Germanies (Brotherhoods), practically ran the city while the official government was absent or powerless. One of the compromises that Llorenç tried to broker was the addition of two representatives to the governing council of Valencia elected by the people. The two candidates affiliated with the Germanies won, while all candidates supported by the nobles lost.
However, the recently appointed Viceroy Diego Hurtado de Mendoza sided with the nobility and refused to admit the Germanies representatives. This, and the violent death of the popular Guillén Castleví (known under the nickname "Sorolla"), caused riots in the city that ended the royal administration. Llorenç did not live long enough to guide the continuing revolt, as he died shortly after the riots, likely due to a heart attack.

Upon his death, the moderate nature of the revolt was replaced by a more radical and bellicose one, led by Vicent Peris. In this process, the revolt underwent an ideological evolution, shifting from a political and commercial demand by the local bourgeoisie to a violent class revolution widespread throughout the Kingdom of Valencia.
