= Boix =

Boix (Eastern Catalan: [boʃ]) is a Catalan surname, literally meaning "box", often referring to the plant genus Buxus.

== People with the name ==
- Carles Boix (born 1962), Spanish political scientist
- Emili Boix-Fuster (born 1956), Spanish sociolinguist
- Francisco Boix (1920–1951), Spanish photographer
- Leo Boix, Argentine-British poet, translator, journalist
- Montserrat Boix (born 1960), Spanish journalist
- Vicente Boix (1813–1880), Spanish playwright, poet, and historian
