= Siege of Alzira =

Coordinates: 39.1500°N 0.4333°W

- Part of Revolt of the Brotherhoods
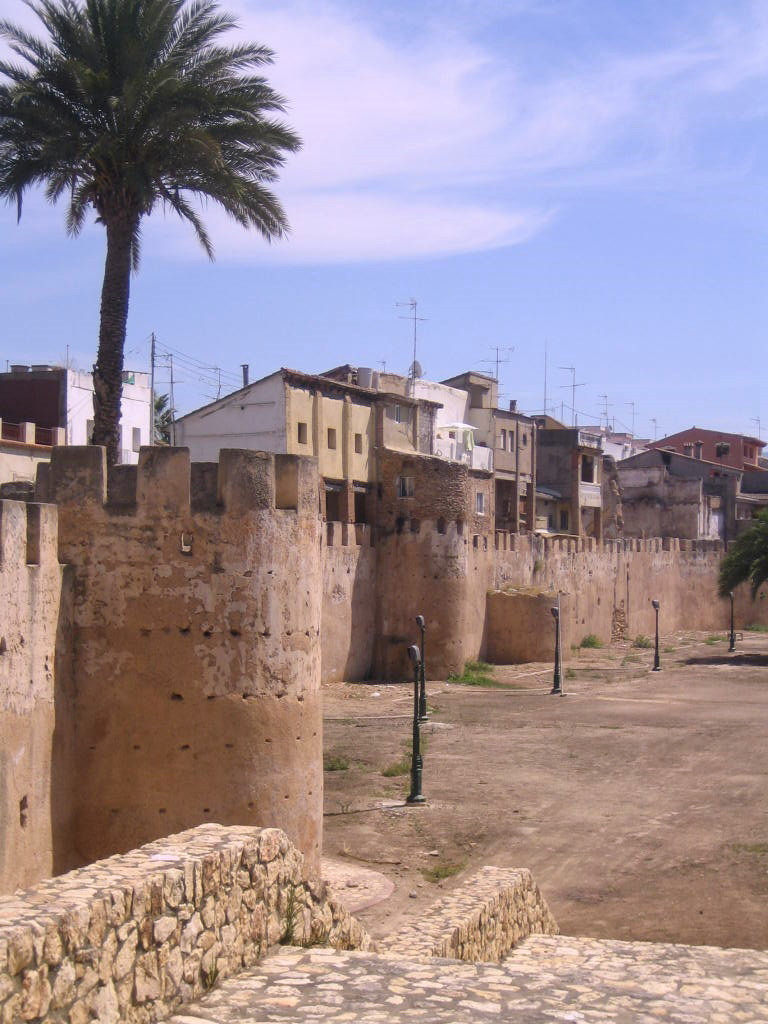
- Walls of Alzira.
Date	Autumn 1521 - December 1522
Location	Alzira, Kingdom of Valencia (Spain)
Result	Royalist victory

Belligerents
Agermanados	Royalists

Commanders and leaders
	Diego Hurtado de Mendoza

Strength
unknown	8,000 soldiers

The Siege of Alzira took place between 1521 and 1522, as viceroy Diego Hurtado de Mendoza, 1st Count of Melito, attempted to subjugate Alzira and end the Revolt of the Brotherhoods.

== The Siege ==
After a crushing defeat at the Battle of Oriola (1521), the Brotherhood Army collapsed and the Royal army reoccupied the Kingdom of Valencia. Only Xàtiva and Alzira remained under Brotherhood control.

With Valencia subdued, the Royal army with more than 8,000 men started the Siege of Alzira after managing to cross the river, an operation that lasted three days. But after a month it had to abandon the siege, as 3,000 Agermanados arrived from Xàtiva to help the besieged.
Only on 9 December 1522, both towns, the last strongholds of the Brotherhoods in the Valencian Country, capitulated.
