= Germanies =

Germanies may refer to:

- Germany while it was divided into multiple states; notable possibilities include:
  - West Germany (FRG) and East Germany (GDR), the division of Germany from 1949–1990.
  - Allied Occupation Zones in Germany, the division of Germany after World War II from 1945–1949.
  - Kleindeutschland and Großdeutschland ("Little Germany" and "Big Germany"), two competing ideas for unifying German-speaking lands in the 19th century.
  - German Confederation, the loose organization of independent German-speaking states after the Napoleonic wars from 1815–1866.
  - List of states in the Holy Roman Empire, the many Germanic states of the Holy Roman Empire from 1200–1800.
- Germania (guild) (plural: Germanies, "Brotherhoods"), artisan guilds in the Kingdom of Valencia.
  - Revolt of the Brotherhoods (Catalan: Revolta de les Germanies), a revolt in Valencia from 1519–1523.
