= Revolt of the Brotherhoods =

16th century guild uprising in Spain

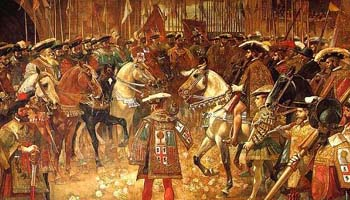
- La pau de les Germanies, by Marcelino de Unceta.
Date	1520–1521
Location	Kingdom of Valencia
Result	Royalist victory

Belligerents
Brotherhood rebels	Royalists

Commanders and leaders
Joan Llorenç; Vicent Peris (executed); L'Encobert (executed)	Charles V; Diego Hurtado de Mendoza; Alonso de Aragón; Pedro Fajardo

The Revolt of the Brotherhoods (Catalan: Revolta de les Germanies, Spanish: Rebelión de las Germanías) was a revolt by artisan guilds (Germanies) against the government of King Charles V in the Kingdom of Valencia, part of the Crown of Aragon. It took place in 1519–1523, with most of the fighting occurring during 1521. The Valencian revolt inspired a related revolt in the island of Mallorca, also part of Aragon, which lasted in 1521–1523.

The revolt was an anti-monarchist, anti-feudal autonomist movement inspired by the Italian republics. It also bore a strong anti-Islamic aspect, as rebels rioted against Valencia's peasant Muslim population (also called mudéjars, to contrast with crypto-Muslims or Moriscos in the Crown of Castile, where Islam was outlawed) and imposed forced conversions to Christianity. The agermanats are comparable to the comuneros of neighboring Castile, who fought a similar revolt against Charles in 1520–1522. Both rebellions were partially inspired by the departure for Germany of Charles, the new King of both Castile and Aragon (in a personal union that would form the basis for the Kingdom of Spain), to take the throne as Holy Roman Emperor and leaving behind a somewhat disreputable Royal Council and regent.

== Origins ==
=== Economic troubles and pirate raids ===
Valencia was dealing with a variety of problems in the early 16th century. In King Ferdinand II's later years as ruler, the government slowly decayed and became more corrupt. The economy in Aragon was not as vibrant as in Andalusia, as it was more based on agriculture and less on the lucrative maritime trade. Valencia's economy was dominated by two somewhat static factions: the landed nobles, who controlled agriculture and the countryside, and the Germanies (guilds), which controlled light manufacturing, crafts, and the cities. Outbreaks of famine, flood, and plague impeded the economy still further.

However, the most imminent threat to the country was that of warfare. Ferdinand pursued an ambitious foreign policy, participating in the Italian Wars and invading Navarre in 1512 during a war against France. This stretched the finances of Aragon and Castile to their limit. Spanish relations with Muslim nations and North Africa were still exceedingly poor after the Reconquista, and the coast of Aragon was constantly raided by Barbary pirates. Revolt of the oppressed Muslim-convert population in the recently conquered Granada was also a concern. Royal troops were required to be stationed in Granada and Navarre to maintain order. In order to maintain a coastal defense against the pirates without the cost of deploying the army, Ferdinand gave the Germanies permission to arm themselves and form their own paramilitary brigades. The local nobles did not approve of this and initially tried to prevent the Germanies from arming, fearful of the consequences of an armed citizenry.

=== Succession of Charles I ===
Ferdinand died in January 1516 and was succeeded by his mentally unstable daughter Joanna. Within a few weeks, her son proclaimed himself her co-ruler as King Charles I of Castile and Aragon. Charles had been raised in the Netherlands and his affairs were mostly controlled by the Flemish noble William de Croÿ, sieur de Chièvres. In 1517, the seventeen-year-old King sailed to Castile, where he was formally recognised as King of Castile. There, his Flemish court provoked much scandal, as de Croÿ shamelessly sold government privileges for personal money and installed other Flemish nobles into government offices. In May 1518, Charles traveled to Barcelona in Aragon, where he would remain for nearly two years. Here, he haggled with Aragon's slightly stronger cortes, the Generalitat, for privileges and his formal recognition as King of Aragon. Aragon managed to maintain more local control than Castile did, but mostly because Aragon was poorer and there was no point in pressing the issue for extra tax money that was not there to be collected.

In 1519, the King's paternal grandfather, Holy Roman Emperor Maximilian I, died. Charles competed with King Francis I of France to win the imperial election by aggressively bribing prince-electors. Charles won, becoming Emperor Charles V. He left Aragon to return to Castile to raise funds to pay down the debts he had incurred in the election. The taxes granted to Charles at a Castilian cortes in A Coruña would help spark the Revolt of the Comuneros of Castile. Of more importance for Aragon, in the summer of 1519 Charles granted his permission to the Germanies to arm themselves against the raiding Muslim fleets. While permission had previously been granted under Ferdinand, Charles was able to force the Valencian nobles to accept this decision.

== First phase, 1519: The Council of Thirteen in Valencia ==
In 1519, the plague struck Valencia. Several of the most important nobles died, and many of the others fled to the countryside. The superstitious population concluded that the disease was punishment for immorality, and rioted against people suspected of being homosexual as well as Muslims. The government tried to contain the rioters, but the rioters deposed the government instead. The Germanies stepped into this power vacuum, and gradually replaced the royal government of the capital of Valencia. The "Council of Thirteen" (Catalan: Junta dels Tretze, Spanish: Junta de los Trece), comprising one representative from each union, became the new government of the capital city. Joan Llorenç emerged as the leader and intellectual statesmen of the Germanies, and he sought a representative government similar to the Italian republics such as the Republic of Genoa. Llorenç and the Council of Thirteen gave power to the Germanies, who re-established their monopolies on their professions and forbade anyone to work who did not affiliate with one of the guilds.

King Charles I was in Aachen, Germany in 1520 where he was dealing with his coronation as Holy Roman Emperor. The only steps he took initially was to revoke his grant of arms to the Germanies and several other concessions, measures which were completely ignored. The tension increased with the nomination of the Castilian war veteran Diego Hurtado de Mendoza as viceroy in April 1520. At this point, the Germanies staged a coup d'état in which Mendoza was forced to flee and popular representatives replaced most of the remaining government functions and the courts. Councils of Thirteen took power in the other cities of Valencia as the revolt spread. With this, what had previously been a quiet assertion of power became a civil war.

== Second phase, 1520–1521: War ==
The moderate Joan Llorenç died in 1520, and was replaced by Vicent Peris. The death of Llorenç robbed the moderate faction (including Caro, Sorolla, and Montfort), concerned with the good governance of Valencia, of its strongest voice; the radical faction took power (including Urgellés, Estellés, Peris, and Borrell) which sought land reform and a social revolution to reduce the power of the aristocracy. Peris took an extremely aggressive stand toward both the nobles and the Muslims.

In the summer of 1520, some military actions occurred such as an assault on the viscounty of Xelva, the pillage of noble palaces, and the redistribution of nearby land. The Moorish quarters of the city of Valencia were attacked and burned after an accusation of collaboration with the nobility. However, the war did not truly expand until June 1521. The royalists were separated into two groups. In the south, the viceroy personally led a force based out of Denia. Andalusian nobles sent an army to assist as well, headed by Pedro Fajardo, 1st Marquis of los Vélez. In the north, Alonso de Aragon, the Duke of Segorbe, captained a force. The Germanies took over several cities at once: in the north, the regions of the Maestrat and Camp de Morvedre; and in the south, in Alzira, Xàtiva, Gandia, and Elx.

In the north, the Agermanats led by Jaime Ros suffered two defeats in short succession, first in the Batlle of Oropesa and afterwards in the Battle of Almenara. The southern front saw more success, as the rebels commanded by Vicent Peris took the castle of Xàtiva and won an important victory in the Battle of Gandia against the personal troops of the Viceroy on July 23, 1521. After the battle, the Agermanats looted the town and farmland of the Gandia region, and undertook a campaign of forced baptisms upon all the Muslims of the Safor.

After this quick succession of battles, the leadership of the Germanies fell into disarray. The Valencian bourgeoisie favored some form of negotiated exit, while the military leaders urged the Germanies to fight on. Distracted by internal disputes, the Agermanats suffered a crushing defeat a mere week after their victory at Gandia in the Battle of Oriola. The Marquis of Los Vélez commanded the victorious royal army manned with reinforcements from Andalusia, and approximately 4,000 Agermanats were killed. Almost all of the south of the Kingdom of Valencia fell back into Royalist hands. The Council of Thirteen resigned, and three months later, on November 1, the City of Valencia surrendered to the Royalist army.

== Third phase, 1522: Countryside Marauders ==
Vicent Peris, after holing up in the secure fort at Xàtiva for some months, came back to Valencia on the night of February 18, 1522. He hoped to revive the Germanies and respark the revolt. Meeting with his supporters, he was somehow seen or betrayed, and a desperate night battle in the streets broke out between the Agermanats and Royalist soldiers. Eventually, Peris was cornered and smoked out by setting his house on fire. He was arrested, and on March 3, 1522, he was executed along with his closest supporters by drawing and quartering.

Only Xàtiva and Alzira remained under the control of the Germanies. A mysterious new leader emerged for the Germanies, calling himself "The Hidden" (Catalan: L'Encobert, Spanish: El Encubierto, "The Hidden/Shrouded [One]"). The historical record is unclear, but The Hidden claimed to be a prince — sources differ on who his claimed parents were — hidden away in his childhood who had a mystical vision of the prophets Elijah and Enoch. He was told of his true heritage and that he must save Valencia. The Hidden emphasized a more religious and messianic revolt rather than the social revolution that Peris promoted. He attracted support and recruited from local country elites, leaders, and rich farmers. In this phase, the Germanies area of action limited itself to the Horta of Valencia, Alzira, and Xàtiva. Farms were looted, castles assaulted, and any Muslims in their domain were forced to convert.

Realizing that the revolt had not yet been quashed, the royalist government placed a large bounty on the head of The Hidden. He was killed by assailants eager for money in Burjassot on May 19, 1522. Many others soon sprang up claiming to be The Hidden, but none proved charismatic enough to take over leadership of the Germanies. Viceroy Mendoza also advocated a policy of conciliation, offering generous terms to those who surrendered and agreed to return to royal governance. In December 1522, the strongholds of Xàtiva and Alzira fell, which ended the Revolt of the Germanies in Valencia conclusively.

== Germanies of Majorca, 1521–1523 ==
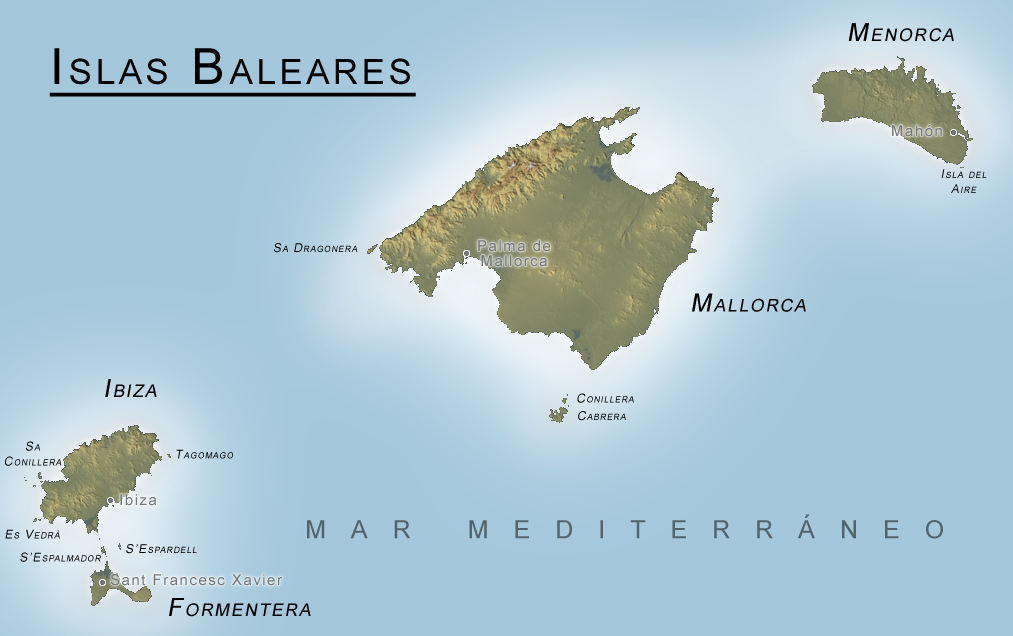
Ibiza stayed loyal to the royal government, while almost all of Mallorca on this map) was controlled by the agermanats.

The revolt was known in other realms of Aragon, and inspired a new overthrow of the government in the Kingdom of Majorca after the unpopular imprisonment of seven guild members. As in Valencia, a Council of Thirteen was constituted to rule, led by Juan Crespí. The rebels gained control of the capital and dismissed the governor-general, Miguel de Gurrea, who fled to Ibiza. The nobles who survived the massacre that occurred in the Bellver Castle took refuge in Alcúdia, the only part of the island that remained faithful to the King during the year and a half the Germanies ruled Majorca.

During this period, the Council of Thirteen ran an independent government, and did not coordinate with their brethren in Valencia. In August 1522, the emperor sent 800 men to help Gurrea. By the next year, they had taken the capital, and on March 8, 1523, the Agermanats surrendered with the mediation of the bishop. Despite his mediation, more than 200 Agermanats were executed, and many others fled.

== Aftermath ==
=== Forced conversion of the Muslims ===
The Muslims of the Kingdom of Valencia suffered for a variety of reasons. The warfare with Muslim corsairs kept tensions high between the religions, and encouraged a hostile mentality. Former Muslims (Moriscos) were still a problem in conquered Granada, causing those in Valencia to have little sympathy. Economic reasons existed as well. The nobles used the poorer Muslims as a cheap labor supply, which encouraged friction between them and lowly paid or unemployed Christians jealous of their jobs and annoyed at their effect on wages. The noble manors competed with the guilds for economic dominance, and thus the Muslims were seen as part of the opposing system. Lastly, some utopian agermanats believed in a universal brotherhood of all Christian peoples, and that conversion of all the Muslims would assuredly save both their souls and their children's souls.

The forced conversion of the Muslims reached its height in the summer of 1521, after the victory at Gandia. Once the revolt had been defeated, the noblemen questioned the validity of these obligatory baptisms. In order to make a decision, Emperor Charles summoned a board of theologians and jurists in Madrid. In 1525 this board spoke in favor of sustaining the Christian faith of the new converts, since they had not been forced into the baptism. The baptism was freely chosen as an alternative to death; only if the baptism had been imposed with no choice at all would it have been invalid.

This decision provoked two uprisings from the recently converted population, one in Benaguasil in November 1525 and another in Sierra de Espadán in Castellón in March 1526. This decision ended the Muslim exception of the mudéjars in the country, but began the problem of Moriscos in Valencia whose Christian faith was, understandably, insincere.

=== Repression of the Germanies ===
With the fall of Valencia and the entry of the viceroy into the city in late 1521, a moderate repression started. Viceroy Diego Hurtado de Mendoza did not wish to start a new revolt, but took action against the most important of the leaders, and issued a general pardon to minor Agermanats who had merely served in the army.

However, Mendoza was replaced as viceroy by Germaine of Foix, Ferdinand's second wife, who returned to the country with Charles and her new German husband Johann of Brandenburg-Ansbach, who was jointly named a viceroy with her. She favored a harsher policy toward the rebels, and approximately 800 death sentences to former rebels would be dispensed. Sources differ on how much she personally ordered, but it seems likely at least 100 death warrants were directly approved of by her. Heavy fines were imposed on the guilds as punishment, as well as a total of more than 360,000 ducats of fines to all cities that had sided with the Germanies, and 2,000,000 ducats of fines were levied in compensations for damages sustained by properties during the war.

The period of heavier repression ended on December 23, 1524, when Germaine signed a pardon for one of the six main guilds of the City of Valencia and by extension the other Germanies. King Charles signed an additional general pardon in 1528, suggesting that scattered reprisals might have continued afterward. Germaine was in favor of the integration of Spain, and Valencian nationalists point to her pardon as one of the first official documents in Aragon written in Castilian Spanish.

== Later influence ==
The Revolt's failure is often seen as a political catalyst for Valencia's shift to a modern, centralized, and authoritarian state away from a feudal one. The local nobility were weakened, and needed to call upon Royal power to defeat the rebels. The conversion of the Muslims shrank the pool of cheap labor that the noblemen had relied upon. And though the timing may be a coincidence, Germaine's appearance in Valencia helped weaken the old nobility and reinforce Royal power in Valencia.

A later uprising in 1693 was partially inspired by the Revolt of the Germanies and took their name from it. The rebels called themselves the Segona Germania (Second Brotherhood) and demanded exemption from high feudal rents and duties. This revolt was quickly suppressed by the Spanish government with only a small amount of bloodshed. Despite taking on the name, the revolt was quite different in origin; the Second Brotherhood was mostly made up of peasants rather than the middle-class guildsmen of the 1519–1523 revolt, and lacked the anti-Muslim aspect of the original rebellion.

== See also ==
- Second Brotherhood
- Expulsion of the Moriscos
