= Second Brotherhood =

17th century uprising

The Second Brotherhood (Catalan: Segona Germania) was an uprising in the central regions of the Kingdom of Valencia of Habsburg Spain in 1693. The protesters named themselves agermanats after the germanies ("brotherhoods") or guilds of Valencia who had revolted in 1519 in the Revolt of the Brotherhoods, but the two revolts are quite different in their supporters and the social context in which they occurred. Rather than a revolt by middle-class guildsmen, the Second Brotherhood was a peasant revolt against high rents on farmland and crops. Additionally, the Second Brotherhood was resolved far faster and far more peaceably than the violence of the 1519 revolt in both the rebels' actions and the government's subsequent repression.

== Background ==
One of the major causes behind the first revolt was public distrust and hatred of the Moriscos. However, at the beginning of the 17th century King Phillip III expelled them all. This removed the original motive for a revolt, but wrecked the economy of Valencia for two generations. Only by late 17th century was the area beginning to recover economically. Still, this return to prosperity brought several revolts by peasants concerned with their lack of benefit from the growing wealth of their lords. These included revolts in Horta (Huerta) in 1663, Valldigna in 1672, and Camp de Morvedre in 1689.

== Rent protests and peasant discontent ==
At the beginning of 1693 the Duke of Gandía and other noblemen went to Madrid in order to complain of the reluctance of its vassals to pay Sunday rents. They also complained of Fèlix Vilanova, who had already participated as an instigator of the revolt at Camp de Morvedre in 1689. Felix seemed to be provoking the peasants of the Marina Comarque by telling its noblemen that there were some documents and ancient privileges which exempted the peasants from paying them rents.

After a violent clash between protesters and the police in Pedreguer, the viceroy proposed to create a board of lawyers in Valencia where the legal arguments could be set forth. In this board the protesters alleged certain rights granted by James I and his successors, but they were not accepted for lack of documentary evidence. The protesters then asked directly for a complete cessation of the rents. The demand was made by Francesc Garcia, a well-to-do farmer and one of the main leaders of the protest movement, together with Feliu Rubio i Bartomeu Pelegrí.

As May arrived, the peasants refused to pay the rents due. In Carlet, the vassals of the Earl of Carlet refused to pay. For the second time, the troops of the viceroy had to intervene to bring the protesters to heel. Discontent spread.

== March of the protesters, and battle ==
In Vilallonga, in the Duchy of Gandia, four farmers who refused to split their crop with their lord were detained. This was the last provocation and the uprising began. The day after, three thousand men marched on the city of Gandia and the four persons under arrest were freed without any violence. This liberation, probably unexpected, encouraged to the rebels to continue their march and travel towards Valencia, where they would ask for justice to the viceroy. For effect, they improvised an army and formed battalions, organized by the well-to-do farmer of Muro d'Alcoi, Josep Navarro.

The viceroy, however, had been warned. He ordered the Governor of Xàtiva to join him in Gandia with an army of four hundred men on horseback, four hundred more on foot, and two pieces of artillery. They met him at Albaida, where they sought to join battle with the rebels whose force comprised the militias of Xàtiva, Algemesí, and Carcaixent.

The combat between both forces (1,397 armed men with artillery, against 1,500 practically unarmed peasants) took place on July 15 in Setla de Nunyes, near Muro d'Alcoi. The battle lasted two hours, and no more than fifteen people died – all of them agermanat rebels.

== Aftermath and repression ==
In the following weeks to the battle, cavalry squadrons restored order. Josep Navarro was executed as the leader of the army on February 29, 1694, and another twenty-five participants were condemned to galleys. Francesc Garcia, the most important leader of the rebels, was not captured. The most important leaders of the revolution were well-to-do peasants, while the enraged mass of people who followed were of the poorer social classes.

The Second Brotherhood reinforced the power of the state, and reinforced the centralization of government that had slowly happened over time. The noblemen saw again that they needed the help and protection of the royal forces, and that standing up for local rights would be unwise. The same disputes over rent amounts would continue to be argued, though generally in the judiciary. The Kingdom of Valencia would only last less than twenty years as an officially independent entity, as all Spain was formally unified after the War of the Spanish Succession in which Valencia and Aragon chose the losing side.

== See also ==
- Revolt of the Barretinas, a similar revolt in Catalonia from 1687–1689
