= Vicent Peris =

Spanish rebel (1478–1522)

Vicent Peris (1478–1522) (in Catalan; Spanish: Vicente Peris) was a weaver and leader of the weavers' guild (germania) in Valencia. He came to prominence as the most influential leader of the Council of Thirteen after the death of Joan Llorenç in the Revolt of the Brotherhoods. Peris saw the revolution as a wider social revolution against the nobility, and aggressively attacked them. He also legitimized the anti-Muslim stance of many rebels into the Germanies government, and intensified their repression.

== Leadership in the Revolt ==
Peris was born in Segorbe. He was a member of the Council of Thirteen which came to contest the royal government's rule of Valencia in 1519. In 1520, the situation worsened with the appointment of Castilian Viceroy Diego Hurtado de Mendoza. A riot broke out after Mendoza refused to recognize the election of officials who were sympathetic to the Germanies, and in the chaos the popular "Sorolla" (Guillén Castleví) was killed. During the chaos, Peris led the city's mobs and militias against royal forces. The Viceroy was forced to flee the city, and shortly thereafter Joan Llorenç died, likely of a heart attack. With the death of Sorolla and Llorenç, Peris came to be known as the most powerful and influential member of the Council of Thirteen. Still, his support was not universal. Allegedly Llorenç, upon seeing Peris leading the mobs from his window, exclaimed "The Germania was made for none of this! You and others like you will be the ruination of Valencia." (That said, there is little evidence one way or the other for this quote.)

At first, the royal government was ill-prepared for warfare and the Germanies were able to expand with little opposition. The most influential nobles fortified themselves at the castle near Gandia, while the Germanies took over the other cities of the Kingdom of Valencia. To fund their army, the Germanies seized the property and goods of nobles who opposed them, and possibly those of the mudéjars (Muslims of Valencia) as well. Unsurprisingly, the Muslims joined the armies of the nobles in numbers in response. Mudéjars captured or found by the Germanies were forcibly baptized and converted to Christianity.

Peris obtained two important military successes. He conquered the castle of Xàtiva on July 14, 1521. A week later, he smashed the forces that Viceroy Mendoza had been gathering near Gandia at the Battle of Gandia on July 23. Under his command, the agermanats looted the town and farmland of the Gandia region, and undertook a campaign of forced baptisms upon all the Muslims of the conquered area. According to one account, after the Battle of Gandia Peris captured 2,000 Muslim prisoners who had sided with the Viceroy. He proceeded to baptize and then execute them all. When asked why, he (allegedly) said "Well, they gave many alms to Heaven, and much money to the purses of the agermanats."

However, Peris was unable to control dissent and disagreement about the next course of action among the Germanies. Additionally, in spite of Peris's success, nobles in neighboring Andalusia did not wish to see the rebellion fester and potentially grow to envelop their lands. Their forces first took Elche (Elx), then proceeded north. They won a great victory at the battle of Oriola on August 20, 1521.

== Return to Valencia and death ==
Peris remained fortified at Xàtiva's castle for half a year, waiting in vain for the situation to improve. Valencia fell on November 1, 1521. On the night of February 18, 1522, Peris returned to the city of Valencia hoping to reignite the rebellion. Meeting with his supporters, he was somehow seen or betrayed, and a desperate night battle in the streets broke out between the agermanats and royal soldiers. Eventually, Peris was cornered and smoked out by setting his house on fire. but was captured by the royalist troops after a desperate night battle in which 100 people died.

Peris was executed on March 3, 1522. Several others—nine survivors of the night battle, along with three other men and one woman—were hanged. Their bodies were paraded through the street, and Peris was then hung suspended by his feet. Peris's head was put into a cage and hung high upon Saint Vincent's gate so that those who entered the city might see his fate. His home was demolished, and the site sown with salt. It was forbidden to build a new building there, so the lot became a small public square unofficially named after him. By order of the Viceroy, his descendants were stigmatized as traitors to the patria (homeland) to the fourth generation, a punishment from the Book of Numbers.
