= Battle of Almenara =

Battle of Almenara may refer to:

- Battle of Almenara (1521), during the Revolt of the Brotherhoods
- Battle of Almenar (1710), also called Almenara, during the War of the Spanish Succession
