= Battle of Almenara (1521) =

Coordinates: 39°45′N 0°13′W

- Part of Revolt of the Brotherhoods
Date	18 July 1521
Location	Almenara, Castellón, Kingdom of Valencia (Spain)
Result	Royalist victory

Belligerents
Agermanados	Royalists

Commanders and leaders
Jaume Ros	Alfonso de Aragón y Portugal

Strength
± 6,000 infantrymen	less

Casualties and losses
± 2,000	Unknown

The Battle of Almenara was fought between the Agermanados (northern front) and the troops of Viceroy Diego Hurtado de Mendoza, on 18 July 1521, at Almenara (La Plana).

== The Battle ==
In the summer of 1521, Royalist troops, under command of the Duke of Segorbe, Alfonso de Aragón y Portugal, advanced into rebel-held territory. His army included not only Castilian infantry, but also Moorish soldiers, Catalan mercenaries and an important detachment of cavalry. The Agermanados army, commanded by Jaume Ros, lacked military training and possessed hardly any cavalry.
In a scorching heat, the Moorish troops attacked and intense fighting ensued, with neither side showing mercy. After three hours, the Catalan forces, which until then had remained in the rear, launched their attack led by Mossen Oliver. The Agermanados, greatly weakened by their encounter with the Moors, thirst, and exhaustion, retreated to a position where they were routed by the Duke's cavalry and the Catalans. No mercy was shown and many rebels were slaughtered.

The Battle of Almenara was the first defeat for the Agermanados on the northern front. Over 2,000 men died in the course of the battle.

The royalist forces occupied the area around Castellón de la Plana, making it their base of operations against La Plana and Onda.
