= Brotherhoods of Mallorca =

Revolt of the Brotherhoods of Mallorca
- Part of Revolt of the Brotherhoods
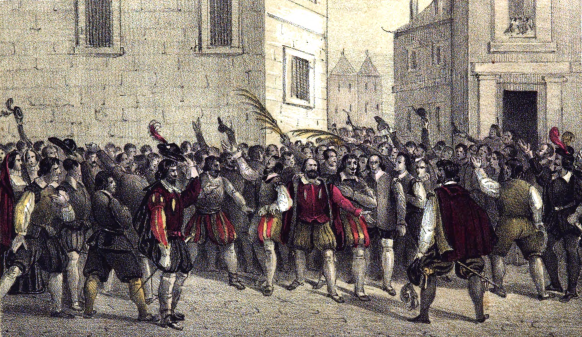
- The Mallorcan people freeing the leader of the Brotherhood, Joanot Colom, from prison.
Date	1521–1523
Location	Kingdom of Mallorca
Result	Royal victory

Commanders and leaders
Miguel de Gurrea; Ramon Carròs de Vilaragut	Joan Crespí; Joanot Colom

The Brotherhoods of Mallorca (Catalan: Germanies de Mallorca) was a revolt between 1521-23 against the urban middle-class and the high nobility, in part influenced by the Revolt of the Brotherhoods in the Kingdom of Valencia, which occurred in 1521 as a consequence of the imprisonment of seven artisans.

== Conflict ==
As in Valencia, the Brotherhood was run by a board of thirteen people (Junta dels Tretze). They seized the capital of Palma de Mallorca and dismissed the governor-general Miguel de Gurrea, who fled to Eivissa.
The revolt turned violent and the royalists fled inside the Bellver and Santueri castles. The two castles were besieged and Bellver Castle was stormed and its occupants murdered. The nobles who survived the massacre in Bellver Castle took refuge in Alcudia, the only location remaining loyal to the King during the year and a half that the Brotherhoods dominated the island.

In August 1522, the emperor Charles V of Germany sent 800 men under command of Ramon Carròs de Vilaragut i de Castellví to help Gurrea, who moved to Alcudia to join with the nobles in the retaking of the island.
After defeating the rebels in the battles of Son Fornari and Rafal Garcés, they besieged the capital in December 1522, and on 8 March 1523 the Brotherhoods surrendered Palma under the mediation of Bishop Rodrigo Sánchez Mercado. Despite the bishop's involvement in the surrender, over 200 Brothers were executed, and many fled to Catalonia.
