= Luis Fajardo =

Luis Fajardo may refer to:

- Luis Fajardo, 2nd Marquis of los Vélez (unknown–1574), Spanish noble, political and military
- Luis Fajardo (Spanish Navy officer) (c. 1556–1617), Spanish noble and admiral
- Luis Fajardo Fernández (unknown–1936), Spanish politician of the Republican Left
- Luis Fajardo (footballer) (born 1963), Colombian footballer
