= Germaine of Foix =

Queen of Aragon from 1506 to 1516

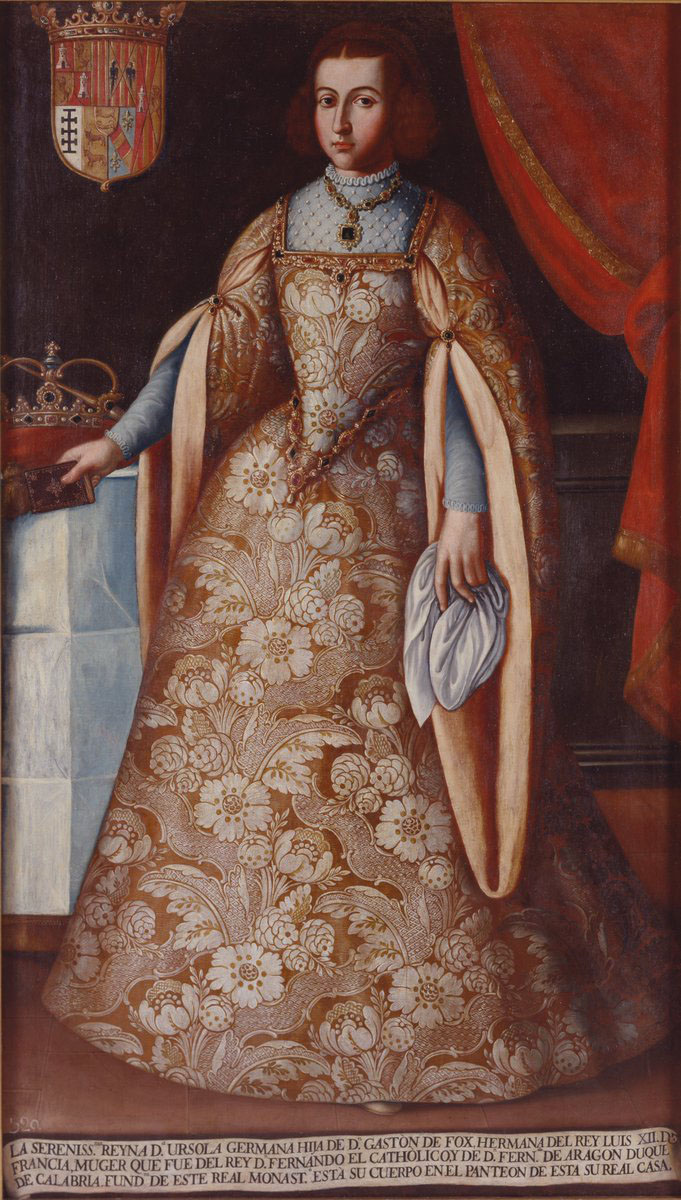

Queen consort of Aragon, Majorca, Valencia, Sardinia, Naples, and Sicily Countess consort of Barcelona
- Tenure: 19 October 1505 – 23 January 1516

Queen consort of Navarre
- Tenure: 24 August 1512 – 23 January 1516

Duchess consort of Calabria
- Tenure: August 1526 – 15 October 1536
- Born: c. 1488; Mazères(?), Kingdom of France
- Died: 15 October 1536 (aged 48); Llíria, Valencia, Kingdom of Valencia
- Burial: Monasterio de San Miguel de los Reyes
- Spouses: Ferdinand II of Aragon (m. 1505; died 1516) Johann of Brandenburg-Ansbach (m. 1519; died 1525) Ferdinand, Duke of Calabria (m. 1526)
- Issue Detail: John, Prince of Girona
Names
- Ursula Germaine
- House: Foix
- Father: John of Foix, Viscount of Narbonne
- Mother: Marie of Orléans

Ursula Germaine of Foix (Note: French: Ursule-Germaine de Foix; Catalan: Úrsula Germana de Foix;) (c. 1488 – 15 October 1536) was an early modern French noblewoman from the House of Foix. She was the daughter of John, Viscount of Narbonne, and Marie of Orléans and granddaughter of Queen Eleanor of Navarre. By marriage to King Ferdinand II of Aragon (Eleanor's half-brother), she was Queen of Aragon, Majorca, Naples, Sardinia, Sicily, and Valencia and Princess of Catalonia from 1505 to 1516 and Queen of Navarre from 1512 to 1516. She was Vicereine of Valencia from 1523 until her death in 1536, jointly with her second and third husbands, respectively Johann of Brandenburg-Ansbach and Ferdinand, Duke of Calabria. By her third marriage, she was Duchess of Calabria.

== Ancestry ==
Ursula Germaine of Foix was born around 1488, possibly in Mazères, Kingdom of France. Her father was John of Foix, Count of Étampes and Viscount of Narbonne, and her mother was Marie d'Orléans, the sister of Louis XII of France. Germaine had one sibling, a younger brother, Gaston of Foix, Duke of Nemours, who was an acclaimed military commander in the Italian Wars. Germaine's paternal grandmother, Queen Leonor of Navarra, was the older sister of Ferdinand the Catholic King, so Germaine was the great-niece of her future husband. Although part of the royal house of Navarre, she spent her childhood in association with the French monarchy.

== Queen of Aragon ==
=== Background ===
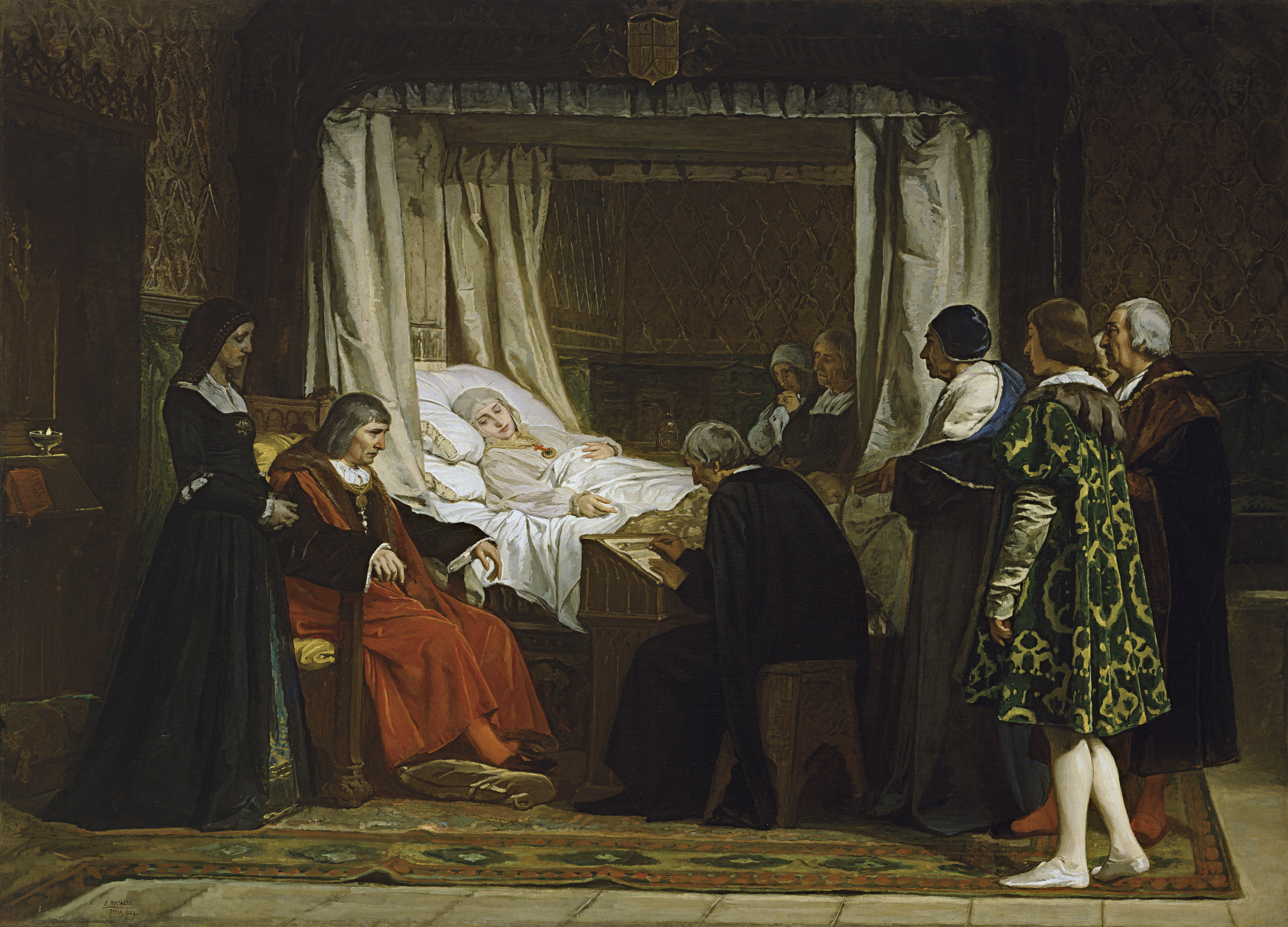
An 1864 depiction of Queen Isabella dictating her will; her husband is sitting beside her bed in red.

On 26 November 1504, Isabella I of Castile, queen regnant of the countries of the Crown of Castile and queen consort of those in the Crown of Aragon (1451–1504), died. As both her son and her grandsons had already died, the Crown of Castile was inherited by her eldest living daughter, Joanna of Castile ("Joanna the Mad"; 1479–1555) and Joanna's husband, Archduke Philip of Austria, Lord of the Netherlands and Duke of Burgundy (Philip the Handsome; 1478–1506). King Ferdinand II of Aragon, Isabella's widower and Joanna's father, thus lost control of the countries that he had only ruled jure uxoris (Latin: "by right of [his] wife").

His main concern was that with his own death, the Crown of Aragon would also be inherited by Joanna and Philip, passing most of the Iberian peninsula to the House of Habsburg. This could have been prevented by the birth of a male heir to Ferdinand, who would have displaced Joanna from at least the order of succession of Aragon. As part of an alignment with the Kingdom of France, he agreed to marry Germaine of Foix, niece of King Louis XII. Their engagement was established on 12 October 1505, in 2nd Treaty of Blois, in which Louis XII ceded his claims to the Kingdoms of Naples and Jerusalem to his niece, provided that she had a son from the marriage. Naples was already under Ferdinand's control, while the Kingdom of Jerusalem was practically nonexistent by this time. Through the union, Ferdinand hoped to father a male heir and gain accession to the throne of Navarre.

=== Marriage ===
Germaine married Ferdinand by proxy on 19 October 1505 in Blois. She was 17 and he was 53. Germaine entered her new country at Hondarribia, where she was received by Alonso de Aragón, Archbishop of Zaragoza, her new husband's illegitimate son. She met her husband on 18 March 1506 in Dueñas, where the marriage was consummated; great celebrations followed in Valladolid. The marriage led to a short period of peace between France and Aragon, but was badly received in Castile, where the majority of people had previously supported Ferdinand's claims, but saw his remarriage as a betrayal of their late queen, his first wife Isabella. The older king was a considerate, tender, and respectful husband, who reportedly had much sexual desire for his young wife, as well as for other women.

Our [k]ing, if he does not rid himself of his appetites, will soon give his soul to the [C]reator and his body to the earth; he is already in the 63rd year of his life and does not allow his wife to separate from him and she is not enough for him, at least in his desire.

— Pedro Mártir de Anglería, de Salazar y Acha, Jaime. "Germana de Foix". Real Academia de la Historia (in Spanish)

Ferdinand's son-in-law, Philip, had died on 25 September 1506. Ferdinand convinced the cortes that Queen Joanna was too mentally ill to govern, and was appointed her guardian and regent of her countries. On 3 May 1509, Germaine gave birth to a son, Infante John, Prince of Girona, who died shortly after his birth. The couple did not have another child. If John had lived, or if they had had another son, the Crown of Aragon would have split from the Crown of Castile again, after being semi-united by the marriage of Ferdinand and Isabella. On 28 January 1513, the King granted his wife the Viscounty of Castellbó, a former possession of her family, the House of Foix. While Germaine was not very politically active, she did represent her husband at the 1512 Cortes Generales and the 1515 Cortes of Aragon. She was presiding over the latter when she received news of her husband dying, and she rushed to his deathbed in Madrigalejo.

=== Queen Dowager ===
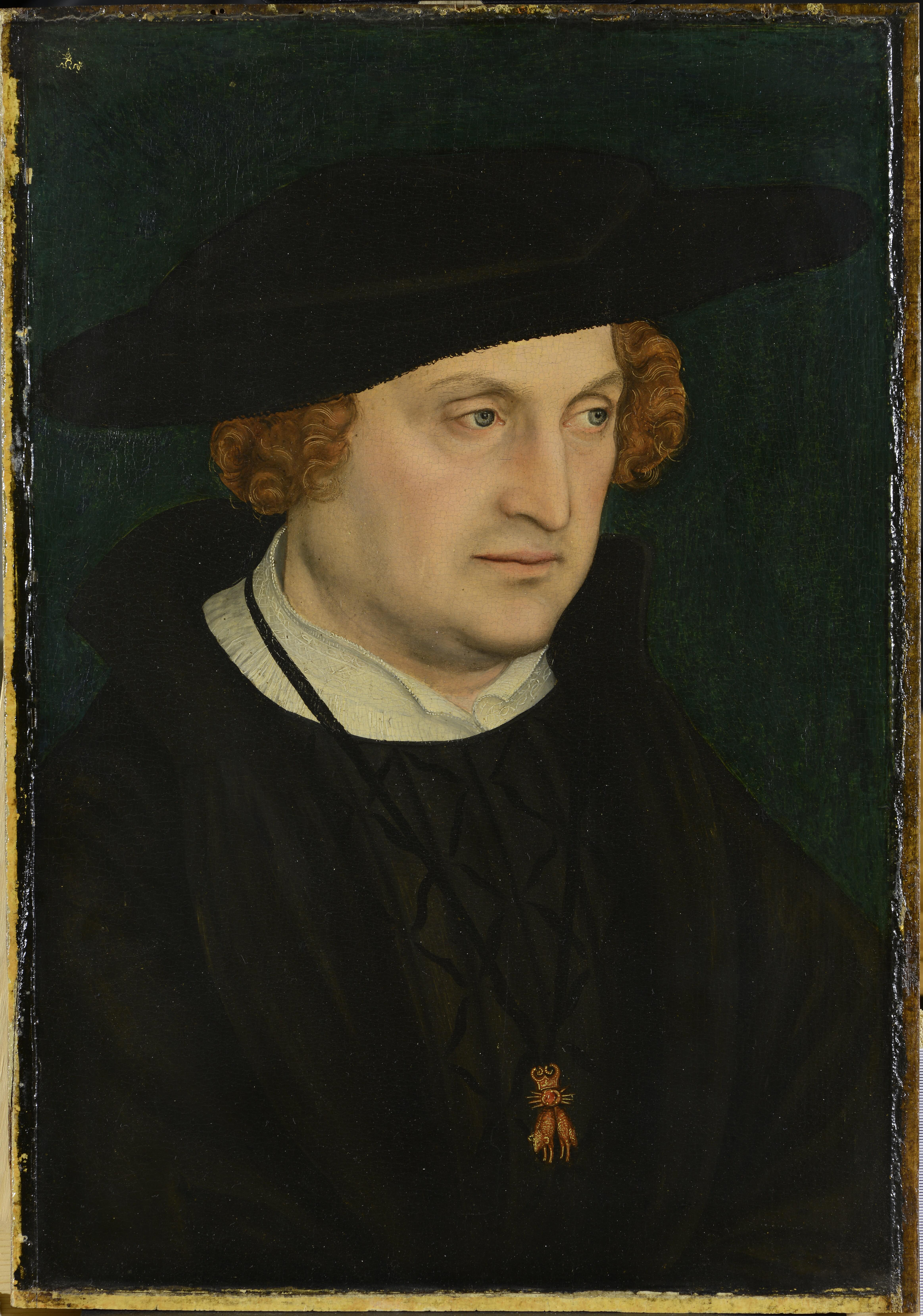
Her second husband, Johann of Brandenburg-Ansbach, circa 1520, Lucas Cranach the Elder's painting.

After two years of health problems, King Ferdinand died on 23 January 1516. In his will he left Germaine Syracuse, Sicily, the towns of Tàrrega, Sabadell and Villagrasa in Catalonia, and Basilicata in Naples, and ordered his grandson Archduke Charles to take care of her. Charles, Queen Joanna's son who had been raised in the Habsburg Netherlands, arrived in Castile in 1517, and Germaine moved from Aragon to be closer to his court, and lived in the Monastery of El Abrojo near Valladolid. At first, her stepgrandson, only 12 years her junior, showed much respect for her, rising from his seat and uncovering his head if she entered the room and addressing her kneeling, but soon abandoned this courtesy. He did, however, grant her Olmedo and Madrigal de las Altas Torres on 19 June 1517 and Arévalo on 15 March 1518. Around this time, she was described as "not very beautiful, somewhat lame, a great lover of lounging around and going to banquets, orchards, gardens, and parties".

In 1519, Charles travelled to Aragon to take his oath as king, and Germaine went with him. While in Barcelona, Charles arranged a marriage for Germaine with Margrave Johann of Brandenburg-Ansbach, Viceroy of Valencia, a landless cadet of the House of Hohenzollern. He was a cousin of Joachim I Nestor, Prince-elector of the Margraviate of Brandenburg, whose vote Charles needed in order to be elected Holy Roman Emperor. Germaine and Charles then travelled together to Germany where she was married.

Prior to it, in May 1520, Germaine accompanied Charles V to England, where he met Henry VIII and Catherine of Aragon and Mary Tudor, Queen of France (Henry's sister) in Canterbury.

Germaine and Charles may also have had an affair, which resulted in an illegitimate child, although this is disputed.

== Vicereine of Valencia ==
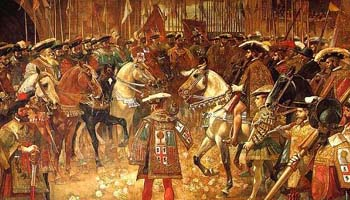
A 19th or early 20th century depiction of a scene from the revolt by Marcelino de Unceta.

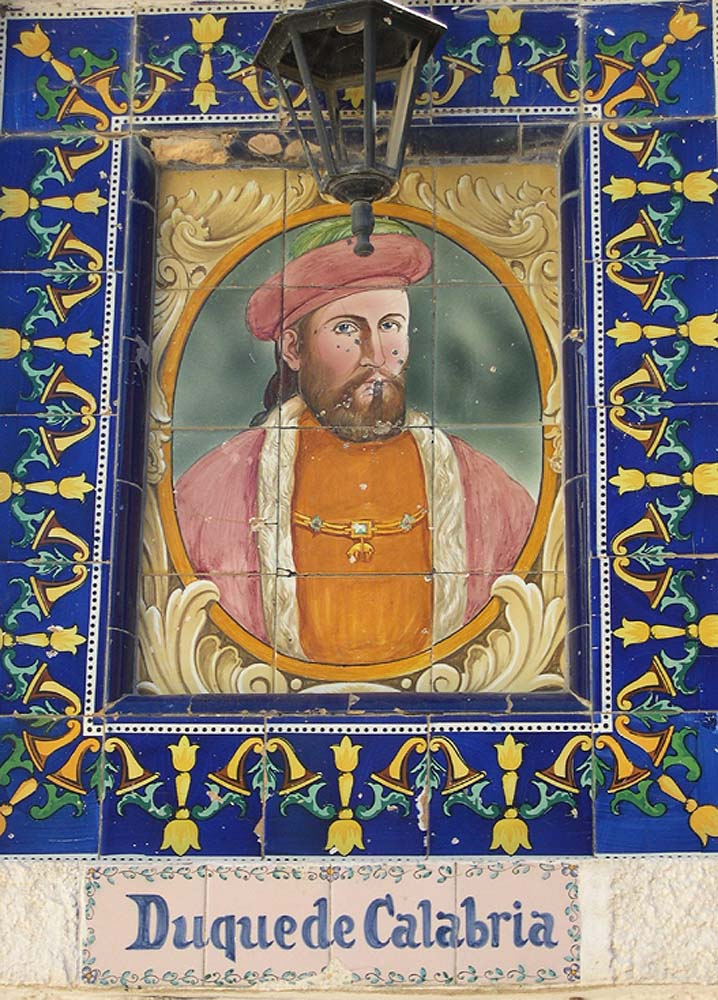
Depiction of her third husband, the Duke of Calabria.

In 1523, Charles appointed the couple viceroys of Valencia. In this position, Germaine had to solve the problem of the 1519–1523 Revolt of the Brotherhoods (Catalan: Revolta de les Germanies), an anti-monarchist, anti-feudal autonomist revolt of artisan guilds ("germanies"), inspired by the Italian republics. She imposed harsh punishments on participants, known as agermanats, and is thought to have signed the execution warrants of 100 former rebels. This was the opposite of the more lenient approach of her predecessor, Diego Hurtado de Mendoza, Count of Melito and Lemus (1469–1536), who had worked for reconciliation. In December 1524, Germaine signed a pardon that officially ended the persecution of all agermanats, but fines imposed on guilds and guild-aligned cities would take many years to pay.

Germaine's second marriage was unhappy and abusive, Johann being a violent person engaging in various forms of debauchery. They had no children, and he died in 1525. Germaine remarried a year later, in August 1526 in Seville to Ferdinand, Duke of Calabria (1488–1550), the eldest son of Frederick of Naples, the deposed king of Naples. The couple was patrons of literature and music at their court. The poets Juan Fernández de Heredia (circa 1310–1396), Luis de Milán (circa 1500–circa 1561), and Baltasar de Romaní (circa 1485–1547) were among their protégés. They also collected Greek and Latin codices. Germaine worked towards the gradual integration of Valencia into Castile–dominated Spain. It has been suggested by Valencian historians that Germaine's move to Valencia was the first step towards the degradation of the reputation of the Valencian language, as the higher classes started using Castilian Spanish instead of their first language to please her.

Germaine died on 15 October 1536 in Llíria, Valencia, at the age of 48, probably due to an edema caused by obesity. She was buried in the Monasterio de San Miguel de los Reyes ("Saint Michael of the Kings Monastery"), which she had founded. Her third husband survived her by 14 years and remained Viceroy of Valencia until his death in 1550. He remarried to a widow, Mencía de Mendoza (1508–1554) in 1541, with whom he continued his patronage of arts.

== Infanta Isabel of Castile ==
In her will, Germaine de Foix included a major legacy to Isabel (1518–1537), a natural daughter of Charles V:

Item, we bequeath and leave the string of 133 large pearls, which is the best that we possess, to the Most Serene Infanta Isabel of Castile, daughter of His Majesty the emperor, my son and my lord, on account of the great love that we feel for His Highness.

A few days after Germaine's death, her husband sent a copy of the will to Empress Isabella with a cover letter noting "that Your Majesty can see the bequest of pearls that she left to the Most Serene Infanta."

In 1998, Jaime de Salazar y Acha cited the will and cover letter as evidence that Infanta Isabel may have been the daughter of Germaine and Charles V. Historian Manuel Fernández Álvarez agreed with this interpretation but did not provide any further evidence.

The claim was controversial and other historians have not accepted it. In her biography Germana de Foix (2003), Rosa Ríos Lloret pointed out that the will shows that Charles had a daughter named Isabel, but does not name her mother. Jaime de Salazar y Acha asserted that "the recent theory that Queen Germana left illegitimate offspring is completely unfounded."

In his 2019 biography of Charles V, Geoffrey Parker claimed that in Valencia, the emperor's daughter Maria was known as Isabel. Parker wrote "the emperor did not sire a daughter named Isabel; neither with Queen Germaine nor with anyone else", but he did not explain why her father would refer to her in documents, including his will, by a local nickname rather than her given name.

== Issue ==
- By her first husband, Ferdinand II of Aragon (1452–1516), whom she married in 1505 or 1506:
  - John, Prince of Girona (born and died 3 May 1509), who died a few hours after his birth.

== Arms ==
Coat of arms as queen consort and queen dowager (1505–1519)

Coat of arms after her second marriage (1519-1536)

== Bibliography ==
- Abernethy, Susan. "Germaine de Foix, Queen of Aragon, Naples, Sardinia, Navarre and Sicily and Vicereine of Valencia". Academia.edu.
- Lynch, John (1964). Spain under the Habsburgs. Vol. 1. New York: Oxford University Press. p. 40.
- Marino, Nancy F. (1992). "The Literary Court in Valencia, 1526–1536". Hispanófila (104): 1–15. ISSN 0018-2206. JSTOR 43808291.
- Parker, Geoffrey (2019). Emperor: A New Life of Charles V. Yale University Press. ISBN 9780300196528.
- Woodacre, Elena (2013). The Queens Regnant of Navarre: Succession, Politics, and Partnership, 1274–1512. Palgrave Macmillan.

Royal titles
Preceded by Isabella I of Castile	Queen consort of Aragon, Majorca, Valencia, and Sicily, Countess consort of Barcelona; Queen consort of Naples; 1505 – 1516	Succeeded by Isabella of Portugal
