= Battle of Oriola (1521) =

Coordinates: 38°5′8″N 0°56′49″W

Battle of Oriola Battle of Orihuela
- Part of Revolt of the Brotherhoods
Date	30 August 1521
Location	Orihuela, Kingdom of Valencia (Spain)
Result	Royalist victory

Belligerents
Agermanados	Royalists

Commanders and leaders
Micar Bocanegra friar Miquel Garcia; Pere Palomares (executed)	Pedro Fajardo; Pero Maza de Lizana

Strength
± 7,000 infantrymen	5,500 soldiers

Casualties and losses
± 2,000	Unknown

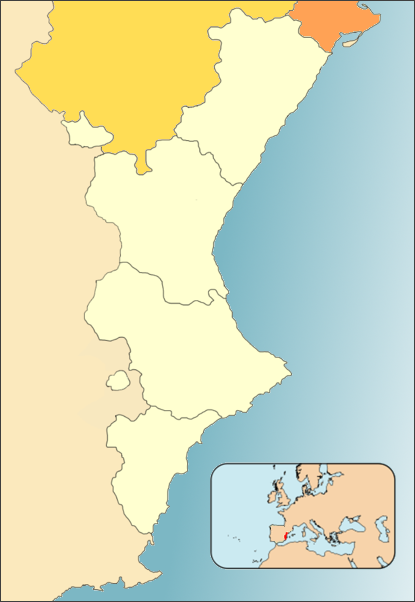
Kingdom of Valencia, 1493-1707

The Battle of Oriola or Battle of Orihuela was an armed conflict fought between the troops of the Agermanados (Agermanats or members of the Revolt of the Brotherhoods), mainly artisan guilds, and those of Pedro Fajardo y Chacón, Marqués de los Vélez, on 30 August 1521 in Oriola (Orihuela), in the Kingdom of Valencia (now in Spain).

== The Battle ==
The events were marked by strong internal disputes amongst the Agermanats (members of the Revolt of the Brotherhoods), which were divided between moderates and radicals. This led to a significant decline in their forces, just over a month after the Battle of Gandia.

After the movement became more radically hostile to the nobility, seeking land reform, it was crushed in the battle of Oriola on 20 August 1521.

The defeat of the Germanias at Oriola was a crucial blow to the Revolt of the Brotherhoods. It killed more than 2,000 men and was accompanied by a major crackdown, with the execution of 40 leaders of the Agermanados and the plundering of the city of Orihuela. As a result, the southern Kingdom of Valencia, from Alicante to Ontinyent, fell into royalist hands.
