= Alfonso de Aragón y Portugal =

Alfonso de Aragón y Portugal Duke of Segorbe
- Born: 1489; Segorbe
- Died: 1563 (aged 73–74); Segorbe

Alfonso de Aragón y Portugal, or Alfonso I de Ampurias (1489–1563), was Count of Ampurias and Duke of Segorbe.

== Biography ==
He was a son of Enrique de Aragón y Pimentel and Guiomar de Portugal, and succeeded his father as Count of Ampurias and 2nd Duke of Segorbe after his death in 1522.
In 1516 he married Duchess Juana I Folch de Cardona, 3rd Duke of Cardona, daughter and heiress of Fernando Ramon Folch, 2nd Duke of Cardona. This made him 3rd Duke-consort of Cardona.

During the Revolt of the Brotherhoods, the 2nd Duke of Segorbe fought against the rebels. On 18 July 1521, he won an important victory in the Battle of Almenara.
He was viceroy of Valencia from 1558 until his death in 1563.
In 1555 he became a Knight in the Order of the Golden Fleece.

== Children ==
They had 13 children, including:

- Francisco de Aragón (1539–1572), his successor, no issue
- Guiomar de Aragón (1540–1557), married Fadrique Álvarez de Toledo, 4th Duke of Alba
- Juana de Cardona (1542–1608), V Countess of Cardona and IV Duchess of Segorbe, after her brother's death, married Diego Fernández de Córdoba, 3rd marquis of Comares and had issue.
- Ana de Aragón (?–1567), married Vespasiano I Gonzaga.
- Isabel de Aragón, married Juan Ximénez de Urrea, Count of Aranda.

He also had at least one illegitimate child :

- Pedro de Aragón (?–1597), Bishop of Lérida, Vich and Jaca.
