= Johann of Brandenburg-Ansbach, Viceroy of Valencia =

German nobleman (1493–1525)

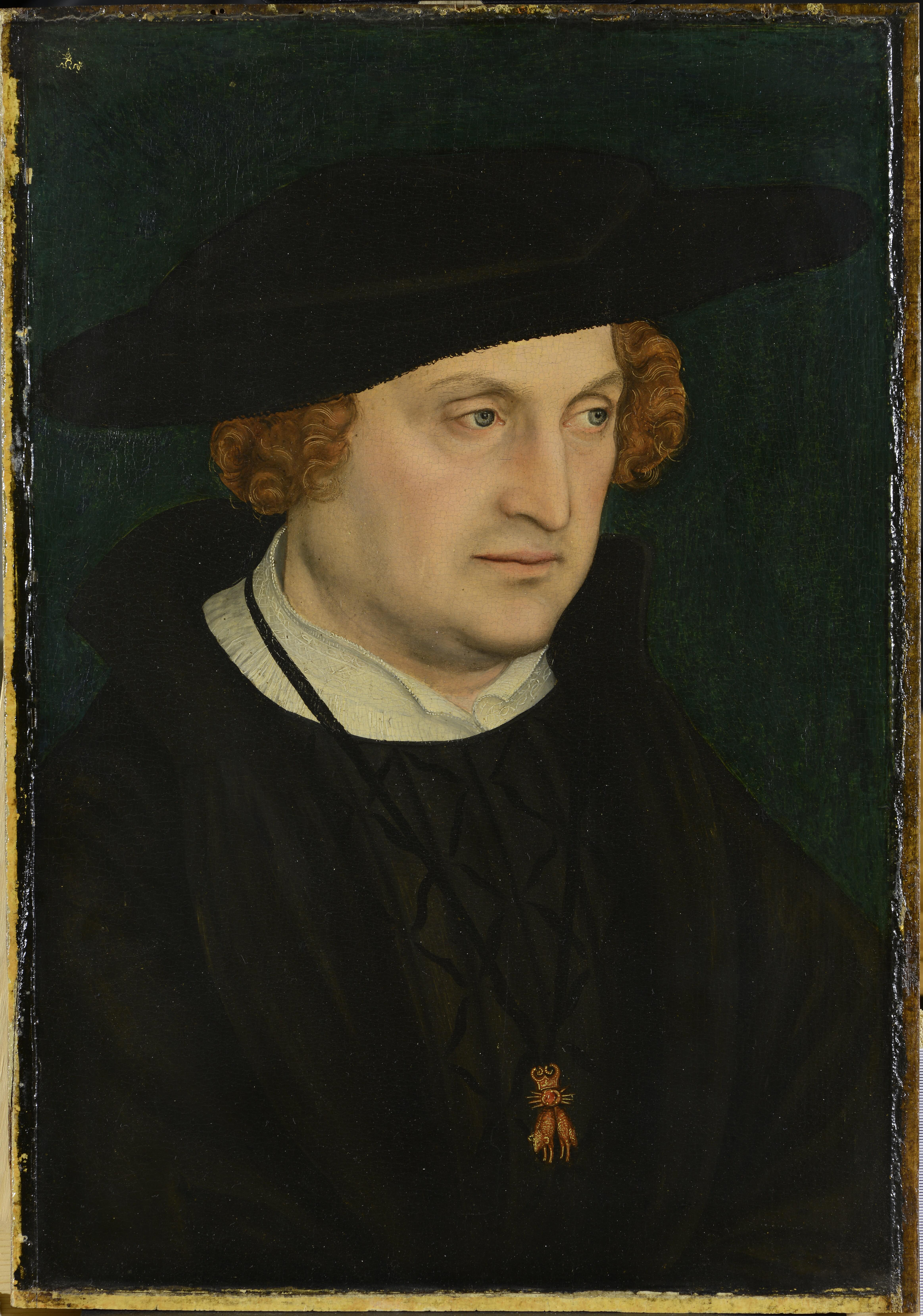
Portrait by Lucas Cranach the Elder, c. 1520

Johann of Brandenburg-Ansbach (9 January 1493 in Plassenburg – 5 July 1525 in Valencia) was the second husband of Germaine de Foix and viceroy of Valencia from 1523 until his death in 1525.

== Biography ==
He was a son of Frederick I, Margrave of Brandenburg-Ansbach and his wife Sophia of Poland.

He entered the service of Emperor Maximilian I at an early age, just like his eldest brother Casimir. He helped Casimir force their mentally ill father to abdicate on 25 March 1515 and reorganize the government in the Franconian hereditary lands. In 1516, he went to Spain to the court of King Charles I, whose special favor he won through the zeal he showed as a negotiator in Charles's bid for the imperial throne.

As a result, Charles made him a knight in the Order of the Golden Fleece, appointed him Viceroy of Valencia and arranged his marriage on 17 June 1519 to Germaine de Foix,second wife and widow of King Ferdinand II of Aragon In 1521, he and his wife accompanied Charles to Germany for the latter's imperial coronation.

On 5 July 1526, he died suddenly in Valencia, allegedly poisoned by a Spanish nobleman or by his wife.
Other sources blame his early death on his dissolute lifestyle.

The marriage remained childless. After his death, Germaine of Foix remarried Ferdinand of Aragón, Duke of Calabria.
