= Carles Boix =

Catalan and American academic

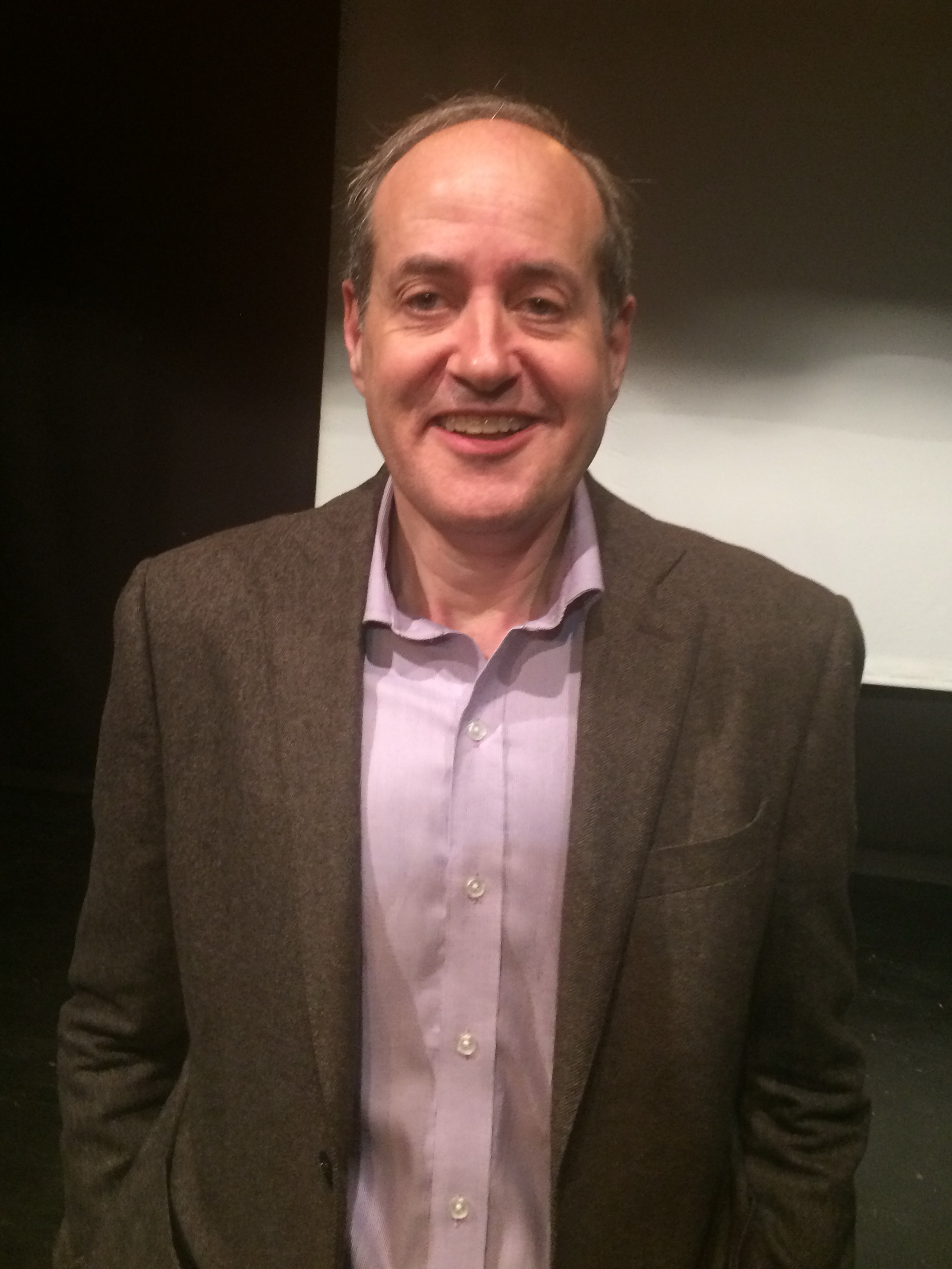
Carles Boix

Carles Boix i Serra (born 29 June 1962, in Barcelona) is a Catalan and American political scientist specializing in comparative politics, currently teaching at Princeton University. He is a leading scholar in empirical democratic theory and comparative political economy.

Boix attended the University of Barcelona in his hometown, and earned his master's degree and doctorate from Harvard University. He taught at Ohio State University and the University of Chicago before joining the Princeton University Department of Politics faculty, where he is Robert Garrett Professor of Politics and Public Affairs at the Woodrow Wilson School of Public and International Affairs.

Boix has published Political Parties, Growth and Equality (Cambridge University Press, 1998), Democracy and Redistribution (Cambridge University Press, 2003), Political Order and Inequality (Cambridge University Press, 2015), and Democratic Capitalism at the Crossroads (Princeton University Press, 2019). He co-edited the Oxford Handbook of Comparative Politics (Oxford University Press, 2007) and has published in leading journals such as American Political Science Review, American Journal of Political Science, British Journal of Political Science, Journal of Law, Economics and Organization, Journal of Politics, International Organization, and World Politics.

Boix received a Guggenheim fellowship in 2004, while at Chicago. In 2010, he was named a fellow of the American Academy of Arts and Sciences.

== Major works ==
- Democratic Capitalism at the Crossroads. Technological Change and the Future of Politics. Princeton: Princeton University Press, 2019.
- Political Order and Inequality. New York: Cambridge University Press, 2015.
- Democracy and Redistribution. New York: Cambridge University Press, 2003.
- Political Parties, Growth, and Equality. Conservative and Social Democratic Strategies in the World Economy. New York: Cambridge University Press, 1998.
