= Marcelino de Unceta =

Spanish painter

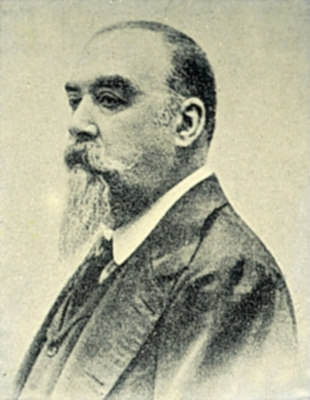
- Marcelino de Unceta
- Born: Marcelino de Unceta y López; 22 October 1835; Zaragoza, Spain
- Died: 10 March 1905 (aged 69); Madrid, Spain
- Education: Zaragoza School of Fine Arts; School of Fine Arts, Madrid
- Known for: Painter and illustrator

Marcelino de Unceta y López (22 October 1835 – 10 March 1905) was an artist, illustrator, and painter of Zaragoza and Madrid. Unceta produced historical paintings, especially those of military history, as well as illustrating sketches and posters meant for advertising. He is known for creating in 1879 what is considered the first poster for a bullfight. His memorable drawings of horses and bulls in his posters made him a well-known artist in Spain of the time.

== Biography ==
Unceta was born in Zaragoza in 1835. He started his artistic education at the Zaragoza School of Fine Arts in 1850, and continued his training at the Madrid School of Fine Arts. Unceta began work as an illustrator for the newspapers. In 1879, he produced his first poster for a bullfight, the art that would give him later fame. He also collaborated in the workshop with his Huescan friend Eduardo Portabella on lithography. Another notable work was Unceta's design of the curtain of the Teatro Principal of Zaragoza circa 1877, which can be seen today in its original location. It illustrates allegorical figures of the muses of drama, who are linked to drawings of famous Spanish authors and actors of the time.

Unceta died in 1905, in Madrid.

== Artistic style and work ==
Unceta was a skilled painter of military practices; he made many paintings of battle maneuvers in a careful and realistic style. He also painted many parades. His artistic style was similar to that of the contemporaneous French artist Meissonier. Unceta made a number of "genre works", such as a series of paintings of the Siege of Saragossa of the Peninsular War. He was also influenced by the Romantic movement, such as in his painting "El suspiro del moro" ("The sigh of the Moor", a reference to King Boabdil of Granada). Unceta also painted the frescos that decorate the central dome of the Basilica of Our Lady of the Pillar in Zaragoza; the frescoes depict martyrs and bishops of Aragon.

== Gallery ==
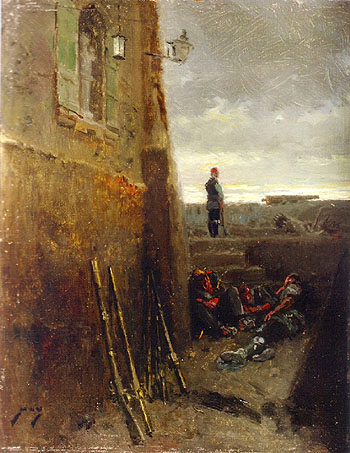
Baturro (a term for an Aragonese peasant) on guard during the Siege of Zaragoza

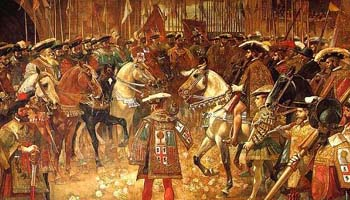
La paz de las Germanías ("The Meeting of the Brotherhoods"), a scene from the Revolt of the Brotherhoods
