= La Plana =

la Plana
- Singular population entity
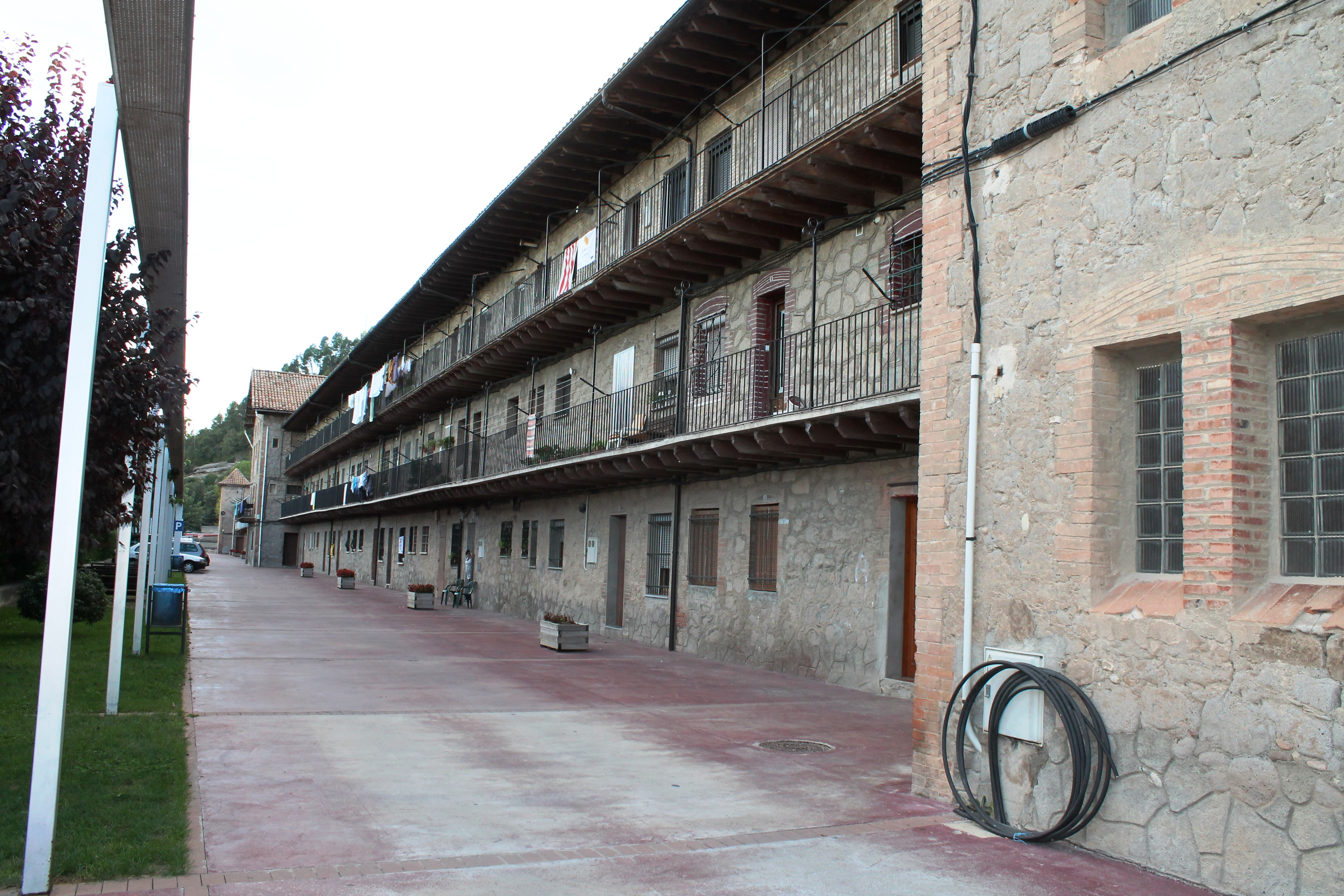
- View of la Plana

- Location within Spain Location within Catalonia Location within Province of Barcelona
- Coordinates: 42°03′10.8″N 1°52′17.6″E
- Country: Spain
- A. community: Catalunya
- Province: Barcelona
- Municipality: Avià

Population (January 1, 2024)
  - Total: 74
- Time zone: UTC+01:00
- Postal code: 08610
- MCN: 08011000500

la Plana is a singular population entity in the municipality of Avià, in Catalonia, Spain.

As of 2024 it has a population of 74 people.
