= Vicente Boix =

Spanish playwright, poet, and historian

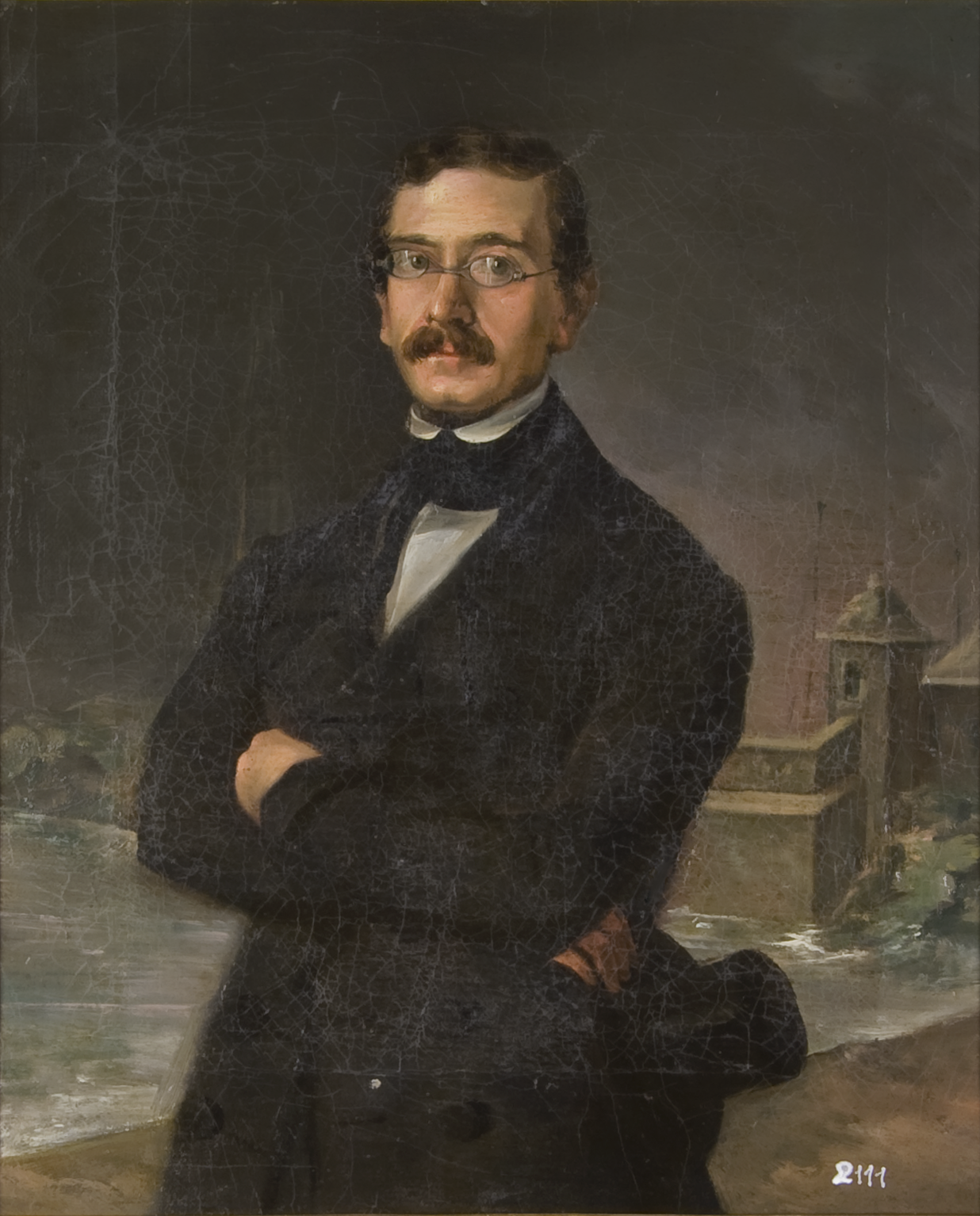
Vicente Boix

Vicente Boix y Ricarte (27 April 1813 – 7 March 1880) was a Spanish playwright, poet, and historian from Xàtiva, Valencia.

== Works ==
Boix wrote El encubierto de Valencia in 1852 and earlier he wrote Historia de la ciudad y reino de Valencia in three volumes in 1845. His Obras poéticas appeared in two volumes in 1850 and 1851, Poesías históricas y caballerescas and Poesías líricas y dramáticas. A much broader selection of his work is in Obras literarias selectas which was written in 1880.

El encubierto de Valencia was based on the life of El Encubierto, a mysterious rebel who claimed to be the rightful king of Spain who had been hidden away.
