= Emili Boix-Fuster =

Spanish sociolinguist

Emili Boix-Fuster (born 1956 in Barcelona) is a sociolinguist. His main academic interests are sociolects, intergenerational language transmission and linguistic ideologies in Catalan-speaking territories.

== Education ==
Boix-Fuster studied Catalan Philology (1974–1979) and Hispanic Philology (1980–1983) at the University of Barcelona. From 1983 to 1985 he did his PhD courses in Sociolinguistics at Georgetown University in Washington, DC, USA).

== Career ==
Boix taught Catalan Linguistics at the School of Education at the Autonomous University of Barcelona (1980–1983, and 1985–1989); since 1989, he has taught Sociolinguistics, Language Planning, Catalan Language, History of Catalan and Discourse analysis at the University of Barcelona.

He has been president of the Societat Catalana de Sociolingüística [Association of Catalan Sociolinguists] and he is currently the director of its academic journal, Treballs de Sociolingüística Catalana [Working Papers in Catalan Sociolinguistics] and member of the steering committee of Llengua, Societat I Comunicació [Language, Society and Communication].

Boix has been the main researcher of the project EVOTRANLING [Evolution and Transmission of Linguistic groups in Medium-Sized Linguistic Communities, 2013–2016), funded by the Spanish government. He has also won several prizes in Sociolinguistics, such as “Jaume Camp” (Òmnium Cultural del Vallès Oriental), “La Lupa d’Or” (Institut d´Estudis Catalans), “Prat de la Riba” and “Serra i Moret”. He was a founder of the CUSC (University Center of Sociolinguistics and Communication) at the University of Barcelona.

Since 2016, he has been the main researcher of the project EVOGEN (Intergenerational Evolution of Bilingualization Processes: Linguistic Contexts, Maintenance and Substitution). He is also the coordinator of the research area Ethnographic and anthropological sociolinguistics within the network CRUSCAT (Institut d’Estudis Catalans). In addition, he is a member of the steering committee of the international NGO Linguapaxl.

== Publications ==
Emili Boix has published many articles in different academic journals. Furthermore, he has written the following books:

- Triar no és trair. Llengües i identitats en joves de Barcelona (1993) [Choosing doesn’t mean to betray. Languages and identities among young people in Barcelona]
- ¿Una lengua, un estado? [One language, one state?] (Co-published with Albert Bastardas) (1994)
- Els futurs del català. Un estat de la qüestió i una qüestió d´estat (edited in 2008) [The futures of Catalan: A state of art and a matter of state]
- Català o castellà amb els fills. La transmissió de la llengua en famílies bilingües a Barcelona (2009) [Catalan or Spanish with your children. Language transmission in bilingual families in Barcelona], Democratic Policies for Language Revitalisation: the Case of Catalan (co-published with Miquel Strubell) (2011)
- Les llengües al sofà. El bilingüisme familiar als països de llengua catalana [Languages on the coach. Family bilingualism in the Catalan-speaking territories] (co-published with Rosa Mari Torrens)
- Civisme contra cinisme Llengües per a viure i conviure (2012) [Civic responsibility against cynicism. Languages to live with]
- Urban Diversities and Language Policies (edited).
