= Luis Fajardo, 2nd Marquis of los Vélez =

Spanish nobleman

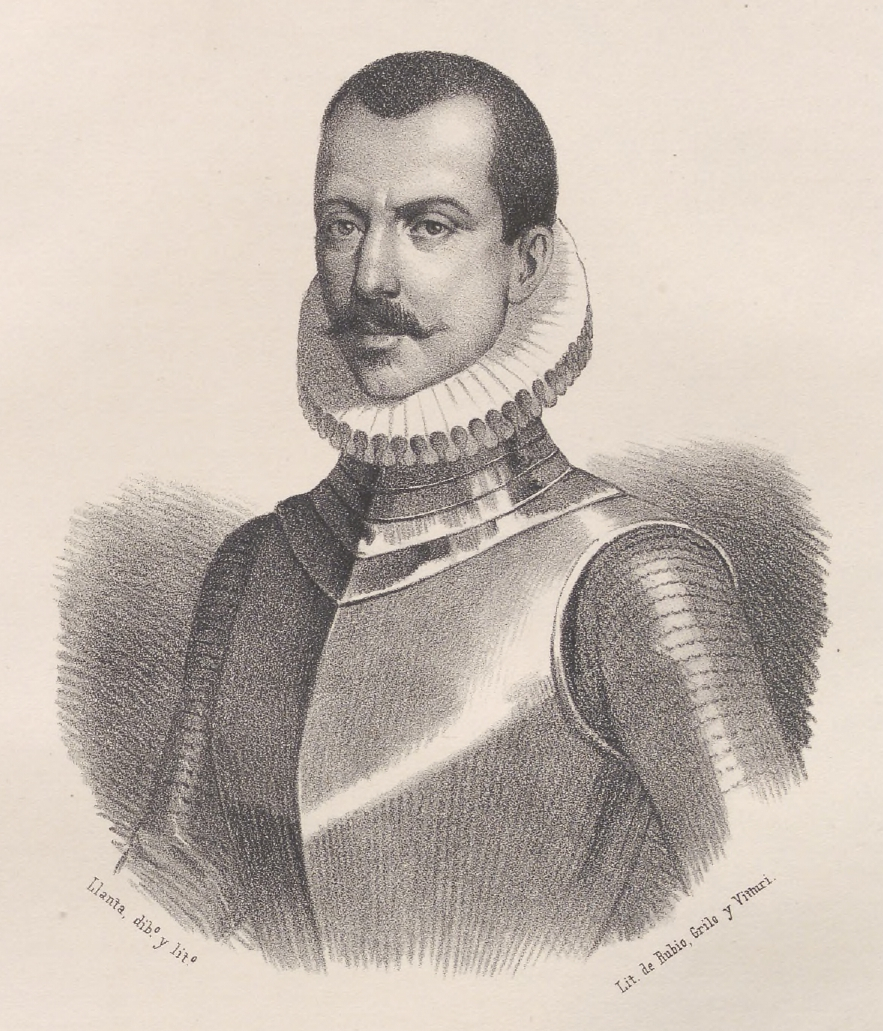
Portrait included in the Crónica de la provincia de Jaén (1867), identified in the work as "Marqués de los Vélez". The lithograph, retrospective in nature, apparently depicts Luis Fajardo.

Luis Yáñez Fajardo y La Cueva, 2nd Marquis of los Vélez, Grandee of Spain, (in full, Spanish: Don Luis Yáñez Fajardo y La Cueva, segundo marqués de los Vélez, señor de Mula, Lebrilla, Alhama y Benitaglar, Adelantado mayor y capitán general de los Reinos de Murcia y Granada, alcaide de los alcázares de Murcia y Lorca, Adelantado mayor y capitán general del Reino de Valencia, capitán general de la gente de armas del Reino de Valencia para el socorro de Perpiñán, comendador de Monasterio y la Reina, comendador de Caravaca), (unknown - 1574) was a Spanish military and nobleman.

== Family ==
He was the only son of Don Pedro Fajardo, 1st Marquis of Los Vélez by second wife Dona Mencía de la Cueva.

He married in 1526 Dona Leonor Fernández de Córdoba, daughter of the 3rd Count of Cabra, who also died in 1575. They were the parents of the 3rd Marquess of Los Vélez, 2nd Marquess of Molina, etc., except for admiral Don Luis Fajardo, since his mother was Ana Ruiz de Avendaño y Alarcón.

He was the ancestor of the 1st Baron of Castellvell de Rosanés and 1st Marquess of Martorell in 1627 Don Luis Francisco Fajardo de Zúñiga, Requeséns y Girón, ?th Lord of the Majorat of Martorell in Catalonia, son of the 5th Marquesses of los Vélez.

== Titles and military career ==
He was the 2nd Marquis of los Vélez Grandee of Spain First Class with a Coat of Arms of Fajardo, 2nd Count of Gagliano, 4th Count and Lord of the City of Cartagena and the 8th Lord of Alhama, Mula, Librilla, Molina de Segura, La Puebla, etc. He was Adelantado-Mayor and Captain-General / Captain-Major of the Kingdom of Murcia and Granada, Captain-General of the Kingdom of Granada, where he was the first to enter with his Army on 4 or 6 January 1569, Alcalde of Lorca, Knight and Commander of Caravaca and Thirteen (Trece) in the Order of Santiago.

He was created 1st Marquis of Molina de Segura on 16 August 1535 by Charles I of Spain.

== Sources ==
- Castro Pereira Mouzinho de Albuquerque e Cunha, Fernando de (1995). Instrumentário Genealógico - Linhagens Milenárias (in Portuguese). pp. 319–20.
- Hobbs, Nicolas (2007). "Grandes de España" (in Spanish).
- Instituto de Salazar y Castro. Elenco de Grandezas y Titulos Nobiliarios Españoles (in Spanish). periodic publication.

Spanish nobility
Preceded by Pedro Fajardo	Marquis of Los Vélez; 1542–1575	Succeeded by Pedro II Fajardo
New title	Marquis of Molina; 1535–1575	Succeeded by Pedro II Fajardo
