= List of viceroys of Valencia =

This is a list of viceroys of the Kingdom of Valencia from 1520 to 1707.

- 1520 : Diego Hurtado de Mendoza, 1st Count of Melito
- 1523 : Germaine of Foix and Johann of Brandenburg-Ansbach
- 1526 : Germaine of Foix and Ferdinand of Aragon, Duque de Calabria
- 1537 : Ferdinand of Aragón, Duke of Calabria
- 1550 : Lorenzo de Villarrasa (Interim) (1st time)
- 1553 : Bernardino de Cárdenas y Pacheco, Duque de Maqueda
- Juan Romeu Aguiló Llansol de Romaní y Codinat was interim regent during Villarrasa's first term, then a second time during Maqueda's term.
- 1558 : Alfonso de Aragón, Duque de Segorbe
- 1563 : Lorenzo de Villarrasa (2nd time)
- 1566 : Antonio Alfonso Pimentel de Herrera, Conde de Benavente
- 1572 : Íñigo López de Hurtado de Mendoza, Marqués de Mondéjar
- 1575 : Vespasiano Gonzaga y Colonna, Prínce of Sabbioneta
- 1578 : Pedro Manrique de Lara, Duque de Nájera
- 1580 : Francisco de Moncada y Folc de Cardona, Marqués de Aytona
- 1595 : Francisco Gómez de Sandoval y Rojas, Marqués de Denia
- 1598 : Juan Alfonso Pimentel de Herrera, Conde de Benavente
- 1602 : Juan de Ribera, Archbishop of Valencia
- 1604 : Juan de Sandoval y Rojas, Marqués de Villamizar
- 1606 : Luis Carrillo de Toledo, Marqués de Caracena
- 1615 : Gómez Suárez de Figueroa, 3rd Duke of Feria
- 1618 : Antonio Pimentel y Toledo, Marqués de Tavara
- 1622 : Enrique de Ávila y Guzmán, Marqués de Povar
- 1627 : Luis Ferrer de Cardona (Interim)
- 1628 : Luis Fajardo Requesens y Zúñiga, Marqués de los Vélez
- 1631 : Pedro Fajardo Requesens y Zúñiga, Marqués de los Vélez
- 1635 : Fernando de Borja y Aragón, Marqués de Esquilache
- 1640 : Federico Colonna, Príncipe de Butera
- 1641 : Antonio de la Cerda, 7th Duke of Medinaceli
- 1642 : Francisco de Borja, Duque de Gandia
- 1642 : Rodrigo Ponce de León, 4th Duke of Arcos
- 1645 : Duarte Fernando Álvarez de Toledo, Conde de Oropesa
- 1650 : Pedro de Urbina y Montoya, Archbishop of Valencia
- 1652 : Luis Guillem de Moncada, Duque de Montalto
- 1659 : Manuel Pérez de los Cobos, Marqués de Camarasa
- 1663 : Vicente de Gonzaga y Doria
- 1663 : Basilio de Castelví y Ponce (Interim)
- 1664 : Antonio Pedro Sancho Dávila y Osorio, Marquess of Astorga
- 1666 : Gaspar Felipe de Guzmán y Mejía, 2nd Marquis of Leganés (died 1666).
- 1667 : Diego Dávila Mesía y Guzmán, 3rd Marquis of Leganés
- 1669 : Vespasiano Manrique de Lara Gonzaga, Conde de Paredes
- 1675 : Francisco Idiáquez Butrón, Duque de Ciudad Real
- 1678 : Juan Tomás de Rocaberti, Archbishop of Valencia (1st time)
- 1679 : Pedro Manuel Colón de Portugal, Duque de Veragua
- 1680 : Rodrigo Manuel Fernández Manrique de Lara, Conde de Aguilar
- 1683 : Juan Tomás de Rocaberti (2nd time)
- 1683 : Pedro José de Silva, Conde de Cifuentes
- 1688 : Luis de Moscoso y de Osorio, Conde de Altamira
- 1691 : Carlos Homo Dei Moura y Pacheco, Marqués de Castel Rodrigo
- 1696 : Alfonso Pérez de Guzmán y Marañon
- 1700 : Antonio Domingo de Mendoza Caamaño y Sotomayor, Marqués de Villagarcía

== Viceroys named by Philip V of Spain ==
- 1705 : Joaquín Ponce de León
- 1706 : Cristóbal de Moscoso y Montemayor, Conde de las Torres
- 1707 : Luis Belluga Moncada, Bishop of Cartagena

== Viceroys named by Charles of Habsburg ==
- 1705 : Juan Bautista Basset y Ramos
- 1706 : Sancho Ruiz de Lihory, Count of Cardona
- 1706 : Diego Hurtado de Mendoza y Sandoval, Conde de la Corzana
