= Diego Hurtado de Mendoza, 1st Count of Melito =

Castilian general

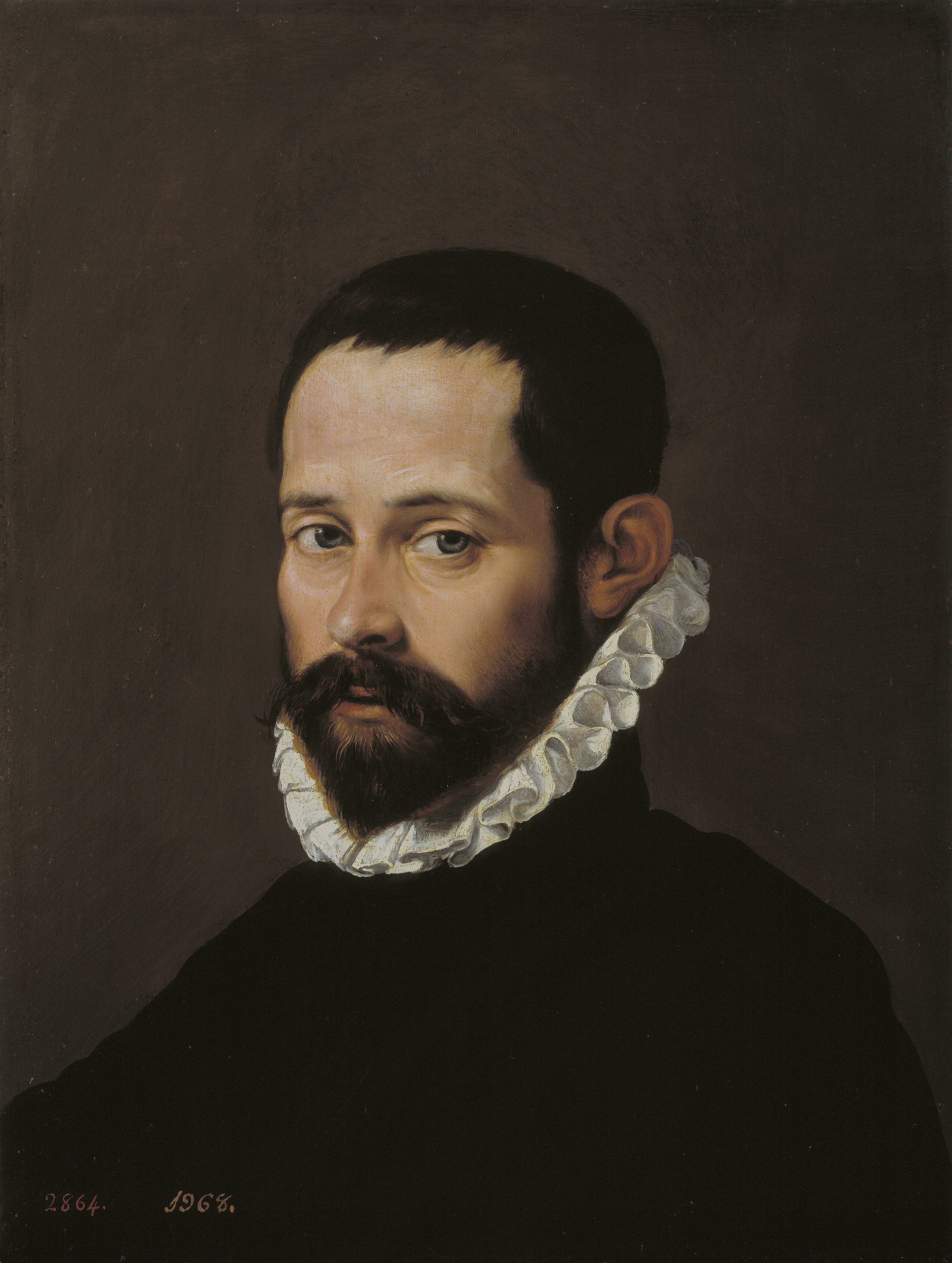
Retrato Diego Portrait

Diego Hurtado de Mendoza (in full, Spanish: Don Diego Hurtado de Mendoza y Lemos, primer conte di Melito e di Aliano, Gran Giustiziere del Regno di Napoli) (1469–1536) was a Castilian general and administrator. He served in the Italian Wars, and was later appointed Viceroy of Valencia where he fought the rebel Germanies in the Revolt of the Brotherhoods.

== Early life ==
Diego was the second son of Cardinal Pedro González de Mendoza and Mencia de Lemos (of the House of the Lords of Trofa, in Portugal), making him a member of the powerful Mendoza family. As Cardinal Mendoza was already a Cardinal, Diego was born out of wedlock. He was born on November 3, 1469, and raised in the castle of Manzanares el Real.

== Italian wars ==
He joined the army and fought in the Granada War. After it completed in 1492, Mendoza advanced in rank and served in the Second Italian war, where he distinguished himself serving under Gonzalo Fernández de Córdoba, "el Gran Capitán." He played an important role in the Battle of Ruvo and in the taking of Melito in the Kingdom of Naples, for which he was appointed Count of Mélito in 1506.

== As viceroy of Valencia ==
In 1520, he was appointed Viceroy of Valencia. Valencia was at the time unsettled by plague and flood, and the germanies (guilds) were taking control of the city of Valencia from the weak royal government there. Mendoza, a Castilian, was not well-received, and he provoked the Germanies by siding with the nobility and refusing to seat lawfully-elected representatives from the populace that favored the Germanies. The viceroy's palace was attacked, and only barely held out after two hours assault. Mendoza and the government fled into the countryside, and the open warfare phase of the Revolt of the Brotherhoods began. Mendoza was initially defeated by the agermanats at the Battle of Gandia in June 1521, but royalist troops triumphed elsewhere, and he eventually returned with reinforcements into the city of Valencia in November 1521. He acted with moderation against the defeated rebels, but the arrival in 1523 of the new Viceroy Germaine of Foix, widow of Ferdinand of Aragon, saw the punishment of the rebels intensify.

Diego was married to Ana de la Cerda y Castro, granddaughter of Gastón de la Cerda, 4th Count of Medinaceli. He died in Toledo in 1536.

== See also ==
- House of Mendoza
- Italian War of 1499–1504
- Revolt of the Brotherhoods

Government offices
New title	Viceroy of Valencia; 1520–1523	Succeeded by Germaine of Foix
Spanish nobility
New title	Count of Melito; 1506-1536	Succeeded by Diego; Hurtado de Mendoza
