= Pedro Fajardo, 1st Marquis of los Vélez =

Pedro Fajardo y Chacón, 1st Marquis of los Vélez, (Note: In full: In Spanish: Don Pedro Fajardo y Chacón Manrique de Lara, primer marqués de los Vélez, tercer señor de Cartagena, señor de Mula, Molina, Alhama, Librilla y Benitaglar, Adelantado mayor y capitán general del Reino de Murcia, alcaide de los Alcázares de las ciudades de Murcia, Lorca y marquesado de Villena, comendador de Caravaca y Comendador mayor de León.; (In English: [Don Pedro Fajardo y Chacón Manrique de Lara, first Marquis of los Vélez, third Lord of Cartagena, Lord of Mula, Molina, Alhama, Librilla and Benitaglar, Chief Warden and Captain General of the Kingdom of Murcia, warden of the Alcázares of the cities of Murcia, Lorca and Marquisate of Villena, Commander of Caravaca and Major Commander of León].)) Grandee of Spain, (c. 1478–1542), was a Spanish nobleman, soldier, and politician. His seat was at the Castillo de Vélez-Blanco.

== Biography ==
He was a son of don Juan Chacón and his wife dona Luisa Fajardo y Manrique de Lara, 2nd Countess and Lady of Cartagena.

Amongst other titles held by him, he was the 3rd Count and Lord of the City of Cartagena and the 7th Lord of Alhama, Mula, Librilla, Molina Seca, and La Puebla. He was Adelantado-Mayor and Captain-General of the Kingdom of Murcia, Commander of Caravaca and Trece (a councillor, lit. 'thirteen') of the Order of Santiago, on the Council of the Catholic Monarchs Ferdinand V and Isabel I of Castile.

He was created 1st Marquess of los Vélez with a coat of arms of Fajardo on 12 September 1507 by Joanna of Castile and 1st Count of Gagliano. He was also made Grandee of Spain First Class recognized by Charles I of Spain in 1520.

He was humiliated when in 1520, the vocal citizens of Mula made him swear to respect the privileges that Ferdinand III of Castile gave to the village. In this way the dispute against the Marquess over the municipal government council began. The Marquess pre-empted the situation with the construction of his fortress Castillo de los Vélez to make his rule over the people of Mula assured. He also ordered the construction of the Castillo de Vélez-Blanco between 1506–1513 and the Castillo de Cuevas del Almanzora from 1507.

In the Revolt of the Comuneros between 1520–1522 he first sympathized with the Comuneros, but finally sided with King Charles I of Spain in order to obtain the royal favor.

=== Marriage and children ===
He married firstly in 1499 to dona Madalena Manrique de Lara y d'Acuña, daughter of the 2nd Counts of Paredes de Nava, and maternal granddaughter of the 1st Counts of Buendía, divorced in 1507 without issue.

He married secondly in 1508 to Dona Mencía de la Cueva (died 1517), daughter of Don Francisco Fernández de la Cueva, 2nd Duke of Alburquerque and wife Dona Francisca Alvarez de Toledo and had an only son

- Luis Ybáñez Fajardo de la Cueva.

He married thirdly in 1520 dona Catalina de Silva, daughter of the 3rd Counts of Cifuentes (don Juan de Silva and Dona Catalina de Toledo, sister of the 2nd Count of Oropesa). Into this marriage were born five sons and seven daughters, including:

- Don Juan Fajardo, maestre de campo en La Calahorra, married dona Catalina de Ávalos or Dávalos, had issue.
- Padre Jesús Diego Fajardo Dávalos, a Jesuit priest.

== Notes ==
Spanish nobility
New title	Marquis of Los Vélez; 1507–1542	Succeeded by Luis Fajardo
