= Germania (guild) =

Guilds of artisans in the Kingdom of Valencia in Spain

Germanies (in Catalan; literally "brotherhoods") were guilds of artisans in the Kingdom of Valencia in Spain. Each germania ([dʒeɾmaˈni.a]) represented a single trade. The germanies are similar to the hermandades (also "brotherhoods", but in Castilian Spanish) of Castile, which were paramilitary law-enforcement militias. Similar to the hermandades, the Germanies at times took up arms to defend Valencia against raids from the Barbary pirates, but this privilege was revoked and the Germanies suppressed after they revolted against the royal government of King Charles I of Spain.

== Revolt ==
The germanies began to take power in Valencia in 1519 after an outbreak of the plague, and the situation degenerated to open warfare between the Germanies and the Crown by 1520. The previous king, Ferdinand of Aragon, had granted permission for the Germanies to take up arms shortly before his death, but the Valencian nobles had mostly quashed this possibility, fearing the Germanies would gain political power if they could back their demands with force. King Charles I, however, issued an edict legalizing the Germanies to take up arms in 1519, which allowed the Germanies to strike back at the royal government after the new Viceroy of Valencia refused to seat elected representatives friendly to the Germanies.

The Germanies were defeated after a year of warfare and another year of guerrilla raids from the countryside. Their leaders were executed as traitors and the Germanies were banned.

== See also ==
- Hermandad
