= Kingdom of Valencia =

State on the Mediterranean coast of Iberia (1238–1707)

Kingdom of Valencia: Regne de València (Valencian); Reino de Valencia (Spanish); Regnum Valentiae (Latin)
- 1238–1707
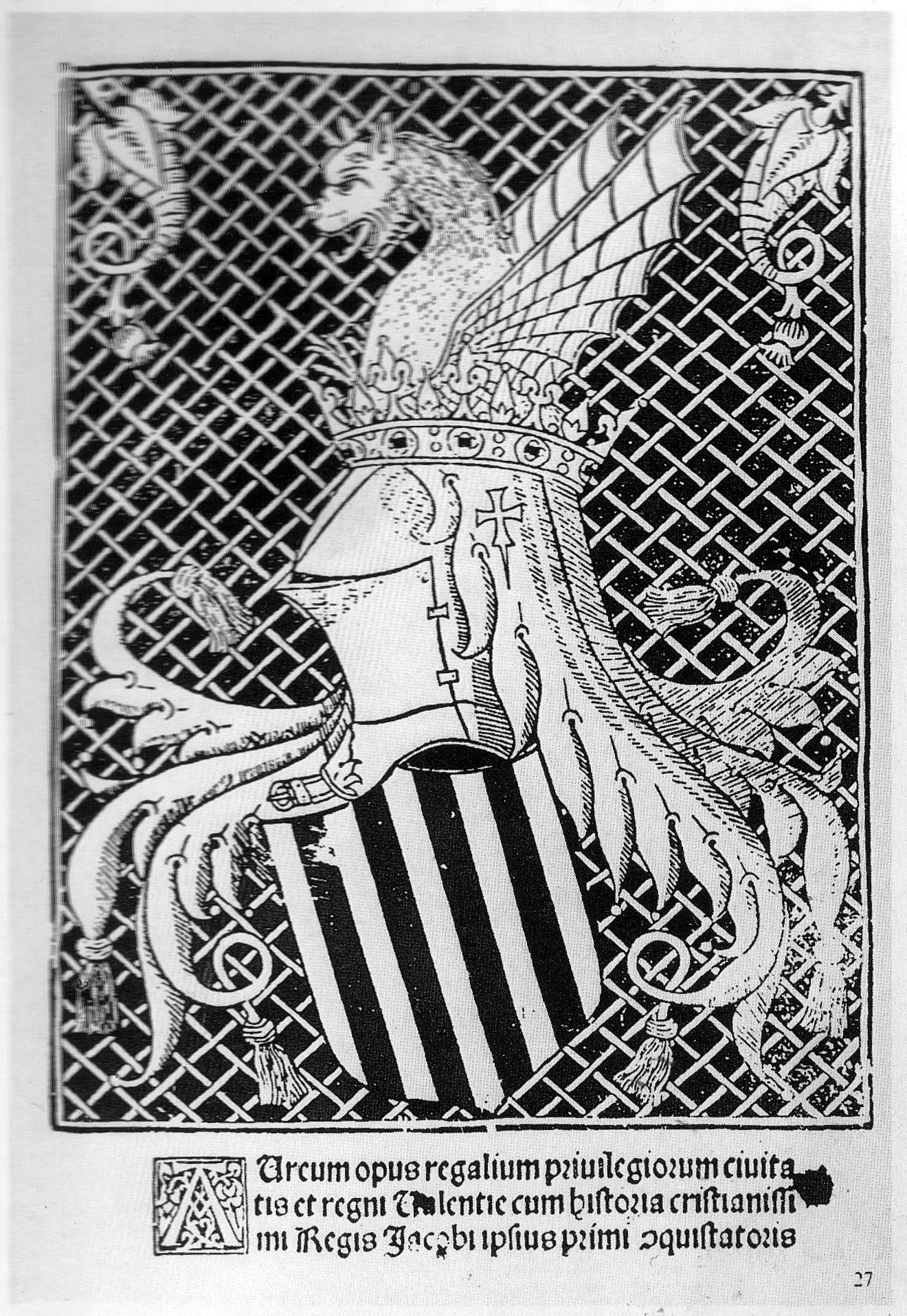
- Associated emblem

- Kingdom of Valencia and its administrative structure
- Status: Realm of the Crown of Aragon
- Capital: Valencia
- Common languages: Valencian, Aragonese, Castilian, Andalusi Arabic and Latin
- Religion: Majority religion: Roman Catholicism (official); Minority religions: Islam, Judaism
- Government: Monarchy
- King
  - First: James I of Aragon
  - Last: Philip V of Spain
- Legislature: Valencian Courts
- Historical era: Medieval / Early modern
  - Established: 1238
  - Nueva Planta decrees: 1707
Preceded by	Succeeded by
Taifa of Valencia; Taifa of Dénia	Bourbon Spain
- Today part of: Spain

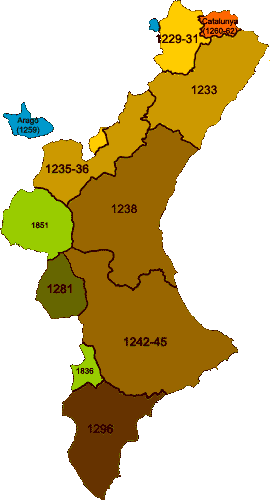
Christian conquest of the Emirates of Valencia and Dénia (brown shades); 19th century additions to the present day Valencian Community (green) do not belong to the historic kingdom; the Biar-Busot line formed the southern border of the kingdom until 1296

The Kingdom of Valencia, (Note: (Valencian: Regne de València; Spanish: Reino de Valencia; Latin: Regnum Valentiae),Modern pronunciation: Valencian: [ˈreŋne ðe vaˈlensia] Spanish: [ˈrejno ðe βaˈlenθja]) located on the eastern coast of the Iberian Peninsula, was one of the component realms of the Crown of Aragon.

The Kingdom of Valencia was formally created in 1238 when the Moorish taifa of Valencia was taken in the course of the Reconquista. It was dissolved, alongside the other components of the old crown of Aragon, by Philip V of Spain in 1707, by means of the Nueva Planta decrees, as a result of the Spanish War of Succession.

During its existence, the Kingdom of Valencia was ruled by the laws and institutions stated in the Furs (charters) of Valencia; these charters granted it wide self-government under the Crown of Aragon and, later on, under the Spanish Monarchy.

The boundaries and identity of the present Spanish autonomous community of the Valencian Community are essentially those of the former Kingdom of Valencia.

== Reconquest ==
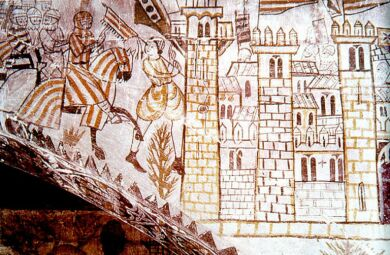
King James I entered the city of Valencia on 9 October 1238

The conquest of what would later become the Kingdom of Valencia started in 1232 when the king of the Crown of Aragon, James I, called Jaume I el Conqueridor (the Conqueror), took Morella, mostly with Aragonese troops. Shortly after, in 1233, Borriana and Peniscola were also taken from the بلنسية Balansiyya (Valencia in the Arabic language) taifa.

A second and more relevant wave of expansion took place in 1238, when James I defeated the Moors from the Balansiya taifa. He entered the city of Valencia on 9 October 1238, which is regarded as the dawn of the Kingdom of Valencia.

A third phase started in 1243 and ended in 1245, when it met the limits agreed between James I and the heir to the throne of Castile, Alfonso the Wise, who would succeed to the throne as Alfonso X in 1252. These limits were traced in the Treaty of Almizra between the Crown of Castile and the Crown of Aragon, which coordinated their Reconquista efforts to drive the Moors southward by establishing their respectively desired areas of influence. The Treaty of Almizra established the south line of Aragonese expansion in the line formed by the villes of Biar and Busot, today in the north of the Alicante province. Everything south of that line, including what would be the Kingdom of Murcia, was reserved by means of this treaty for Castile.

The matter of the large majority of Mudéjar (Muslim) population, left behind from the progressively more southern combat front, lingered from the very beginning until they finally were expelled en masse in 1609. Up to that moment, they represented a complicated issue for the newly established Kingdom, as they were essential to keep the economy working due to their numbers, which inspired frequent pacts with local Muslim populations, such as Mohammad Abu Abdallah Ben Hudzail al Sahuir, allowing their culture various degrees of tolerance but, on the other side, they were deemed as a menace to the Kingdom due to their lack of allegiance and their real or perceived conspiracies to bring the Ottoman Empire to their rescue.

There were frequent rebellions from the Moor population against Christian rule, the most threatening being those headed by the Moor chieftain Mohammad Abu Abdallah Ben Hudzail al Sahuir, also known as Al-Azraq. He led important rebellions in 1244, 1248 and 1276. During the first of these, he briefly regained Muslim independence for the lands South of the Júcar, but he had to surrender soon after. During the second revolt, King James I was almost killed in battle, but Al-Azraq also was finally subjugated, his life spared only because of a longtime relationship with the Christian monarch. During the third rebellion, Al-Azraq himself was killed but his son would continue to promote Muslim unrest and local rebellions remained always at sight.

James II called Jaume II el Just or the Just, a grandson of James I, initiated in 1296 a final push of his army further southwards than the Biar-Busot pacts. His campaign aimed at the fertile countryside around Murcia and the Vega Baja del Segura whose local Muslim rulers were bound by pacts with Castile and governing by proxy on behalf of this kingdom; Castilian troops often raided the area to assert a sovereignty which, in any case, was not stable but was characterized by the typical skirmishes and ever changing alliances of a frontier territory.

The campaign under James II was successful to the point of extending the limits of the Kingdom of Valencia well south of the previously agreed border with Castile. His troops took Orihuela and Murcia. What was to become the definite dividing line between Castile and the Crown of Aragon was finally agreed by virtue of the Sentencia Arbitral de Torrellas (1304), amended by the Treaty of Elche (1305), which assigned Orihuela (also Alicante and Elche) to the Kingdom of Valencia, while Murcia went to the Crown of Castile, so drawing the final Southern border of the Kingdom of Valencia.

At the end of the process, four taifas had been wiped out: Balansiya, Alpuente, Denia and Murcia. Taking into account the standards of the day, it can be considered as a rather rapid conquest, since most of the territory was gained in less than fifty years and the maximum expansion was completed in less than one century. The toll in terms of social and politic unrest which was to be paid for this fast process was the existence of a large Muslim population within the Kingdom which neither desired to become a part of it nor, as long as they remained Muslim, was given the chance to.

== Forging ==
Modern historiography sees the conquest of Valencia in the light of similar Reconquista efforts by the Crown of Castile, i.e., as a fight led by the king in order to gain new territories as free as possible of a serfdom subject to the nobility. The new territories would then be accountable only to the king, thus enlarging and consolidating his power versus that of the nobility. This development was part of a growing trend evident in the Middle Ages (said to end in 1492 with the final acts of the Reconquista in the capitulation of Kingdom of Granada and the expulsion of the Jews as well as Christopher Columbus's discovery of the Americas for Spain) and well into the era of Habsburg Spain. It is by this historiographical approach that the repopulation of the Kingdom is assessed today. The Kingdom was initially overwhelmingly populated by Muslims and often subject to popular revolts and the serious threat of subjugation by any Muslim army assembled for this purpose in the Maghreb.

The process by which the monarchy strove to free itself from any noble guardianship was not an easy one, as the nobility still held a large share of power and was determined to retain as much of it as possible. This fact marked the Christian colonization of the newly acquired territories, governed under the Lleis de Repartiments. Finally the Aragonese nobles were granted several domains, but they managed to obtain only the interior lands, mostly mountainous and sparsely populated parts of the Kingdom of Valencia. The king reserved the fertile and more densely populated lands in the coastal plains for free citizens and the incipient bourgeoisie, whose cities were given the Furs, or royal charters, regulating civil law and administration locally, but holding them always accountable to the king.

=== Linguistic outcome ===
These facts had linguistic consequences, which are traditionally sketched this way:

- The interior would have been mostly repopulated by people coming from the kingdom of Aragon, speakers of some variety of the old Aragonese language, a Western Romance language. Their language was a close relative of the Mozarabic language and of the Old Castilian language, from which the modern Spanish language stems.
- The coastal lands would have been mostly repopulated by speakers of the Catalan language from the Principality of Catalonia. This was one of the Occitano-Romance languages. In this traditional view, the language of these settlers replaced entirely the previous languages and became modern Valencian, generally considered a variant of Catalan.

A few authors have promoted an alternative view, in which the languages of the conquerors were mixed with a local Romance (Mozarabic) which was already similar to Catalan. No solid evidence for this view has been found.

== Height of power ==
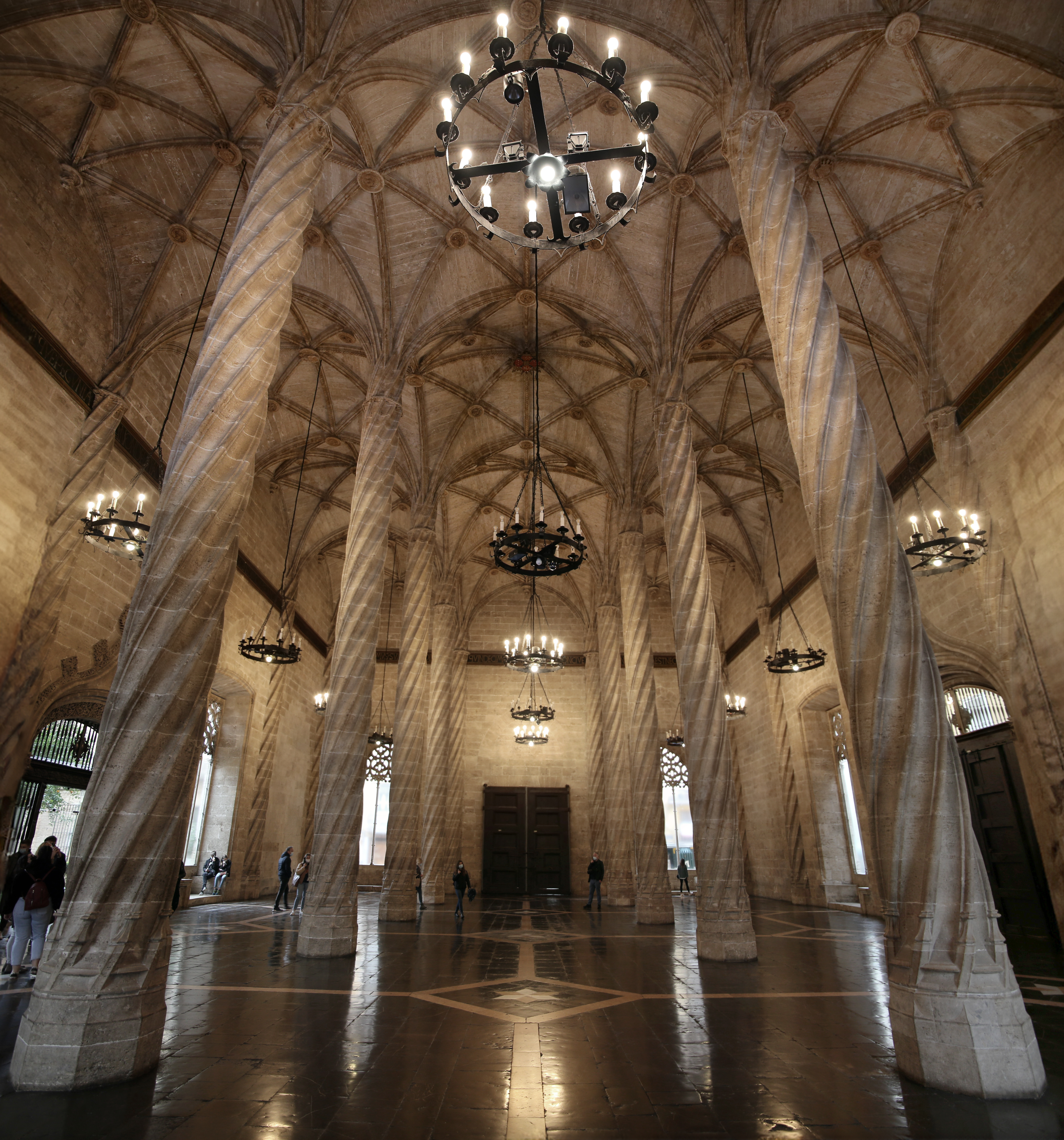
The Contract Hall in La Llotja de la Seda

The Kingdom of Valencia achieved its height during the early 15th century. The economy was prosperous and centered around trading through the Mediterranean, which had become increasingly controlled by the Crown of Aragon, mostly from the ports of Valencia and Barcelona.

The Taula de canvi was created in the city of Valencia, functioning partly as a bank and partly as a stock exchange market. The local industry, especially textile manufactures, achieved greater development as a result and the city of Valencia turned into a Mediterranean trading emporium where traders from all Europe worked. The Silk Exchange, is a significant example of civil Gothic architecture and was a major trade market in the Mediterranean by the end of the 15th century and throughout the 16th century.

Valencia was one of the first cities in Europe to install a movable type printing press as per the designs of Johannes Gutenberg. Valencian authors such as Joanot Martorell or Ausiàs March conformed the canon of classic Valencian literature to the Valencian.

== Modern Era, the Germanies, and decay ==
In 1479, Ferdinand ascended the throne as King of Aragon. With his earlier marriage to Queen Isabella I of Castile, the modern Kingdom of Spain was born. Valencia began a slow process of integration with the rest of Spain. When Ferdinand and Isabella's grandson Charles came to the throne, the crowns were permanently joined in personal union. The kings of Habsburg Spain (January 23, 1516 – November 1, 1700) maintained the privileges and liberties of the territories and cities which formed the kingdom and its legal structure and factuality remained intact. A new position, Viceroy of Valencia, was created to manage the officially independent Kingdom.

Coat of arms of Valencia in the 14th century

Meanwhile, the rising Spanish Empire had left behind its former status as a Kingdom of the Iberian Peninsula and had emerged as a Great power. The Empire shifted its focus to the Spanish colonization of the Americas and its possessions in Europe, rather than its Iberian territories.

During the 16th century, Valencia lost its status as a preeminent commercial center of Europe to the rapidly developing cities of Northern and Central Europe. Within Spain, the Atlantic trade favored the cities of Andalusia such as Cádiz. This was largely due to diminishing profits from the Mediterranean trade. The Spanish Empire was in frequent conflict with the Ottoman Empire which controlled most of the eastern Mediterranean. They prevented each other from reaching certain ports while Ottoman privateers such as Barbarossa preyed on trade ships. The Barbary pirates such as Dragut, operating out of Tunis, Tripoli, Algiers, Salé and ports in Morocco, attacked shipping in the western Mediterranean, which included destructive raids in Christian ports along the coast. This decline in trade greatly inhibited the economy in Valencia, which had already been economically affected by the Alhambra decree which had expelled the Jews in 1492.

In 1519, the young King Charles I granted the Germanies (literally "brotherhoods") permission to arm themselves to fight off the Muslim raiders. The Germanies were artisan guilds who also, at first with the government's permission, served as civilian militias to fight raiding pirates. However, the Germanies also had an economic agenda favoring the commoner-dominated guilds that clashed with the aristocracy. After the recently appointed Viceroy of Valencia Diego Hurtado de Mendoza refused to seat elected officials who favored the Germanies in 1520, a full-fledged revolt broke out, the Revolt of the Brotherhoods (Revolta de les Germanies). It lasted well into 1522, and shared many traits with the contemporaneous Revolt of the Comuneros in Castile. Aside from economic resentment of the aristocracy, the revolt also featured a strong anti-Muslim aspect, as the superstitious populace blamed Muslims for a plague that struck the city. The mudéjars (Muslims) were seen as allies of the aristocracy, as they worked in the nobility's large farms and undercut the Valencians on wages making them competitors for scarce jobs. During the revolt, the agermanats killed many Muslims and forcibly baptized the rest. Even after the Germanies were suppressed it was ruled that these baptisms were valid, sparking a new revolt of the Moriscos (Muslim "converts").

Modern boundaries within Spain of the Valencian Community

Because of the exhausted forces left after clashes between the nobles and their allies in the high bourgeoisie versus the general populace and the lesser bourgeoisie, the king was able to use the power vacuum to enlarge his share of power and gradually diminish that of the local authorities. This meant that his requests for money in order to enlarge or consolidate the disputed possessions in Europe were progressively more frequent, more imperative and, conversely, less reciprocated for the Kingdom of Valencia, just as they were elsewhere for the rest of the Spanish Kingdom territories.

The expulsion of the Moriscos in 1609 was the final blow for the economy of the Kingdom of Valencia, as tens of thousands of people—mostly peasants serving the nobility—were forced to leave; in the process, entire villages were deserted and the countryside lost its main labor force. Some 125,000 people are supposed to have left the land. The expulsion was broadly welcome within the Valencian citizenry, especially for its more popular segments. The expulsion meant the loss of a cheap labor force for the nobility, and consequently a massive socio-economic destabilisation. The nobles together with the upper class bourgeoisie felt threatened by an increasingly self-confident general populace, and sought the king's protection of their privileges. As a concession to the monarchy, they had to gradually relinquish their check and balance role on its power, which had been one of the distinguishing traits of the Kingdom's autonomy before the Crown. In line with similar processes in other parts of feudal Europe, the power vacuum left by rapid socio-economic change was readily filled by an increasingly emboldened monarchy.

The Kingdom of Valencia as a legal and political entity was finally ended in 1707 as a result of the Spanish War of Succession. The local population mostly took the side of and provided troops and resources for Archduke Charles, the pretender who was arguably to maintain the legal status quo. His utter defeat at the Battle of Almansa, near the borders of the Kingdom of Valencia, meant its legal and political termination, along with other autonomous parliaments in the Crown of Aragon, as the Nueva Planta Decrees were passed and the new King Philip V of Spain of the House of Bourbon created a centralized Spain.

== See also ==
- Conquest of Valencia by El Cid
- List of Valencian monarchs
- Generalitat Valenciana
- Valencian Parliament
- Palace of the Borgias
