= María Tomasa Palafox, Marquise of Villafranca =

Spanish art patron and muse

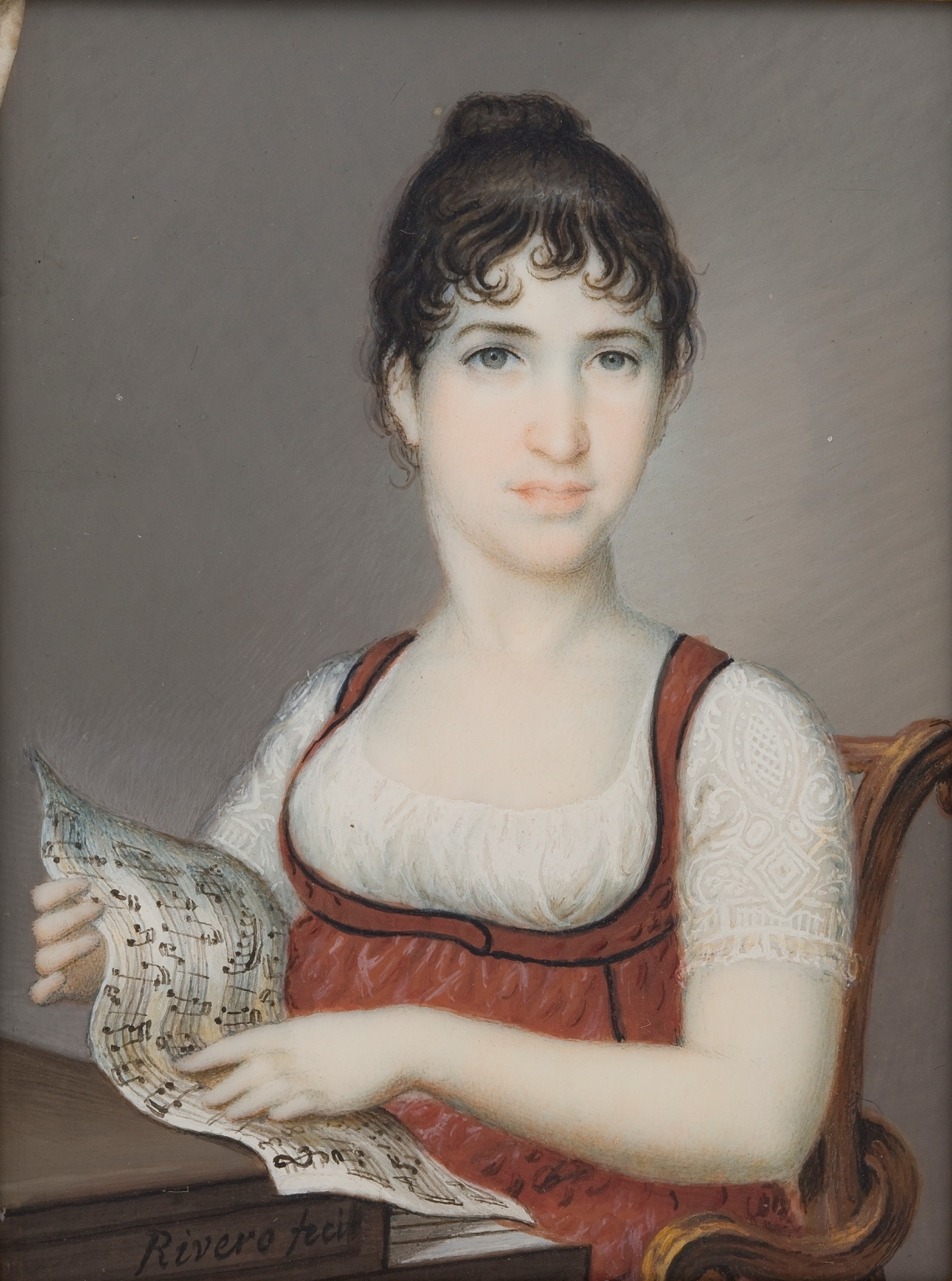
The Marchioness of Villafranca, painted by José Alonso del Rivero

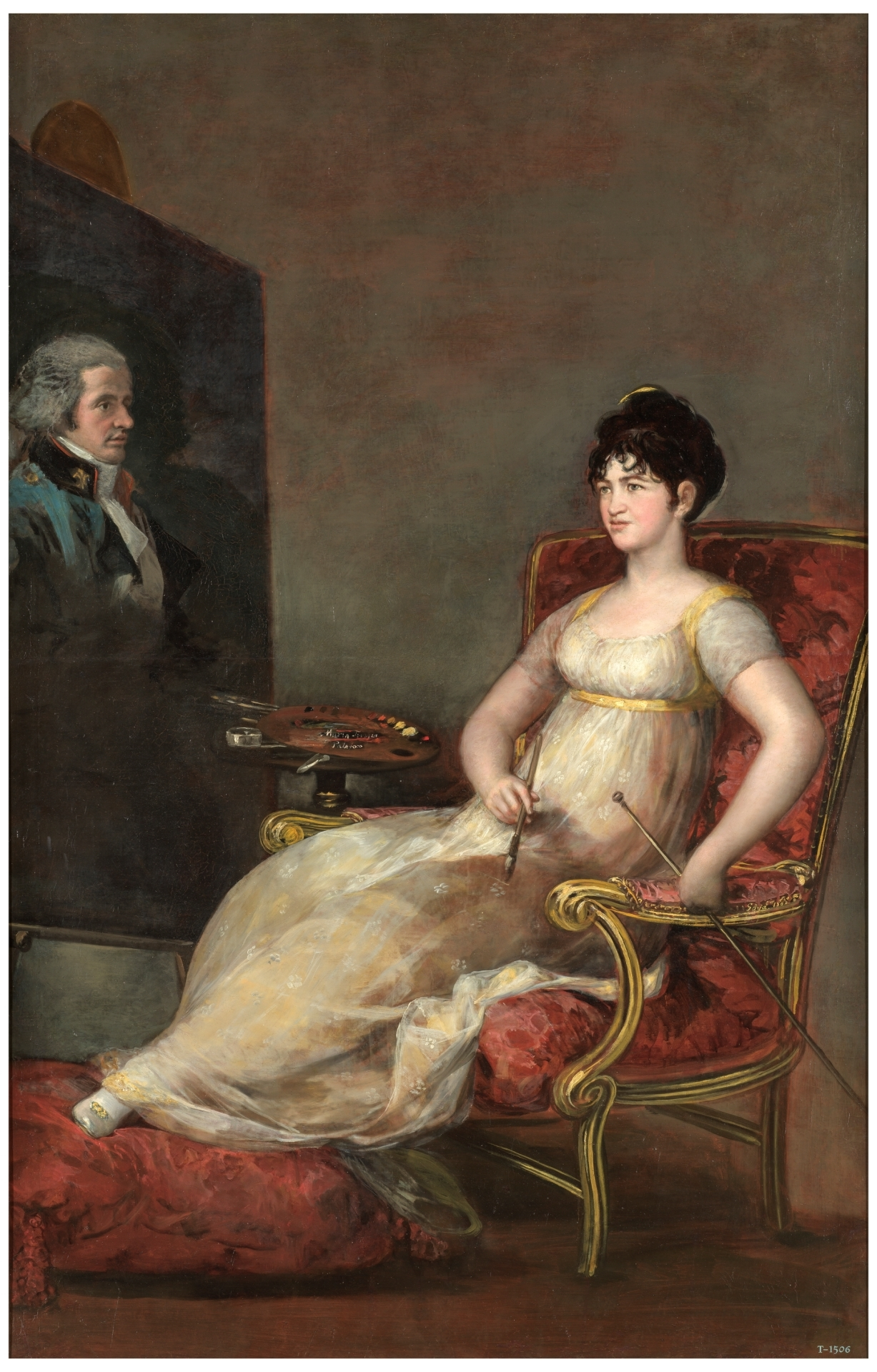
The Marchioness of Villafranca, painted by Goya

Doña María Tomasa Palafox y Portocarrero, Marchioness of Villafranca and Duchess of Medina Sidonia (1780–1835), was a patron and muse of the painter Francisco de Goya y Lucientes and the wife of Francisco de Borja Álvarez de Toledo, 12th Marquis of Villafranca.

== Biography ==
She was the daughter of the Counts of Montijo. Her brothers were Eugenio and Cipriano Palafox. Her mother, María Francisca de Sales y Portocarrero oversaw her daughter’s education. It was an exceptionally thorough upbringing for the time.
In 1798, Tomasa married Francisco de Borja Álvarez de Toledo (1763–1821). He became Duke of Medina Sidonia, when his elder brother died without issue in 1796. Nevertheless, the couple frequently used the title of Marquis of Villafranca, which Francisco had inherited through his paternal line.

Tomasa distinguished herself through her work with the Sociedad Económica Matritense (Madrid Economic Society), an institution she joined in 1799. Following in her mother’s footsteps, she took a keen interest in the plight of children in foundling hospitals and in the education of girls, showing particular interest in the adoption of the Lancasterian pedagogical system.

During the Peninsular War, the couple settled in Cádiz. Here, Tomasa became president of the Patriotic Society of Ladies of Ferdinand VII ("Sociedad Patriótica de Señoras de Fernando VII"). This organization, composed of women from the aristocracy and the bourgeoisie of Cádiz, was dedicated to raising funds and coordinating the production of supplies and uniforms for soldiers, thereby offering a model for how women could engage in public life. The Marchioness delivered the opening address, demonstrating the fervent patriotism of these women and establishing both the legitimacy and the clear utility of their actions.

The period 1810-1812 saw the highest level of activity, during the French Siege of Cádiz. In 1813, Tomasa returned to Madrid, where she continued her work in support of King Ferdinand’s armies. In 1815, Ferdinand VII dissolved the society, though he did acknowledge the courage and patriotism the ladies had shown. In 1818 Tomasa assumed the presidency of the Junta de Damas (Ladies' Board) of Madrid and dedicated herself intensely to the aforementioned philanthropic endeavors.

After her husband had passed away in Madrid in 1821, she remarried in Naples in 1824. Her new husband was José Álvarez de Toledo y Dubois, a relative of her late husband, an army brigadier, and a minister plenipotentiary to Bavaria, who was also 44 years old and a bachelor. In her final years, she traveled with her new husband to the family’s estates in Italy to reunite with her son, Pedro, the heir to the title. At the time, Pedro was embroiled in a conflict with the King due to his support for the pretender, Don Carlos, Count of Molina. The Marchioness of Villafranca died in the city of Naples in 1835, at the age of fifty-five.

== Painting by Goya (1804) ==
In his famous painting, Goya portrays the Marchioness de Villafranca as an artist with brush and maulstick in her hand. She has interrupted her work at the easel and leaning back in her armchair, she is scrutinising her model, her husband—invisible to the viewer—who is posing for his portrait. He must have been seated facing sideways with his profile to the artist, unable to turn the attention to his wife until the picture was done. Goya honoured his aristocratic "colleague" with the inscription of her name on the palette; he himself signed his work with his signature on the arm of the chair. The marchioness, who is fashionably dressed in the Empire style, was certainly more than just a dabbler in art. She was an honorary member of the Madrid Academy, which also honoured her with an award.

== Children ==
From her marriage to the Marquis of Villafranca, she had 9 children :

- Francisco Álvarez de Toledo y Palafox (1799–1816), who became the 10th Duke of Fernandina before he died aged 16.
- María Teresa Alvarez de Toledo y Palafox (1801–1866), who married Joaquín Florencio Cavero de Ahones y Tarazona, 6th Count of Sobradiel.
- Pedro de Alcántara Álvarez de Toledo y Palafox (1803–1867), who married María Joaquina del Pilar Silva y Téllez Girón, a daughter of José Gabriel de Silva-Bazán, 10th Marquis of Santa Cruz and Joaquina Téllez-Girón, 2nd Countess of Osilo, in 1822.
- Maria del Rosario Tomasa Álvarez de Toledo y Palafox (1805–1870), who married Pedro Caro y Salas, 4th Marquis of La Romana, son of General Pedro Caro Sureda, 3rd Marquis of La Romana and Dionisia de Salas y Boixadors, in 1826.
- José María Alvarez de Toledo y Palafox (1812–1885), a twin; he married María del Carmen Lucía de Acuña y Dewitte, 9th Marchioness of Casa Fuerte, a daughter of Manuel Lorenzo de Acuña, 10th Marquess of Bedmar, and María Antónia Antonia de Witte (a daughter of Carlos José de Witte y Pau), in 1837.
- Ignacio Álvarez de Toledo Palafox (1812–1878), a twin; Maestrante of Sevilla.

== Ancestors ==
Ancestors of María Tomasa Palafox

16. Francisco de Palafox, 4th Marquis of Ariza
8. Juan António de Palafox, 5th Marquis of Ariza
17. Francisca de Zúñiga
4. Joaquin Ximenes de Palafox, 6th Marquis of Ariza
18. Cecilio Francisco Centurión, 4th Marquis of Estepa
9. Francisca de Paula Centurión, 4th Marchioness of Almuña
19. Luisa Antonia Mesía Carrillo, 7th Marchioness of La Guardia
2. Felipe Antonio de Palafox y Croÿ de Havré, Marquis of Ariza
20. Ferdinand François Joseph Croÿ, 3rd Duke of Havré
10. Jean-Baptiste de Croÿ, 5th Duke of Havré
21. Marie Josephe Barbe de Halewijn
5. Maria Ana Carlota de Croÿ
22. Antonio Lante Montefeltro della Rovere, 1st Prince of Belmonte
11. Maria Anna Lante Montefeltro della Rovere
23. Louise Angélique de La Trémoille
1. María Tomasa Palafox
24. Cristóbal Portocarrero, 4th Count of Montijo
12. Cristóbal Portocarrero, 5th Count of Montijo
25. María Regalado Funes, 4th Marchioness of Osera
6. Cristóbal Portocarrero, 6th Marquis of Valderrábano
26. Antonio Melchor Fernández de Córdoba y Figueroa
13. María Dominga Fernández de Córdoba y Portocarrero
27. Catalina Portocarrero de Guzmán, 11th Marchioness of Ardales
3. María Francisca de Sales Portocarrero de Guzmán, Countess of Montijo
28. Joaquin José de Zúñiga, 8th Duke of Peñaranda de Duero
14. António López de Zúñiga, 9th Duke of Peñaranda
29. Isabel Rosa de Ayala Fonseca Toledo
7. María Josefa Marcos López de Zúñiga
30. Manuel Gaspar de Sandoval Téllez-Girón, 5th Duke of Uceda
15. María Teresa Pacheco Toledo y Sandoval
31. Josefa Antonia Álvarez de Toledo
