= Francisco de Borja Álvarez de Toledo, 12th Marquis of Villafranca =

Spanish nobleman

Francisco Álvarez de Toledo
- Duke of Medina Sidonia, Marquess of Villafranca (etc...)
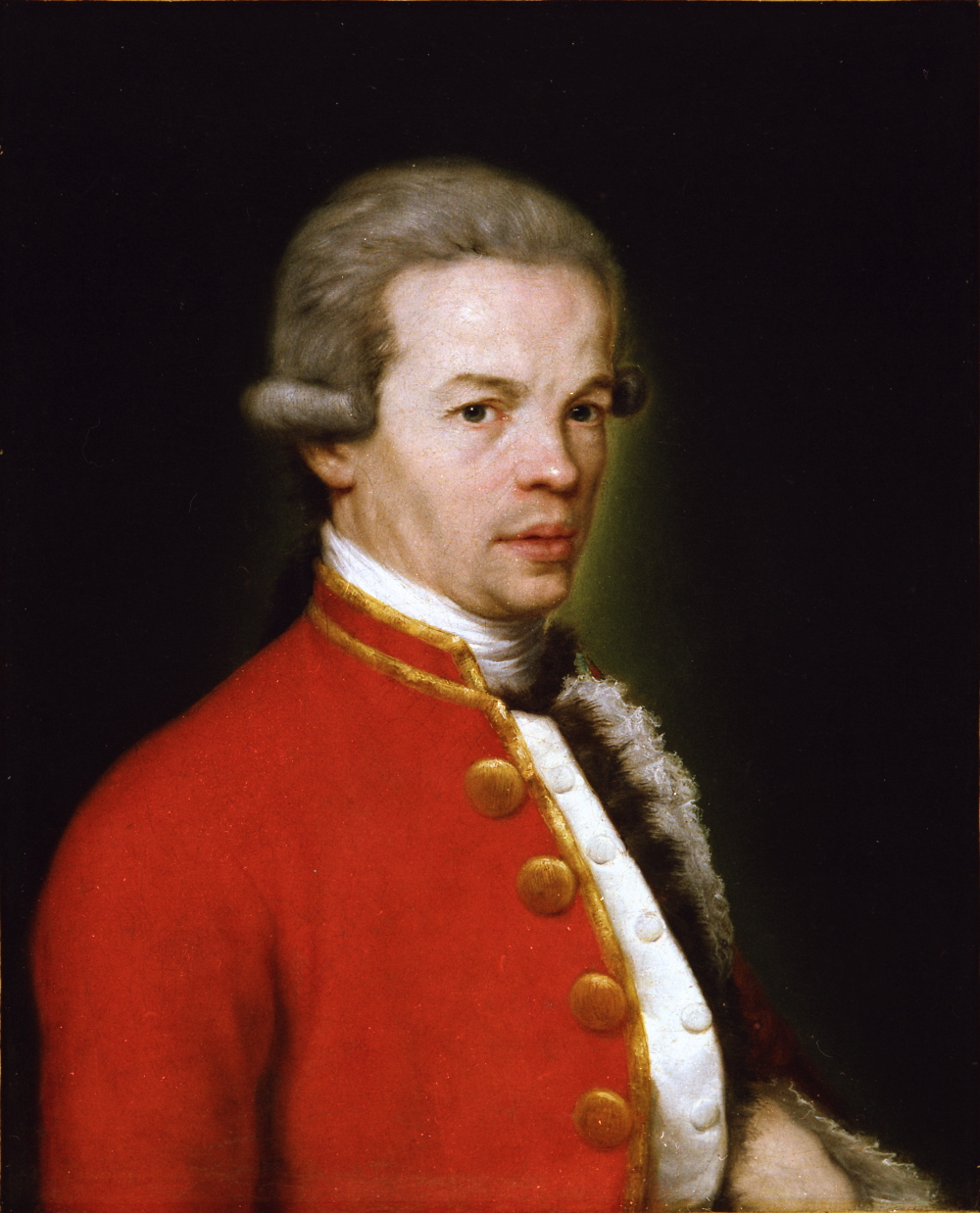
- Portrait of the 12th Marquess of Villafranca, c. 1800
- Born: 9 June 1763; Madrid, Spain
- Died: 12 February 1821 (aged 57)
- Noble family: House of Toledo
- Spouse: María Tomasa Palafox y Portocarrero (m. 1798; died 1821)
- Father: Antonio Álvarez de Toledo
- Mother: Maria Antonia Gonzaga

Francisco de Borja Álvarez de Toledo y Gonzaga, 12th Marquis of Villafranca (9 June 1763 – 12 February 1821) inherited the title of Marquis of Villafranca and Duke of Medina Sidonia from his elder brother José Álvarez de Toledo, Duke of Alba in 1796, as well as becoming the 14th Marquis of Cazaza, 10th Duke of Bivona and 12th Marquis of Los Vélez.

== Early life ==
Álvarez de Toledo was born on 9 June 1763 in Madrid, Spain. He was a younger son of Antonio Álvarez de Toledo, 10th Marquis of Villafranca del Bierzo and Princess Maria Antonia Gonzaga y Caracciolo. Among his siblings was elder brother, José Álvarez de Toledo, jure uxoris Duke of Alba (from his marriage to María del Pilar Teresa Cayetana de Silva y Álvarez de Toledo, 13th Duchess of Alba), Pedro de Alcántara Álvarez de Toledo, Count of Miranda (who married María del Carmen Josefa de Zúñiga, 13th Duchess of Peñaranda), Maria Ignacia Alvarez de Toledo (who married Vicente Osorio de Moscoso, 15th Duke of Maqueda), and María de la Encarnación Álvarez de Toledo (who married Juan de la Cruz Bellvís de Moncada, 9th Marquess of Villamayor de las Ibernias, 4th Marquess of San Juan de Piedras Albas).

His paternal grandparents were Fadrique Vicente de Toledo Osorio, 9th Marquis of Villafranca and Juana Pérez de Guzmán y Silva (a daughter of Manuel Pérez de Guzmán, 12th Duke of Medina Sidonia). His maternal grandparents were Francesco Gonzaga, 1st Duke of Solferino (a son of Ferdinando Gonzaga, 3rd Prince of Castiglione) and Giulia Caracciolo di Santo Buono (a daughter of Carmine Caracciolo, 5th Prince of Santo Buono).

== Career ==
Upon the death of his elder brother, José Álvarez de Toledo on 9 June 1796, he became the 16th Duke of Medina Sidonia, 13th Duke of Montalto, 10th Duke of Bivona, 9th Duke of Fernandina, 14th Marquis of Cazaza, 12th Marquis of Villafranca, and 12th Marquis of Los Vélez.

After his marriage, he was appointed head equerry to the Princess of Asturias, María Antonia of Naples, the first wife of the future King Ferdinand VII.

=== Military career ===
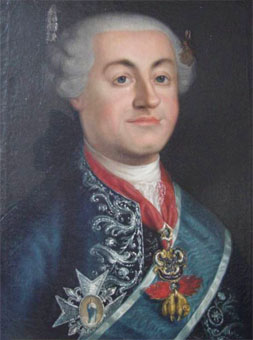
The 16th Duke of Medina Sidonia

He joined the Royal Spanish Guards Regiment as a cadet on 19 August 1782, and was promoted to Second lieutenant of the Rifles on 23 June 1785 and, again, on 21 May 1789. Two years later he distinguished himself in 1791 in the defense of Oran, receiving the rank of Lieutenant colonel on 5 October 1791.

Álvarez took part in the War of the Pyrenees, being stationed in the army of Roussillon from 26 April 1793, distinguishing himself in the Battle of Mas Deu on 19 May 1793, for which he was promoted to First lieutenant of the Rifles. He fought in the Battle of Perpignan on 17 July and in the retreat from Argeles to the Coll de Banyuls, serving in the first battalion. On December 2 1793, he was appointed Colonel attached to the Guadalajara Infantry Regiment, with which he was at the Battle of San Lorenzo de la Muga on August 13, 1794 and in the Battle of the Black Mountain at Montroig on September 21, as well as in the defense of the Figueras lines from November 17 to 20. At the end of the war, he was promoted to Infantry Brigadier on 4 September 1795, and the following month he was given command of the Princess Infantry Regiment, a position he held until February 2, 1798, when he was promoted to Field Marshal.

At the beginning of the Peninsular War, being the major advance guard of the Kingdom of Murcia, he was named General Commander of the kingdom by a popular uprising on 26 December 1808, an appointment that was confirmed days later by the Central Board. In addition, he was a member of the Superior Board of Murcia, until the arrival of General Horace François Bastien Sébastiani de La Porta's troops on 24 April 1810, having to flee and take refuge in Alicante. In September 1810, he was elected Deputy to the Cortes of Cádiz, where he was named member of the War Commission.

Upon the return of King Ferdinand VII, he was appointed gentleman of the chamber and on 9 February 1816, head equerry to the Queen, going to Cádiz, together with the Duke of the Infantado, to receive the Portuguese princesses. In that year, he was awarded the Grand Cross of the Order of Charles III and promoted to Lieutenant general on 14 October 1816.

== Personal life ==
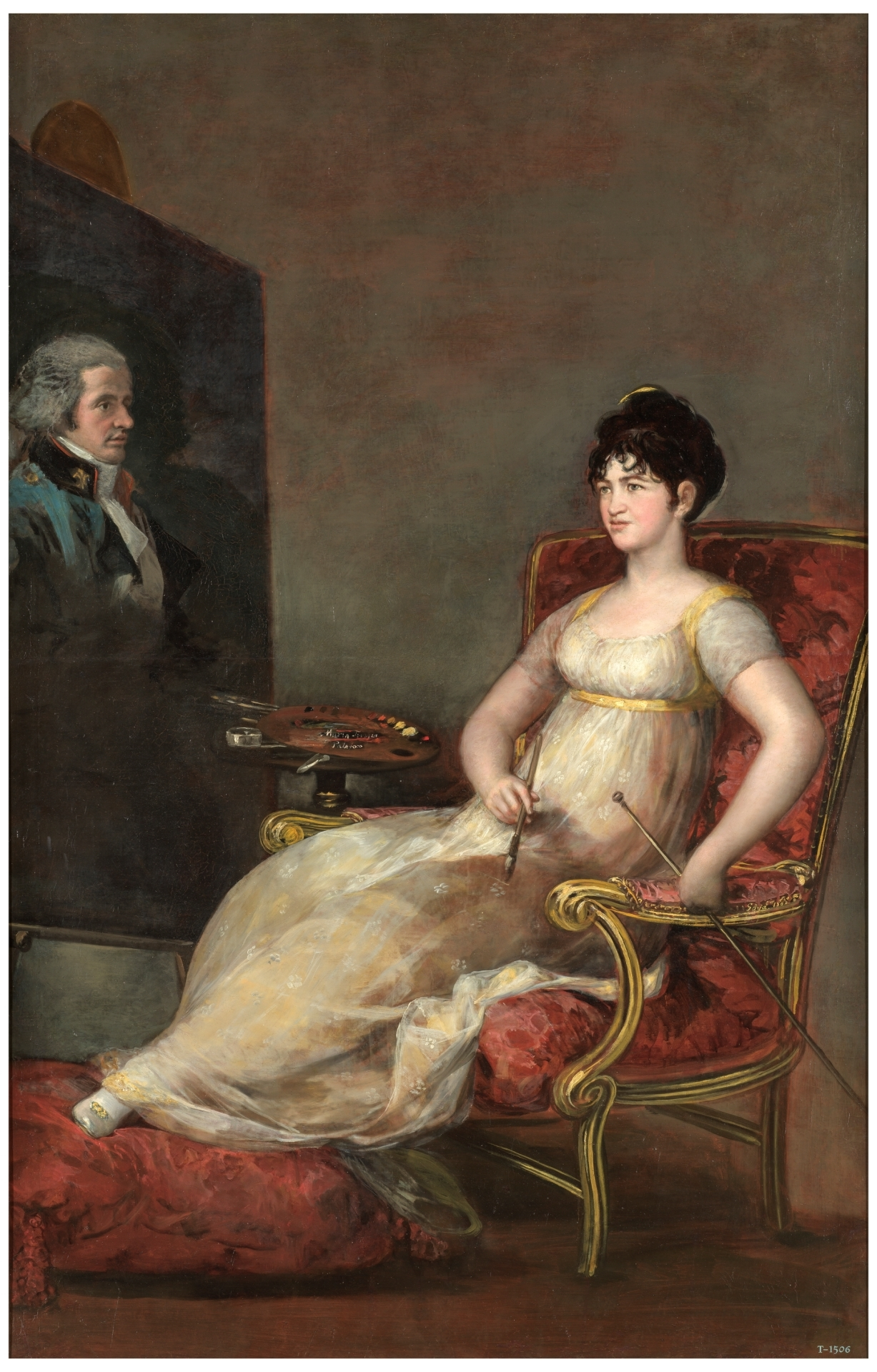
His wife, the Marchioness of Villafranca, painted by Francisco Goya, 1804

On 28 January 1798 in Madrid, he was married to María Tomasa Palafox y Portocarrero (1780–1835), the daughter of Felipe Antonio de Palafox Croy and Maria Francisca de Sales de Guzmán, Countess of Montijo, Grandee of Spain. Together, they had six children, two girls and four boys, including:

- Francisco Álvarez de Toledo y Palafox (1799–1816), who became the 10th Duke of Fernandina before he died aged 16.
- María Teresa Alvarez de Toledo y Palafox (1801–1866), who married Joaquín Florencio Cavero de Ahones y Tarazona, 6th Count of Sobradiel, son of Joaquín Matías Cavero de Ahones y Fernández de Heredia, 5th Count of Sobradiel and Bernarda de Tarazona.
- Pedro de Alcántara Álvarez de Toledo y Palafox (1803–1867), who married María Joaquina del Pilar Silva y Téllez Girón, a daughter of José Gabriel de Silva-Bazán, 10th Marquis of Santa Cruz and Joaquina Téllez-Girón, 2nd Countess of Osilo, in 1822.
- Maria del Rosario Tomasa Álvarez de Toledo y Palafox (1805–1870), who married Pedro Caro y Salas, 4th Marquis of La Romana, son of General Pedro Caro Sureda, 3rd Marquis of La Romana and Dionisia de Salas y Boixadors, in 1826.
- José María Alvarez de Toledo y Palafox (1812–1885), a twin; he married María del Carmen Lucía de Acuña y Dewitte, 9th Marchioness of Casa Fuerte, a daughter of Manuel Lorenzo de Acuña, 9th Marquess of Gramedo, 10th Marquess of Bedmar, and María Antónia Antonia de Witte (a daughter of Carlos José de Witte y Pau), in 1837.
- Ignacio Álvarez de Toledo Palafox (1812–1878), a twin; Maestrante of Sevilla.

Álvarez died on 12 February 1821, predeceased by his eldest son, and was, therefore, succeeded by his second son, Pedro. His widow died at Portici, Italy, on 14 October 1835.

== Ancestry ==
Ancestors of Francisco de Borja Álvarez de Toledo, 12th Marquis of Villafranca

16. Fadrique de Toledo Osorio, 7th Marquis of Villafranca
8. José Fadrique de Toledo Osorio, 8th Marquis of Villafranca
17. María Manuela Fernández de Córdoba y Pimentel
4. Fadrique Vicente de Toledo Osorio, 9th Marquis of Villafranca
18. Fernando Moncada de Aragón, 8th Duke of Montalto
9. Catalina Moncada de Aragón, 9th Duchess of Montalto
19. María Teresa Fajardo, 6th Marquise of los Vélez
2. Antonio Álvarez de Toledo, 10th Marquis of Villafranca
20. Juan Claros Pérez de Guzmán, 11th Duke of Medina Sidonia
10. Manuel Pérez de Guzmán, 12th Duke of Medina Sidonia
21. María Teresa Pimentel y Benavides
5. Juana Pérez de Guzmán y Silva
22. Gregorio de Silva, 9th Duke of the Infantado
11. Luisa María de Silva y Haro
23. María de Haro y Fernández de Córdoba
1. Francisco de Borja Álvarez de Toledo, 12th Marquis of Villafranca
24. Carlo Gonzaga, 2nd Prince of Castiglione
12. Ferdinando Gonzaga, 3rd Prince of Castiglione
25. Isabella Lelio Martinengo
6. Francesco Gonzaga, 1st Duke of Solferino
26. Alexander II Pico, Duke of Mirandola
13. Princess Laura Picco della Mirandola
27. Princess Anna Beatrice d'Este of Modena
3. Princess Maria Antonia Gonzaga
28. Marino Caracciolo, 4th Prince of Santo Buono
14. Carmine Caracciolo, 5th Prince of Santo Buono
29. Giovanna Caracciolo di Torella
7. Giulia Caracciolo di Santo Buono
30. Francesco Ruffo, 4th Duke of Bagnara
15. Giovanna Ruffo di Bagnara
31. Giovanna Lanza

Spanish nobility
Preceded by José Álvarez de Toledo	Marquis of Villafranca; 1796–1821	Succeeded by Pedro de Alcántara Álvarez de Toledo
Preceded by José Álvarez de Toledo	Duke of Fernandina; 1796–1821	Succeeded by Pedro de Alcántara Álvarez de Toledo
Preceded by José Álvarez de Toledo	Duke of Medina Sidonia; 1796–1821	Succeeded by Pedro de Alcántara Álvarez de Toledo
