= Juan Francisco Serrano Martínez =

Spanish politician (born 1988)

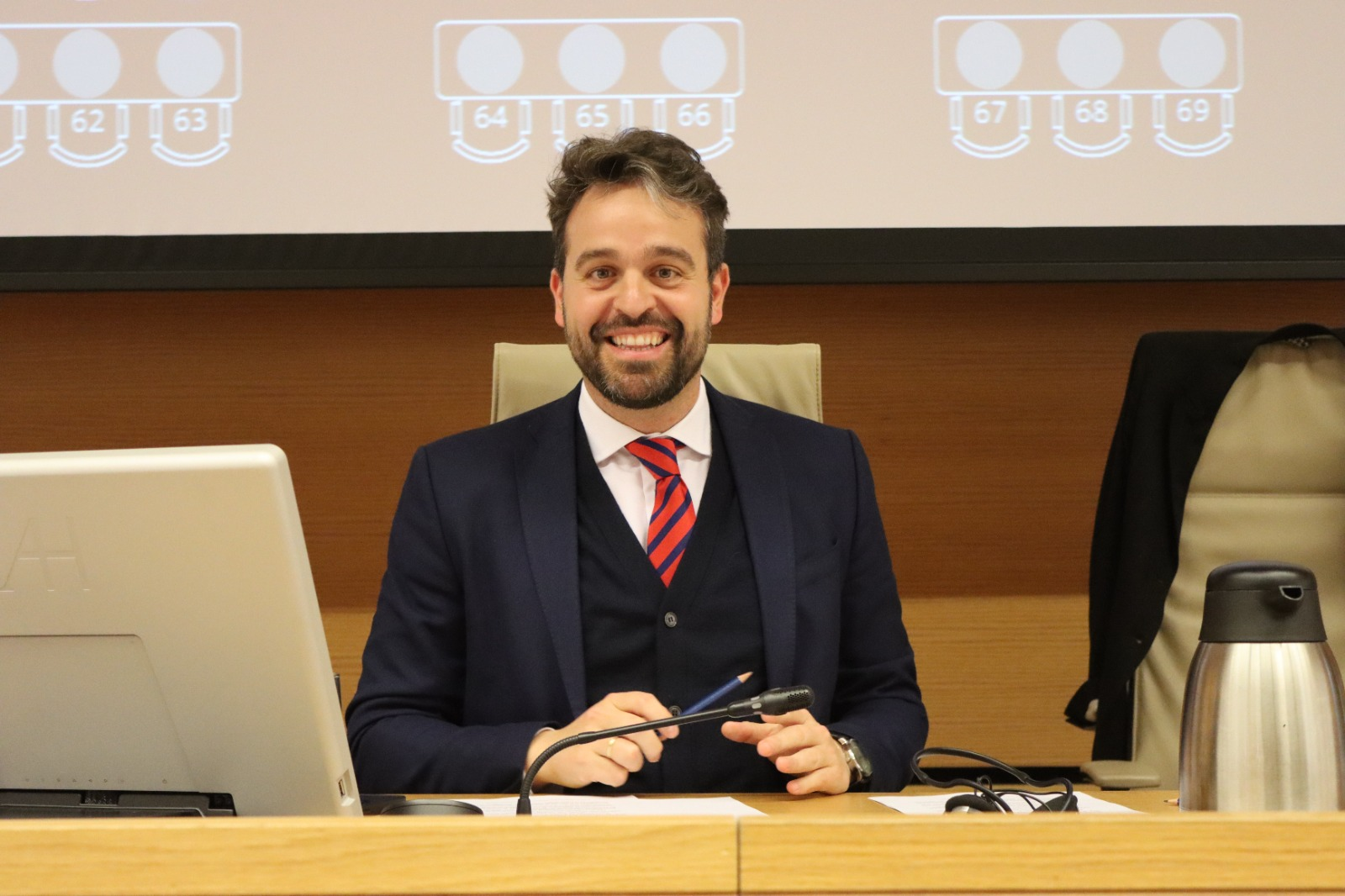

Mayor of Bedmar y Garcíez
- In office 13 June 2015 – 7 March 2020
- Preceded by: Micaela Valdivia García
- Succeeded by: Pablo Ruiz Amezcua

Member of the Congress of Deputies
- In office 21 May 2019 – 3 December 2019
- Constituency: Jaén

Member of the Congress of Deputies
- In office 3 December 2019 – 17 August 2023
- Constituency: Jaén

Member of the Congress of Deputies
- Incumbent
- Assumed office 17 August 2023
- Constituency: Jaén

Personal details
- Born: 19 March 1988 (age 38) Bedmar, Jaén, Spain
- Party: Spanish Socialist Workers' Party (PSOE)
- Spouse: Adriana Maldonado López
- Education: University of Jaén; ESADE

Juan Francisco Serrano Martínez (born 19 March 1988), commonly known as Juanfran Serrano, is a Spanish politician of the Spanish Socialist Workers' Party (PSOE). He has been a member of the Congress of Deputies representing the Province of Jaén since 2019. He previously served as mayor of Bedmar y Garcíez from 2015 to 2020.

== Early life and education ==
Serrano Martínez was born in Bedmar, a municipality in the Province of Jaén, Andalusia. He holds a degree in Technical Industrial Engineering, specialising in mechanics, from the University of Jaén, and an Executive Master's in Operations and Innovation from ESADE.

== Political career ==
=== Mayor of Bedmar y Garcíez (2015–2020) ===
Serrano Martínez was elected mayor of Bedmar y Garcíez in the 2015 Spanish local elections, winning an absolute majority. He was re-elected in the 2019 Spanish local elections with 80.33% of the vote. In February 2020 he resigned as mayor to focus on his parliamentary duties.

=== Member of the Congress of Deputies (2019–present) ===
He was first elected to the Congress of Deputies for Jaén in the April 2019 Spanish general election. He has been re-elected in the November 2019 and July 2023 general elections, serving in the 13th, 14th and 15th legislatures.

In the 14th Legislature (2019–2023) he served as spokesperson of the Committee on Agriculture, Fisheries and Food, and was rapporteur for the national management legislation of the Common Agricultural Policy. In the 15th Legislature (since 2023) he chairs the Joint Committee for Relations with the Court of Auditors.

=== PSOE party roles ===
Serrano Martínez served as secretary-general of the Young Socialists of Spain in the Province of Jaén from 2012 to 2020.

At the PSOE's 40th Federal Congress in October 2021, he was appointed to the party's Federal Executive Committee as Secretary for the Toledo Pact and Social Inclusion. In September 2022 he was designated Deputy Secretary of Organisation. In July 2025 he was appointed Secretary for Municipal Policy on the Federal Executive Committee.

== Personal life ==
He is married to Adriana Maldonado López, a Spanish politician who served as a Member of the European Parliament (2019–2023) and has been a member of the Congress of Deputies for Navarre since 2023.
