= Free and Equal =

Free and Equal may refer to:

- Free and Equal (album), a 2003 album by John Surman
- Free and Equal (Italy), an Italian parliamentary group
- Free and Equal (Spain), a Spanish civic organization
- Free & Equal Elections Foundation, an American organisation that campaigns for electoral reform
