= Alfonso de la Cueva, 1st Marquess of Bedmar =

Spanish cleric and diplomat

His Eminence Alfonso de la Cueva
- Bishop of Málaga
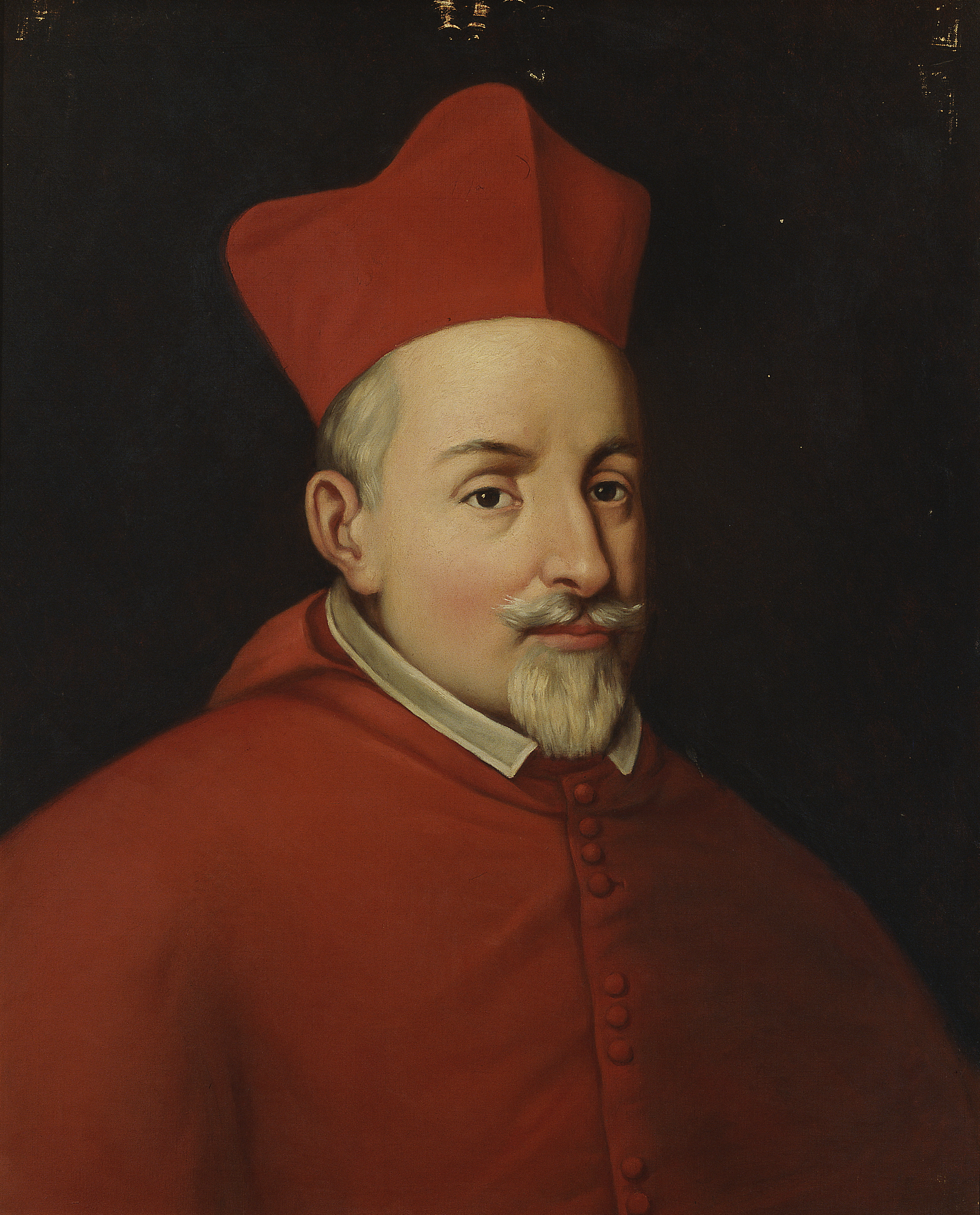
- Cardinal Alfonso de la Cueva, marqués de Bedmar. (Museo del Prado)
- Church: Catholic Church
- Diocese: Málaga
- Appointed: 27 July 1648
- Term ended: 10 August 1655
- Predecessor: Antonio Henriquez Porres
- Successor: Diego Martínez Zarzosa
- Other posts: Cardinal-Bishop of Palestrina (1644-1655)
- Previous posts: Cardinal-Priest of San Martino ai Monti (1633-1635); Cardinal-Priest of Santa Balbina (1635-1644)

Orders
- Consecration: 23 October 1644
- Created cardinal: 5 September 1622 by Pope Gregory XV
- Rank: Cardinal-Bishop

Personal details
- Born: Alfonso de la Cueva-Benavides y Mendoza-Carrillo; 25 July 1574 Bedmar y Garcíez, Jaén, Spain
- Died: 10 August 1655 (aged 81) Málaga, Spain
- Buried: Málaga Cathedral

Alfonso de la Cueva-Benavides y Mendoza-Carrillo, marqués de Bedmar (first name also spelled Alonso, often used was the title Bedmar) (25 July 1574 – 10 August 1655) was a Spanish diplomat, bishop and Roman Catholic cardinal. He was born in Bedmar, in what is now the province of Jaén. Alfonso was the son of Luis de la Cueva-Benavides, 2nd señor of Bedmar, and Elvira Carrillo de Mendoza y Cárdenas.

== Early years ==
Alfonso was born at Bedmar, now Bedmar y Garciez, province of Jaen, Spain. At an early age, he pursued a military career at the side of his father, who was the captain general of the Canary Islands. After 1590, he took his father's place in his absence, and a year later was named captain of the Harquebusiers. After the death of his father in 1599, he became the 3rd lord of his house and became a commander of a Cavalry company.

On 23 December 1606 King Philip III of Spain made him the Spanish ambassador to the Republic of Venice. This was an important position due to the amount of information concerning European affairs which passed through the hands of the Spanish representative. On 16 April 1610 King Philip III awarded him the title of Knight of the Order of Alcántara. In 1614, aged around 42, he was made Marquess of Bedmar (Spanish: Marqués de Bedmar), which he would resign when promoted to the cardinalate.

In 1618 King Philip III charged him with the devolution of the territories conquered by the Spanish forces in Piedmont to the duke of Savoy. In 1616 had Venice concluded an alliance with France, Switzerland, and the Netherlands to counter Spain's power. Bedmar was supposedly the originator of a plot against the Venetian state, a scheme that was to be carried out on Ascension Day in 1618. Whatever the truth of the matter, Bedmar left Venice.

Bedmar went on to Flanders as president of the council. In 1622 he received the red hat of a cardinal. Later, he became the ambassador extraordinary and counselor of Governor of the Habsburg Netherlands, Infanta Isabella Clara Eugenia and the Junta of War in Flanders.

The authorship of an anonymous work, Squitinio della libertà Veneta (Examination of Venetian liberty), published at Mirandola in 1612, has been attributed to him.

== Cardinalate and episcopate ==
Created Cardinal Deacon in the consistory of 5 September 1622 under Pope Gregory XV, (9 January or 15 January 1554 – Pope 6 February 1621 – 8 July 1623), born Alessandro Ludovisi, de la Cueva, then around 51, did not participate in the Consistory of 1623 electing new Pope Urban VIII. He became a Cardinal Priest, receiving the title of San Martino ai Monti on 18 July 1633. De la Cueva opted for the title of Santa Balbina on 9 July 1635 and participated in the papal conclave of 1644.

De la Cueva opted however for the order of bishops and the suburbicarian see of Palestrina, on 17 October 1644. He was consecrated on 23 October 1644. Named bishop of Málaga, retaining the diocese of Palestrina on 27 July 1648, he did not take possession of the diocese until 1651. He did not participate in the papal conclave of 1655.

He died in Málaga and was buried in the Cathedral of Málaga.

== Notes ==
1. sources vary, some indicating 2 August, Oviedo
2. sources vary, some indicate 1607
3. some sources indicate that new research proves there was no conspiracy and Bedmar was framed by Spain political opponents
4. Dictionnaire des cardinaux and some other sources indicate he became bishop of Oviedo but other sources call this an error

Records
Preceded by Marcello Lante della Rovere	Oldest living Member of the Sacred College; 19 April 1652 - 10 April 1655	Succeeded by Vincenzo Maculani
