= Marquess of San Juan de Piedras Albas =

Title in the Peerage of Spain

- Marquis crown
- Creation date: 31 August 1690
- Created by: Charles II of Spain
- First holder: Francisco Silvestre Pizarro Piccolomini de Aragón
- Present holder: José María de Narváez y Muguiro

The Marquess of San Juan de Piedras Albas (Spanish: Marqués de San Juan de Piedras Albas) is a title of Spanish nobility that was created on 31 August 1690 by King Charles II in favor of Francisco Silvestre Pizarro Piccolomini de Aragón.

== History ==
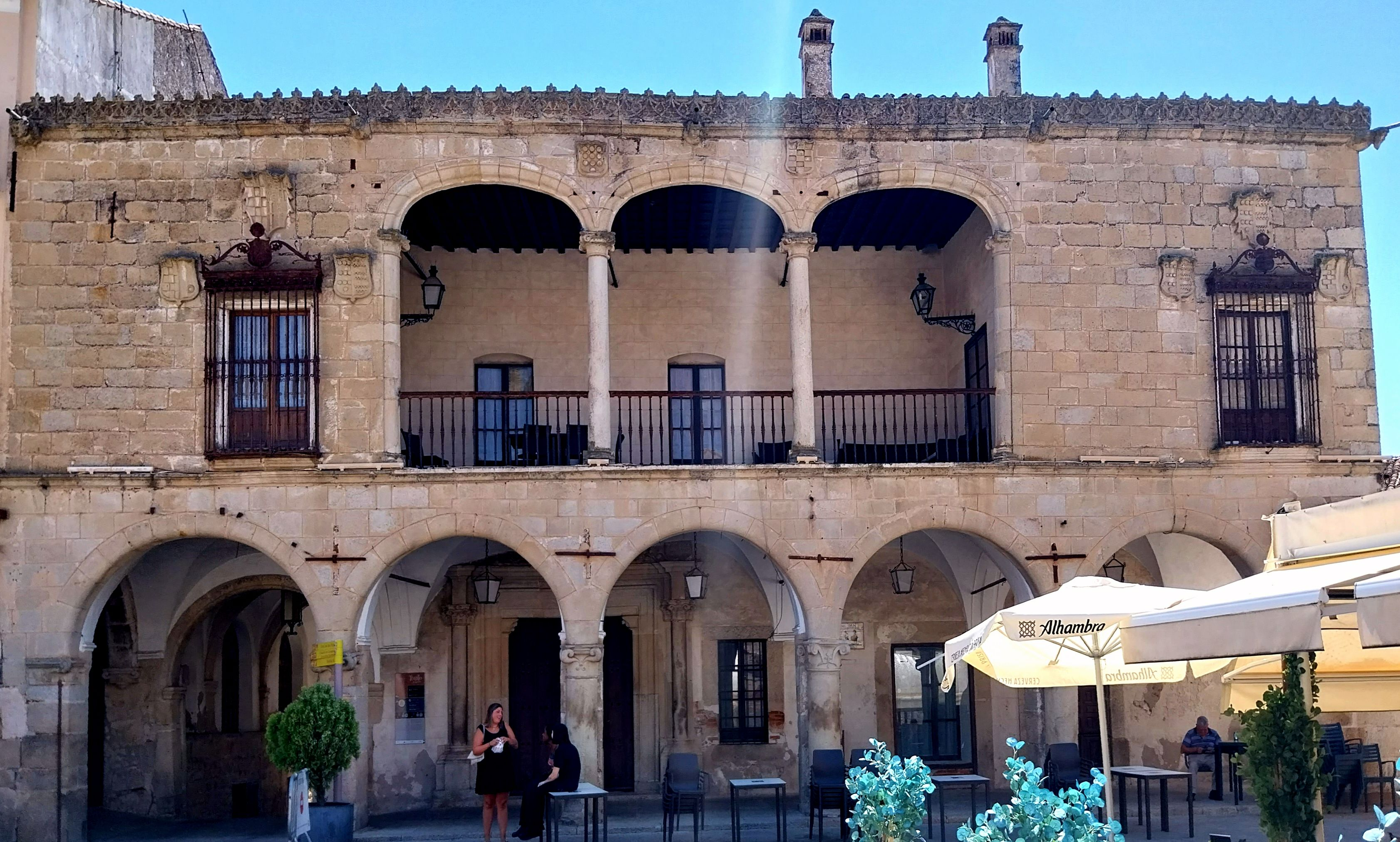
Palacio de Piedras Albas in Trujillo, Cáceres

The Marquessate of San Juan de Piedras Albas was granted by King Charles II on 31 August 1690 along with a royal decree from the same king on 16 August 1691. He was butler and equerry to the Queen. On 15 December 1739, King Philip V granted the title Grandee of Spain status, allowing the marquesses to enjoy greater social privileges than those of other similar European dignities.

The name of the title refers to the municipality of Piedras Albas, in the Province of Cáceres, Extremadura, Spain. They owned the Palacio de Piedras Albas in Trujillo, Cáceres, built in c. 1530, formerly owned by the family of the conquistador and explorer Francisco de Orellana, and the Marqueses de Orellana.

== List of title holders ==
	Holder of Title	Period	Notes
Created by King Charles III of Spain
1	Francisco Pacheco de Córdoba Bocanegra Vázquez de Coronado y Estrada	1690–1736	
2	Juan de la Cruz Pizarro Piccolomini de Aragón	1736–1771	
3	Florencia Pizarro Piccolomini de Aragón y Herrera	1771–1794	
4	Juan de la Cruz Bellvís de Moncada y Pizarro	1794–1835	(Note: Juan de la Cruz Bellvís de Moncada y Pizarro (1756–1835), also 9th Marquess of Villamayor de las Ibernias, married María de la Encarnación Álvarez de Toledo, sister of Francisco de Borja Álvarez de Toledo, 12th Marquis of Villafranca.)
5	Antonio Ciriaco Bellvís de Moncada y Álvarez de Toledo	1835–1842	
6	María de la Encarnación Bellvís de Moncada Palafox	1842–1874	
7	Bernardino de Melgar y Abreu	1910–1942	
8	María de los Dolores de Melgar y Hernández	1952–1977	
9	María del Campanar de Melgar y Hernández	1981–1992	
10	José Luis de Narváez y Melgar	1992–1994	
11	José María de Narváez y Muguiro	1997–	
