= Cave of Bedmar =

Cave and archaeological site in Spain

The Cueva de Bedmar is an archaeological site ranging from the Middle Paleolithic to the Neolithic period placed at Mágina mountain range natural park, nearby the town of Bedmar, in the province of Jaén in Spain.

== Archaeological activity ==
Archaeological activities started after a member of Fundación Instituto de Investigación y Evolución Humana (FIPEH) found archaeological remains suggesting the presence of a potential archaeological site in the area.

In 2015, FIPEH carries out the first archaeological campaign resulting in the finding of more than 600 pieces of archaeological material, mainly lithic tools, belonging to Mousterian culture. These pieces place the Cueva de Bedmar in the Middle Paleolithic. The numerous lithic remain leads to hypothesis that this site was exclusively dedicated to flint knapping.

During the summer of 2016, a new excavating area within the complex of Cueva de Bedmar, named as ‘Cueva del Portillo’, is opened. The work done during this campaign allowed to increase the number of archaeological pieces up to about 2500. There are two findings that stand out from all these pieces: two shell made necklaces, one of them complete.

The hitherto amount of evidences collected, although currently under study, allows researchers to establish four different levels: the upper most level corresponds to the Neolithic period, where there is presence of ground stones and pottery. The second level belongs to the Upper Paleolithic whose relative datation is 13000 years. In this level, there are lithic tools, and this is the level where the completed necklace was found. The third level relates to Magdalenian culture and it is where the second necklace appeared. Here, there are evidences of occupation and several remains of hearths. The last level exhibit lithic tools and fauna bone remains.

== See also ==
- Bedmar
- Province of Jaén (Spain)
- Paleolithic
- Neolithic
