= Villar de Acero =

- Minor local entity
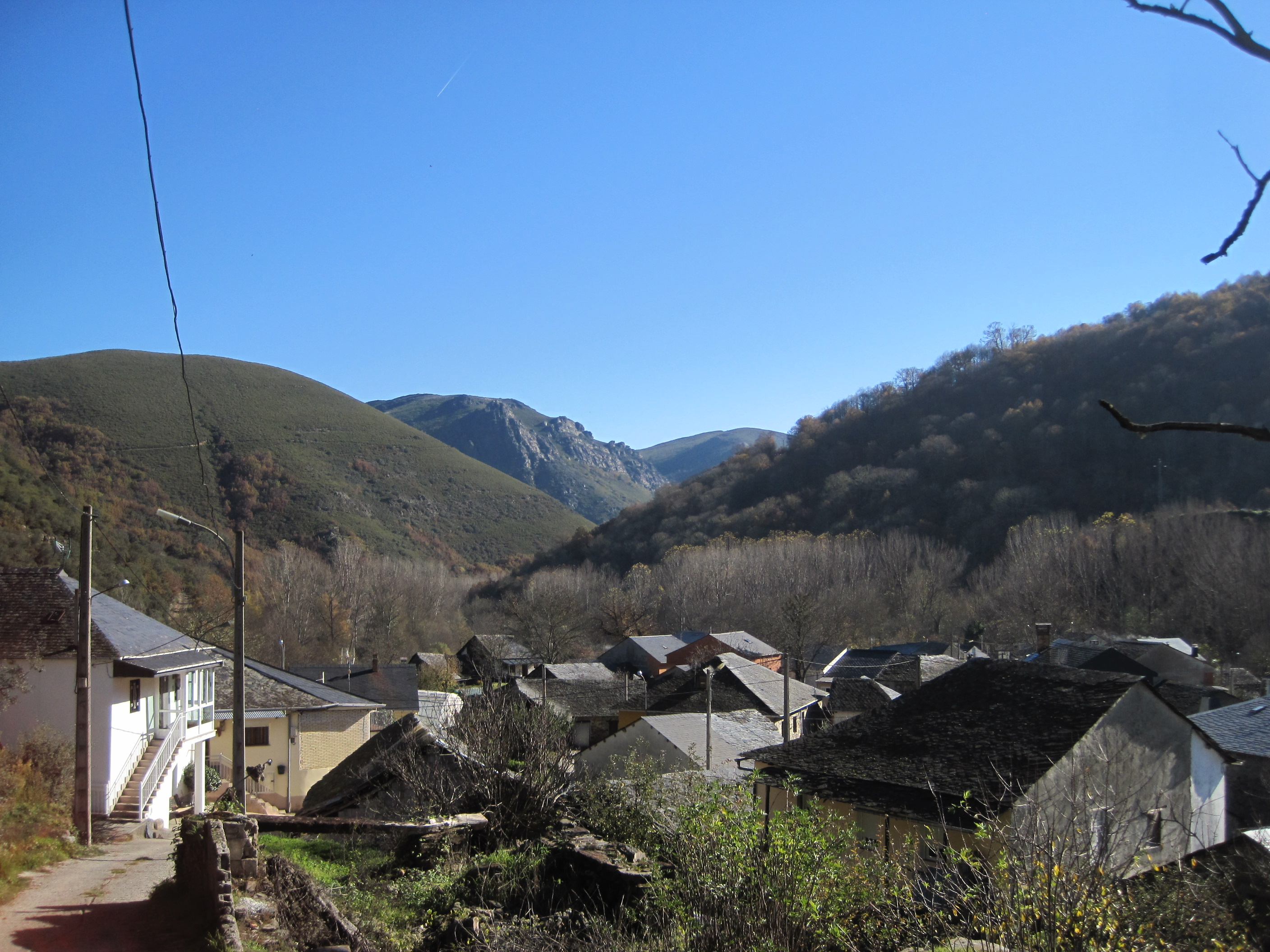

- Location within Province of León Location within Castile and León Location within Spain
- Coordinates: 42°43′26″N 6°48′11″W
- Country: Spain
- Autonomous community: Castile and León
- Province: Province of León
- Municipality: Villafranca del Bierzo
- Elevation: 717 m (2,352 ft)

Population
  - Total: 36

Villar de Acero is a locality and minor local entity located in the municipality of Villafranca del Bierzo, in León province, Castile and León, Spain. As of 2020, it has a population of 36.

== Geography ==
Villar de Acero is located 152km west of León, Spain.
