= José Álvarez de Toledo, Duke of Alba =

Duke of Medina Sidonia, Patron of the arts

José Álvarez de Toledo
- Duke of Alba, Marquess of Villafranca (etc...)
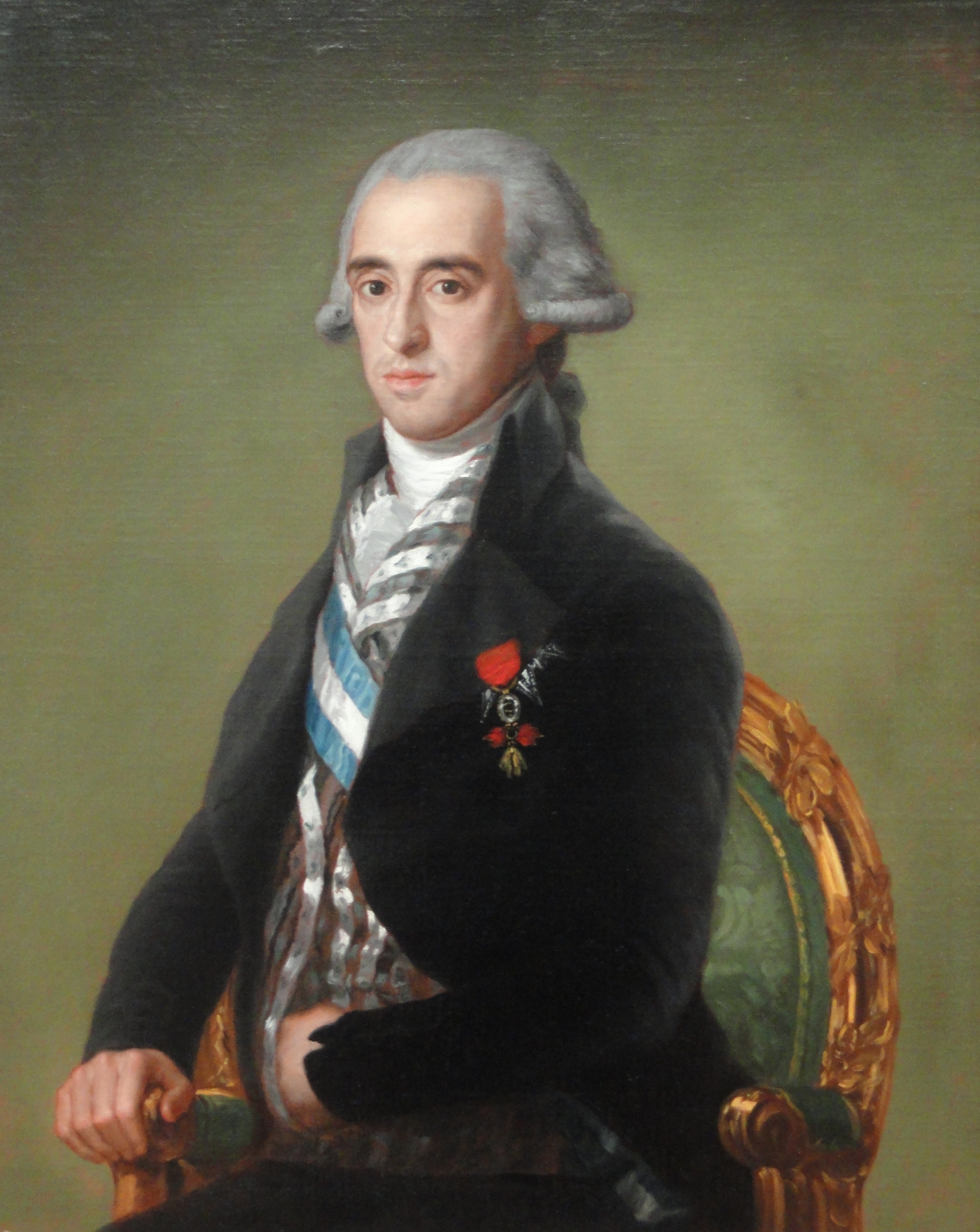
- The Duke of Alba by Francisco de Goya, 1795
- Full name: José María del Carmen Francisco Manuel Joaquín Pedro Juan Andrés Avelino Cayetano Venancio Francisco de Paula Gonzaga Javier Ramón Blas Tadeo Vicente Sebastián Rafael Melchior Gaspar Baltasar Luis Pedro de Alcántara Buenaventura Diego Andrés Apostol Isidro
- Born: 16 July 1756; Madrid, Spain
- Died: 9 June 1796 (aged 39); Seville, Andalusia, Spain
- Noble family: House of Toledo
- Spouse: María del Pilar Teresa Cayetana de Silva Alvarez de Toledo, 13th Duchess of Alba (m. 1775; died 1796)
- Issue: María de la Luz (Adopted)

Don José Álvarez de Toledo Osorio y Gonzaga, 11th Marquess of Villafranca, Grandee of Spain, jure uxoris Duke of Alba de Tormes, Grandee of Spain (16 July 1756 – 9 June 1796) was a patron of the artist Francisco Goya.

== Early life ==
Álvarez de Toledo was born on 16 July 1756 in Madrid. He was the eldest son of Antonio Álvarez de Toledo, 10th Marquis of Villafranca del Bierzo and Princess Maria Antonia Gonzaga.

His paternal grandparents were Fadrique Vicente de Toledo Osorio, 9th Marquis of Villafranca and Juana Pérez de Guzmán y Silva (a daughter of Manuel Pérez de Guzmán, 12th Duke of Medina Sidonia). His maternal grandparents were Francesco Gonzaga, 1st Duke of Solferino (a son of Ferdinando Gonzaga, 3rd Prince of Castiglione) and Giulia Caracciolo di Santo Buono (a daughter of Carmine Caracciolo, 5th Prince of Santo Buono).

At thirteen, he became chamberlain to King Charles IV of Spain.

== Career ==
A year after his marriage, he inherited the dukedom of Medina-Sidonia (by the 21st century the oldest extant dukedom in the kingdom) and joined two of the most important Houses of the Spanish nobility.

The failed attempt of his friend Alejandro Malaspina to oust Queen María Luisa's favourite Manuel de Godoy in favour of the Duke of Alba put an early end to the political career of the progressive aristocrat.

== Personal life ==
In 1775, as the 11th Marquess of Villafranca, he married his kinswoman Doña María del Pilar Teresa Cayetana de Silva y Álvarez de Toledo. Their marriage made them the wealthiest couple in the kingdom; they competed against the Osuna family. The year after their marriage, she became the 13th Duchess of Alba after inheriting the title from her paternal grandfather, Fernando de Silva, 12th Duke of Alba, thereby José Álvarez became de jure uxoris Duke of Alba. María Teresa, as she was known in her family, was the legendary "Duchess of Alba" in Goya's paintings.

Álvarez de Toledo y Gonzaga died on 9 June 1796, in Seville. As the couple had no children, Álvarez de Toledo y Gonzaga was succeeded by his brother Francisco de Borja. His wife held the title of Duchess of Alba until her death in 1802 and she was succeeded by a relative Carlos Miguel Fitz-James Stuart.

=== Art patronage ===
In a famous portrait by Goya, the duke is clad in elegant riding clothes. With an air of melancholy he looks up from the music book he is holding in his hands, including the "Four songs/with piano accompaniment/by Mr. Haydn". The duke commissioned several works from Joseph Haydn and was a gifted musician himself. In his painting, Goya subtly combines the symbols of his model's passion for music and equestrian skills (viola or violin, riding boots and riding hat) with the neoclassical interior of the ducal residence.

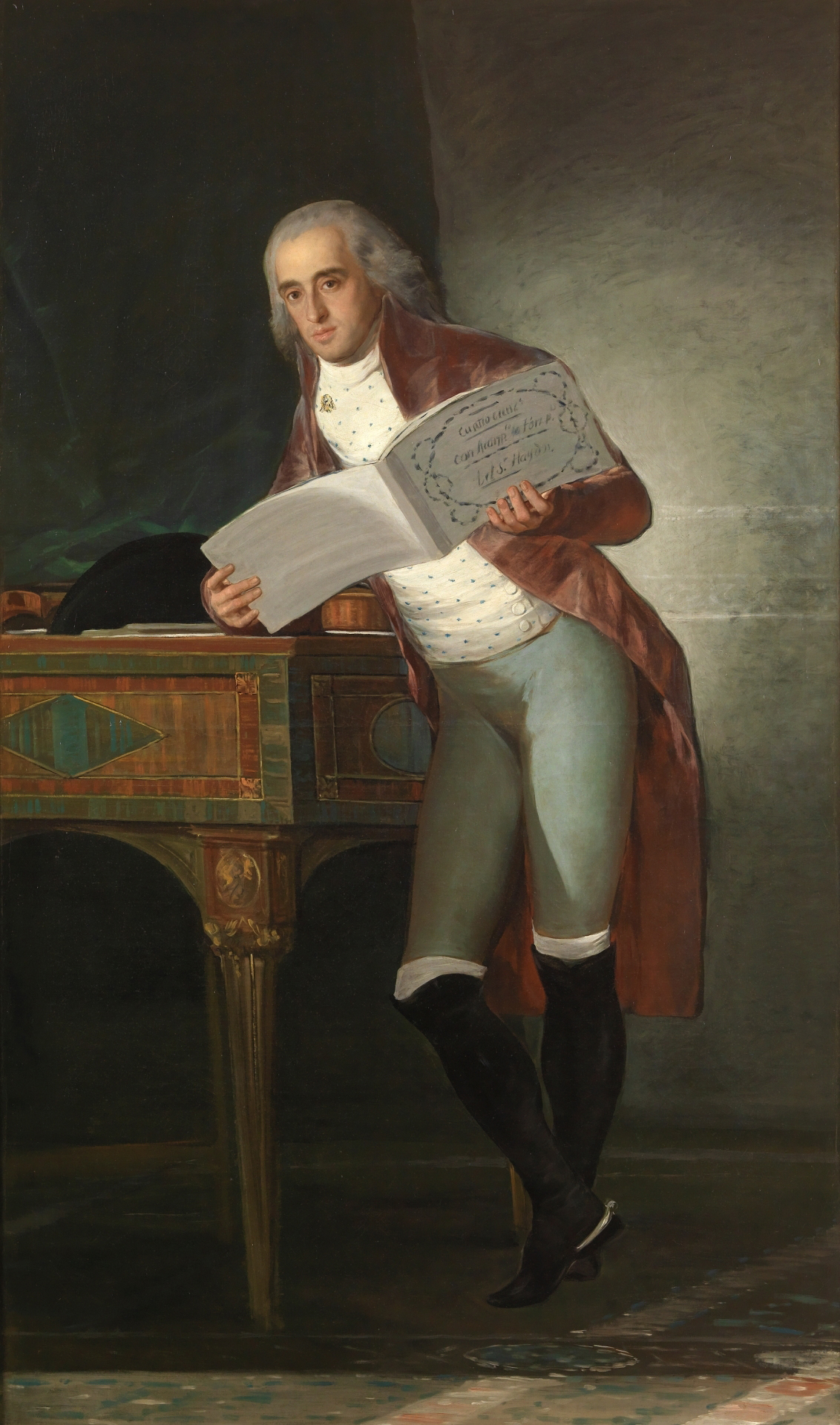
José Álvarez de Toledo around 1795 by Goya

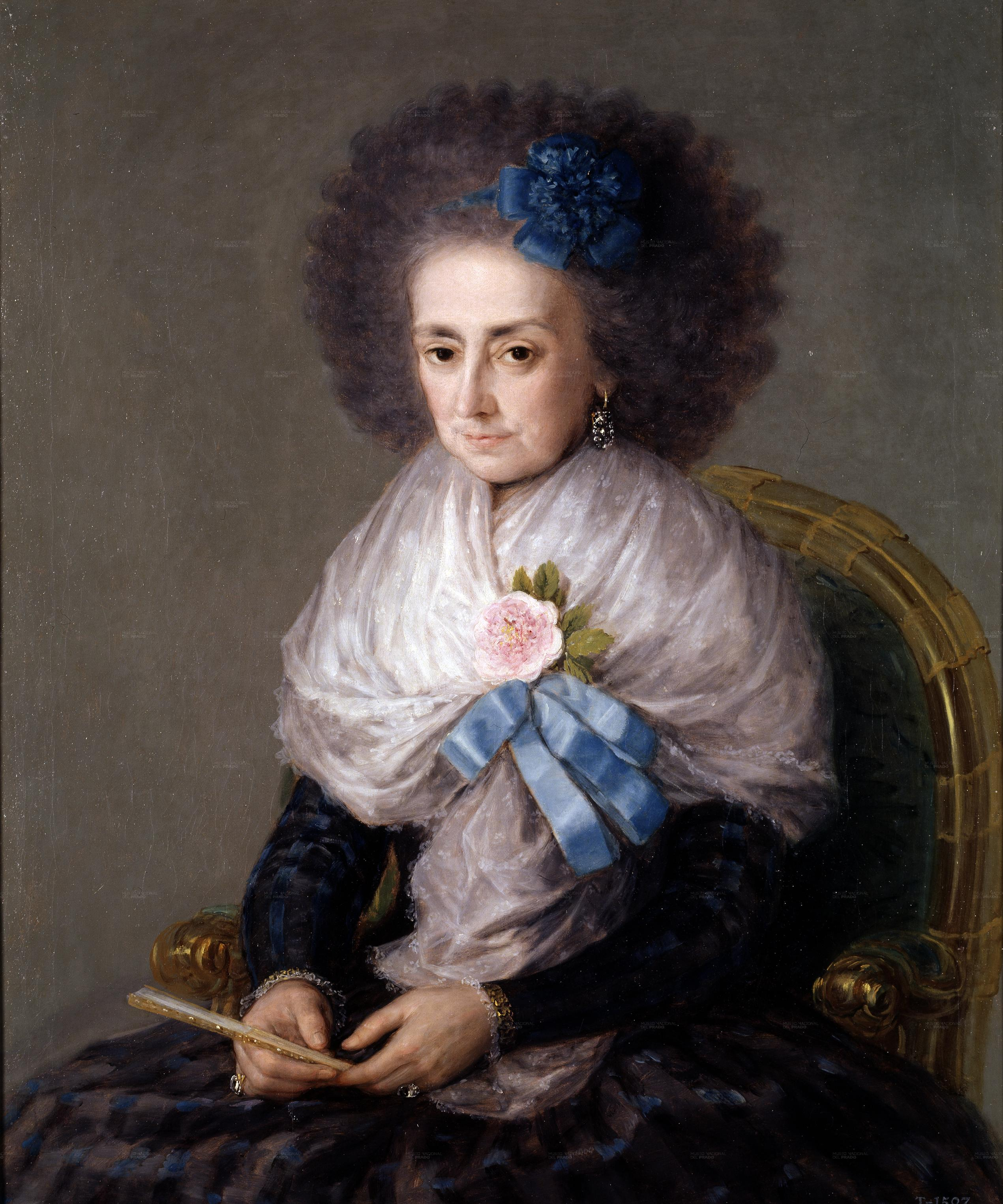
María Antonia Gonzaga, his mother.

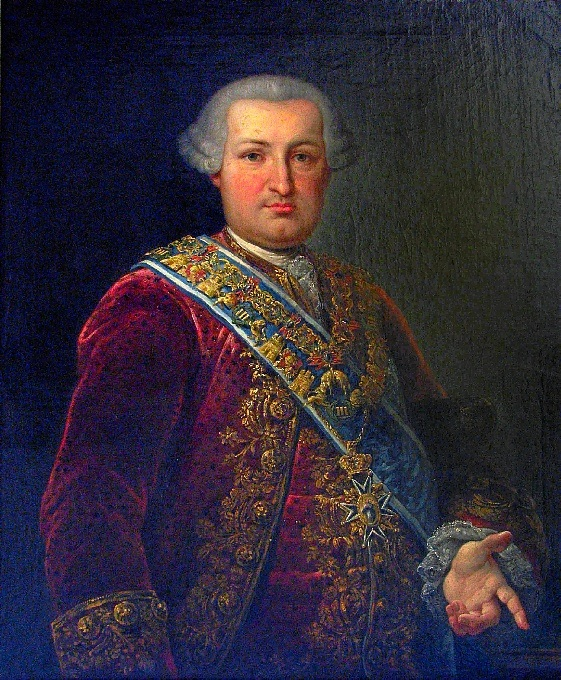
The 14th Duke of Medina Sidonia, his cousin and predecessor.

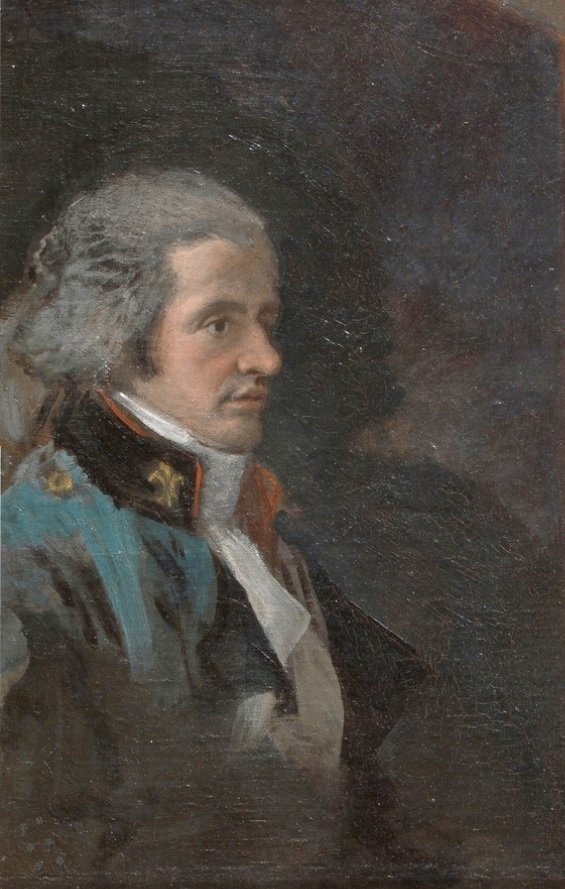
The 12th Marquess of Villafranca, his brother and successor.

== Ancestry ==
Ancestors of José Álvarez de Toledo, Duke of Alba

8. José Fadrique de Toledo Osorio, 8th Marquess of Villafranca
4. Fadrique Vicente de Toledo Osorio, 9th Marquess of Villafranca
9. Catalina Moncada de Aragón, 9th Duchess of Montalto
2. Antonio Álvarez de Toledo, 10th Marquess of Villafranca
10. Manuel Pérez de Guzmán, 12th Duke of Medina Sidonia
5. Juana Pérez de Guzmán y Silva
11. Luisa María de Silva y Haro
1. José María Álvarez de Toledo, 15th Duke of Medina Sidonia
12. Ferdinando Gonzaga, 3rd Prince of Castiglione
6. Francesco Gonzaga, 1st Duke of Solferino
13. Princess Laura Picco della Mirandola
3. Princess Maria Antonia Gonzaga
14. Carmine Caracciolo, 5th Prince of Santo Buono
7. Giulia Caracciolo di Santo Buono
15. Giovanna Ruffo di Bagnara

Spanish nobility
Preceded by Antonio Álvarez de Toledo	Duke of Fernandina; 1756–1796	Succeeded by Francisco de Borja Álvarez de Toledo
Preceded by Antonio Álvarez de Toledo	Marquess of Villafranca; 1773–1796	Succeeded by Francisco de Borja Álvarez de Toledo
Preceded by Pedro de Alcántara Alonso Pérez de Guzmán	Duke of Medina Sidonia; 1779–1796	Succeeded by Francisco de Borja Álvarez de Toledo
Vacant Title last held by María Teresa de Haro as Duchess of Alba	Duke consort of Alba; 1776–1796	Vacant Title next held by Rosalia Ventimiglia as Duchess of Alba
