= Vilela (Villafranca del Bierzo) =

- Minor local entity
- Location within Province of León Location within Castile and León Location within Spain
- Coordinates: 42°35′19″N 6°48′9″W
- Country: Spain
- Autonomous community: Castile and León
- Province: Province of León
- Municipality: Villafranca del Bierzo
- Elevation: 474 m (1,555 ft)

Population
  - Total: 238

Vilela is a locality and minor local entity located in the municipality of Villafranca del Bierzo, in León province, Castile and León, Spain. As of 2020, it has a population of 238.

== Geography ==
Vilela is located 133km west of León, Spain.
