= Marquess of Bedmar =

Title in the Peerage of Spain

- Marquis crown
- Creation date: 15 June 1614
- Created by: Philip III of Spain
- First holder: Alonso II de la Cueva y Benavides
- Present holder: Julio de Heredia y Halcón

The Marquess of Bedmar (Spanish: Marqués de Bedmar) is a title of Spanish nobility that was created on 15 June 1614 by King Philip III in favor of the Lord of Bedmar (and future Cardinal) Alonso II de la Cueva y Benavides during his stay as Ambassador of Spain in the Republic of Venice.

== History ==
The title refers to the Andalusian municipality of Bedmar, in the Province of Jaén. This town was acquired in 1562 by Alonso I de la Cueva y Benavides, who participated in the Battle of Villalar and captured the famous Juan de Padilla and later was governor and captain general of La Goleta (Tunisia) and last commander of Bedmar and Albanchez, when Pope Paul III and Charles I of Spain detached this town from the Order of Calatrava, becoming part of the family heritage.

== List of title holders ==
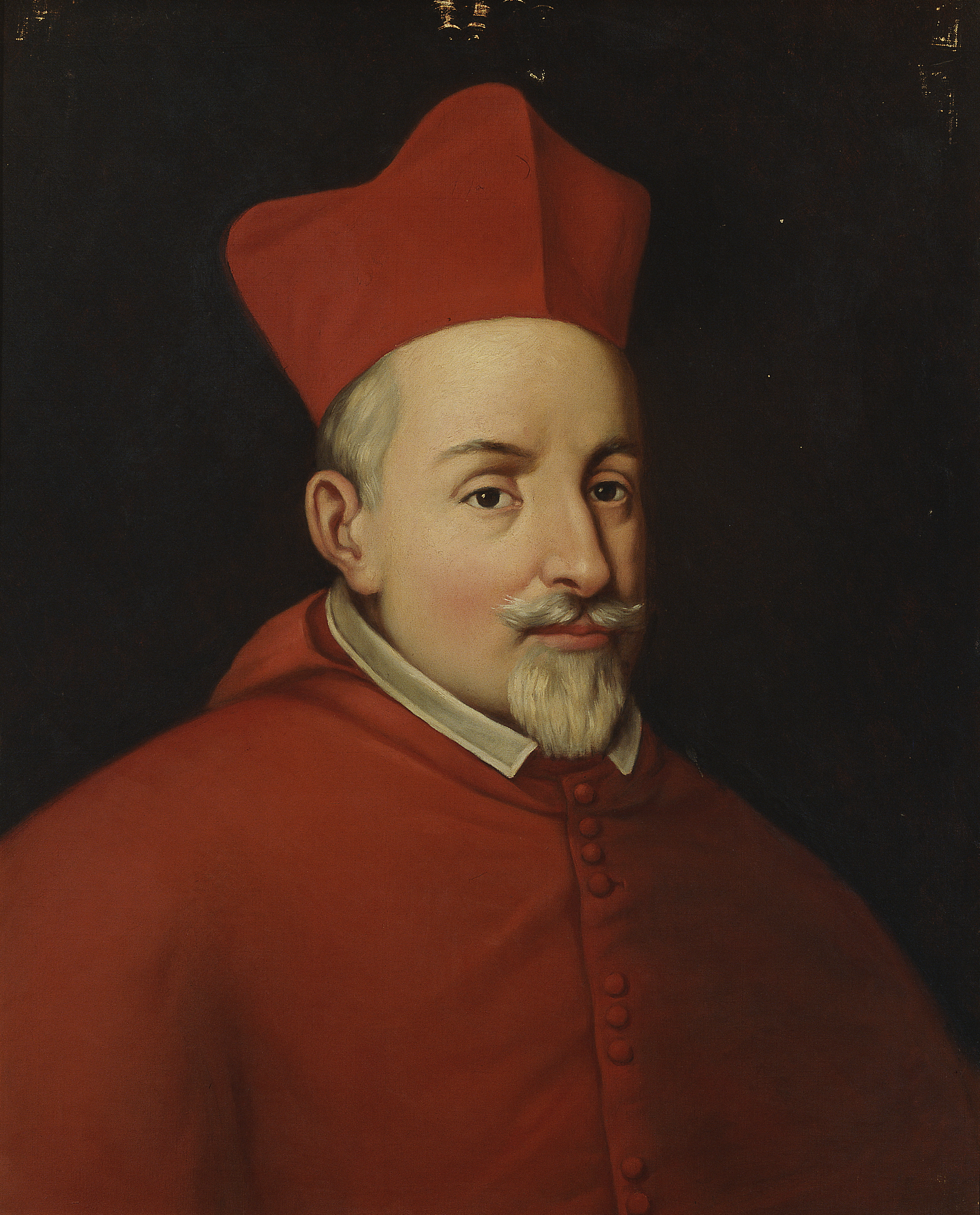
Portrait of the 1st Marquess, Cardinal Alfonso de la Cueva, the Bishop of Málaga, by Manuel Ojeda y Siles, c. 1877.

	Holder of Title	Period	Notes
Created by King Philip III of Spain
1	Alonso de la Cueva y Benavides	1614–1622	
2	Juan de la Cueva y Benavides	1622–1626	
3	Gaspar Bernardino de la Cueva y Mendoza	1626–1664	
4	Melchor de la Cueva y Enríquez	1664–1667	
5	Isidro de la Cueva y Enríquez	1667–1723	(Note: Isidoro de la Cueva y Benavides (1652–1723) was the youngest son of Gaspar Bernardino de la Cueva y Mendoza, 3rd Marquess of Bedmar (1594–1664) and succeeded his elder brother, Melchor de la Cueva y Enríquez (1646–1667). He married his niece, María Manuela de Acuña (1666–1706), the daughter of his sister Francisca (a Lady-in-waiting to Queen Mariana) and Pedro de Acuña y Meneses, Marqués de Assentar. The 5th Marquess was succeeded by his daughter, Maria.)
6	María Francisca de la Cueva y Acuña	1723–1754	(Note: María Francisca de la Cueva y Acuña (1699–1754), who succeeded her father, married Marciano Fernández Pacheco, 12th Marquess of Moya.)
7	Felipe López-Pacheco de la Cueva	1754–1798	(Note: Felipe López-Pacheco de la Cueva, 7th Marquis of Bedmar (1727–1798), Grandee of Spain, was also the 12th Duke of Escalona, 13th Marquess of Moya, 5th Marquess of Assentar, 5th Count of Villanova, 12th Marquess of Villena, Count of Xiquena, Count of San Esteban de Gormaz, 16th Marquess of Aguilar de Campoó, 9th Count of Castañeda, and 10th Marquess of Eliseda. In 1750, he married María Luisa Centurión y Velasco, 8th Marchioness of Estepa, 14th Countess of Fuensalida, 8th Countess of Colmenar de Oreja, 9th Marchioness of Laula, 9th Marchioness of Vivola, 9th Marchioness of Monte de Vay, 10th Countess of las Posadas, 8th Countess of Casa de Palma, 11th Countess of Barajas, 9th Marchioness of la Alameda, 11th Countess of Puñonrostro, and 3rd Marchioness of Casasola.)
8	María Luisa Centurión y Velasco	1798–1799	(Note: María Luisa Centurión y Velasco (d. 1799), succeeded her husband.)
9	Antonio María de Acuña y Fernández de Miranda	1799–1810	
10	Manuel Lorenzo de Acuña y Fernández de Miranda	1810–1824	
11	Manuel Antonio de Acuña y Dewitte	1824–1883	(Note: Manuel Antonio de Acuña y Dewitte (1821–1883), was also the 8th Marquess of Casa Fuerte and 9th Count of Óbedos. He was succeeded by his nephew, the son of his sister María Cayetana de Acuña y Dewitte (1807-1864), 9th Marchioness of Villanueva de las Torres.)
12	Ernesto de Heredia y Acuña	1883–1926	
13	Manuel de Heredia y Carvajal	1927–1940	
14	Alonso de Heredia y del Rivero	1951–1983	
15	Julio de Heredia y Halcón	1985–	(Note: Julio de Heredia y Halcón (b. 1950), is also the 7th Marquess of Villar de Tajo, 13th Marquess of Casa Fuerte.)
