= Valtuille de Abajo =

Locality in Castile and León, Spain

- Minor local entity
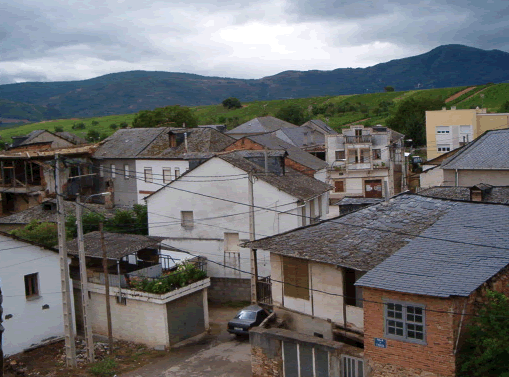

- Location within Province of León Location within Castile and León Location within Spain
- Coordinates: 42°35′40″N 6°45′51″W
- Country: Spain
- Autonomous community: Castile and León
- Province: Province of León
- Municipality: Villafranca del Bierzo
- Elevation: 500 m (1,600 ft)

Population
  - Total: 102

Valtuille de Abajo is a locality and minor local entity located in the municipality of Villafranca del Bierzo, in León province, Castile and León, Spain. As of 2020, it has a population of 102.

== Geography ==
Valtuille de Abajo is located 130km west of León, Spain.
