= Valtuille de Arriba =

- Minor local entity
- Location within Province of León Location within Castile and León Location within Spain
- Coordinates: 42°36′59″N 6°45′50″W
- Country: Spain
- Autonomous community: Castile and León
- Province: Province of León
- Municipality: Villafranca del Bierzo
- Elevation: 560 m (1,840 ft)

Population
  - Total: 85

Valtuille de Arriba is a locality and minor local entity located in the municipality of Villafranca del Bierzo, in León province, Castile and León, Spain. As of 2020, it has a population of 85.

== Geography ==
Valtuille de Arriba is located 128km west of León, Spain.
