= Veguellina =

- Minor local entity
- Location within Province of León Location within Castile and León Location within Spain
- Coordinates: 42°42′16″N 6°46′59″W
- Country: Spain
- Autonomous community: Castile and León
- Province: Province of León
- Municipality: Villafranca del Bierzo
- Elevation: 664 m (2,178 ft)

Population
  - Total: 18

Veguellina is a locality and minor local entity located in the municipality of Villafranca del Bierzo, in León province, Castile and León, Spain. As of 2020, it has a population of 18.

== Geography ==
Veguellina is located 147km west of León, Spain.
