= Laura Ballarin Cereza =

Spanish politician (born 1984)

Laura Ballarin Cereza MEP
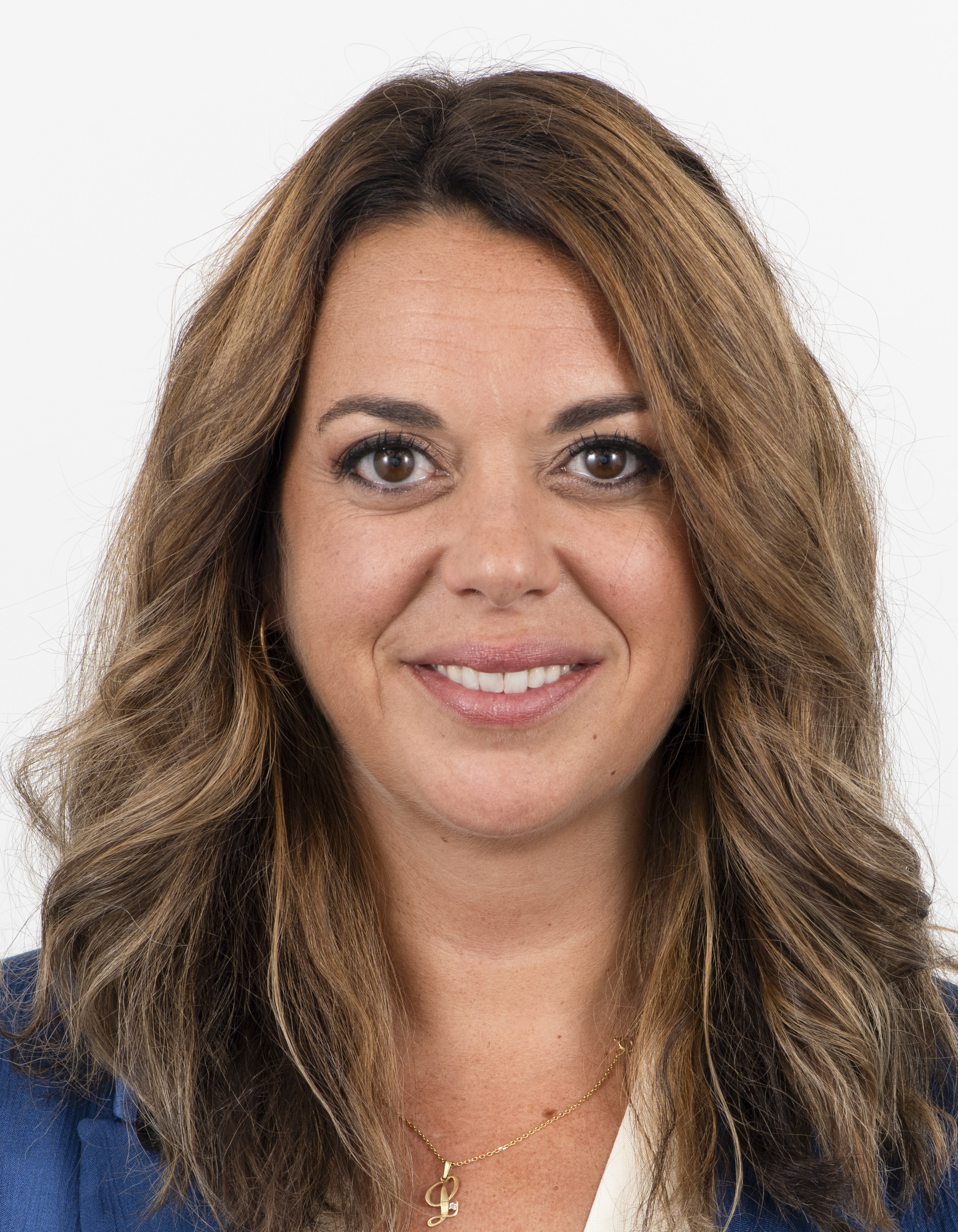

Member of the European Parliament for Spain
- Incumbent
- Assumed office 6 September 2023
- Preceded by: Adriana Maldonado López

Personal details
- Born: 19 July 1984 (age 42) Barcelona
- Party: Spanish Socialist Workers' Party
- Education: Pompeu Fabra University

Laura Ballarín Cereza (born in Barcelona on July 19, 1984) is a Spanish political scientist and politician, a Member of the European Parliament for the Socialists' Party of Catalonia (PSC) since September 2023. She is currently the coordinator for the Progressive Alliance of Socialists and Democrats Group in the Committee on the Internal Market and Consumer Protection (IMCO) and the Secretary of European and International Policy in the PSC's executive committee.

Her professional career has focused on international relations and European policy. In the European Parliament, her work focuses on legislation regarding digital rights, consumer protection, Europe's strategic industrial autonomy, and the European Union's foreign relations, especially with Africa, the Mediterranean, and the United States.

== Biography ==
She was born and raised in the Gràcia neighborhood of Barcelona. She holds a degree in Political and Administration Sciences from Pompeu Fabra University (UPF). She furthered her education with an Official Master's in Contemporary Latin America and its relations with the EU from the Ortega y Gasset University Research Institute, a Master's in Leadership in Political Management from the Autonomous University of Barcelona, and a Postgraduate degree in International Electoral Observation from the University of the Basque Country.

Professionally, she has worked as a researcher at UPF, an advisor in the PSOE's Secretariat for International Policy and Cooperation, and an assistant in the Spanish Socialist Delegation to the European Parliament. Between 2019 and 2023, she was the head of the cabinet for the president of the Socialists and Democrats Group, Iratxe García. In September 2023, she took her seat as a Member of the European Parliament.

== Political Activity ==
=== 9th term of the European Parliament (2023-2024) ===
After becoming an MEP in September 2023, she joined the Progressive Alliance of Socialists and Democrats Group. During this period, she was a full member of the Committee on the Internal Market and Consumer Protection (IMCO) and the Delegation for relations with the Maghreb countries. Additionally, she was a substitute member of the Committee on Industry, Research and Energy (ITRE) and the Committee on Women's Rights and Gender Equality (FEMM).

=== 10th term of the European Parliament (2024-present) ===
In the current term, Ballarín is the coordinator for her political group in the Committee on the Internal Market and Consumer Protection (IMCO). In this committee, she has been the rapporteur for the review of the Directive on alternative dispute resolution and the shadow rapporteur for the Directive on Green Claims.

She is also a substitute member of the Committee on Industry, Research and Energy (ITRE) and the Committee on Foreign Affairs (AFET), where her work focuses on relations with West Africa and the European microstates.

In the field of foreign relations, she is a member of the Africa-EU Parliamentary Delegation and a substitute in the Delegation for relations with the United States and in the Parliamentary Assembly of the Union for the Mediterranean.

In 2024, she was appointed head of the European Union's Electoral Observation Mission for the general elections in Mozambique, presenting the final report in Maputo in January 2025.

== Other affiliations ==
She is the vice-president of the Consell Català del Moviment Europeu and a member of the association Federalistes d'Esquerres.
