= Tejeira =

- Minor local entity
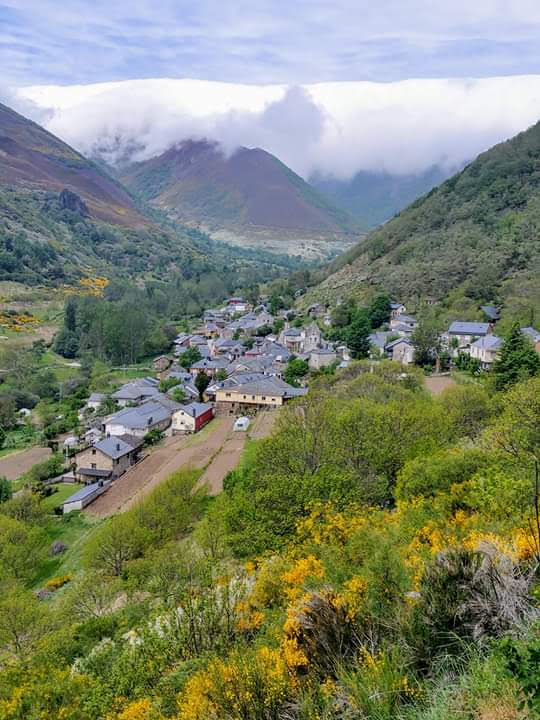

- Location within Province of León Location within Castile and León Location within Spain
- Coordinates: 42°45′31″N 6°51′24″W
- Country: Spain
- Autonomous community: Castile and León
- Province: Province of León
- Municipality: Villafranca del Bierzo
- Elevation: 1,007 m (3,304 ft)

Population
  - Total: 67

Tejeira is a locality and minor local entity located in the municipality of Villafranca del Bierzo, in León province, Castile and León, Spain. As of 2020, it has a population of 67.

== Geography ==
Tejeira is located 159km west of León, Spain.
