= Paradaseca =

- Minor local entity
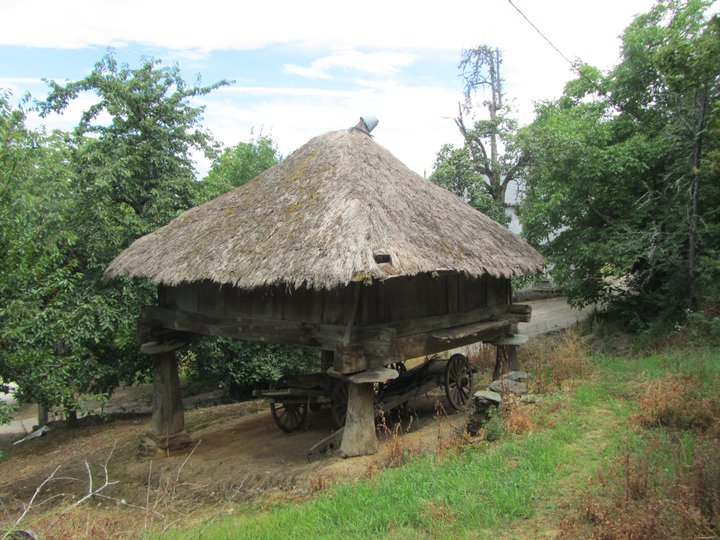

- Location within Province of León Location within Castile and León Location within Spain
- Coordinates: 42°40′53″N 6°48′10″W
- Country: Spain
- Autonomous community: Castile and León
- Province: Province of León
- Municipality: Villafranca del Bierzo
- Elevation: 726 m (2,382 ft)

Population
  - Total: 40

Paradaseca is a locality and minor local entity located in the municipality of Villafranca del Bierzo, in León province, Castile and León, Spain. As of 2020, it has a population of 40.

== Geography ==
Paradaseca is located 145km west of León, Spain.
