= Cela (León) =

- Minor local entity
- Location within Province of León Location within Castile and León Location within Spain
- Coordinates: 42°41′2″N 6°49′42″W
- Country: Spain
- Autonomous community: Castile and León
- Province: Province of León
- Municipality: Villafranca del Bierzo
- Elevation: 858 m (2,815 ft)

Population
  - Total: 22

Cela is a locality and minor local entity located in the municipality of Villafranca del Bierzo, in León province, Castile and León, Spain. As of 2020, it has a population of 22.

== Geography ==
Cela is located 153km west of León, Spain.
