= Puente de Rey =

- Locality
- Location within Province of León Location within Castile and León Location within Spain
- Coordinates: 42°37′44″N 6°47′58″W
- Country: Spain
- Autonomous community: Castile and León
- Province: Province of León
- Municipality: Villafranca del Bierzo
- Elevation: 564 m (1,850 ft)

Population
  - Total: 23

Puente de Rey is a locality located in the municipality of Villafranca del Bierzo, in León province, Castile and León, Spain. As of 2020, it has a population of 23.

== Geography ==
Puente de Rey is located 136km west of León, Spain.
