= Pobladura de Somoza =

- Minor local entity
- Location within Province of León Location within Castile and León Location within Spain
- Coordinates: 42°38′56″N 6°46′38″W
- Country: Spain
- Autonomous community: Castile and León
- Province: Province of León
- Municipality: Villafranca del Bierzo
- Elevation: 943 m (3,094 ft)

Population
  - Total: 26

Pobladura de Somoza is a locality and minor local entity located in the municipality of Villafranca del Bierzo, in León province, Castile and León, Spain. As of 2020, it has a population of 26.

== Geography ==
Pobladura de Somoza is located 132km west of León, Spain.
