= Cayetana Álvarez de Toledo =

Spanish politician (born 1974)

The Most Illustrious Doña Cayetana Álvarez de Toledo 15th Marchioness of Casa Fuerte MP
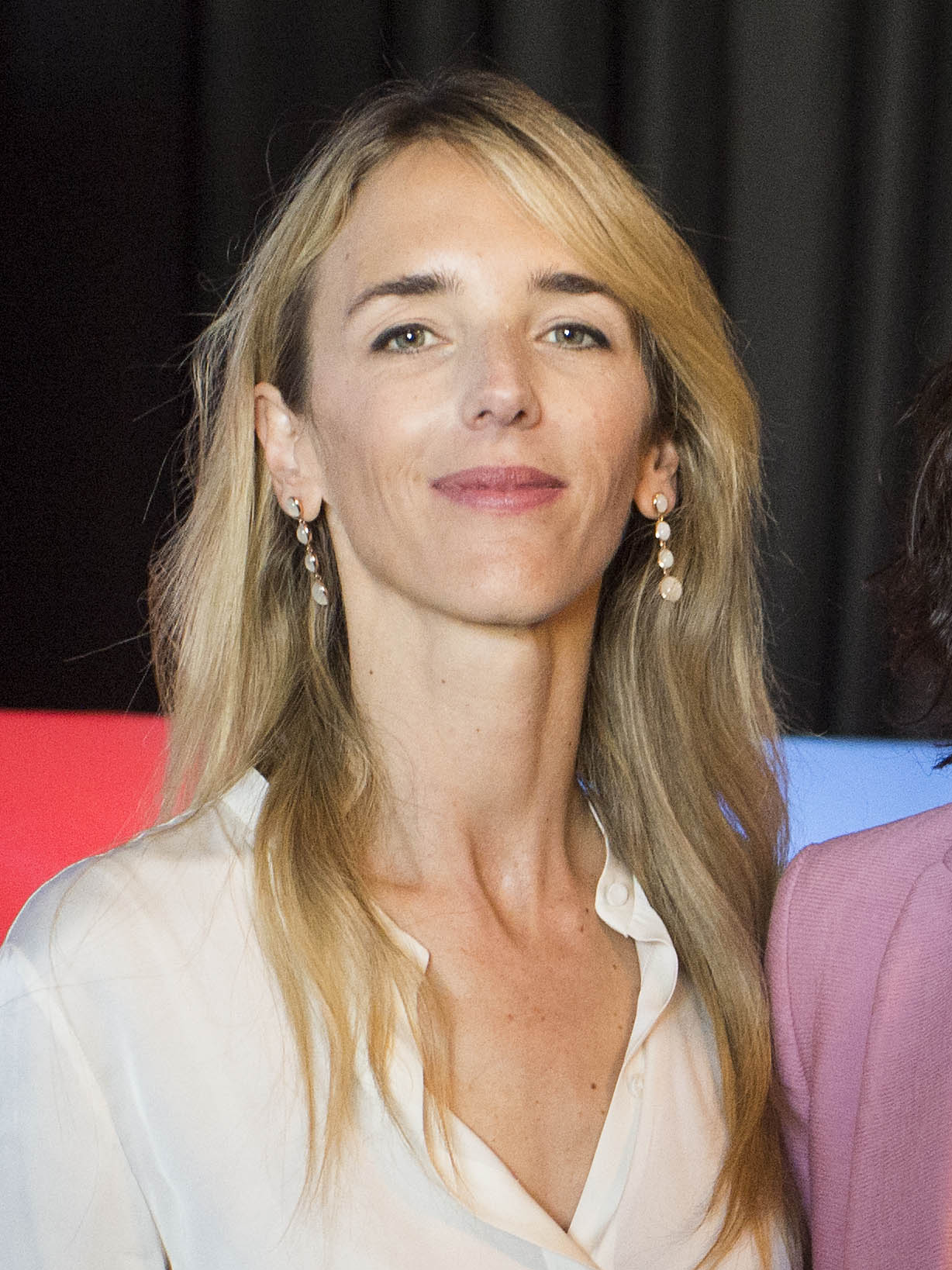
- Álvarez de Toledo in 2019

Spokesperson of the Popular Group in the Congress of Deputies
- In office 30 July 2018 – 21 August 2020
- Preceded by: José Antonio Bermúdez de Castro
- Succeeded by: Cuca Gamarra

Member of the Congress of Deputies
- Incumbent
- Assumed office 21 May 2019
- Constituency: Barcelona (2019–2023); Madrid (since 2023)
- In office 1 April 2008 – 27 October 2015
- Constituency: Madrid

Personal details
- Born: Cayetana Álvarez de Toledo y Peralta-Ramos; 15 October 1974 (age 51) Madrid, Spain
- Citizenship: Argentina; France; Spain
- Party: PP (since 2007)
- Spouse: Joaquín Güell (m. 2001; div. 2018)
- Children: 2
- Education: New College, Oxford (MA, DPhil)
- Occupation: Historian • Politician

Doña Cayetana Álvarez de Toledo y Peralta-Ramos, 15th Marchioness of Casa Fuerte (born 15 October 1974) is a Spanish journalist, historian, and politician of the People's Party. She has served as Member of the Congress of Deputies since 21 May 2019 for Barcelona and was Spokesperson of her party in Congress until 21 August 2020. She is of Spanish and French-Argentine descent.

Álvarez de Toledo was the Member of Congress for the constituency of Madrid in the 9th and 10th Legislatures of the Cortes Generales. She is the Director of International Relations of FAES. Since her return to journalism, she has written for the daily newspaper El Mundo.

== Biography ==
Álvarez de Toledo was born in Madrid to a French father and an Argentine mother. She is the daughter of Juan Illán Álvarez de Toledo y Giraud, the 14th Marquess of Casa Fuerte, who fought as part of the French Resistance during the Second World War, and of Patricia Peralta-Ramos y Madero. She is a citizen of Argentina, France and Spain.

After spending the first seven years of her childhood in London, Álvarez de Toledo moved to Buenos Aires and enrolled in Northlands School. She returned to the United Kingdom for her university studies. She obtained a BA in Modern History with honours at New College, University of Oxford, and was made an honorary senior scholar at New College. In 2000, she obtained a PhD in Modern History with her dissertation on Juan de Palafox, Viceroy of New Spain, under John H. Elliott.

After obtaining her PhD, Álvarez de Toledo became an editor for the daily newspaper El Mundo in September 2000. She was also a guest on the Cadena COPE talk show The Morning, hosted by Federico Jiménez Losantos. She married Spanish businessman and her distant cousin Joaquín Güell (from the family of the Marquesses of Comillas and Counts of Güell) on 20 October 2001. They had two daughters but they divorced in January 2018.

=== Political career ===
In 2006, Álvarez de Toledo was appointed Chief of Staff of the leader of the People's Party (PP), Ángel Acebes, with the task of advising Acebes regarding political strategy, managing his agenda and coordinating his speeches in parliament. She obtained Spanish nationality in 2007 and stood for the 2008 general election as a member of the People's Party for the constituency of Madrid, as number nine on the list, becoming a Member of Parliament in the 9th Cortes Generales. She served as a Deputy Spokesperson of the People's Party Parliamentary Group. She was re-elected in 2011. As a result of her father's death in Paris in 2012, she inherited the title of Marchioness of Casa Fuerte (she is the 15th holder of the title) a year later.

In 2014, Álvarez de Toledo wrote an article in the Financial Times protesting the separatist direction in which Catalan nationalism was perceived to be heading. In 2014 she launched the constitutionalist manifesto Free and Equal. The manifesto rejected all concessions to the Catalan nationalists who desired independence. She was the spokesperson of the homonymous organisation which seeks to involve the Spanish citizenry in the defense of the constitutional provisions of equality for all Spaniards. Among the events organised by Free and Equal was the one which took place on 11 September 2014, the triennial of the defeat of the pro-Habsburg forces in Barcelona during the War of the Spanish Succession, in the Círculo de Bellas Artes of Madrid, where she also gave a speech.

In 2016, Álvarez de Toledo criticised the Cabalgata de Reyes organised by the City Council of Madrid in a tweet, stating: "My 6-year old daughter: 'Mom, this Gaspar's costume isn't real' I will never forgive you for this, Manuela Carmena. Never." The tweet received more than six thousand replies and twelve thousand retweets. On 8 March 2018, she criticised the feminist strike taking place on that same day in a newspaper article. In June 2018 she published an opinion piece after the dissolution of the Mariano Rajoy government resulting from the no confidence motion sponsored by the PSOE. She confirmed that she was still a People's Party member, but voted for the liberal centre-right party Ciudadanos, and she asked for the merging of the two parties.

On 15 March 2019, it was announced that Álvarez de Toledo would run first in the PP list for the Congress of Deputies in the Barcelona constituency in the 28 April 2019 general election. As result of the election she became a member of the lower house, effectively assuming office on 21 May 2019. In July, the party's leader, Pablo Casado, announced that she would be the party's spokesperson for the 13th Congress of Deputies. She continued in the position in the 14th Congress of Deputies until 21 August 2020.

== Arms ==
Heraldry of Cayetana Álvarez de Toledo, 15th Marchioness of Casa Fuerte

Coat of Arms as Marchioness of Casa Fuerte
(2013–present)
