= Villafranca del Bierzo =

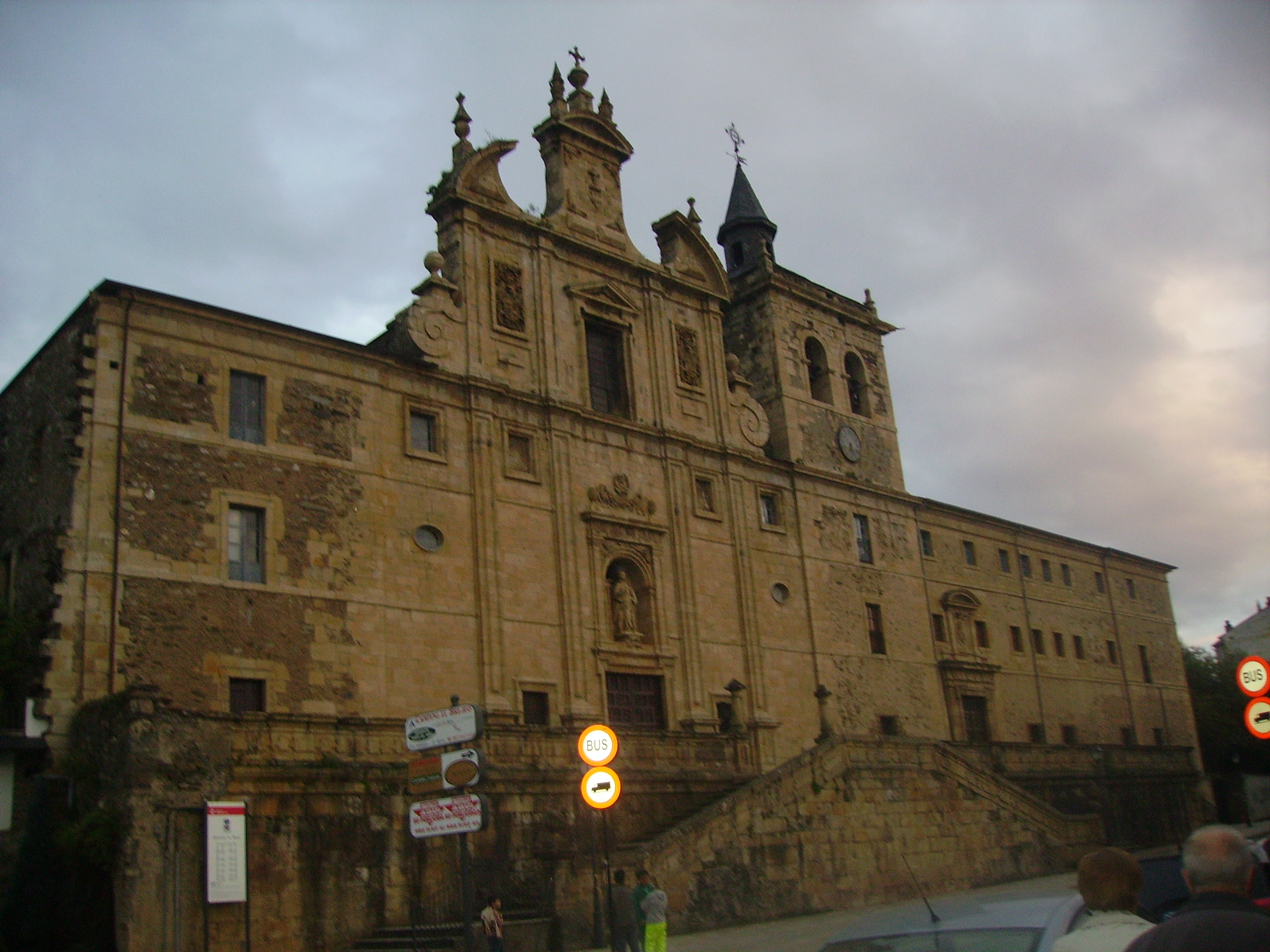
- Convento de Padres Paúles. (Priory of the Paulist Fathers)

- Coat of arms

- Location in Spain Villafranca del Bierzo (Spain)
- Coordinates: 42°36′27″N 6°48′27″W
- Country: Spain
- Autonomous community: Castile and León
- Province: León
- Comarca: El Bierzo
- Judicial district: Ponferrada

Government
  - Mayor: Anderson Batista Rojas (PSOE)

Area
  - Total: 177.37 km^{2} (68.48 sq mi)
- Elevation: 505 m (1,657 ft)

Population (2025-01-01)
  - Total: 2,591
  - Density: 14.61/km^{2} (37.83/sq mi)
- Demonym: Villafranquinos
- Time zone: UTC+1 (CET)
  - Summer (DST): UTC+2 (CEST)
- Climate: Csb
- Website: Official website

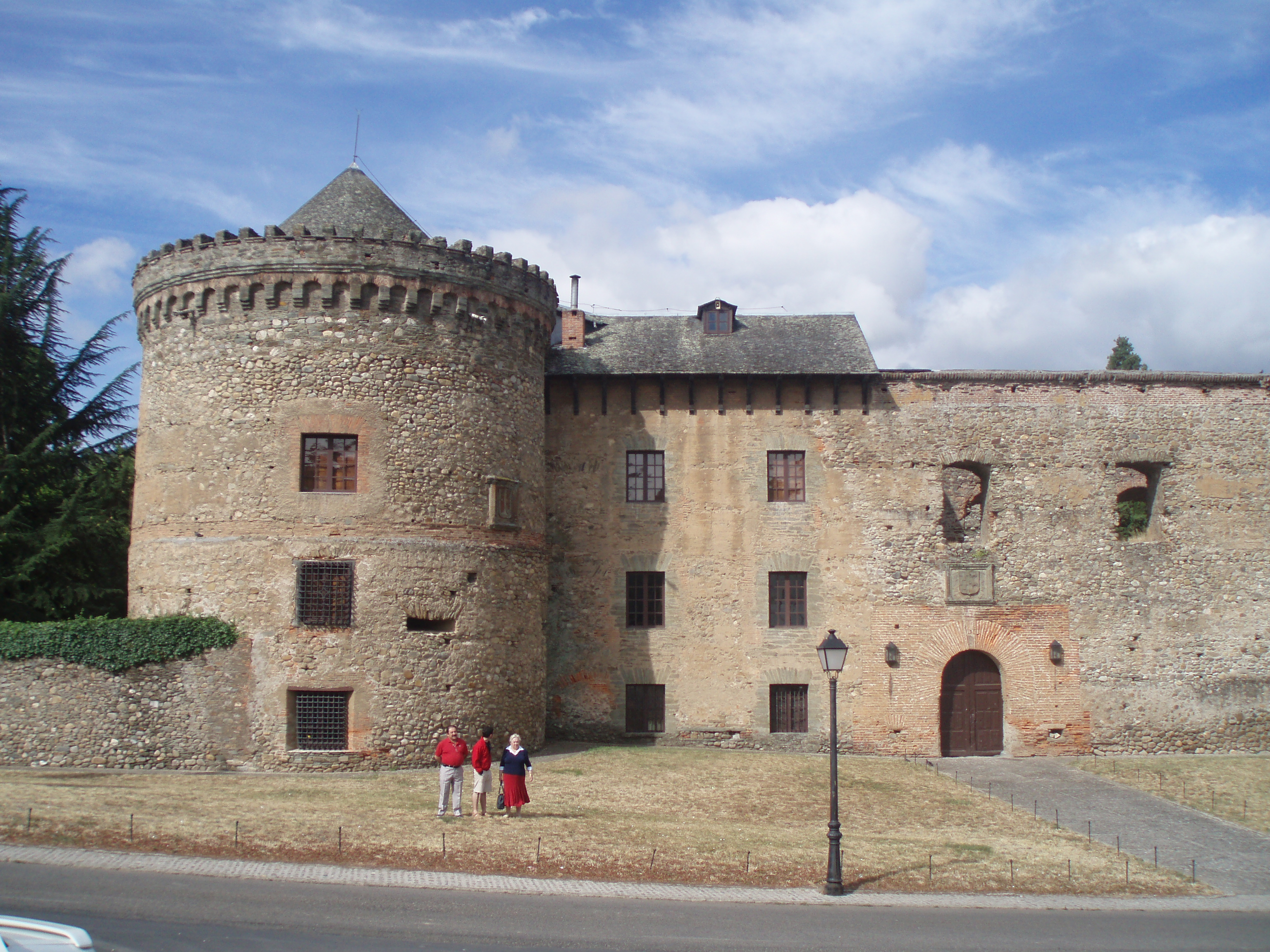
Castle of Villafranca.

Villafranca del Bierzo (Leonese language: Villafranca del Bierzu) is a village and municipality located in the comarca of El Bierzo, in the province of León, Castile and León, Spain.

Villafranca del Bierzo lies 187 kilometers from Santiago de Compostela and is located between Ponferrada and O Cebreiro on the Way of St. James pilgrimage route to Santiago de Compostela.

== History ==
The first human settlements in the area date to the Neolithic age, while the first historically known people living here were the Celtiberians, who lived in Bergidum, later known as Bergidum Flavium after the Roman conquest.

In the Middle Ages, the town is first mentioned in 791. The origin of the modern town is connected to the Way of St. James, as a rest place for the pilgrims on their way to Santiago de Compostela beginning in the 9th century. In the Codex Calixtinus Villafranca is mentioned as an intermediate stage between Rabornal and Triacastela. In 1070, during the reign of Alfonso VI of León, a Cluniac monastery was founded here to cultivate wine, and a borough of French pilgrims rose around it, from which the town's name (meaning "French Town") stems. Numerous hotels and hospitals were established in the town for the pilgrims.

In the late 12th century Alfonso VII of León gave the lordship of Villafranca to his sister Sancha. Later it went to Urraca, wife of King Ferdinand II and then to Teresa, wife of Alfonso IX, and then to numerous other noble people. In 1486 the lordship became a marquisate assigned to Luis Pimentel y Pacego: his daughter married Pedro Álvarez de Toledo, whose family thenceforth held the marquisate for centuries. In 1619 saint Lawrence of Brindisi was brought here after his death in Lisbon and buried in the Monastery of the Assumption, which still contains his spoils.

During the Peninsular War Villafranca was the headquarters of the Galician army and was sacked three times by the English troops, and was later occupied by the French troops. The Spanish general Antonio Filangieri died here. The town was freed in 1810.

== Main sights ==
- Collegiate church of Santa María (16th-17th centuries)
- Church of St. John (12th century)
- Church of St. Nicholas (17th century)
- Church of Santiago the Apostle (12th-13th centuries)
- Monastery of the Annunciation: hosts the spoils of saint Lawrence of Brindisi
- Monastery of St. Francis de Asís (13th century), of which only the late Romanesque church remains, with the upper façade and the two bell towers added in Baroque style during the 18th century.
- Castle of the Counts of Pena Ramiro (16th century), with four towers
- Palace of the Marquisses of Villafrance (18th century)
- Palace of Torquemada (18th century)

== Villages ==
The municipality comprises several villages:

- Villafranca del Bierzo
- Vilela
- Valtuille de Arriba
- Valtuille de Abajo
- Paradaseca
- Puente de Rey
- Cela
- Ribón
- Veguellina
- Tejeira
- Villar de Acero
- Campo del Agua
- Aira da Pedra
- Pobladura de Somoza
- Prado de Paradiñas
- Prado de la Somoza

== Local festivities ==
- January 28, Santo Tirso
- February 3, San Blas
- May 1, Festa do Maio
- June, Poetry festivity
- July 25, Santiago
- August, Tourist festivities
- September 14, El Cristo

== Marquesses of Villafranca del Bierzo ==
- 1st Luis Pimentel y Pacheco (1486-1497)
- 2nd Pedro Álvarez de Toledo (1497-1539)
- 3rd Fadrique Álvarez de Toledo y Osorio; no issue (1539-1569)
- 4th García Álvarez de Toledo, brother (1569-1577)
- 5th Pedro Álvarez de Toledo (1577-1627)
- 6th García Álvarez de Toledo; no Issue; brother of Fadrique Álvarez de Toledo y Mendoza (1627-1649)
- 7th Fadrique Álvarez de Toledo y Ponce de León; son of Mendoza (1649-1705)
- 8th José Fadrique Álvarez de Toledo Osorio y Córdoba y Cardona (1705-1728)
- 9th Fadrique Vicente Álvarez de Toledo; married sister of 13th Duke of Medina Sidonia (1728-1753)
- 10th Antonio Álvarez de Toledo y Pérez de Guzmán (1753-1773)
- 11th José Álvarez de Toledo, Duke of Alba (1773-1796)
- 12th Francisco de Borja Álvarez de Toledo Osorio (1796-1821)
- 13th Pedro de Alcántara Álvarez de Toledo y Palafox (1821-1867)
- 14th José Álvarez de Toledo y Silva (1867-1900)
- 15th Joaquín Álvarez de Toledo y Caro (1900-1915)
- 16th Joaquín Álvarez de Toledo y Caro (1915-1955)
- 17th Luisa Isabel Álvarez de Toledo y Maura (1957-2008)
- 18th Leoncio Alonso González de Gregorio y Álvarez de Toledo (since 2010)

== Church of Saint Nicolas ==
The Church of Saint Nicolas (Iglesia de San Nicolas) was founded in 1638 and is currently run by the Paulist Fathers. The costs of the original construction were paid by Gabriel Robles, a native son who got rich mining silver in Peru.
