= Marquess of Villamayor de las Ibernias =

Title in the Peerage of Spain

- Coat of arms of the Marquess of Villamayor de las Ibernias
- Creation date: 7 April 1617
- Created by: Philip III of Spain
- First holder: Pacheco de Córdoba Bocanegra
- Present holder: Olimpia Cotoner y Vidal

The Marquess of Villamayor de las Ibernias (Spanish: Marqués de Villamayor de las Ibernias) is a title of Spanish nobility that was created on 7 April 1617 by King Philip III in favor of Francisco Pacheco de Córdoba y Bocanegra.

== History ==
Francisco Pacheco de Córdoba y Bocanegra, 1st Adelantado of the Kingdom of Nueva Galicia in New Spain, Knight of the Order of Santiago and Lord of Villamayor de las Ibernias, which he bought in 1613.

The title was rehabilitated in 1918 by King Alfonso XIII in favor of María Luisa Cotoner y Álvarez de las Asturias Bohorques, 8th Marchioness of Bélgida, etc., niece of the 12th Marquess, who thus became the 13th Marchioness of Villamayor de las Ibernias.

== List of title holders ==
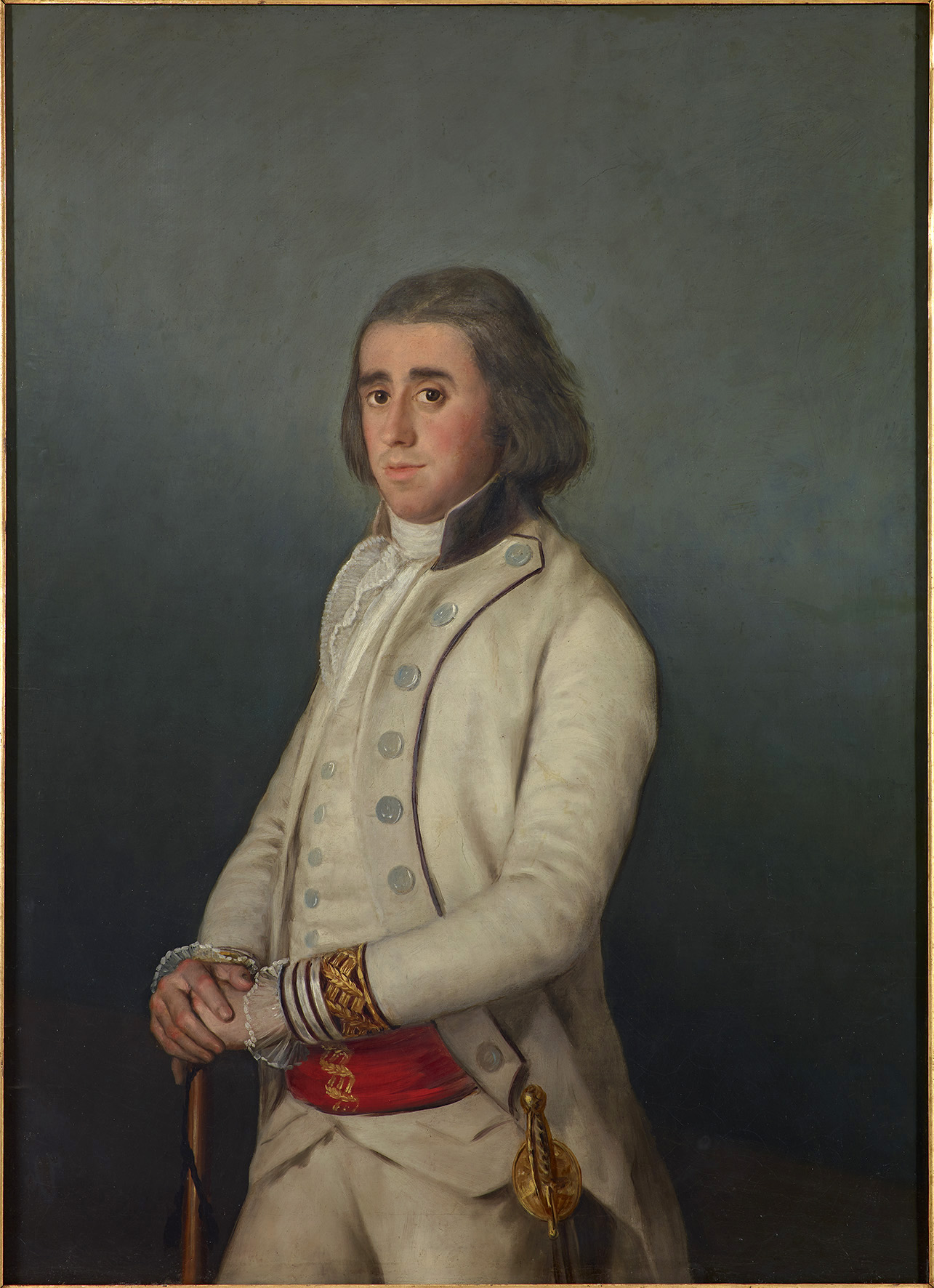
Portrait of Don Valentín Bellvís de Moncada y Pizarro, second son of the 8th Marquess and brother of the 9th Marquess, by Francisco Goya, 1795.

	Holder of Title	Period	Notes
Created by King Philip IIII of Spain
1	Francisco Pacheco de Córdoba Bocanegra Vázquez de Coronado y Estrada	1617–1618	(Note: Francisco Pacheco de Córdoba Bocanegra Vázquez de Coronado y Estrada (1560–1618), was the grandson of Francisco Vázquez de Coronado and Doña Beatriz de Estrada (youngest daughter of Alonso de Estrada, the Governor of New Spain).)
2	Carlos Pacheco de Córdoba Bocanegra y Colón de la Cueva	1618–1646	
3	Francisco Domingo de Córdoba Colón de Bocanegra	1646–1668	
4	Diego Antonio Fernando de Córdoba Colón de Bocanegra	1668–1693	
5	María Eugenia de Córdoba Colón de Bocanegra Portugal y Berghes	1693–1694	
6	Francisca María Bellvís y Córdoba	1694–1733	
7	José Vicente Bellvís de Moncada y Exarch de Bellvís	1733–1753	
8	Pascual Benito Bellvis de Moncada e Ibáñez de Segovia	1753–1781	
9	Juan de la Cruz Bellvís de Moncada y Pizarro	1781–1835	(Note: Juan de la Cruz Bellvís de Moncada y Pizarro (1756–1835), married María de la Encarnación Álvarez de Toledo, sister of Francisco de Borja Álvarez de Toledo, 12th Marquis of Villafranca.)
10	Antonio Ciriaco Bellvís de Moncada y Toledo	1835–1842	
11	José Álvarez de las Asturias Bohorques y Bellvís de Moncada	1842–1852	
12	Íñigo Álvarez de las Asturias Bohorques y Álvarez de las Asturias	1857–1883	
Rehabilitated by King Alfonso XIII of Spain
13	María Luisa Cotoner y Álvarez de las Asturias Bohorques	1918–1942	(Note: Maria Luisa Cotoner y Álvarez de las Asturias Bohorques, 13th Marchioness of Villamayor de las Ibernias (1879–1948), also Marchioness of Bélgida, Marchioness of Adeje (rehabilitated in 1918), Marchioness of Orellana la Vieja (rehabilitated in 1918), Countess of Villardompardo; she was the daughter of María del Carmen Álvarez de Asturias Bohorques and Álvarez de las Asturias Bohorques, 10th Countess of Sallent, Countess of Villamonte, and 20th Marchioness of Mondéjar Grandee of Spain (sister of the 12th Marquis of Villamayor de las Ibernias), and of her husband José Cotoner y Allendesalazar, son of Fernando Cotoner y Chacón, 1st Marquess of la Cenia; she married her first cousin José Fernando Cotoner y de Veri (1872–1955), 8th Marquess of Ariany, in 1900.)
14	Alonso Cotoner y Cotoner	1957–2003	(Note: Alonso Cotoner y Cotoner, 14th Marquis of Villamayor de las Ibernias (b. 1917), also Count of Sallent; son of the 13th Marchioness.)
15	Íñigo Alfonso Cotoner y Martos	2003–2004	(Note: Íñigo Alfonso Cotoner y Martos, 15th Marquis of Villamayor de las Ibernias (b. 1943), also the Count of Tendilla, Marquess of Mondéjar, Count of Sallent, and Viscount of Ugena; nephew of the 14th Marquess; Íñigo is the son of Nicolás Cotoner, 23rd Marquess of Mondéjar, and María de la Trinidad Martos y Zabalburu, 5th Viscountess of Ugena. He distributed several of his titles between his children.)
16	Olimpia Cotoner y Vidal	2004–	(Note: Olimpia Cotoner y Vidal, 16th Marchioness of Villamayor de las Ibernias (b. 1969), is married to Alfonso Díez de Rivera y Elzaburu, 4th Marquess of Huétor de Santillán and 6th Count of Sanafe.)
