= Carlos José de Witte y Pau =

Spanish army officer (1754–1810)

Carlos José de Witte y Pau, 4th Marquis of Wanmarck, Kingdom of Naples (17 June 1754 – 8 March 1810), was a Spanish army officer.

== Early life ==
He was the son of Carlos Santiago Gerardo de Witte y Fervaque (1712–1782), a native of Bruges in Flanders, and María Antonia Margarita de Pau y Wanmarck (1725-1810), who was born in Bilbao to a Flemish family.

== Career ==
Having enlisted as a cadet in the Walloon Guards in 1771, De Witte rose through the ranks to become a captain in 1794, seeing action in the Spanish–Algerian War from 1775 to 1785 and at the Great Siege of Gibraltar from 1779 to 1783.

In 1794, he was promoted to infantry brigadier and the following year, field marshal. In 1797, he was appointed political and military governor of Badajoz, remaining in that post for almost ten years.

Having been appointed political and military governor of Barcelona in December 1807, Witte took up office in January 1808.

== Peninsular War ==
Following the French invasion (February), Witte abandoned Barcelona and joined Milans del Bosch's army. That October, Witte was commander of Cavalry for the Spanish Army of the Right, under Juan Miguel de Vives. In February 1809, he was given command of Extremadura.

== Personal life ==
In 1800 in Madrid, Witte married María Juana Rodríguez de Alburquerque y Díaz Pardo (1759-1810), the daughter of Antonio Rodríguez de Alburquerque and Josefa Antonia de Pardo. Together, they were the parents of five children:

- Juan de Witte y Rodríguez de Alburquerque (1782–1834)
- María Ángeles de Witte y Rodríguez de Alburquerque (1783–1805)
- María Antonia de Witte y Rodríguez de Alburquerque (1785–1837), who married Manuel Lorenzo de Acuña, 9th Marquis of Gramedo, 10th Marquis of Bedmar, and 8th Marquis of Casa Fuerte.
- María Dolores de Witte y Rodríguez de Alburquerque (b. 1789)
- Carlos María de Witte y Rodríguez de Alburquerque (b. 1792).

Witte died in Badajoz on 8 March 1810.
