= Garciez =

Settlement in Jaén Province, Andalusia, Spain

- Municipality
- Concello de Garciez
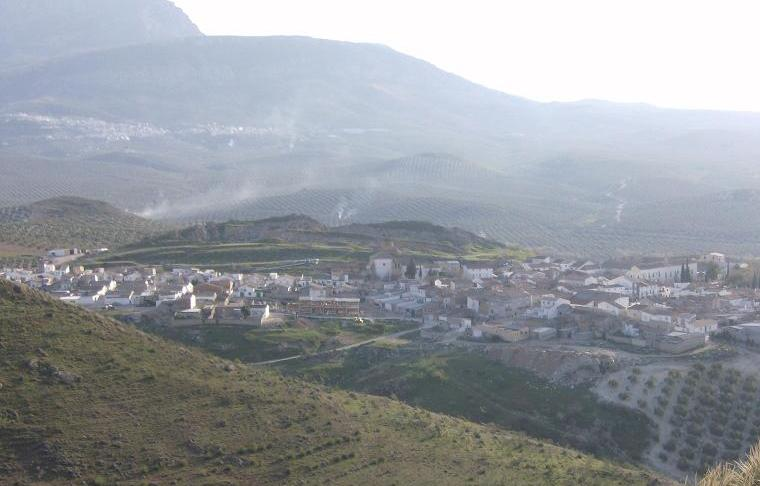
- Interactive map of Garciez
- Country: Spain
- Autonomous community: Andalusia
- Province: Huelva

Population
  - Total: 497
- Time zone: UTC+1 (CET)
  - Summer (DST): UTC+2 (CEST)

Garciez (Spanish pronunciation: [ɡaɾˈθjeθ]) is a small rural town in the Spanish autonomous community of Andalusia, surrounded completely by farmlands, near the Pantano Grande, its population is 497.

== See also ==
- List of municipalities in Jaén
