= Free and Equal (Spain) =

Spanish civic organisation

- Libres e Iguales
- Formation: July 15, 2014; 11 years ago
- Type: Civic platform
- Legal status: Voluntary association
- Key people: Cayetana Álvarez de Toledo
- Website: www.libreseiguales.es

Free and Equal (Spanish: Libres e Iguales) is a Spanish civic organisation formed as a reaction against Catalan nationalism. It is opposed to Catalan independence, viewing it as an attack on Spanish institutions and Spanish democracy.

== History ==
The organisation's name alludes to article 1 of the Declaration of the Rights of Man and of the Citizen ("Men are born and remain free and equal in rights. Social distinctions can be founded only on the common good."), as well as the first article of the Universal Declaration of Human Rights ("All human beings are born free and equal in dignity and rights. They are endowed with reason and conscience and should act towards one another in a spirit of brotherhood.").

It was launched on 15 July 2014 outside the Congress of Deputies, with headline manifesto promises of "reclaiming the 1978 Spanish constitution", rejecting the "breakup" of the national sovereignty of Spanish people, and a search for a pact of major Spanish political parties against secessionism.

Following the 2015 local and regional elections, the group called for the People's Party, the Socialist Workers' Party, Union, Progress and Democracy and Citizens to create a pact against populism, with the objective of "preventing populist contamination from lethally eroding the institutions and fundamental bases of Spanish democracy".

On 8 January 2025, the movement published a manifesto titled Against Franco, calling for a boycott of events commemorating the 50th anniversary of dictator Francisco Franco's death.

== Objectives ==
According to the movement, its aims are "defending democratic principles, mobilising Spanish society against Catalan independence, and delegitimising nationalism".
