= Adriana Maldonado López =

Spanish politician (born 1990)

Adriana Maldonado López MEP
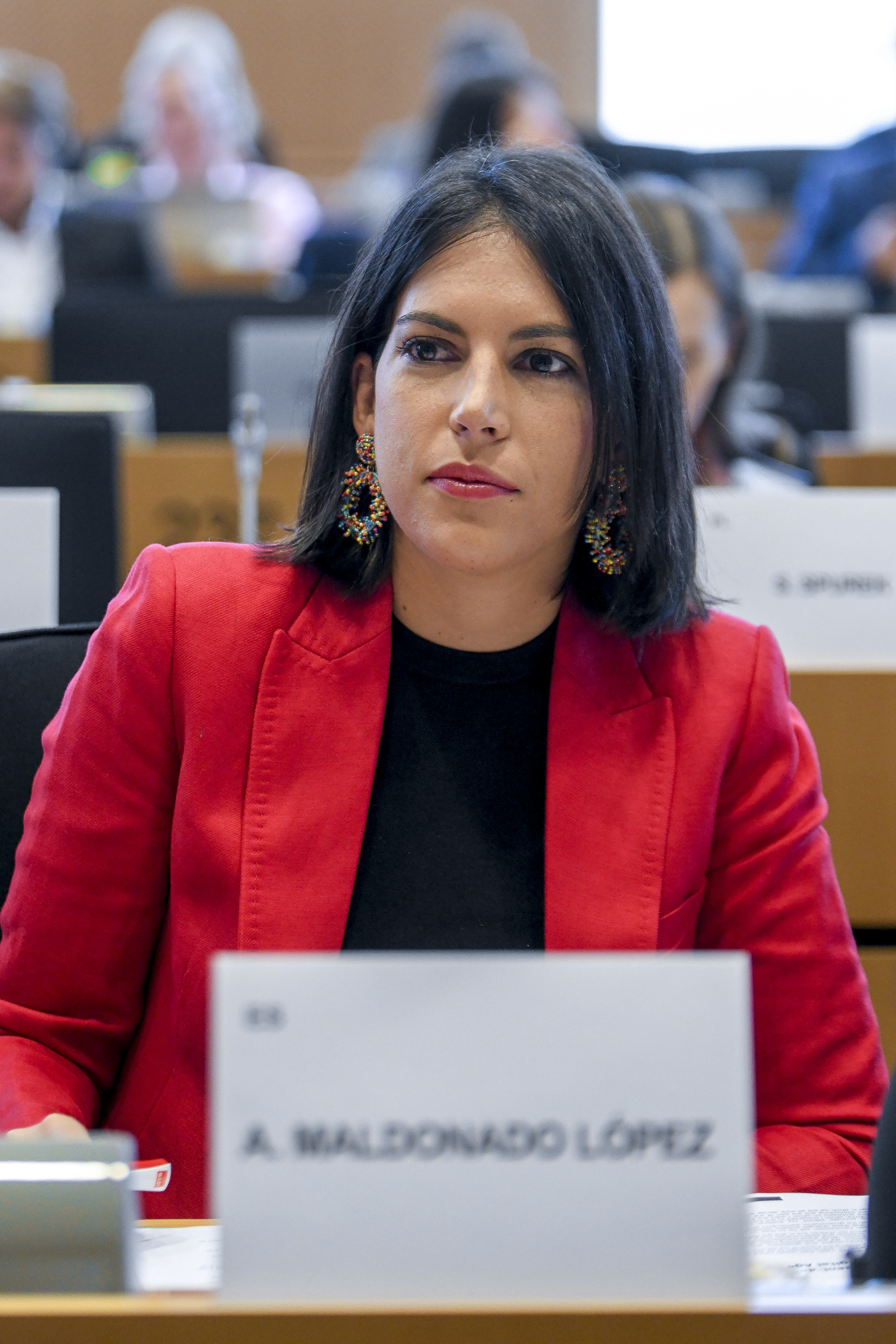
- Adriana Maldonado López, member of the European Parliament since 2019

Member of the European Parliament for Spain
- In office 2 July 2019 – 16 August 2023
- Succeeded by: Laura Ballarin Cereza

Member of the Congress of Deputies
- Incumbent
- Assumed office 17 August 2023
- Constituency: Navarre

Personal details
- Born: 9 January 1990 (age 36) Pamplona, Spain
- Party: Spanish Socialist Workers' Party

Adriana Maldonado López (pronounced [aˈðɾjana maldoˈnaðo ˈlopeθ]) is a Spanish politician who has been serving as a Member of the European Parliament since 2019.

== Political career ==
In parliament, Maldonado López has since been serving on the Committee on the Internal Market and Consumer Protection. In 2022, she also joined the Special Committee on the COVID-19 pandemic.

In addition to her committee assignments, Maldonado López has been part of the parliament's delegation for relations with the Pan-African Parliament since 2021. She is also a member of the European Parliament Intergroup on Artificial Intelligence and Digital and the European Parliament Intergroup on Small and Medium-Sized Enterprises (SMEs).

She was elected to the 15th Congress of Deputies in the 2023 Spanish general election from Navarre.
