= Bedmar y Garcíez =

Bedmar y Garcíez, Spain
- city
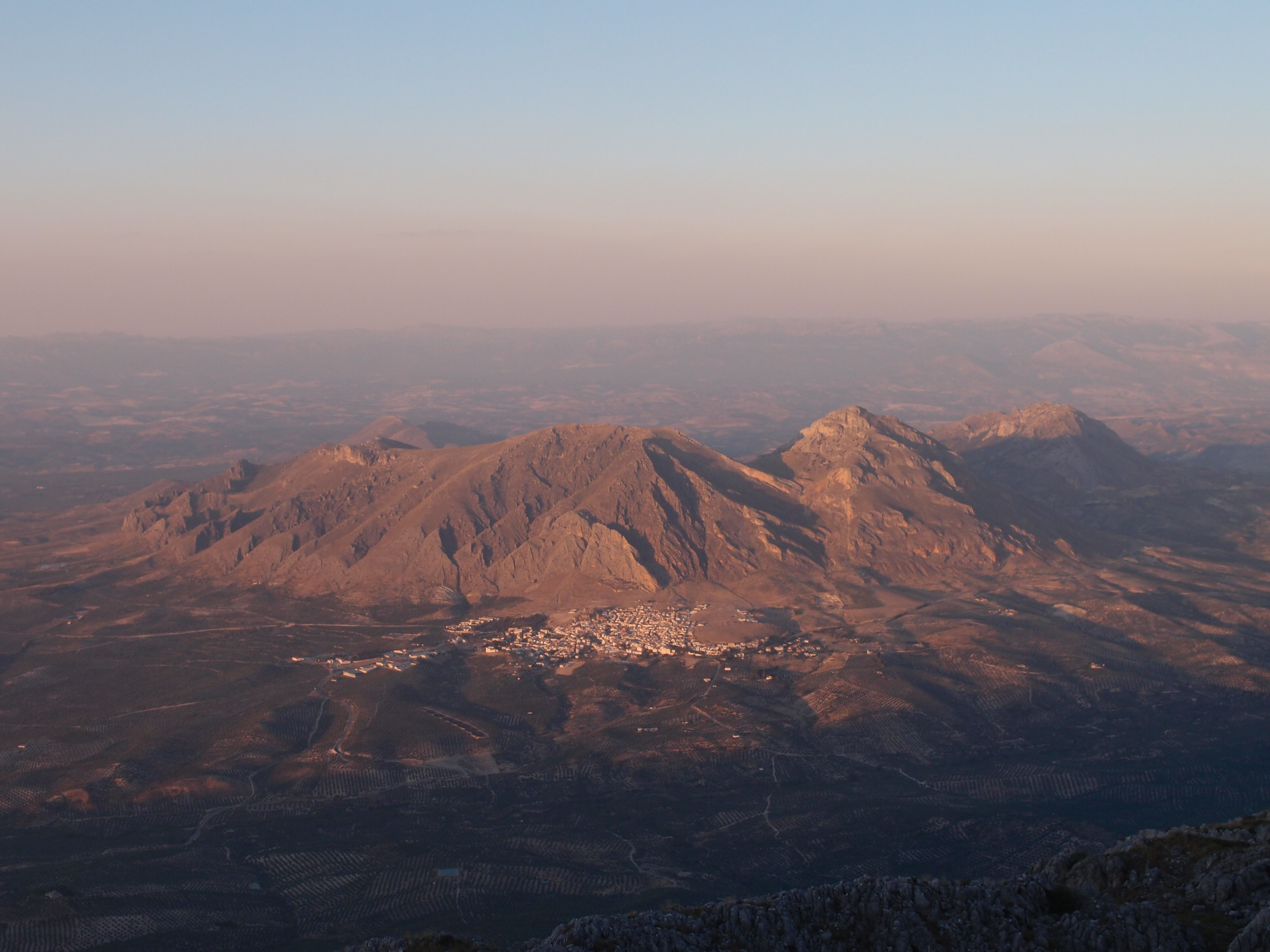

- Coat of arms

- Location in the Province of Jaén Bedmar y Garcíez (Andalusia) Bedmar y Garcíez (Spain)
- Coordinates: 37°49′N 03°24′W
- Country: Spain
- Autonomous community: Andalusia
- Province: Jaén
- Municipality: Bedmar y Garcíez

Area
  - Total: 119 km^{2} (46 sq mi)
- Elevation: 643 m (2,110 ft)

Population (2025-01-01)
  - Total: 2,567
  - Density: 21.6/km^{2} (55.9/sq mi)
- Time zone: UTC+1 (CET)
  - Summer (DST): UTC+2 (CEST)

Bedmar y Garcíez is a city located in the province of Jaén, Spain. According to 2019 INE figures, the municipality had a population of 2,642 inhabitants. Bedmar and Garcíez were independent municipalities until they were merged in 1975.

== Localities ==
- Garciez

== See also ==
- List of municipalities in Jaén
