= Marquess of Casa Fuerte =

Spanish noble title

Marquessate of Casa Fuerte
- Creation date: 12 July 1708
- Created by: Philip V
- Peerage: Peerage of Spain
- First holder: Juan de Acuña y Bejarano, 1st Marquess of Casa Fuerte
- Present holder: Cayetana Álvarez de Toledo y Peralta-Ramos, 15th Marchioness of Casa Fuerte

Marquess of Casa Fuerte (Spanish: Marqués de Casa Fuerte) is a hereditary title in the Peerage of Spain granted in 1708 by Philip V to Juan de Acuña on his merits as Captain General of the Royal Armies. Acuña later became the 37th viceroy of New Spain, between 1722 and 1734.

== Marquesses of Casa Fuerte (1708) ==
- Juan de Acuña y Bejarano, 1st Marquess of Casa Fuerte
- Joaquín José de Acuña y Figueroa, 2nd Marquess of Casa Fuerte
- Juan Manuel de Acuña y Vázquez-Coronado, 3rd Marquess of Casa Fuerte
- Francisco Xavier de Acuña y Prado, 4th Marquess of Casa Fuerte
- Joaquín de Acuña y Prado, 5th Marquess of Casa Fuerte
- Antonio María de Acuña y Fernández-Miranda, 6th Marquess of Casa Fuerte
- Manuel Lorenzo de Acuña y Fernández-Miranda, 7th Marquess of Casa Fuerte
- Manuel Antonio de Acuña y Dewitte, 8th Marquess of Casa Fuerte
- María del Carmen Lucía de Acuña y Dewitte, 9th Marchioness of Casa Fuerte
- Pedro Álvarez de Toledo y Acuña, 10th Marquess of Casa Fuerte
- Illán Álvarez de Toledo y Lèfebvre, 11th Marquess of Casa Fuerte
- Alonso de Heredia y del Rivero, 12th Marquess of Casa Fuerte & 14th Marquess of Bedmar
- Julio Heredia y Halcón, 13th Marquess of Casa Fuerte
- Juan Illán Álvarez de Toledo y Giraud, 14th Marquess of Casa Fuerte
- Cayetana Álvarez de Toledo y Peralta-Ramos, 15th Marchioness of Casa Fuerte

== See also ==
- Viceroyalty of New Spain
