= Gyula Széchényi =

Hungarian politician

Count Gyula Széchényi de Sárvár-Felsővidék
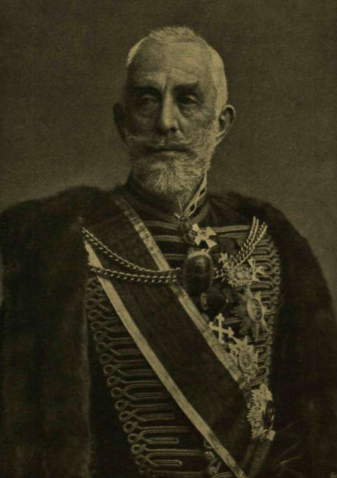

Minister besides the King of Hungary
- In office 29 March 1900 – 27 June 1903
- Preceded by: Kálmán Széll
- Succeeded by: Károly Khuen-Héderváry

Personal details
- Born: 11 November 1829 Vienna, Austrian Empire
- Died: 13 January 1921 (aged 91) Budapest, Kingdom of Hungary
- Party: Liberal Party (Hungary)
- Profession: Politician

Count Gyula Széchényi de Sárvár-Felsővidék (11 November 1829, Vienna – 13 January 1921, Budapest) was a Hungarian politician, who served as Minister besides the King between 1900 and 1903. Széchényi was 70 years old when appointed by Kálmán Széll.

== Early life ==
He was a son of Count Pál Széchényi (1789–1871) and, his second wife, Countess Emilia Zichy-Ferraris de Zich et Vasonkeo (1803–1866). Among his siblings were Countess Erzsébet Széchényi (who married Pedro Caro, 5th Marquess of La Romana), and Count Pál Széchényi, the Hungarian Minister of Agriculture, Industry and Trade.

His paternal grandparents were Count Ferenc Széchényi and Countess Julianna Festetics de Tolna. His maternal grandparents were Count Ferenc Franz Zichy de Zich et Vásonkeö and Marie Wilhelmine von Ferraris (a daughter of Count Joseph de Ferraris). Her sister, Countess Melanie Zichy-Ferraris, was the third wife of Prince Klemens von Metternich.

== Personal life ==
He married Countess Karolina Zichy-Ferraris de Zich et Vásonkeő (1845–1871) on 6 July 1863. They had four children, including:

- Count Andor Pál Széchényi (1864–1943) married, firstly, Countess Andrea Csekonics on 13 October 1894. He married, secondly, Baroness Mária Szegedy-Ensch on 25 March 1925. He had three children.
- Countess Margit Széchényi (1866–1915) married Eugen Graf von Kesselstatt on 20 April 1892 at Opatija, Croatia. They had seven children.
- Countess Karolina Széchényi (1869–1932) married Simon Graf von Wimpffen on 30 May 1890. They had no children.
- Countess Paulina Széchényi (1871–1945) married Aloys Lexa Graf von Aehrenthal on 22 July 1902. They had three children.

His second wife was Paola Klinkosch (1851–1901), they married on 3 February 1875. They had one child.

- Count Gyula József Pál Széchényi (1878–1956) married Gizella Haas von Teichen on 8 December 1908. They had four children.

Count Széchényi died in Budapest on 13 January 1921.

Political offices
Preceded by Kálmán Széll	Minister besides the King; 1900–1903	Succeeded by Károly Khuen-Héderváry
