= José Caro y Széchényi =

Spanish diplomat

Don The Count of Peña Ramiro
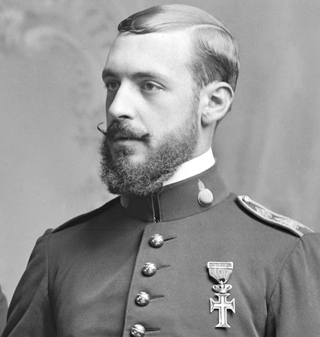
- Caro at Queen Victoria's Diamond Jubilee, 24 June 1897

Spanish Ambassador to Japan
- In office 8 October 1915 – April 1924
- Monarch: Alfonso XIII
- Preceded by: Ramiro Gil de Uribarri
- Succeeded by: Pedro Quartin y del Saz Caballero

Personal details
- Born: José Caro y Széchényi; 21 October 1853
- Died: 1936 (aged 82–83)
- Relations: Pedro Caro, 6th Marquis of La Romana (brother)
- Parent(s): Pedro Caro y Álvarez de Toledo; Erzsebet Széchényi

Don José Caro y Széchényi (21 October 1853 – 1936), styled Count of Peña Ramiro, was a Spanish diplomat who served as Spain's ambassador to Japan.

== Early life ==
Caro was born on 21 October 1853. (Note: Some sources indicate his birth date at 21 October 1863.) He was the second son of Pedro Caro y Álvarez de Toledo, 5th Marquis of La Romana (1827–1890), and Countess Erzsébet "Elisabeth" Széchényi de Sárvár et Felsővidék (1827–1910). His elder brother was Pedro Caro y Széchényi, 6th Marquis of La Romana.

His paternal grandparents were Pedro Caro y Salas, 4th Marquis of La Romana (a son of the 3rd Marquis of La Romana) and Dionisia de Salas y Boixadors. His maternal grandparents were Count Pál Széchényi (a son of Count Ferenc Széchényi), and the former Emilie Zichy-Ferraris. Before his grandparents marriage, his grandfather had been married to, and widowed from, Lady Caroline Meade (a daughter of the 2nd Earl of Clanwilliam). His maternal uncle, Count Pál Széchenyi, was the Minister of Agriculture, Industry and Trade of Hungary from October 1882 to April 1889.

== Career ==
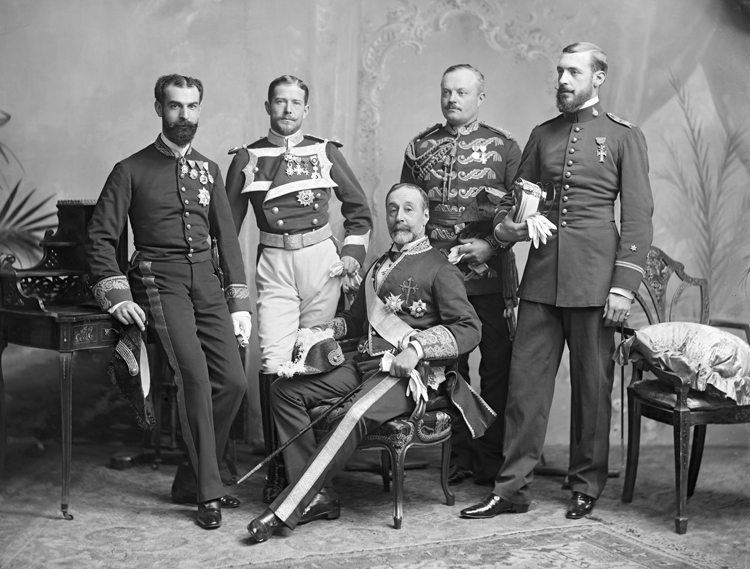
The Count of Peña Ramiro (far right), along with his brother-in-law, The Duke of Sotomayor, at Queen Victoria's Diamond Jubilee, 24 June 1897

On 24 June 1897, Caro and his brother-in-law, Carlos Martínez de Irujo, 8th Duke of Sotomayor, the Special Ambassador appointed by the Queen-Regent of Spain for Queen Victoria's Diamond Jubilee, attended the State Evening Party at Buckingham Palace.

Caro was a career diplomat with postings in Tangier, Sweden, Germany and Japan. From 8 October 1915 to April 1924, he served as Spain's ambassador to Japan in Tokyo. Due to his Hungarian noble ancestry, Hungarian affairs in Japan were handled by the Spanish Embassy in Tokyo.

== Personal life ==
He used the title, Count of Peña Ramiro, which had previously been used by his uncle, Joaquín Caro y Álvarez de Toledo, who served as the Civil Governor of Madrid and as a member of the Congress of Deputies.

The Count of Peña Ramiro, who did not marry, was assassinated during the Spanish Civil War in 1936.
