= Pedro Caro, 6th Marquis of La Romana =

Spanish politician

The Most Excellent The Marquis of La Romana Grandee of Spain
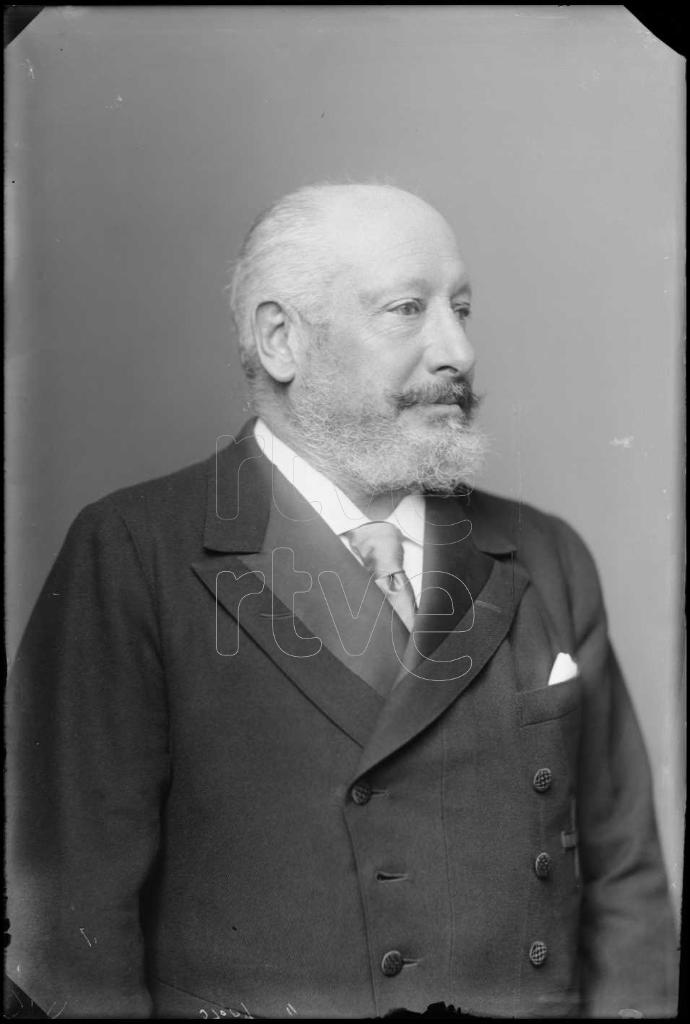
- Photograph of the Marquis, c. 1914
- Born: 3 July 1849; Palma de Mallorca
- Died: 11 April 1916 (aged 66); Madrid, Spain
- Spouse: María de la Piedad Martinez de Irujo
- Children: Pedro Caro y Martínez de Irujo; María de la Piedad Caro y Martínez de Irujo
- Parent(s): Pedro Caro y Álvarez de Toledo; Erzsebet Széchényi

Don Pedro Caro y Széchényi, 6th Marquis of La Romana, Grandee of Spain (3 July 1849 – 11 April 1916) was a Spanish aristocrat and politician.

== Early life ==
Caro was born on 3 July 1849 at Palma de Mallorca. He was the son of Pedro Caro y Álvarez de Toledo, 5th Marquis of La Romana (1827–1888), and Countess Erzsébet "Elisabeth" Széchényi de Sárvár et Felsővidék (1827–1910). His younger brother, José Caro y Széchényi, served as Spain's ambassador to Japan.

His paternal grandparents were Pedro Caro y Salas, 4th Marquis of La Romana (a son of the 3rd Marquis of La Romana) and Dionisia de Salas y Boixadors. His maternal grandparents were Count Pál Széchényi (a son of Count Ferenc Széchényi), and the former Emilie Zichy-Ferraris. Before his grandparents marriage, his grandfather had been married to, and widowed from, Lady Caroline Meade (a daughter of the 2nd Earl of Clanwilliam). His maternal uncle, Count Pál Széchenyi, was the Minister of Agriculture, Industry and Trade of Hungary from October 1882 to April 1889.

== Career ==
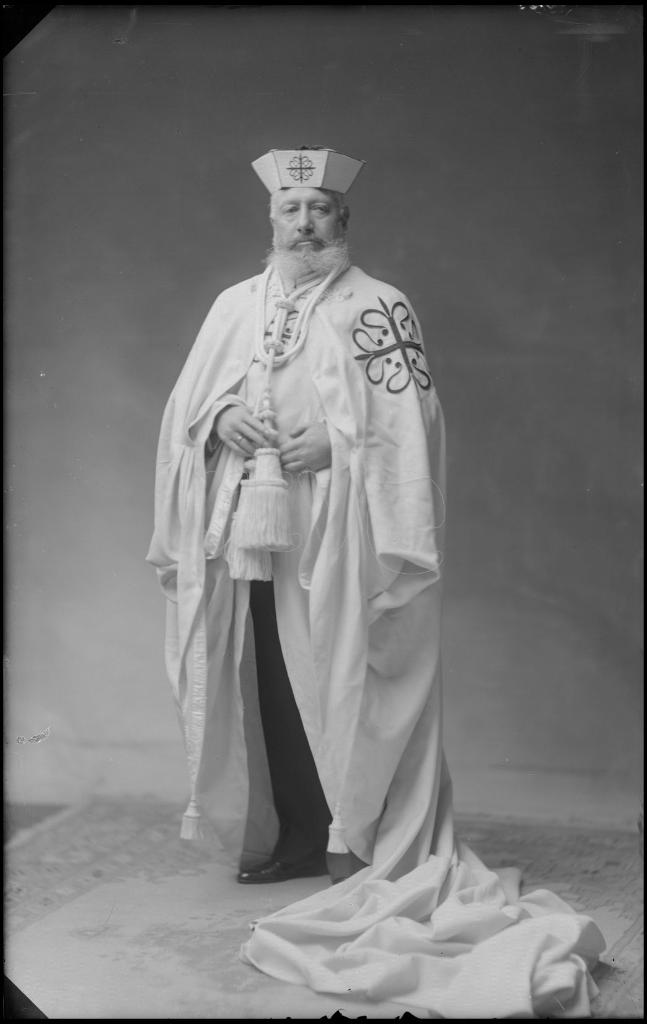
Photograph of the Marquis, in his ceremonial robe

In 1889, he was a Gentlemen of the Bedchamber Grandee of Spain. In 1901, he was made a Clavero of the Order of Montesa.

He was a Member of the Congress of Deputies from 1903 to 1905 and, again, from 1907 to 1910.

== Personal life ==
Caro was married to María de la Piedad Martinez de Irujo y del Alcazar (1851–1898), the daughter of Gabriela del Alcázar, 7th Duchess of Sotomayor, and Carlos Martínez de Irujo, 2nd Marquess of Casa Irujo, who served as the Prime Minister of Spain under Isabella II from January to March 1847. Her brother, Carlos Martínez de Irujo, 8th Duke of Sotomayor, married two of Pedro's sisters, María de la Asunción and, after her death in 1897, María del Pilar, then the widow of José María Guillamas y Piñeiro, the Marquess of San Felices. Together, they were the parents of:

- Pedro Caro y Martínez de Irujo, 7th Marquis of La Romana (1882–1935), who married María de la Asunción Falcó y de la Gandara, 15th Marchioness of Almonacid de los Oteros, in 1916.
- María de la Piedad Caro y Martínez de Irujo, 1st Duchess of Santo Buono (1884–1965), who married Diego del Alcázar y Roca de Togores, 9th Marquess of Peñafuente.

The Marquis died on 11 April 1916 at the Palacio del Príncipe de Anglona in Madrid.

Spanish nobility
| Preceded by Pedro Caro y Álvarez de Toledo | Marquis of La Romana; 1888–1916 | Succeeded by Pedro Caro y Martínez de Irujo |
