= Pál Széchényi (1789–1871) =

Hungarian politician (1789–1871)

Pál Széchenyi
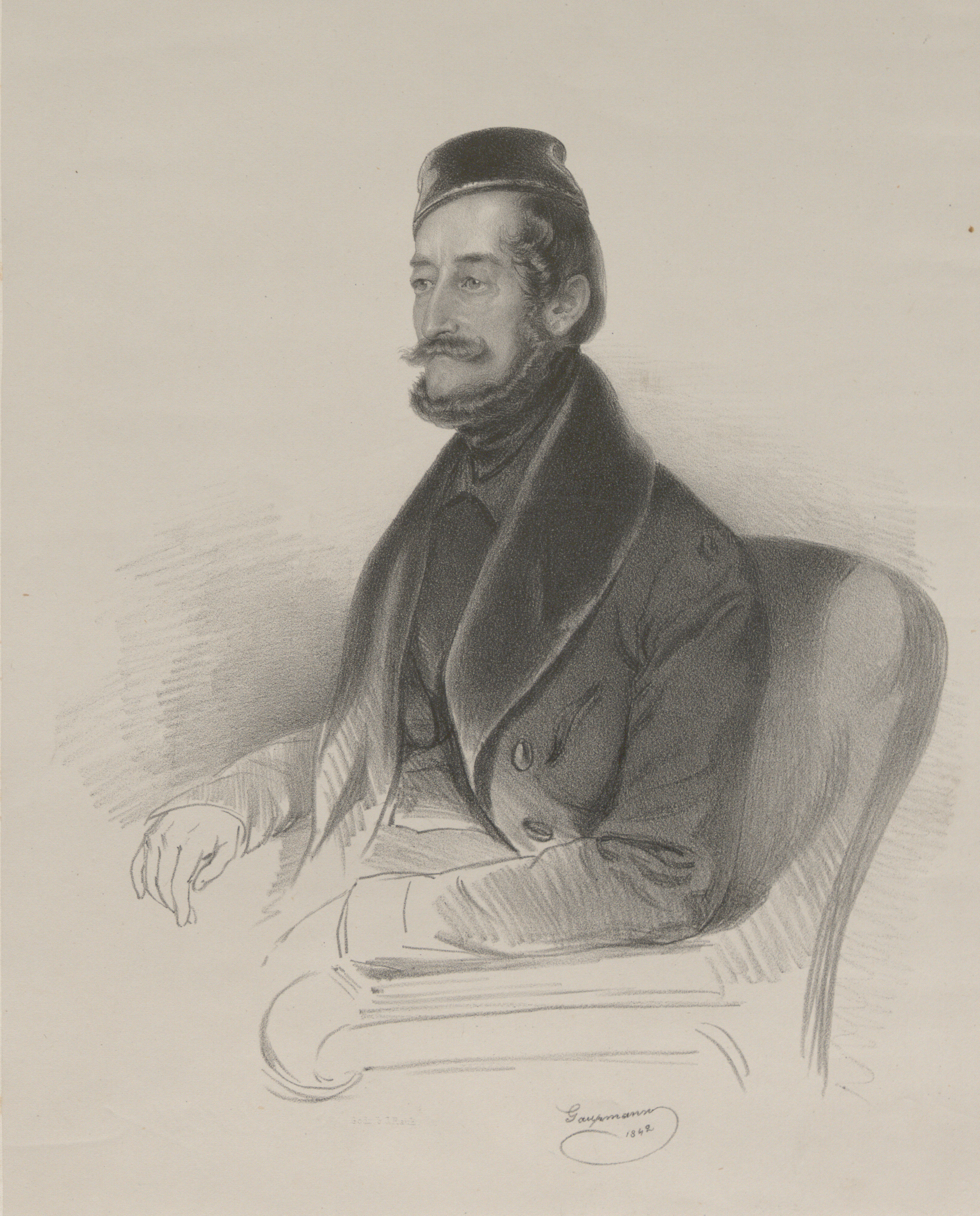
- Lithograph of Count Széchényi, after Rudolf Gaupmann, 1842

Personal details
- Born: 10 November 1789 Vienna, Archduchy of Austria
- Died: 30 March 1871 (aged 81) Sopron, Austria-Hungary
- Spouse(s): Lady Caroline Meade (m. 1811; died 1820) Emilia Zichy-Ferraris (m. 1823; died 1866)
- Relations: István Széchenyi (brother)
- Parent(s): Ferenc Széchényi; Julianna Festetics de Tolna
- Profession: Politician

Count Pál Széchényi de Sárvár-Felsővidék (10 November 1789 – 30 March 1871) was a Hungarian politician who was an Imperial and Royal Chamberlain.

== Early life ==
Széchényi was born in Vienna on 10 November 1789. He was the son of Count Ferenc János József Széchenyi de Sárvár-Felsővidék and Countess Julianna Mária Anna Katalin Festetics de Tolna (1753–1824). Among his surviving siblings were Count Lajos Maria Aloys Széchényi (who married Countess Aloisia von Clam und Gallas); After her death in 1822, he married Countess Franziska von Wurmbrand-Stuppach.; Countess Franciska Karoline Batthyany (who married Count Miklós Batthyány); Countess Zsófia "Sophia" Zichy (who married Count Ferdinánd Zichy-Vázsonykő); and Count István Széchenyi.

His paternal grandparents were Count Zsigmond Széchényi, and Countess Mária Cziráky of Cirák and Dénesfalva. His maternal grandparents were Count Pál Festetics de Tolna and Coutness Julianna Mária Borbála Bossányi de Nagybossány (a daughter of Imre Bossányi de Nagybossány).

== Career ==
He inherited the Lábod manor in Somogy County from his father.

A lieutenant colonel, Count Széchényi served as an Imperial and Royal Chamberlain to the Emperor.

== Personal life ==
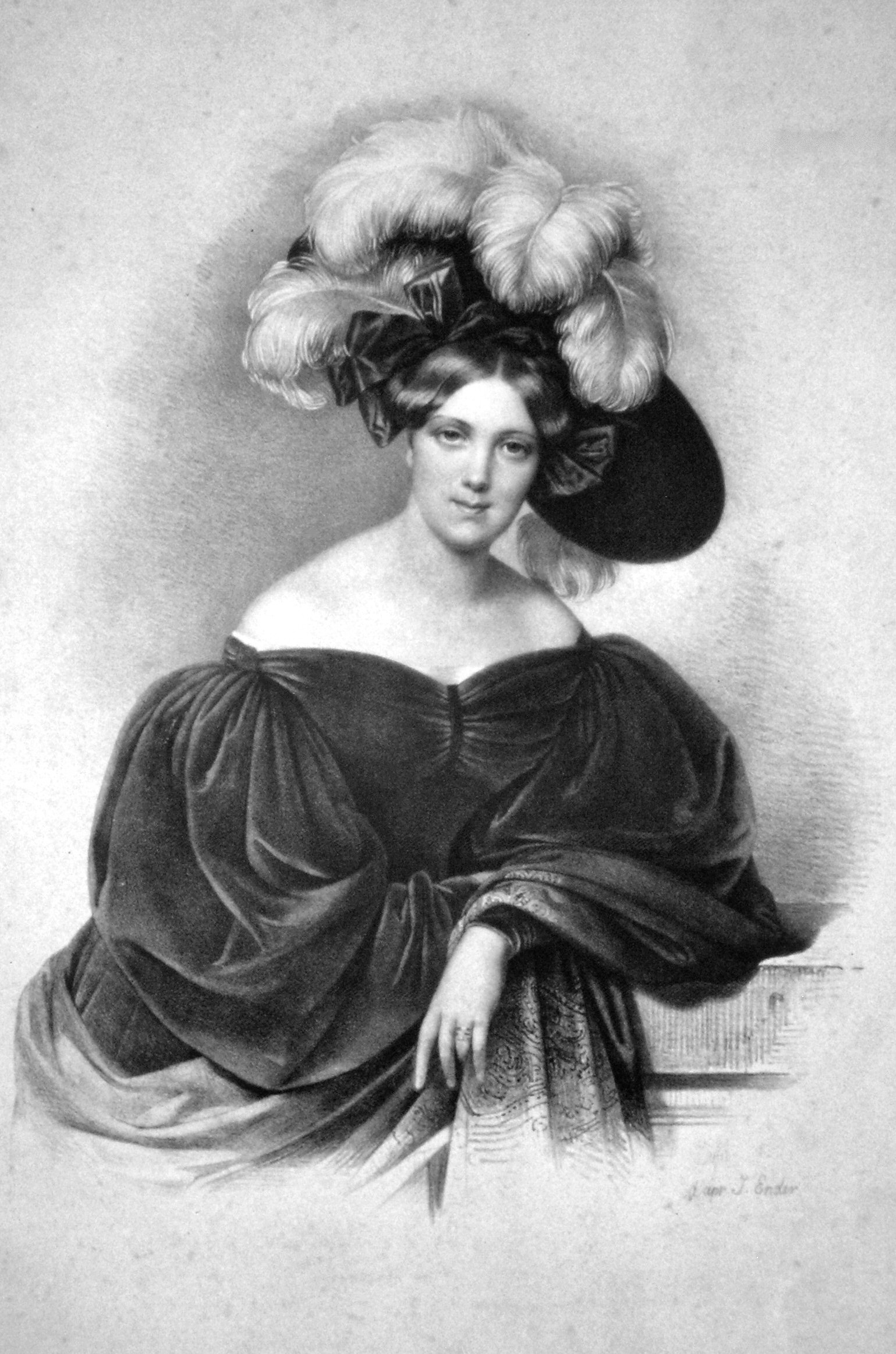
Lithograph of his second wife, Countess Emilie, by Franz Eybl, 1833

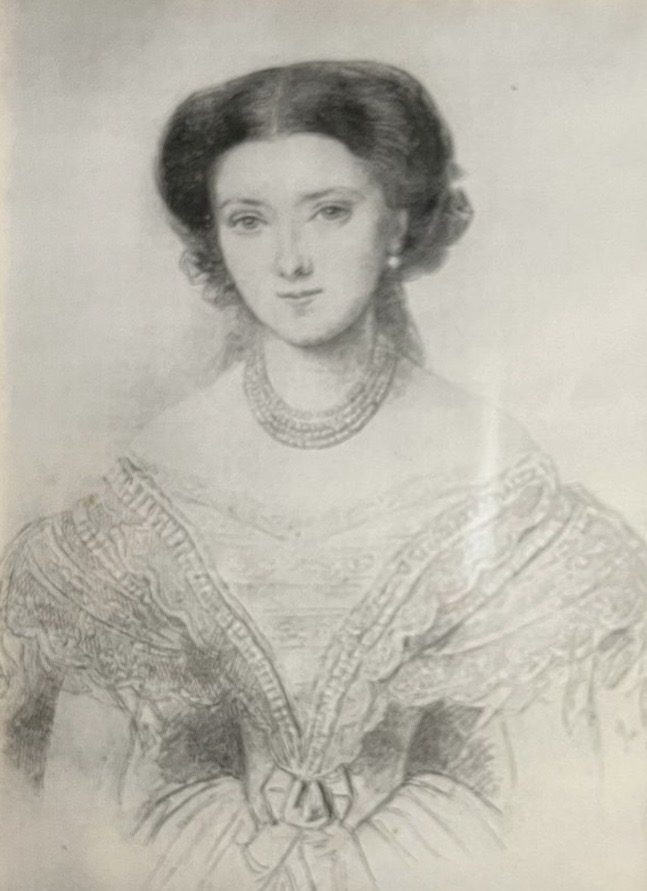
Drawing of his daughter, Countess Erzsébet Széchényi c. 1847

On 10 June 1811, Széchényi married Lady Caroline Meade (1794–1820), the eldest daughter of Irish peer Richard Meade, 2nd Earl of Clanwilliam and Countess Marie-Caroline von Thun und Hohenstein (a daughter of Count Franz Josef Anton von Thun und Hohenstein and Countess Maria Wilhelmine Uhlfeldt, herself the daughter of Count Anton Corfiz Ulfeldt). Before her death in 1820, they were the parents of:

- Count Andor "Andras" Széchényi (1812–1842), who died unmarried.
- Countess Maria Széchényi (1813–1813), who died young.

After her death, he married Countess Emilia Zichy-Ferraris de Zich et Vasonkeo (1803–1866) on 15 December 1823 in Vienna. She was a daughter of Count Ferenc Franz Zichy de Zich et Vásonkeö (son of Count Károly Zichy) and Marie Wilhelmine von Ferraris (a daughter of Count Joseph de Ferraris). Her sister, Countess Melanie Zichy-Ferraris, was the third wife of Prince Klemens von Metternich. Together, they were the parents of:

- Count Kalman Széchényi (1824–1914), who married Karoline von Grunne, a daughter of Count Karl Ludwig von Grünne and Karoline von und zu Trauttmansdorff-Weinsberg.
- Countess Maria Széchényi (1825–1849), who died unmarried.
- Countess Erzsébet "Elisabeth" Széchényi (1827–1910), who married Pedro Caro, 5th Marquess of La Romana, the son of Pedro Caro, 4th Marquis of La Romana, and Maria Álvarez de Toledo y Palafox, Duchess of Montalto, in 1848.
- Count Gábor "Gabriel" Széchényi (1828–1921), who married Felicia Horváth de Szentgyörgy, a daughter of Anton Horvath de Szentgyörgy and Baroness Paulina Orczy de Orczi.
- Count Gyula Széchényi (1829–1921), the Minister besides the King of Hungary; he married Countess Karolina Zichy-Ferraris de Zich et Vásonkeő in 1863. After her death in 1871, he married Paola Klinkosch in 1875.
- Count Géza Széchényi (1830–1832), who died young.
- Count Kalman Széchényi (1833–1839), who died young.
- Count Ferenc "Franz" Széchényi (1835–1908), who married Countess Franciska Erdödy de Monyorókerék et Monoszló, a daughter of Count István Erdödy and Baroness Jusztina Müller-Hörnstein.
- Count Jenyő "Eugen" Széchényi (1836–1911), who married Countess Henriette Erdödy de Monyorókerék et Monoszló, also a daughter of Count István Erdödy.
- Count Tivadar "Theodor" Széchényi (1837–1912), who married Countess Johanna Erdödy de Monyorókerék et Monoszló, also a daughter of Count István Erdödy.
- Count Pál Kalman Ferenc de Paula Széchényi (1838–1901), who married Countess Erzsébet Andrássy de Csíkszentkirály, a daughter of Count György Andrássy and Countess Franziska zu Königsegg-Aulendorf.
- Countess Dorottya Franciska Julia Maria Széchényi (1841–1892), who married Heinrich von Pereira-Arnstein, a son of Baron August von Pereira-Arnstein (a son of Henriette von Pereira-Arnstein) and Countess Seraphina Sophia Amadé de Várkony (a granddaughter of Count Antal Amade de Várkony).

Count Széchényi died in Sopron on 30 March 1871.
