= Pedro Caro, 4th Marquis of La Romana =

Spanish politician

The Most Excellent The Marquis of La Romana Grandee of Spain
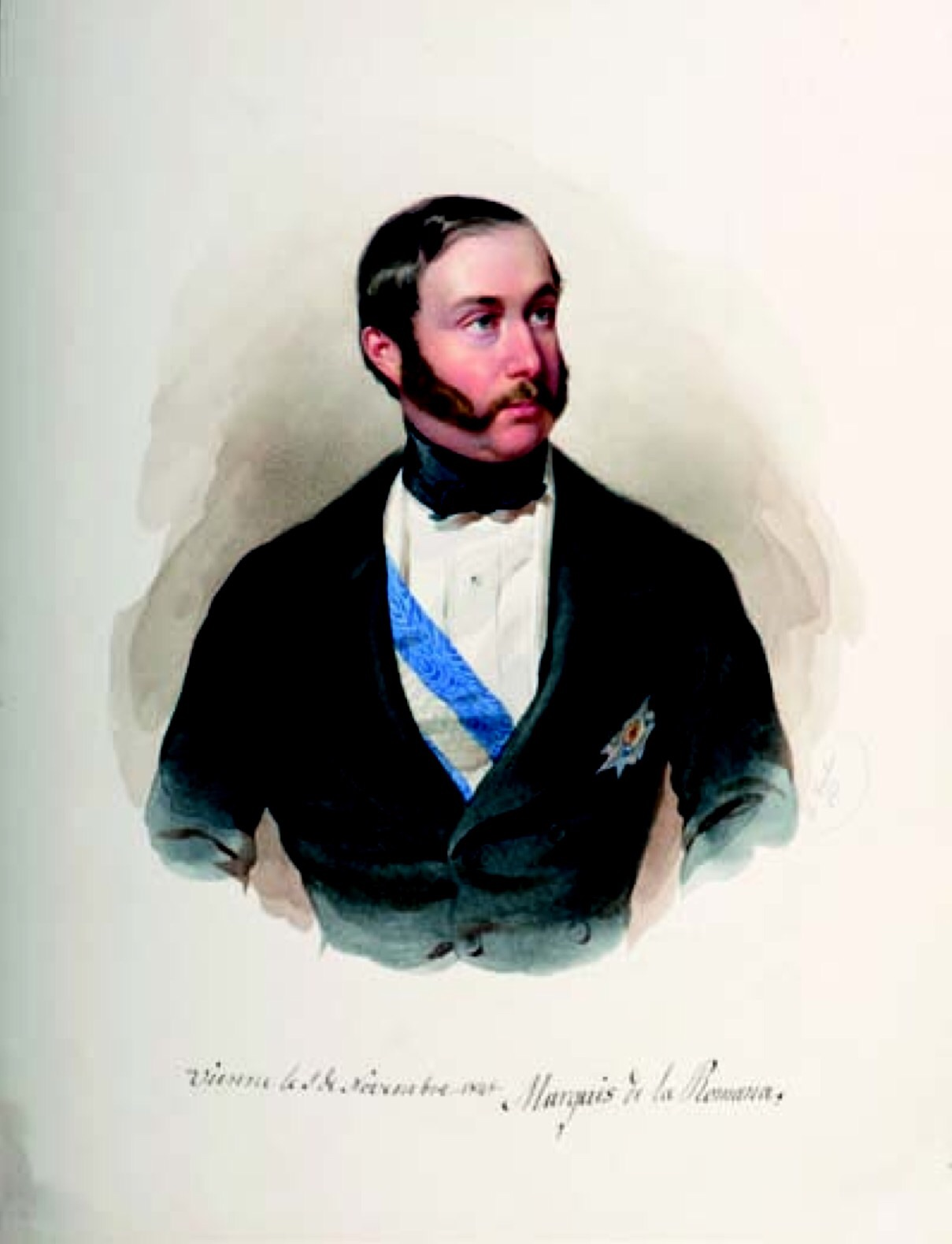
- Portrait of the Marquis, by Leopold Fischer, 1846
- Born: 20 June 1805; Palma de Mallorca, Spain
- Died: 8 December 1855 (aged 50); Valencia, Spain
- Spouse: María Tomasa Álvarez de Toledo y Palafox (m. 1826; died 1855)
- Parent(s): Pedro Caro y Sureda; Dionisia de Salas y Boixadors

Don Pedro Caro y Salas, 4th Marquis of La Romana, Grandee of Spain (20 June 1805 – 8 December 1855) was a Spanish aristocrat.

== Early life ==
He was the son of General Pedro Caro Sureda, 3rd Marquis of La Romana (1761–1811) and Dionisia de Salas y Boixadors. His sister, Margarita, married Joaquin Bou Crespi de Valldaura y Carvajal, 13th Count of Orgaz, in 1821.

His paternal uncles, José Caro Sureda, and Juan Caro Sureda also served in the Spanish army during the Peninsular War. His paternal grandparents were Pedro Caro y Fontes, 2nd Marquis of La Romana, and Margarita Sureda-Valero y Togores.

In 1811, at the age of five, he was orphaned by his father, inheriting his titles, among which was that of Marquis of La Romana, with a second-class Grandee of Spain. In 1817, King Ferdinand VII elevated this Grandee to a First-Class Grandee. On 28 January 1826, he was crowned a Grandee of Spain at the Royal Palace of Madrid, before Ferdinand VII.

== Career ==
After the death of Ferdinand VII and the promulgation of the Royal Statute of 1834, he was named a Peer of the House of Peers, the upper house in the Spanish Cortes between 1834 and 1836. Caro, however, did not take the oath of office as he supported the Carlist pretender to the Spanish throne, Infante Carlos María Isidro, which led to his exile along with other members of the high nobility of the time. In the mid-1830s he settled with his family in Vienna, where his brother-in-law Pedro de Alcántara Álvarez de Toledo, 13th Marquess of Villafranca, already lived.

He was awarded the Grand Cross of the Order of Charles III and made a Knight of the Real Maestranza de Caballería de Valencia.

== Personal life ==
On 21 August 1826 in Naples, Caro married Maria del Rosario Tomasa Álvarez de Toledo y Palafox, Duchess of Montalto (1805–1870), the daughter of Francisco de Borja Álvarez de Toledo, 12th Marquis of Villafranca (and 16th Duke of Medina Sidonia) and María Tomasa Palafox y Portocarrero (daughter of Felipe Antonio de Palafox Croy and María Francisca de Sales Portocarrero de Guzmán y Zúñiga, 6th Countess of Montijo and Grandee of Spain). Her brother was Pedro de Alcántara Álvarez de Toledo, 13th Marquess of Villafranca. Together, they were the parents of:

- Pedro Caro y Álvarez de Toledo, 5th Marquis of La Romana (1827–1888), who married Countess Erzsebet "Elisabeth" Széchényi de Sarvar et Felsövidek, a daughter of Count Pál Széchényi (a son of Count Ferenc Széchényi), and the former Emilie Zichy-Ferraris.
- Rosalía Caro y Álvarez de Toledo (1828–1903), who married her cousin, José Álvarez de Toledo y Silva, 18th Duke of Medina Sidonia.
- Joaquín Caro y Álvarez de Toledo, Count of Peña Ramiro (1829–1911), who served as the Civil Governor of Madrid and as a member of the Congress of Deputies; he married María Manuela del Arroyo y Moret.
- Carlos Caro y Álvarez de Toledo, Count of Caltavuturo (1835–1873), who married María de la Encarnación Caro y Gumucio, a daughter of Buenaventura Caro y Caro.

The Marquis died on 8 December 1855 and was succeeded in the marquisate by his eldest son, Pedro.

=== Descendants ===
Through his eldest son, he was a grandfather of Pedro Caro y Széchényi, 6th Marquis of La Romana (1849–1916), and José Caro y Széchényi (1854–1936), who served as Spain's ambassador to Japan.

Through his daughter Rosalía, he was a grandfather of José Joaquín Álvarez de Toledo, 19th Duke of Medina Sidonia (1865–1915).

Through his youngest son Carlos, he was a grandfather of María del Carmen Caro y Caro (1856–1907), who married Carlos Ruspoli, 3rd Duke of Alcudia and Sueca (son of Adolfo Ruspoli, 2nd Duke of Alcudia, and Rosalia Álvarez de Toledo y Silva-Bazán).

Spanish nobility
Preceded by Pedro Caro y Sureda	Marquis of La Romana; 1811–1855	Succeeded by Pedro Caro y Álvarez de Toledo
