= Pedro Caro, 5th Marquis of La Romana =

Spanish politician

The Most Excellent The Marquis of La Romana Grandee of Spain
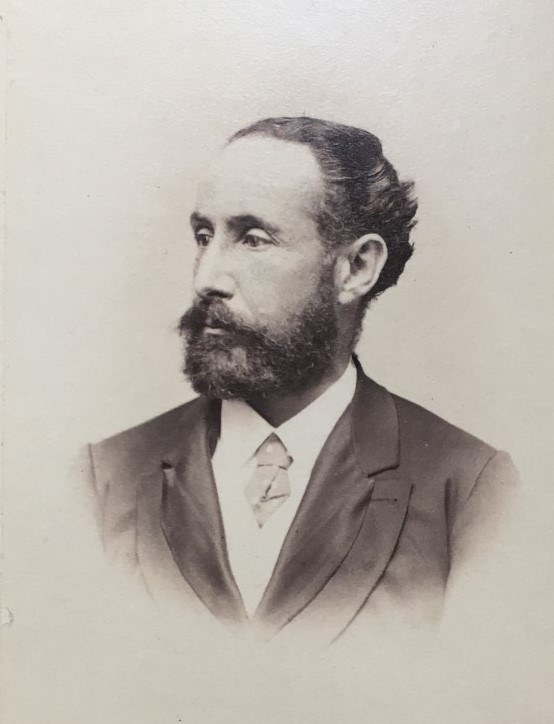
- Photograph of the Marquis taken in Vevey, by Francis de Jongh, 1870
- Born: 9 July 1827; Palma de Mallorca, Spain
- Died: 25 April 1888 (aged 60); Madrid, Spain
- Spouse: Erzsebet Széchényi (m. 1848; died 1888)
- Children: 6
- Parent(s): Pedro Caro y Salas; María Tomasa Álvarez de Toledo y Palafox

Don Pedro Caro y Álvarez de Toledo, 5th Marquis of La Romana, Grandee of Spain (9 July 1827 – 25 April 1888) was a Spanish aristocrat and politician.

== Early life ==
Caro was born on 9 July 1827 at Palma de Mallorca. He was the son of Pedro Caro y Salas, 4th Marquis of La Romana, and Maria del Rosario Tomasa Álvarez de Toledo y Palafox, Duchess of Montalto. His younger brother, Joaquín Caro y Álvarez de Toledo, served as the Civil Governor of Madrid and as a member of the Congress of Deputies, he married María Manuela del Arroyo y Moret. His sister, Rosalía Caro y Álvarez de Toledo, married their cousin, José Álvarez de Toledo y Silva, 18th Duke of Medina Sidonia.

His paternal grandparents were Pedro Caro Sureda, 3rd Marquis of La Romana and Dionisia de Salas y Boixadors. His maternal grandparents were Francisco de Borja Álvarez de Toledo, 12th Marquis of Villafranca (and 16th Duke of Medina Sidonia) and María Tomasa Palafox y Portocarrero (daughter of Felipe Antonio de Palafox Croy and María Francisca de Sales Portocarrero de Guzmán y Zúñiga, 6th Countess of Montijo and Grandee of Spain). His maternal uncle was Pedro de Alcántara Álvarez de Toledo, 13th Marquess of Villafranca.

== Career ==
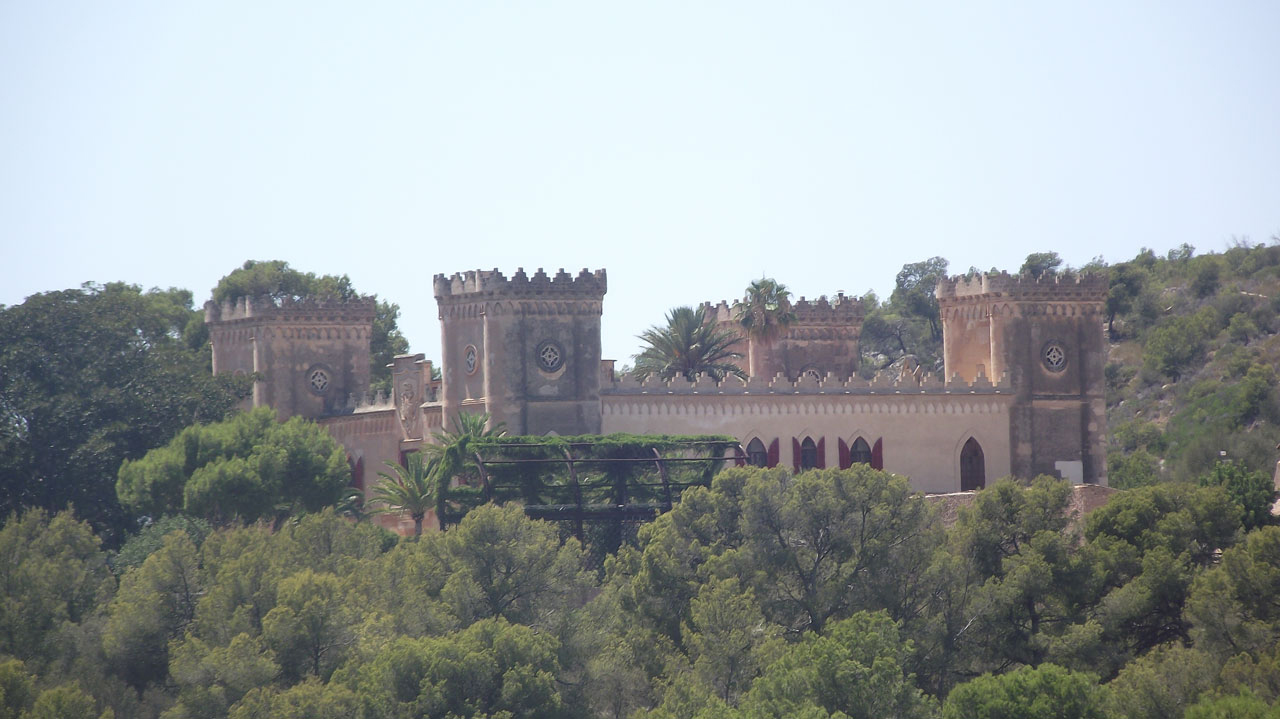
Caro's Castle of Bendinat in Mallorca

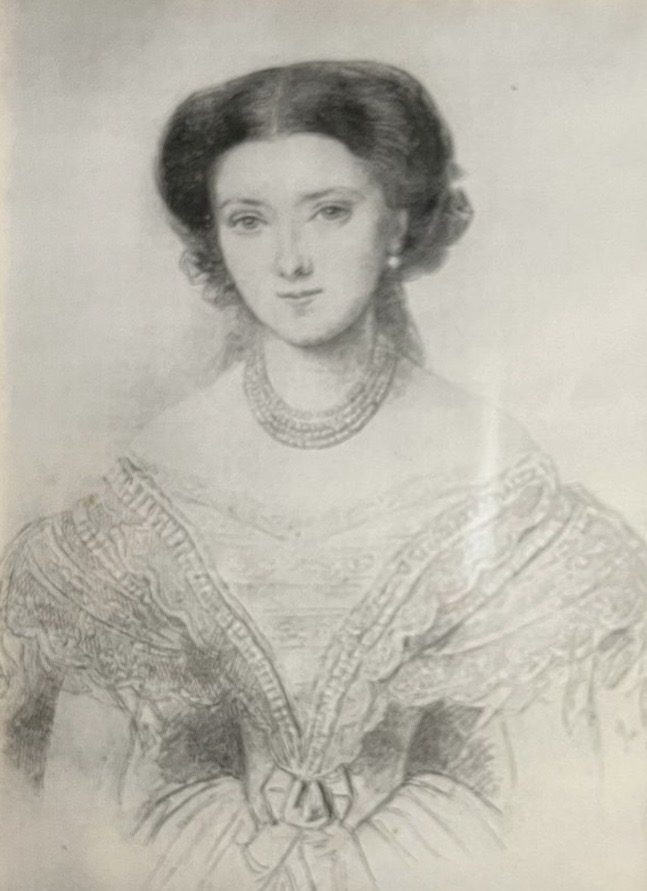
Drawing of his wife, Countess Erzsebet Széchényi c. 1847

Due to the Carlist loyalty of his father and his maternal uncle, Pedro de Alcántara Álvarez de Toledo, 13th Marquess of Villafranca, from mid-1830 they settled in Vienna. During his father's lifetime, he used the title of Viscount (or Count) of Benaesa. After returning from exile to Spain, he settled with his wife in Palma de Mallorca, where his first child was born in 1849. On the island of Mallorca, the couple owned the Castle of Bendinat (Spanish: Castell de Bendinat). In 1872, he bought the Palacio del Príncipe de Anglona in Madrid.

Following the death of his father on 8 December 1855, he succeeded as the 5th Marquis of La Romana, although he would continue to use the title of Viscount of Benaesa. In 1860, he was arrested for his participation in the Carlist plot of the Carlist landing of San Carlos de la Rápita led by the Pretender Carlos Luis de Borbón. As part of his Carlist militancy, he was on the council of the pretender Carlos VII, and Chief Steward of Margherita of Bourbon-Parma, the pretender's wife. During the Third Carlist War, he accompanied Margherita of Bourbon-Parma along with other Carlist nobles such as Tirso de Olazábal.

He was made a Knight of the Real Maestranza de Caballería de Valencia.

== Personal life ==
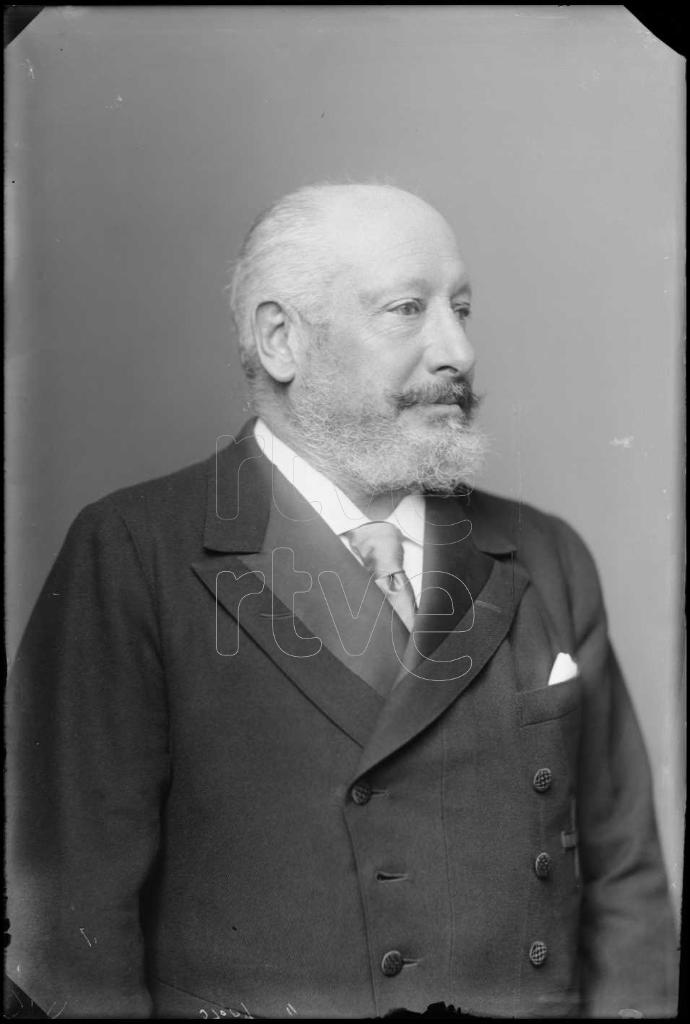
Photograph of his eldest son, Pedro, c. 1914

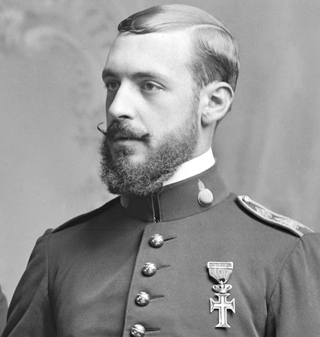
Photograph of his second son, José, at Queen Victoria's Diamond Jubilee, 24 June 1897

On 8 May 1848 in Sopron, Caro married Countess Erzsébet "Elisabeth" Széchényi de Sárvár et Felsővidék (1827–1910), a daughter of Count Pál Széchényi (a son of Count Ferenc Széchényi), and the former Emilie Zichy-Ferraris. Her father had previously been married to, and widowed from, Lady Caroline Meade (a daughter of the 2nd Earl of Clanwilliam). Countess Elisabeth was the sister of Count Pál Széchenyi, the Minister of Agriculture, Industry and Trade of Hungary from October 1882 to April 1889. Together, they were the parents of:

- Pedro Caro y Széchényi, 6th Marquis of La Romana (1849–1916), who married María de la Piedad Martinez de Irujo y del Alcazar, the daughter of Gabriela del Alcázar, 7th Duchess of Sotomayor, and Prime Minister Carlos Martínez de Irujo, 2nd Marquess of Casa Irujo.
- María de la Asunción Caro y Széchényi (1853–1897), who married Carlos Martínez de Irujo, 8th Duke of Sotomayor, brother to María de la Piedad Martinez de Irujo y del Alcazar, in 1876. After her death in 1897, he married her sister, María del Pilar Caro y Széchényi.
- José Caro y Széchényi (1854–1936), styled Count of Peña Ramiro, a diplomat who served as Spain's ambassador to Japan.
- Alvaro Caro y Széchenyi (1856–1923), who married Isabel Guillamas y Piñeyro, 8th Marchioness of Villamayor and Countess of Torrubia
- María del Pilar Caro y Széchényi (1864–1931), who married José María Guillamas y Piñeiro, the Marquess of San Felices. After his death, she married Carlos Martínez de Irujo, 8th Duke of Sotomayor. After his death, she married the 12th Marquess of Martorell in 1922.
- Joaquina Caro y Széchenyi (1867–1961), who married Francisco de Paula Fernández del Valle y Martínez Negrete, 1st Marquess del Valle.

The Marquis died in at his palace in Madrid on 25 April 1888 and was succeeded in the marquisate by his eldest son, Pedro.

Spanish nobility
Preceded by Pedro Caro y Salas	Marquis of La Romana; 1855–1888	Succeeded by Pedro Caro y Széchényi
