= Pál Széchenyi =

Pál Széchenyi may refer to:

- Pál Széchényi (bishop) (1645–1710), Archbishop of Kalocsa
- Pál Széchényi (1789–1871) (1789–1871) Imperial and Royal chamberlain
- Pál Széchenyi (politician) (1838–1901) politician, minister
- Pál Széchényi (chamberlain) (1853–1937), chamberlain
- Pál Széchényi (soldier) (1918–1944), soldier
