= Carlos Martínez de Irujo =

Carlos Martínez de Irujo may refer to:

- Carlos Martínez de Irujo, 1st Marquess of Casa Irujo (1763–1824), Spanish diplomat and prime minister
- Carlos Martínez de Irujo, 2nd Marquess of Casa Irujo (1802–1855), his son, Spanish politician and prime minister
