= Carlos Martínez de Irujo, 8th Duke of Sotomayor =

Spanish politician

The Most Excellent The Duke of Sotomayor GE
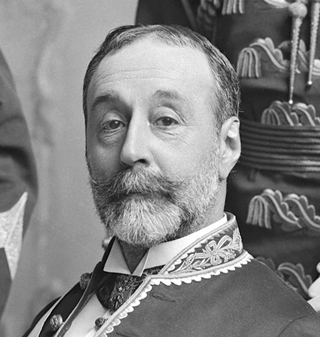
- Don Carlos at Queen Victoria's Diamond Jubilee, 24 June 1897
- Born: Carlos Manuel Mariano Martínez de Irujo y del Alcázar; 3 April 1846; London, England
- Died: 14 September 1909 (aged 63); San Sebastián, Spain
- Spouse(s): María de la Asunción Caro y Széchényi (m. 1875; died 1897) María del Pilar Caro y Széchényi (m. 1899, died)
- Children: 14, including Pedro
- Parent(s): Gabriela del Alcázar; Carlos Martínez de Irujo
- Awards: Knight of the Order of the Golden Fleece

Don Carlos Manuel Mariano Martínez de Irujo y del Alcázar, 8th Duke of Sotomayor, 3rd Marquis of Casa Irujo, GE (3 April 1846 – 14 September 1909) was a Spanish noble and politician who was an influential figure of the Restoration and of the regency of Queen María Cristina.

== Early life ==
Martínez de Irujo was born on 3 April 1846. He was the only son of Gabriela del Alcázar, 7th Duchess of Sotomayor, and Carlos Martínez de Irujo, 2nd Marquis of Casa Irujo, who served as Prime Minister of Spain under Isabella II from January to March 1847. His sister, María de la Piedad Martínez de Irujo y del Alcázar, married Pedro Caro y Széchényi, 6th Marquis of La Romana.

His maternal grandparents were Juan Gualberto del Alcázar y Zúñiga, 6th Marquis del Valle de la Paloma, and Victoria María Teresa de Vera Aragón y Nin de Zatrillas, 2nd Duchess de la Roca. His paternal grandparents were the diplomat Carlos Martínez de Irujo y Erice, 1st Marquis of Casa Irujo, and his American wife Sarah McKean (the daughter of the Pennsylvania Governor and signer of the Declaration of Independence, Thomas McKean).

He studied law and became a diplomat.

== Career ==
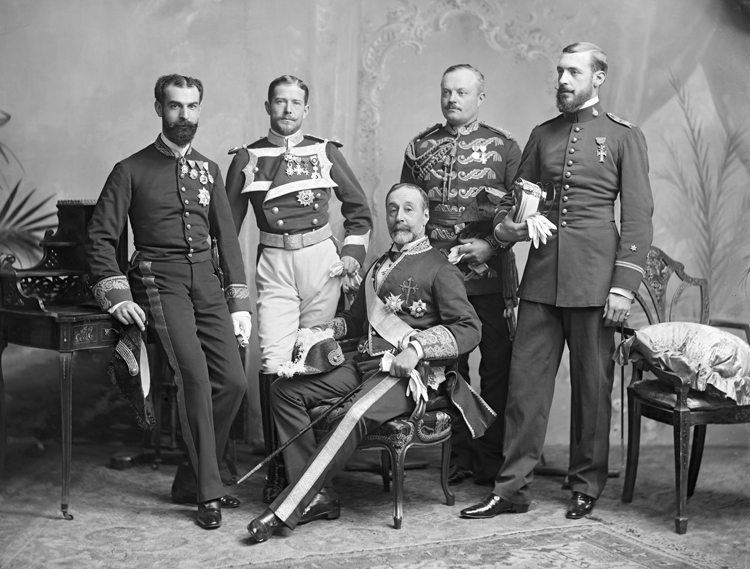
The Duke of Sotomayor, seated, at Queen Victoria's Diamond Jubilee, 24 June 1897

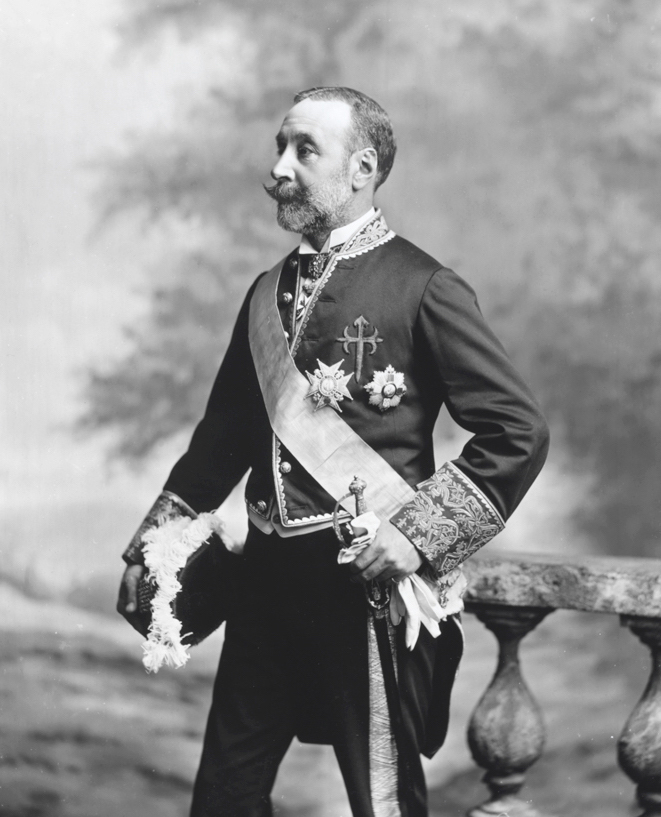
The Duke of Sotomayor, 1897

In 1850, he became the 3rd Marquis of Los Arcos following the death of his father's younger brother. Upon his father's death on 26 December 1855 in Madrid, he became the 3rd Marquis of Casa Irujo. Upon his mother's death on 2 June 1889, he became the 8th Duke of Sotomayor. On 24 December 1890, King Alfonso XIII of Spain granted the accompanying dignity of Grandee to Don Carlos as third marquis.

In June 1897, the Duke served as Special Ambassador appointed by the Queen-Regent of Spain for Queen Victoria's Diamond Jubilee, attending the State Evening Party at Buckingham Palace on 24 June 1897.

He held various positions, including a member of the Congress of Deputies in 1876 and 1879 for the district of Ciudad Rodrigo with the ultramontane faction, and a Senator for the Logroño province in 1884 and, in his own right, since 1880. In 1902, he was made a Knight of the Order of the Golden Fleece. He was also a Knight of the Order of Santiago and of the Maestranza de Zaragoza, Grand Cross of the Order of Charles III. In June of the same year, the Duke received the Honorary Knight Grand Cross of the Royal Victorian Order (GCVO) from the Duke of Connaught, on the occasion of the enthronement of Alfonso XIII. He was also a Major Commander of León, Gentlemen of the Bedchamber Grandee of Spain and member of the Permanent Deputation of the Grandeeship of Spain. He was Sumiller de Corps from 1906 to 1909, Guardasellos de Su Majestad el Rey (Seal Keeper of His Majesty the King), Jefe Superior de Palacio (High Chief of the Palace), and Mayordomo mayor (High Steward) of the Queen from 1890 to 1906 (while she was Queen regent of Spain during the infancy of her son, Alfonso XIII).

== Personal life ==
On 28 May 1875 in Madrid, he married María de la Asunción Caro y Széchényi (1853–1897), a daughter of Pedro Caro y Álvarez de Toledo, 5th Marquis of La Romana, and Countess Erzsebet "Elisabeth" Széchényi (a granddaughter of Count Ferenc Széchényi). Her brother, Pedro Caro y Széchényi, 6th Marquis of La Romana, married Don Carlos' sister, María de la Piedad. Before her death on 7 September 1897, they were the parents of eleven children, four of whom died at an early age, including:

- Carlos Martínez de Irujo y Caro (1877–1906), who became the 4th Marquis of Casa Irujo in 1904, but predeceased his father in 1906.
- Asunción Isabel Martinez de Irujo y Caro (1879–1964), who married Cristóbal García-Loygorri, 3rd Duke of Vistahermosa, son of Narciso García-Loygorri, 2nd Duke of Vistahermosa.
- María de la Piedad Martinez de Irujo y Caro (1880–1954)
- María del Rosario Martinez de Irujo y Caro (1881–1951), who married Manuel de Mendívil y Elío, the Governor of Spanish Guinea in 1937.
- Pedro Martinez de Irujo y Caro, 9th Duke of Sotomayor (1882–1957), who married Ana María de Artázcoz y Labayen, a daughter of Francisco Javier Artázcoz y Urdinola.
- Juan Guaberto Martinez de Irujo y Caro (1883–1892), who died young.
- Luis Martinez de Irujo y Caro (1886–1962), who married Guadalupe Aspe y Suinaga.
- Teresa Martinez de Irujo y Caro (1888–1892), who died young.
- Gabriela Martinez de Irujo y Caro (1890–1892), who died young.
- Cristina Martinez de Irujo y Caro (1892–1986), who married Emilio Aznar y de la Puente, 2nd Marquis of Zuya.
- Fernanda Martinez de Irujo y Caro (1895–1901), who died young.

On 11 March 1899, he married María del Pilar Caro y Széchényi (1864–1931), younger sister of his first wife and widow of the Marquis of San Felices, José María Guillamas y Piñeiro, Grandee of Spain, who died in 1895. Together, they were the parents of three children, including:

- María del Carmen Martínez de Irujo y Caro (b. 1899), who married Alejandro Pidal y Guilhou, son of Pedro Pidal, 1st Marquis of Villaviciosa de Asturias.
- Carlota Martínez de Irujo y Caro (1904–1945), who married Gonzalo Taboada y Sangro, a son of Carlos Taboada y Bugallo and María Victoria Sangro y Ros de Olano, 3rd Countess of Almina.

The Duke died on 14 September 1909 at San Sebastián. After his death, his widow, María del Pilar, remarried for the third time to the 12th Marquis of Martorell on 24 March 1922.

== Honors ==
- 1902: Knight Grand Cross of the Royal Victorian Order.
- 1902: Knight of the Order of the Golden Fleece.
- Knight of the Order of Santiago.
- Grand Cross of the Order of Charles III.

Spanish nobility
Preceded by Carlos Martínez de Irujo	Marquis of Casa Irujo; 1855–1909	Succeeded by Pedro Martínez de Irujo
Preceded by Gabriela del Alcázar y Vera de Aragón	Duke of Sotomayor; 1889–1909	Succeeded by Pedro Martínez de Irujo
