= Marquis of Martorell =

Title in the Peerage of Spain

- Coat of arms of the Marquess of Martorell
- Creation date: 1627
- Created by: Philip IV of Spain
- First holder: Luis Francisco Fajardo de Zúñiga y Requesens
- Present holder: Alonso Álvarez de Toledo y Merry del Val

The Marquis of Martorell (Spanish: Marqués de Martorell) is a title of Spanish nobility that was created in 1627 by King Philip IV in favor of Luis Francisco Fajardo de Zúñiga y Requesens.

== History ==
Luis Francisco Fajardo de Zúñiga y Requesens was a grandson of Luis Fajardo y Requeséns, 3rd Marquis of Molina, of the House of Vélez and Lord of the Barony of Martorell, by incorporation of the House of Requeséns de Soler. Its name refers to the Catalan municipality of Martorell, in the Province of Barcelona.

== List of title holders ==
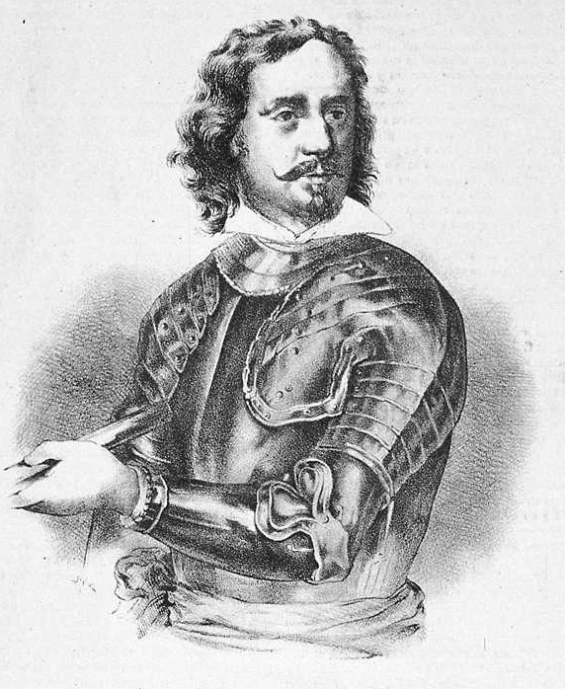
Pedro Fajardo de Zúñiga y Requesens, 2nd Marquis of Martorell

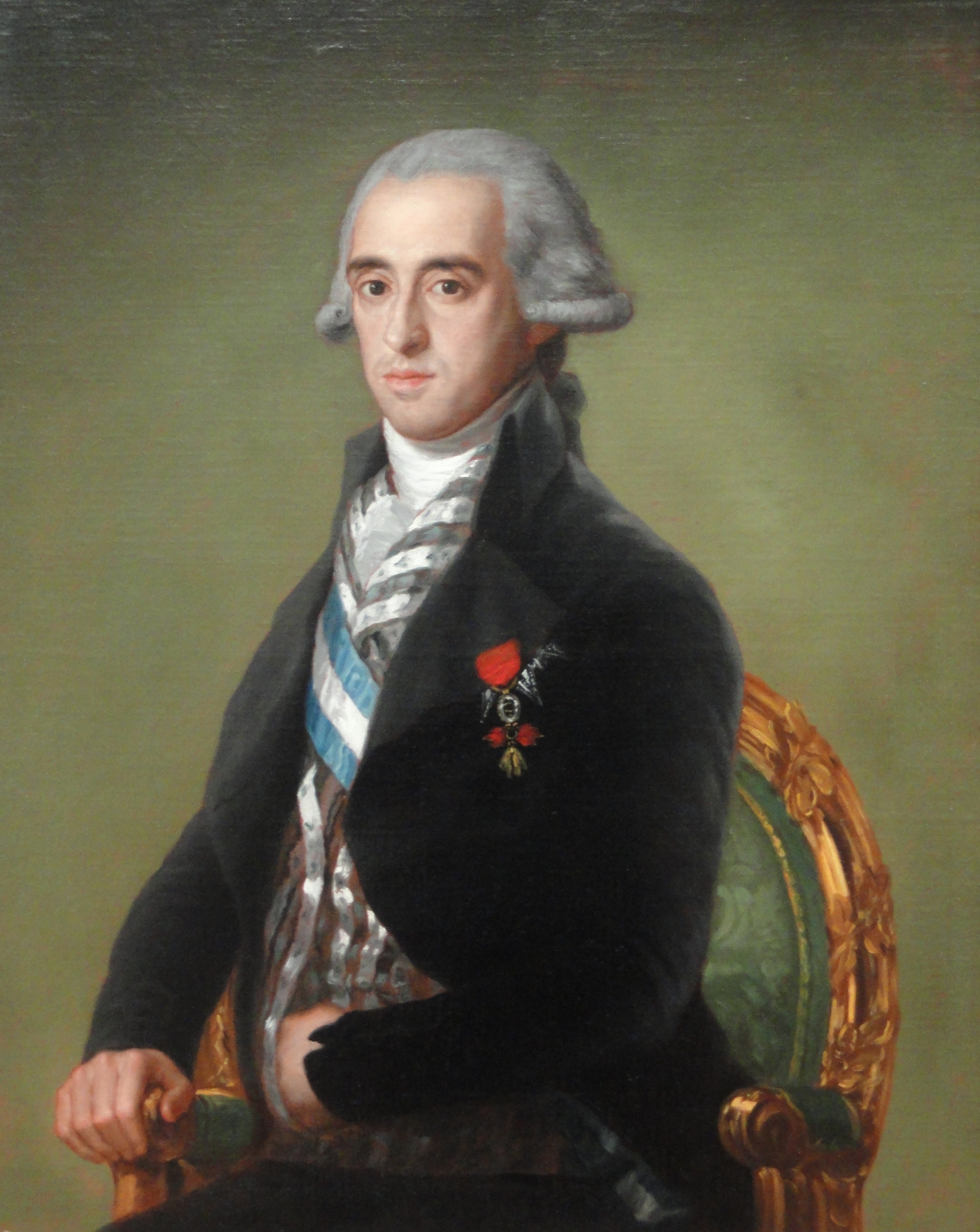
José Álvarez de Toledo y Gonzaga, the 8th Marquis of Martorell, by Francisco de Goya, 1795

	Holder of Title	Period	Notes
Lords of the Barony of Martorell
1	Luis de Requesens y Soler	c. 1471–1509	(Note: In 1471, John II of Aragon sold Martorell to Luis de Requesens y Soler, son of Galceran de Requesens y Santa Coloma and governor of Catalonia, of the House of Requesens, as a reward for services rendered to the Crown of Aragon, especially during the Catalan Civil War. This monarch also issued a privilege authorizing the placement of the arms of Aragon on the coat of arms of the Requesens.)
2	Estefanía de Requesens y Liori	1509–1549	(Note: In 1518, Estefanía obtained confirmation from King Charles I of the possession of Martorell and other places in the barony. The confirmation was made to Hipólita de Liori y de Requesens, widow of Luis de Requesens, Count of Palamós, as guardian of her daughter Estefanía. At that time the barony was made up of Martorell, Molins de Rei, Castellví de Rosanes, Santa Cruz de Olorde, San Esteban Sasroviras, San Vicente de Castellbisbal and Nuestra Señora de la Victoria del Palau Requesens in Barcelona.)
3	Luis de Requesens y Zúñiga	1549–1576	
4	Mencía de Requesens y Estellrich	1576–1618	
5	Luis Francisco Fajardo de Zúñiga y Requesens	1618–1637	
Marquises of Martorell (created by King Philip IV of Spain)
1	Luis Francisco Fajardo de Zúñiga y Requesens	1627–1637	
2	Pedro Fajardo de Zúñiga y Requesens	1637–1647	
3	Fernando Joaquín Fajardo de Requeséns y Zúñiga	1647–1693	
4	María Teresa Fajardo de Requesens y Zúñiga	1693–1715	
5	Catalina Moncada de Aragón y Fajardo	1715–1727	
6	Fadrique Vicente Álvarez de Toledo Osorio	1727–1753	
7	Antonio Álvarez de Toledo Osorio	1753–1773	
8	José Álvarez de Toledo y Gonzaga	1773–1796	
9	Francisco de Borja Álvarez de Toledo y Gonzaga	1796–1821	
10	Pedro de Alcántara Álvarez de Toledo y Palafox	1821–1866	
11	Alonso Tomás Álvarez de Toledo y Silva	1866–1895	(Note: Alonso Tomás Álvarez de Toledo y Silva (1835–1895) was the second son of Pedro de Alcántara Álvarez de Toledo y Palafox, 13th Marquess of Villafranca. The eldest son of the 13th Marquess of Villafranca was José Joaquín Álvarez de Toledo, 18th Duke of Medina Sidonia and the third son of the 13th Marquess of Villafranca was Pedro Álvarez de Toledo y Silva, 9th Marquess of Valdueza.)
12	Pedro de Alcántara Álvarez de Toledo y Samaniego	1896–1925	(Note: Pedro de Alcántara Álvarez de Toledo y Samaniego (1867–1925) was the elder brother of Manuel Alvarez de Toledo y Samaniego, Marquess of Miraflores (second son of the 11th Marquess of Martorell), and Alonso Álvarez de Toledo y Samaniego, 10th Marquess of Valdueza (third son of the 11th Marquess of Martorell). The 12th Marquess of Martorell married, as her third husband, María del Pilar Caro y Széchényi, widow of both José María Guillamas y Piñeiro, Marquess of San Felices, and Carlos Martínez de Irujo, 8th Duke of Sotomayor. She was the daughter of Pedro Caro y Álvarez de Toledo, 5th Marquis of La Romana, and Countess Erzsebet "Elisabeth" Széchényi (a granddaughter of Count Ferenc Széchényi).)
13	Joaquín Álvarez de Toledo y Mencos	1926–1991	(Note: Joaquín Álvarez de Toledo y Mencos (1901–1991) was the nephew of the 12th Marquess of Martorell, being the second son of Manuel Alvarez de Toledo y Samaniego, Marquess of Miraflores. The 13th Marquess was the younger brother of Alonso Álvarez de Toledo y Mencos, 4th Duke of Zaragoza.)
14	Alonso Álvarez de Toledo y Merry del Val	1991–	
