= Duke of Sotomayor =

Title in the Peerage of Spain

Dukedom of Sotomayor
- Creation date: 25 April 1703
- Created by: Philip V of Spain
- First holder: Fernando Yáñez Álvarez de Sotomayor y Lima
- Present holder: Carlos Martínez de Irujo y Crespo

Duke of Sotomayor (Spanish: Duque de Sotomayor) is a title of Spanish nobility that was created, with Grandee of Spain, on 25 April 1703 by King Philip V in favor of Fernando Álvarez de Sotomayor y Lima, 2nd Marquess of Tenorio, 2nd Count of Crecente and Lord of Sotomayor.

== History ==
The name of the title refers to the Lordship of Sotomayor, a Galician municipality in the current Province of Pontevedra.

The Lordship and Castle of Sotomayor was in the possession of the Dukes until the end of the 18th century, when it was lost to Benito Fernández Correa y Sotomayor, 4th Marquess of Mos, who won the lawsuit for a better right that his father, Pelayo Antonio Correa Sotomayor, had initiated on 14 May 1773, on the lands of the Sotomayor estate.

== Dukes of Sotomayor ==
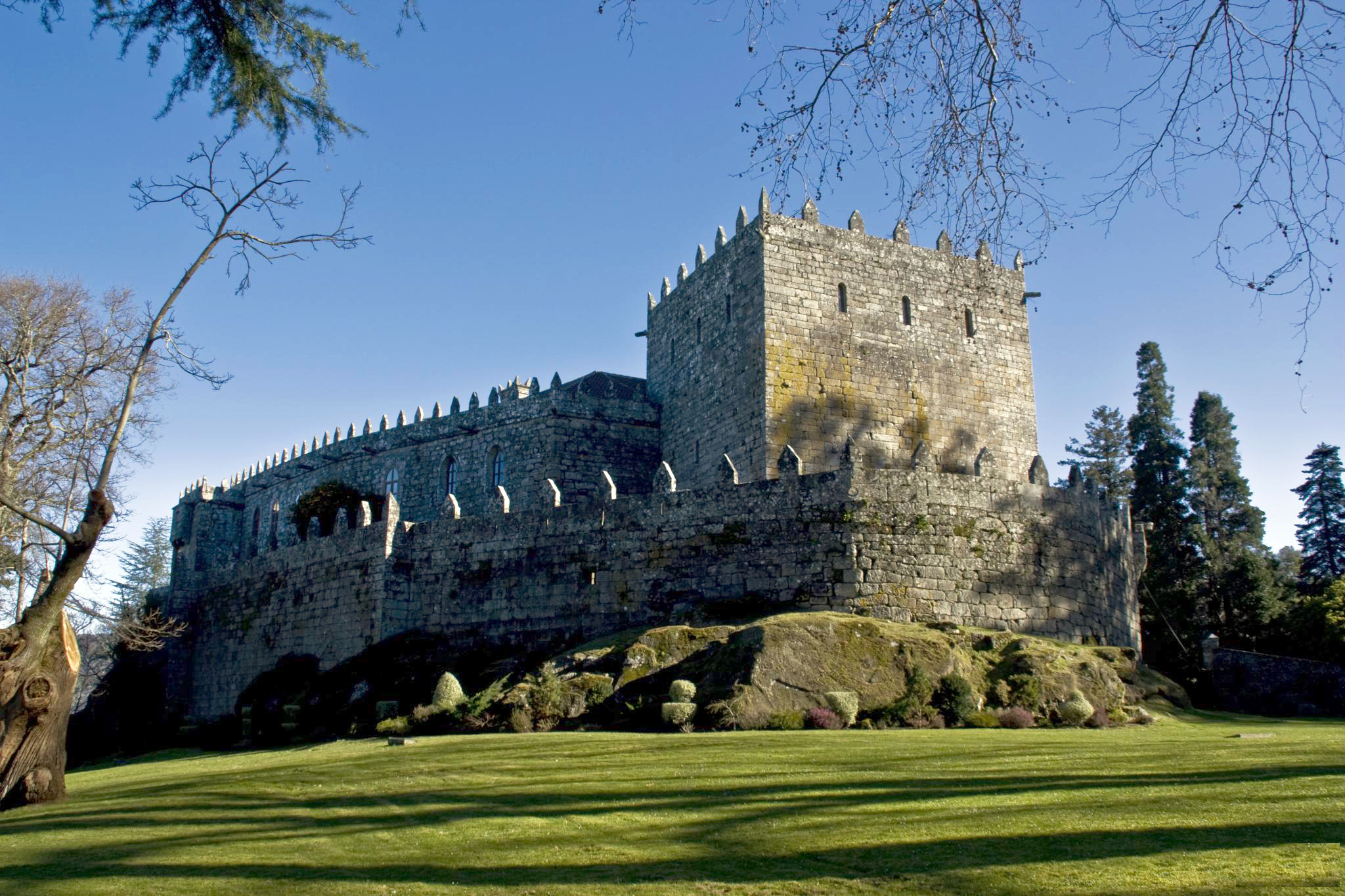
The Castle of Sotomayor, which was in the possession of the family until the 4th Duchess lost it in a lawsuit, after which it passed to the Marquesses of Mos

	Holder of Title	Period	Notes
Created by King Philip V of Spain
1	Fernando Yáñez Álvarez de Sotomayor y Lima	1703–1705	
2	María de Sotomayor y Lima	1705–1726	
3	Félix Fernando Sotomayor Masones de Lima	1726–1767	
4	Ana María de Masones de Sotomayor y Lima	1767–1789	
5	Ignacio Jaime de Sotomayor Margens de Nin y Zatrillas	1798–1835	
6	Mariana Nin y Zatrillas y Sotomayor	1835–1844	
7	Gabriela del Alcázar y Vera de Aragón	1844–1889	Married to the 2nd Marquess of Casa Irujo
8	Carlos Martínez de Irujo y del Alcázar	1889–1909	
9	Pedro Martínez de Irujo y Caro	1910–1957	
10	Ignacio Martínez de Irujo y Artázcoz	1959–2011	
11	Carlos Martínez de Irujo y Crespo	2012–	

== See also ==
- List of dukes in the peerage of Spain
