= Marquess of Mos =

Marquessate of Mos
- Marquess crown
- Creation: 1 December 1692
- Created by: Charles II of Spain
- First holder: Gabriel Sarmiento Quirós de Sotomayor
- Present holder: Rafael Pérez-Blanco y Pernas
- Remainder to: Heirs of the body of the grantee
- Status: Extant

Marquess of Mos (Spanish: Marqués de Mos) is a hereditary title of Spanish nobility. It was created on 1 December 1692 by King Charles II of Spain in favor of Gabriel Sarmiento Quiros de Sotomayor.

== History ==
On 12 November 1789, King Charles IV of Spain granted the accompanying dignity of Grandee to the fourth marquis, Benito Correa y Sotomayor.

== Marquesses of Mos (1692) ==
	Holder of Title	Period	Notes
Created by King Charles II Spain
1	Gabriel Sarmiento Quirós de Sotomayor	1692–1706	
2	Catalina Josefa Sarmiento de Quirós	1706–?	
3	Pelayo Antonio Correa de Sotomayor	?–1778	
4	Benito Fernando Correa y Sotomayor	1778–1816	
5	Alonso Correa de Sotomayor Pinto de Sousa	1816–1868	
6	Antonio Aguilar Correa y Fernández de Córdoba	1869–1907	
7	Fernando de Quiñones de León y Elduayen	1910–1918	
8	María Dolores Elduayen y Martínez	1919–1929	
9	Joaquina Pérez de Castro y Martínez Britto	1930–1942	
10	Mariano Pérez y Pérez de Castro	1954–1974	
11	Rafael Pérez Blanco	1976	
12	Rafael Pérez-Blanco y Pernas	1980–	

== See also ==
- Marquess of la Vega de Armijo
- Duke of Sotomayor
