= Pál Széchenyi (politician) =

Hungarian politician (1838–1901)

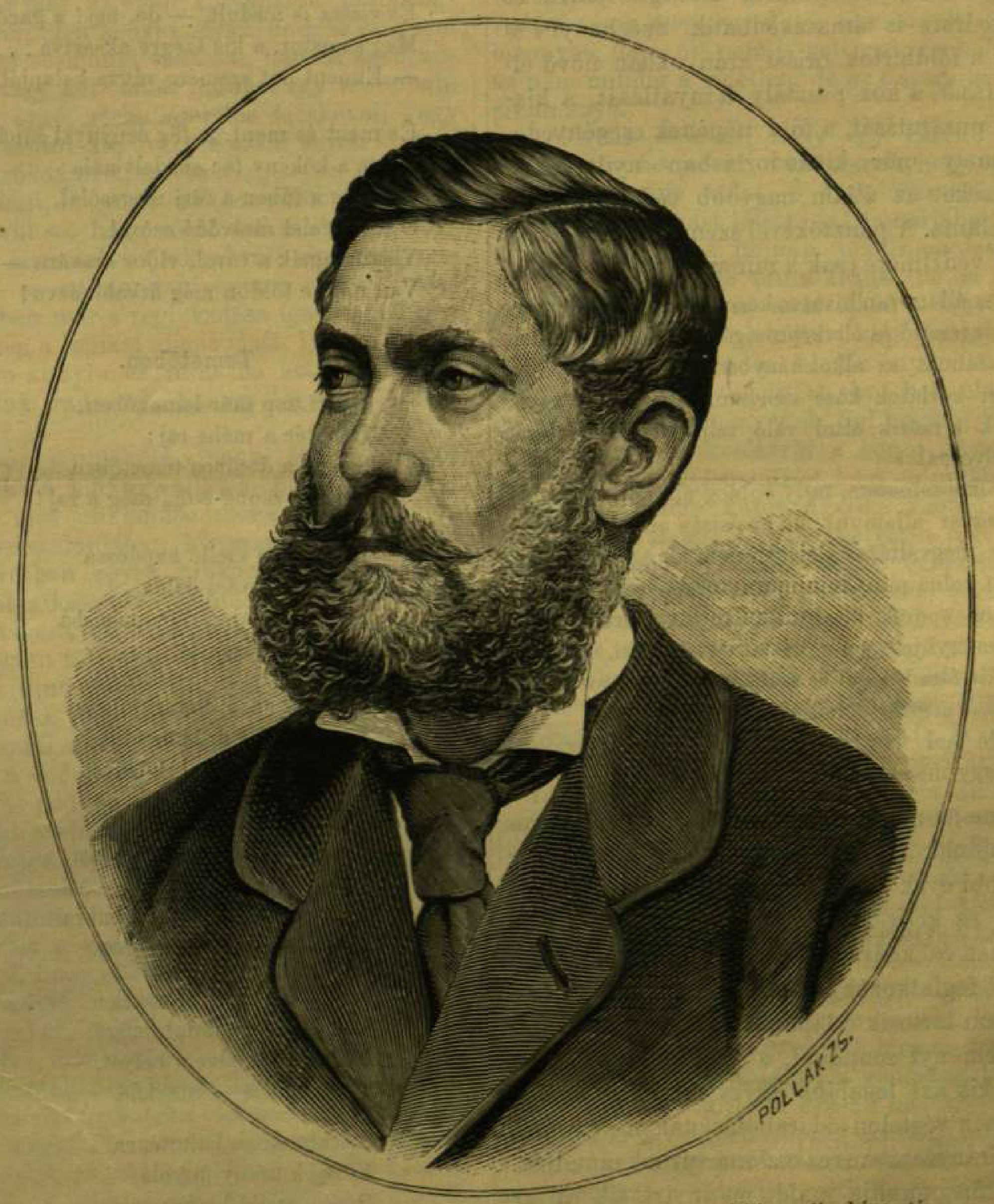

Minister of Agriculture, Industry and Trade of Hungary
- In office 12 October 1882 – 8 April 1889
- Preceded by: Gábor Kemény
- Succeeded by: Gyula Szapáry

Personal details
- Born: Pál Kelemen Ferenc de Paula Mária; 6 November 1838 Sopron, Kingdom of Hungary
- Died: 28 October 1901 (aged 62) Budapest, Austria-Hungary
- Party: Liberal Party
- Spouse: Countess Erzsébet Andrássy de Csíkszentkirály et Krasznahorka
- Children: Aladár Pál György Julián Mária; Mária Franciska Georgina; Emil József Károly Mária
- Profession: Politician

Count Pál Széchenyi de Sárvár-Felsővidék (6 November 1838 – 28 October 1901) was a Hungarian politician, who served as Minister of Agriculture, Industry and Trade between 1882 and 1889.

== Early life ==
Count Pál Széchenyi was the son of Imperial and Royal Lieutenant Colonel Pál Széchényi (1789–1871) and Countess Emilia Zichy-Ferraris. His sister, Elise Széchényi, married Pedro Caro, 5th Marquis of La Romana. His paternal grandparents were Count Ferenc Széchényi and Countess Julia Festetics de Tolna.

He completed his schooling in Nagyszombat and initially trained as a priest; but he left the priesthood there, left the seminary in Szombathely and moved to his estate in Somogy and began studying economics.

== Career ==
He took an active part in the economic movements of Somogy County, and thus organized the economic circle in Nagyatád. In 1876, he was elected vice-president of the National Hungarian Economic Association (Hungarian: Országos Magyar Gazdasági Egyesület or OMGE). In 1875, the Marcal district of Somogy County elected him as a member of National Assembly and he supported the moderate opposition. At that time, there was no economic issue in or outside the House that Széchenyi would not have addressed. He played a leading role at the economic congress held on the occasion of the Székesfehérvár exhibition and also played a major role in the survey of the national economic association. In 1882 he joined the Liberal Party and was appointed Minister of Agriculture, Industry and Trade that same year. In this capacity he organized the 1885 exhibition; for these merits he received the Order of the Iron Crown, First Class, after the King had already made him a member of the Privy Council (Hungarian: Geheimrat) in 1883. Széchenyi resigned from his ministry on 9 April 1889. He made few appearances thereafter and was absent from the House.

His articles were published in the Economic Journal (1865; A few words for the promotion of the rural economy of our country); in the Hunting and Competition Journal (Hungarian: Vadász és Versenylap) (1871, 1874); and in the National Economic Review (1879; The fiftieth anniversary of the national Hungarian economic association).

== Personal life ==
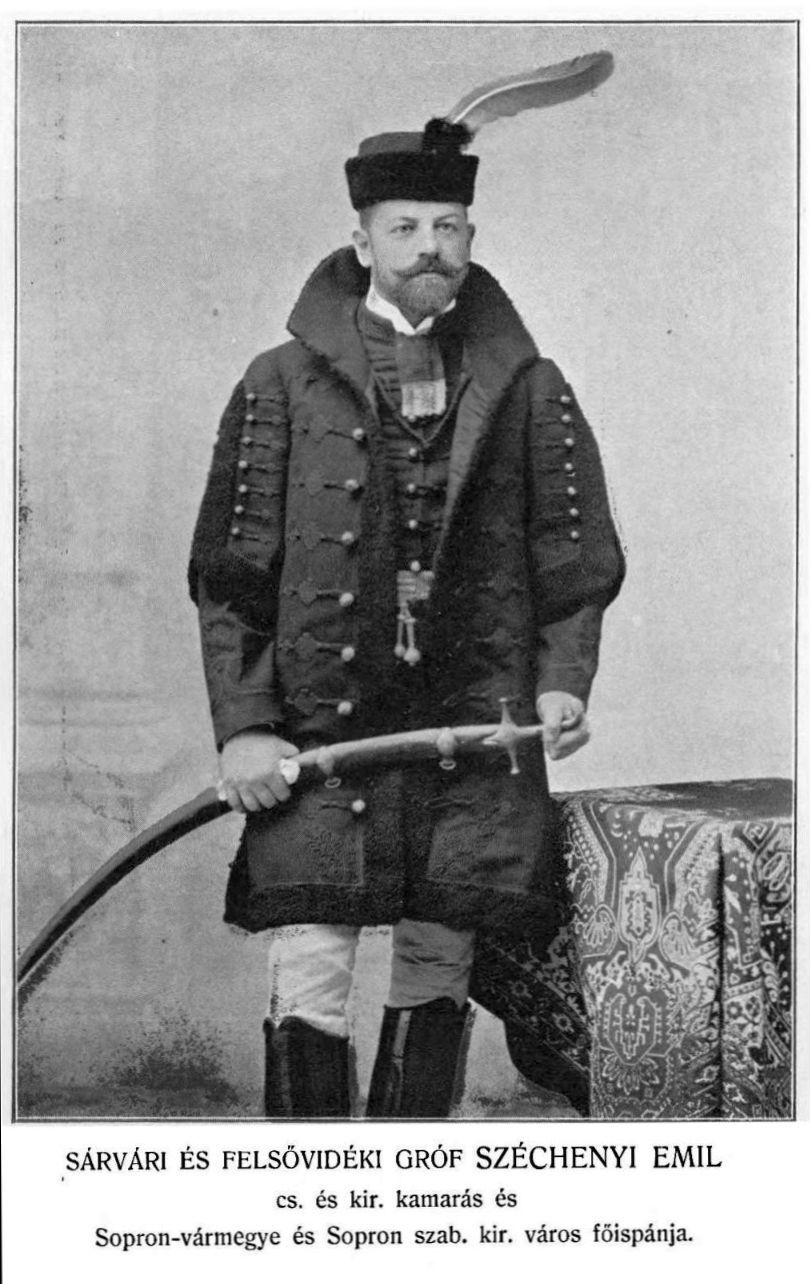
His younger son, Emil, 1902

Széchenyi was married to Countess Erzsébet "Elisabeth" Andrássy de Csíkszentkirály et Krasznahorka (1840–1926), a daughter of Count György Andrássy de Csíkszentkirály and Countess Franziska zu Königsegg-Aulendorf. Among her siblings was brother Count Dénes Andrássy. Together, they were the parents of:

- Aladár Pál György Julián Mária Széchenyi (1862–1936), who married Countess Natalia Leontina Mária Andrássy de Csíkszentkirály, a daughter of Count Emanuel Manó Andrássy. They divorced and she married his cousin, Count Bertalan Széchényi. Aladár married Flora Eleonóra Viszay, a daughter of Sandor Viszay.
- Maria Franciska Georgina Széchenyi (1863–1932), who married Count József Mailáth de Székhely, a son of Count György Majláth de Székhely, and Baroness Stephanie Hilleprand von Prandau.
- Emil Joseph Karl Maria Széchenyi (1865–1932), who married Countess Mária Hunyady de Kéthely, a daughter of Count Imre Hunyady de Kéthely and Countess Felicia Kristina Győry de Radvány.

Széchenyi died in Budapest on 28 October 1901.

Political offices
Preceded by Gábor Kemény	Minister of Agriculture, Industry and Trade; 1882–1889	Succeeded by Gyula Szapáry
