= Diego del Alcázar, 10th Marquis of la Romana =

Grandee of Spain

Diego del Alcázar

Diego del Alcázar Silvela (born 30 August 1950 in Avila, Spain) is Grandee of Spain and the 10th Marquess of la Romana (direct descendant of Pedro Caro y Sureda, 3rd Marquis of la Romana). Del Alcázar studied law, political sciences and business administration in the Complutense University of Madrid and the Sorbonne, Paris.

He is married to María Benjumea Cabeza de Vaca, entrepreneur and president of Infoempleo.

== Entrepreneurship and business ==
As an independent entrepreneur Diego del Alcázar has been involved in the start-up of numerous businesses in Spain, including Aguas de Mondariz, Balneario de Mondariz, Publicidad Gisbert, Group Gaceta and Thomil. He was the founder of IE Business School with the collaboration of a group of entrepreneurs in 1974, and became the driving force behind the school. Today he is the President of IE Business School and President of IE Foundation. He is also a trustee of Madrid’s Complutense University. Until 2009, he was also a Member of the Board of Directors at ONO Cable Networks. On 24 September 2007, he was appointed Chairman of the biggest media conglomerate of Spain, Vocento (Grupo Vocento). The Vocento group includes historical brands as ABC, regional newspapers, online media, radio and TV. Vocento is listed in the Madrid Stock Exchange (Bolsa de Madrid).

== Art collector and patron of the arts ==
A keen supporter of the arts, he is vice-president of the Foundation for the Support of History of Hispanic Art (The Fundación de Apoyo a la Historia del Arte Hispánico), which backs young doctorates in arts and publishes their works, and vice-president of the Spanish Foundation for the Development of Corporate Patronage. In 1985, in collaboration with the José Ortega y Gasset Foundation, he created the Juan Lladó Award (Premio Juan Lladó), which is now recognized as one of the most prestigious awards within the business community in the field of patronage.

Diego del Alcázar’s personal interests include collecting classical and contemporary art. During the past three years the collection of his paintings have formed part of the most famous museum’s temporary exhibitions worldwide, including Guggenheim, Museo del Prado, The Tate Gallery in the UK, and Los Angeles Museum of Art.

Del Alcázar recently completed a 12-year restoration of Palacio de Tabladillo, a noble palace in northern Spain, which won the Special Mention Award, in the category of Conservation of Architectural Heritage, of Europa Nostra, a European Union Prize for Cultural Heritage / Europa Nostra Awards in 2006.

The earliest references on record to the “place” and tower and municipality and inheritance of the Palace appear in the 8th century. From the late Middle Ages to the mid 15th century, the site’s overriding priority was that of protection and defence as evidenced by the “tower-fortress”, architectonic style, complemented with an additional storey. During the 16th century, the influence of the renaissance movement that had taken place in Italy during the previous century began to spread throughout Europe, fuelling the renovation of Spain’s older civil buildings to bring them into line with the new style, and equipping them with the courtyards and façades that are so characteristic of 16th-century Spanish renaissance palaces.

At this time in history, when there was no longer such an urgent need to make defence an overriding objective, property extensions were now mainly for aesthetic purposes and hence the stronghold became a prime example of suburban noble architecture of the 16th century, markedly renaissance in style, shedding the medieval functions described later.

This example is an unusual one in Castilian – and Spanish - architecture and history because hardly any Medieval and Renaissance mansions remained in the countryside as the Monarchs insisted on the presence of the nobles in the Court. Only at the end of the 18th century and in Andalusia did noble mansions appear outside the towns.

This is therefore an unusual house for Spain, one that existed at the same time as the great Italian houses or villas. It gives witness to how life was lived as from the High Middle Ages and is therefore a significant part of the Spanish Cultural heritage.

== Distinctions ==
Diego del Alcázar holds the Spanish Grand Cross of the Civil Order of Alfonso X El Sabio (Gran Cruz de la Orden de Alfonso X el Sabio). This distinction is granted by the Minister of Education and Culture of Spain to Spaniards or foreigners for extraordinary contributions in the fields of education, science, culture, teaching or research.

== Interviews ==
- Fuchs, Dale. "A coming of age for Spain's contemporary art scene", Herald Tribune, February 12, 2006.
- Crawford, Leslie. "Spain relaxed as it embraces the benefits", Financial Times, April 24, 2007.
