= Marquis of Casa Irujo =

Marquisate of Casa Irujo
- Creation date: 8 March 1803
- Created by: Carlos IV of Spain
- First holder: Carlos Martínez de Irujo
- Present holder: Carlos Martínez de Irujo
- Remainder to: Heirs of the body of the grantee
- Status: Extant

Marquis of Casa Irujo (Spanish: Marqués de Casa Irujo) is a hereditary title of Spanish nobility. It was created on 8 March 1803 by King Charles IV of Spain in favor of Carlos Martínez de Irujo, the Spanish minister to the United States from 1796 to 1807.

On 24 December 1890, King Alfonso XIII of Spain granted the accompanying dignity of Grandee to the third marquis, Carlos Martínez de Irujo y del Alcázar.

The name of the marquisate refers to the surname of the first holder.

== Marquises of Casa Irujo (1803) ==
	Holder of Title	Period	Notes
Created by King Charles IV Spain
1	Carlos Martínez de Irujo y Tacón	1803–1824	
2	Carlos Martínez de Irujo y McKean	1824–1855	
3	Carlos Martínez de Irujo y del Alcázar	1855–1904	
4	Carlos Martínez de Irujo y Caro	1904–1906	
5	Pedro Martínez de Irujo y Caro	1906–1942	
6	Ignacio Martínez de Irujo y Artázcoz	1942–1980	
7	Carlos Martínez de Irujo y Crespo	1980–	
