= Dénes Andrássy =

Hungarian nobleman

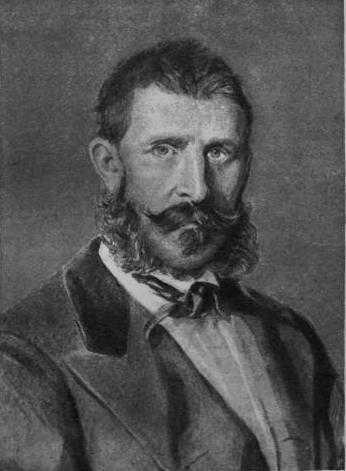
- Born: 19 November 1835; Krasznahorkaváralja, Kingdom of Hungary, Austrian Empire
- Died: 23 February 1913 (aged 77); Palermo, Sicily
- Spouse: Franziska Seraphica Hablawetz
- Parent(s): György Andrássy; Franziska von Königsegg-Aulendorf

Count Dénes Andrássy de Csíkszentkirály et Krasznahorka (19 November 1835 – 23 February 1913) was a Hungarian nobleman, who served as chairman of the Hungarian Heraldic and Genealogical Society. He was a wealthy, generous and enlightened patron of the arts.

== Biography ==
Born into the Andrássy family, one of the most important Hungarian noble families, he was the son of Count György Andrássy and Countess Franziska von Königsegg-Aulendorf, member of an old German nobility. He married Franciska Seraphica Hablawetz (1838-1902), member of a Viennese bourgeois family. The couple didn't have children. After her death he founded Franciska Relic Museum in his birthplace.

He was a member of the Hungarian Academy of Sciences.
