= Carlos Martínez de Irujo, 1st Marquis of Casa Irujo =

Spanish politician and diplomat (1763–1824)

The Most Excellent The Marquis of Casa Irujo
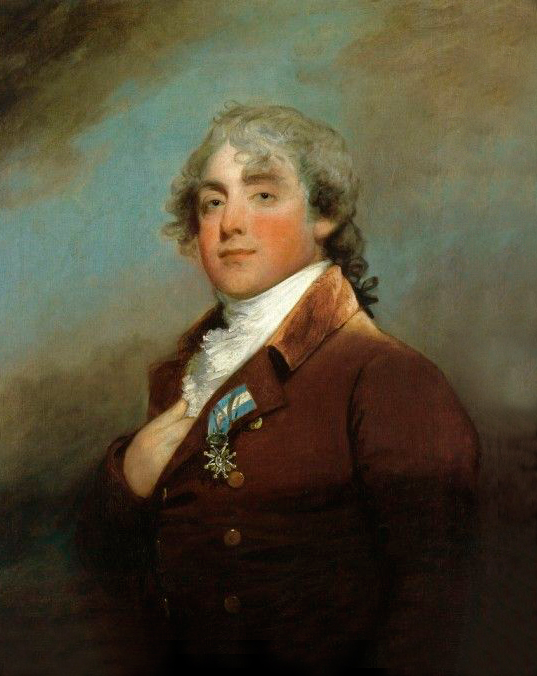
- 1804 portrait of de Irujo by Gilbert Stuart

Prime Minister of Spain
- In office 2 December 1823 – 17 January 1824
- Monarch: Ferdinand VII
- Preceded by: Víctor Damián Sáez
- Succeeded by: Narciso Fernández de Heredia

Personal details
- Born: Carlos Martínez de Irujo y Tacón; 4 December 1763 Cartagena, Murcia, Spain
- Died: 17 January 1824 (aged 60) Madrid, Spain
- Spouse: Sarah McKean (m. 1798; died 1824)

Carlos Martínez de Irujo y Tacón, 1st Marquis of Casa Irujo (4 December 1763 – 17 January 1824) was a Spanish politician and diplomat who served as the Prime Minister of Spain from 1823 to 1824.

== Early life ==
His father was Manuel Martinez de Irujo y de Erice, an army commissioner, and his mother was Narcisa Tacón y Gamiz (born Beriain, Navarre, 1740). He had two siblings, Narcisa Martínez de Irujo y Tacón and María Rafaela Martínez de Irujo y Tacón.

He studied at University of Salamanca.

== Career ==
In 1785, he served on the Spanish mission to the Netherlands. In 1793, he served on the Spanish embassy in London, England. He translated Adam Smith's The Wealth of Nations into Spanish.

Casa Irujo (often spelled Yrujo) was the Spanish minister to the United States from 1796 to 1807. Casa Irujo changed positions and became minister at Rio de Janeiro and then Paris.

He was Secretary of State (Prime Minister) of Spain (ministro de estado) three times, first in 1812, then in an interim capacity from 1818 to 1819, and finally for a few weeks from December 1823 until his death in January 1824.

== Personal life ==
In 1794 while an attaché at the Spanish embassy in London, he had a relationship with Sarah Knight (c. 1764–1841), resulting in an illegitimate daughter :

- Lavinia de Irujo (1794–1866), who had a relationship with Maj. Charles Augustus Jones (father of poet, dramatist and novelist Ernest Charles Jones); from that relationship, Lavinia herself later gave birth to two daughters out of wedlock, Frederika Lavinia Jones (who married Fredrick Ralph Caleb Jutsum) and Frances Augusta Jones.

There are several drawings of Lavinia by the artist Henry Fuseli.

In 1798, Don Carlos married Sarah Theresa McKean (1780–1841), the daughter of Pennsylvania governor Thomas McKean. The couple have been described as "intriguers of the highest order." Together, they were the parents of:

- Carlos Martínez de Irujo y McKean (1802–1855), who became Prime Minister of Spain for a short period in 1847; he married Gabriela del Alcázar, 7th Duchess of Sotomayor in 1844.
- Narcisa Martínez de Irujo y McKean, who married Blas Santiago Pierrard Alcédar.

The Marquess died on 17 January 1824, aged 58, in Madrid.

=== Character ===
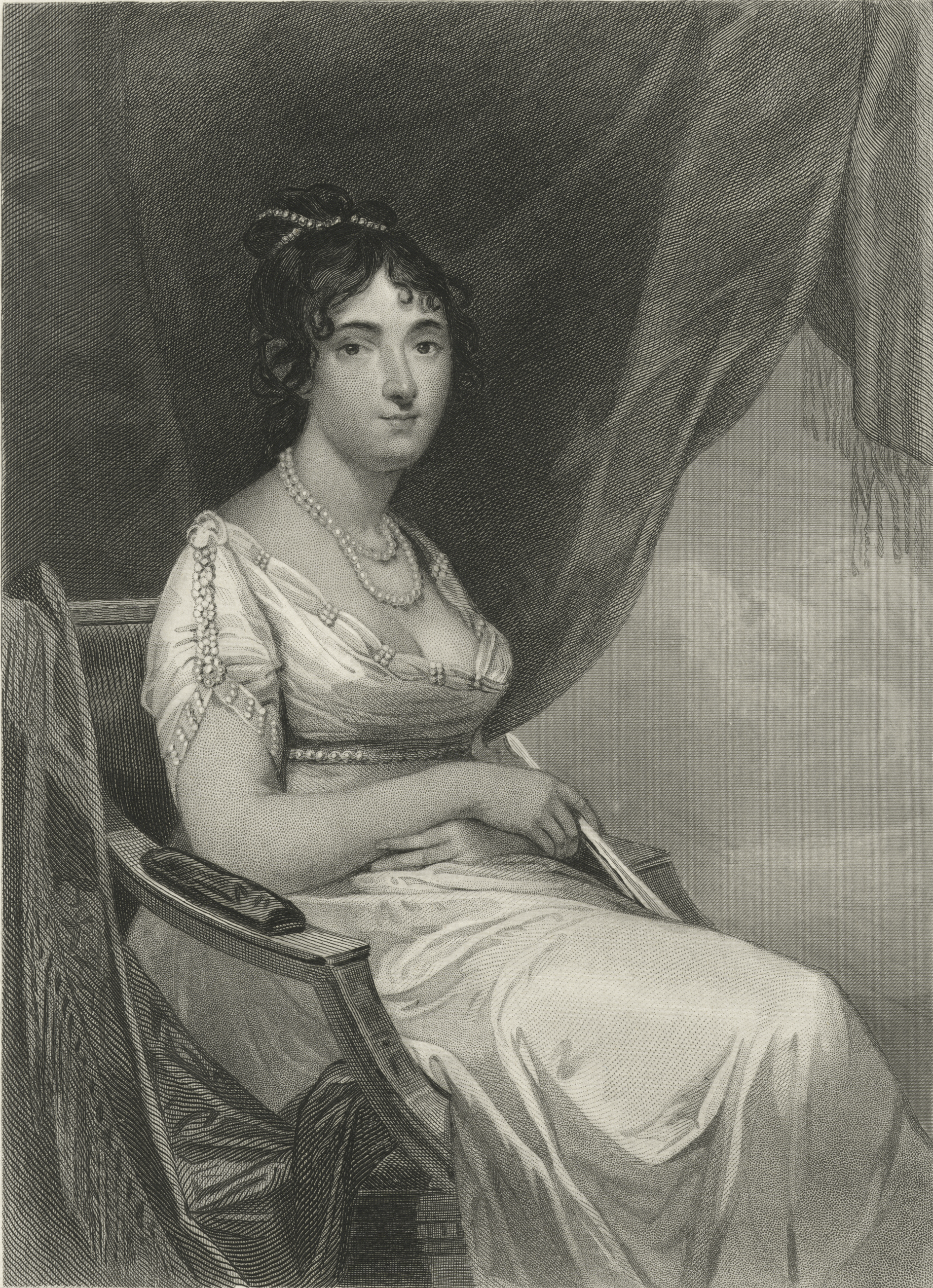
Sally McKean D'Yrujo

"He was an obstinate, impetuous and rather vain little person with reddish hair; enormously wealthy, endlessly touchy, extremely intelligent and vastly attractive … he liked America, he understood it and enjoyed it; he was tremendously popular at Philadelphia, and at Washington when he condescended to appear there; he was on intimate terms at the President's House. If he lost his temper from time to time, and thought nothing of haranguing the country through the newspapers, he served his King with energetic loyalty; he went about his business with dignity and shrewdness; he never forgot the respect due to his official person, however much he might indulge his democratic tendencies in private intercourse; he was the only Minister of the first rank in America, and consequently the leading figure in the diplomatic corps; he contributed to American society the brilliant qualities of his elegant and felicitous personality; he was a very great gentleman."

— from Aaron Burr, Samuel H. Wandell, Meade Minnigerode, 1925.

"Yrujo was doubly and trebly attached to the Administration. Proud as a typical Spaniard should be, and mingling and infusion of vanity with his pride; irascible, headstrong, indiscreet as was possible for a diplomatist, and afraid of no prince or president; young, able, quick, and aggressive; devoted to his King and country; a flighty and dangerous friend, but a most troublesome enemy; always in difficulties, but in spite of fantastic outbursts always respectable,—Yrujo needed only the contrast of characters such as those of Pickering or Madison to make him the most entertaining figure in Washington politics. He loved the rough-and-tumble of democratic habits, and remembered his diplomatic dignity only when he could use it as a weapon against a secretary of state. If he thought the Government to need assistance or warning, he wrote communications to the newspapers in a style which long experience had made familiar to the public and irritating to the Government whose acts he criticized."

- from The First Administration of Thomas Jefferson, Part I, Chapter 17

Spanish nobility
New creation	Marquess of Casa Irujo; 1803–1824	Succeeded by Carlos Martínez de Irujo
