= Marquisate of La Romana =

- Creation date: 16 June 1739
- Created by: Philip V
- Peerage: Peerage of Spain
- First holder: José Caro y Maza de Lizana, 1st Marquis of La Romana
- Present holder: Diego del Alcázar y Silvela, 10th Marquis of La Romana

Marquis of La Romana (Spanish: Marqués de La Romana) is a hereditary title in the Peerage of Spain accompanied by the dignity of Grandee, granted in 1739 by Philip V to José Caro, son of the Baron of the lordships of Moixent and Novelda.

The title makes reference to the town of La Romana, in Alicante.

== Marquises of La Romana (1739) ==
- José Caro y Maza de Lizana, 1st Marquis of La Romana (d. 1741)
- Pedro Caro y Fontes, 2nd Marquis of La Romana (1717–1775), son of the 1st Marquis
- Pedro Caro y Sureda, 3rd Marquis of La Romana (1761-1811), son of the 2nd Marquess
- Pedro Caro y Salas, 4th Marquis of La Romana (d. 1855), son of the 3rd Marquis
- Pedro Caro y Álvarez de Toledo, 5th Marquis of La Romana (1827–1888), son of the 4th Marquis
- Pedro Caro y Széchényi, 6th Marquis of La Romana (1849–1916), son of the 5th Marquis
- Pedro Caro y Martínez de Irujo, 7th Marquis of La Romana (1884–1965), son of the 6th Marquis
- María de la Piedad Caro y Martínez de Irujo, 8th Marchioness of La Romana (1884–1965), daughter of the 6th Marquis
- Diego del Alcázar y Caro, 9th Marquis of La Romana (1925–1994), son of the 8th Marchioness
- Diego del Alcázar y Silvela, 10th Marquis of La Romana (b. 1950), son of the 9th Marquis

== See also ==
- List of current grandees of Spain
