= György Andrássy =

Hungarian politician (1797–1872)

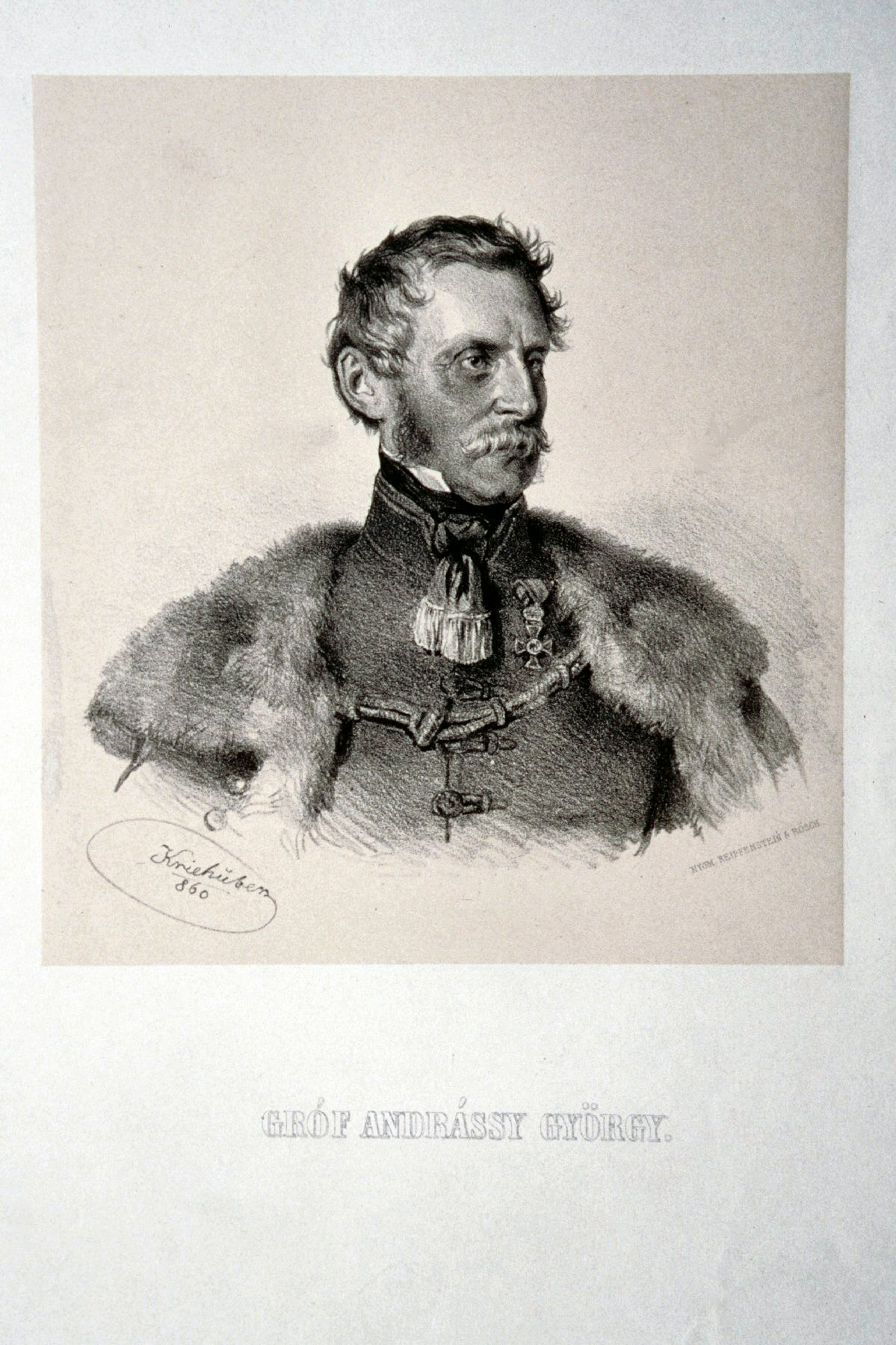
- Born: February 5, 1797; Kassa, Kingdom of Hungary
- Died: December 19, 1872 (aged 75); Vienna, Austria-Hungary
- Political party: Conservative Party
- Spouse: Franziska zu Königsegg-Aulendorf
- Children: Mária Kajetana Franciska; Dénes István György Klement; Erzsébet Mária Kajetana Franciska Georgina Neita; György Péter Klement István

Count György Andrássy de Csíkszentkirály et Krasznahorka (February 5, 1797 – December 19, 1872) was a Hungarian nobleman, Imperial and Royal Chamberlain, Privy Councillor, Master of Cup-bearers, Chairman of the Tisza Rail Track Corporation and Upper Hungary Mining Association. He served as judge royal from 1863 to 1865.

He was one of the founders of the Hungarian Academy of Sciences. He supported the creation of that scientific organization with 10 500 Ft.

== Works ==
- Gróf Andrássy Györgynek és gróf Széchenyi Istvánnak a budapesti hid-egyesülethez irányzott jelentése, midőn külföldről visszatérének. Pozsony, 1833. (Hungarian and German language)
- Budapestnek árviz ellen megóvásáról. Pest, 1845.

== Family ==
He married Franciska Königsegg-Aulendorfi in 1834. They had four children (including Dénes Andrássy).

Political offices
Preceded by György Apponyi	Judge royal 1863–1865	Succeeded by György Majláth
