= Franziska zu Königsegg-Aulendorf =

German noblewoman (1814–1871)

- Born: 3 July 1814; Aulendorf, Duchy of Württemberg, Holy Roman Empire
- Died: 22 April 1871 (aged 56); Vienna, Austria-Hungary

Franziska Gräfin zu Königsegg-Aulendorf (Hungarian: Königsegg-Aulendorfi Franciska grófnő, 3 July 1814 – 22 April 1871) was a German noblewoman.

Her parents were Graf Franz Xavier Karl zu Königsegg-Aulendorf and Countess Mária Anna Károlyi de Nagykároly. Her grandfather was Count József Károlyi. She married Count György Andrássy in 1834. They had four children (including Count Dénes Andrássy).

== The Andrássy heritage ==
Her elder son Dénes entered into a misalliance with Franciska Hablawetz from a Viennese bourgeois family in 1866 in Pisa. The parents strongly opposed their son's decision, but could not prevent the marriage. György Andrássy excluded Dénes from the heritage in 1866. Their youngest son, György Jr. became the new heir but died suddenly in 1871, Madeira. György Sr. died in 1872. Dénes regained his original birthright.
