= Carlos Martínez de Irujo, 2nd Marquess of Casa Irujo =

Spanish politician

The Most Excellent Carlos Martínez de Irujo 2nd Marquess of Casa Irujo GE

Prime Minister of Spain
- In office 28 January 1847 – 28 March 1847
- Monarch: Isabella II
- Preceded by: Francisco Javier Isturiz y Montero
- Succeeded by: Joaquin Francisco Pacheco

Personal details
- Born: Carlos Fernando Martínez de Irujo y Mckean; 14 December 1802 Washington, D.C., United States
- Died: 26 December 1855 (53 years) Madrid, Spain

Carlos Fernando Martínez de Irujo y McKean, 2nd Marquess of Casa Irujo, jure uxoris Duke of Sotomayor, Grandee of Spain (14 December 1802 – 26 December 1855) was a Spanish noble and politician who served as Prime Minister of Spain. Additionally, he is a male line ancestor of the current duke of Alba.

== Early life ==
Martínez de Irujo was born on 14 December 1802 in Washington, D.C. He was son of the diplomat Carlos Martínez de Irujo y Erice, 1st Marquess of Casa Irujo, and his wife Sarah McKean.

His mother was the daughter of the Pennsylvania Governor and signer of the United States Declaration of Independence Thomas McKean and Pennsylvania First Lady Sarah Armitage McKean.

== Career ==
Martínez de Irujo served as Prime Minister of Spain from 28 January 1847 to 28 March 1847, concurrently while serving as Minister of State. He again served as Minister of State from 23 October 1847 to 29 July 1848.

== Personal life ==
Don Carlos became a Grandee of Spain in 1844 through his marriage to Gabriela del Alcázar, 7th Duchess of Sotomayor through which he gained the courtesy title, Duke of Sotomayor. Together, they were the parents of two children:

- Carlos Martínez de Irujo y del Alcázar (1846–1909), 8th Duke of Sotomayor and 3rd Marquess of Casa Irujo.
- María de la Piedad Martínez de Irujo y del Alcázar, who married Pedro Caro y Széchényi, 6th Marquis of La Romana

Martínez de Irujo died on 26 December 1855 in Madrid.

Political offices
Preceded by Francisco Javier de Istúriz	Prime Minister of Spain; 28 January 1847 – 28 March 1847	Succeeded by Joaquín Francisco Pacheco
Preceded by Francisco Javier de Istúriz	Minister of State; 28 January 1847 – 28 March 1847	Succeeded by Joaquín Francisco Pacheco
Preceded by The Duke of Valencia	Minister of State; 23 October 1847 – 29 July 1848	Succeeded by The Marquess of Pidal
Spanish nobility
Preceded by Carlos Martínez de Irujo	Marquess of Casa Irujo; 1824 – 1855	Succeeded by Carlos Martínez de Irujo
