= List of ambassadors of Spain to Japan =

Spanish Ambassadors to Japan

Coordinates: 35.665585°N 139.741694°E

Ambassador of Spain to Japan
- Coat of Arms of Spain
- Incumbent; Fidel Sendagorta Gómez del Campillo since 8 February 2022
- Ministry of Foreign Affairs
- Style: His Excellency
- Nominator: Minister of Foreign Affairs
- Appointer: The Monarch
- Deputy: Deputy Chief of Mission at the Embassy of Spain to Japan

The ambassador of Spain to Japan is the Kingdom of Spain's foremost diplomatic representative in Japan. The current ambassador is Fidel Sendagorta Gómez del Campillo, who was appointed by Pedro Sánchez's government on 8 February 2022.

== History ==
The Spanish ambassador is appointed to the Council of Ministers. Among his functions is to direct the work of all the offices that depend on the embassy, based in Tokyo. Likewise, it informs the Spanish Government about the evolution of events in Japan, negotiates on behalf of Spain, can sign or ratify agreements, observes the development of bilateral relations in all fields and ensures the protection of Spanish interests and its citizens in Japan.

== List of ambassadors (since 1592) ==
| Designated/ Accredited | End of Mission | Ambassador | Head of State | Prime Minister of Japan | Notes |
|---|---|---|---|---|---|
| 1592 | 1592 | Juan Cobo | Philip II | Go-Yōzei Tennō | |
| 1593 | | San Pedro Bautista | Philip II | Go-Yōzei Tennō | Father Pedro Bautista, a Franciscan, was sent to Japan with three other companions. |
| 1611 | 1613 | Sebastián Vizcaíno | Philip III | Go-Mizunoo Tennō | |
| 15 November 1868 | 8 March 1869 | José Luis Ceacero Inguanzo | Provisional Government | Meiji Tenno | Minister Plenipotentiary of the Yokohama Legation |
| 8 March 1869 | | Tiburcio Rodríguez y Muñoz | Alfonso XII | Meiji Tenno | Charge d'affaires |
| 30 June 1875 | 7 October 1879 | Mariano Álvarez | Alfonso XII | Meiji Tenno | Minister Plenipotentiary of the Legation in Tokyo |
| 7 June 1883 | 28 December 1884 | Luis del Castillo y Trigueros | Alfonso XII | Meiji Tenno | |
| 5 June 1886 | | José Delvat y Arêas | María Cristina | Itō Hirobumi | |
| 11 December 1888 | 11 January 1895 | Luis del Castillo y Trigueros | María Cristina | Kuroda Kiyotaka | Envoy Extraordinary and Minister Plenipotentiary |
| 9 July 1896 | 14 May 1907 | Luis de la Barrera y Riera | María Cristina | Itō Hirobumi | |
| 19 August 1907 | September 1915 | Ramiro Gil de Uribarri | Alfonso XIII | Katsura Tarō | |
| 8 October 1915 | April 1924 | José Caro y Széchényi | Alfonso XIII | Ōkuma Shigenobu | |
| March 1925 | July 1929 | Pedro Quartin y del Saz Caballero | Alfonso XIII | Wakatsuki Reijirō | |
| July 1929 | January 1931 | Luis Dupuy de Lôme y Vidiella | Alfonso XIII | Hamaguchi Osachi | Charge d'affaires |
| January 1931 | January 1932 | Juan Francisco de Cárdenas y Rodríguez de Rivas | Alfonso XIII | Shidehara Kijūrō | Envoy Extraordinary and Minister Plenipotentiary |
| January 1932 | April 1932 | Pedro Antonio Satorras y Dameto | Niceto Alcalá Zamora | Inukai Tsuyoshi | Charge d'affaires |
| April 1932 | 26 August 1936 | Santiago Méndez de Vigo y Méndez de Vigo | Niceto Alcalá Zamora | Saitō Makoto | Envoy Extraordinary and Minister Plenipotentiary |
| 26 August 1936 | April 1937 | Juan Gômez de Molina | Francisco Franco | Hirota Koki | Charge d'affaires |
| April 1937 | December 1937 | José Luis Álvarez | Francisco Franco | Hayashi Senjūrō | |
| December 1937 | October 1938 | Francisco José del Castillo | Francisco Franco | Konoe Fumimaro | |
| October 1938 | 12 April 1945 | Santiago Méndez de Vigo y Méndez de Vigo | Francisco Franco | Konoe Fumimaro | Envoy Extraordinary and Minister Plenipotentiary |
| 28 April 1952 | | Francisco José del Castillo | Francisco Franco | Yoshida Shigeru | Ambassador |
| 14 October 1954 | | Pelayo García Olay Álvarez | Francisco Franco | Ichirō Hatoyama | Minister in Damascus |
| 25 February 1958 | 25 June 1964 | Antonio Villacieros y Benito | Francisco Franco | Nobusuke Kishi | |
| 23 July 1963 | 7 February 1970 | Luis García de Llera y Rodríguez | Francisco Franco | Hayato Ikeda | |
| 1970 | July 1973 | Alfonso Merry del Val y Alzola | Francisco Franco | Eisaku Satō | Ambassador to the United States |
| 27 July 1973 | | Joaquín Gutiérrez Cano | Luis Carrero Blanco | Tanaka Kakuei | |
| 3 May 1974 | 6 March 1981 | José Aragonés Vilá | Carlos Arias Navarro | Miki Takeo | |
| 6 March 1981 | 19 May 1985 | Eduardo Ibañez y García de Velasco | Leopoldo Calvo-Sotelo | Zenkō Suzuki | |
| 19 May 1985 | 19 May 1985 | Camilo Barcia García-Villamil | Felipe González | Nakasone Yasuhiro | |
| 11 May 1990 | 25 November 1994 | Antonio de Oyarzábal Marchesi | Felipe González | Kaifu Toshiki | |
| 23 December 1994 | 18 March 1999 | Santiago Salas Collantes | Felipe González | Tomiichi Murayama | |
| 18 March 1999 | 20 September 2002 | Juan Bautista Leña Casas | José María Aznar | Keizō Obuchi | |
| 20 September 2002 | 22 January 2006 | Francisco Javier Conde de Saro | José María Aznar | Jun'ichirō Koizumi | |
| 22 January 2006 | 8 January 2010 | Miguel Ángel Carriedo Mompín | José Luis Rodríguez Zapatero | Shinzō Abe | |
| 8 January 2010 | 24 October 2014 | Miguel Ángel Navarro Portera | José Luis Rodríguez Zapatero | Naoto Kan | |
| 15 January 2015 | 22 October 2018 | Gonzalo de Benito Secades | Mariano Rajoy | Shinzō Abe | |
| 22 October 2018 | 8 February 2022 | Jorge Toledo Albiñana | Pedro Sánchez | Shinzō Abe | |
| 8 February 2022 | In office | Fidel Sendagorta Gómez del Campillo | Pedro Sánchez | Fumio Kishida | |
