= Ferenc Széchényi =

Hungarian nobleman and statesman

Count Ferenc Széchényi
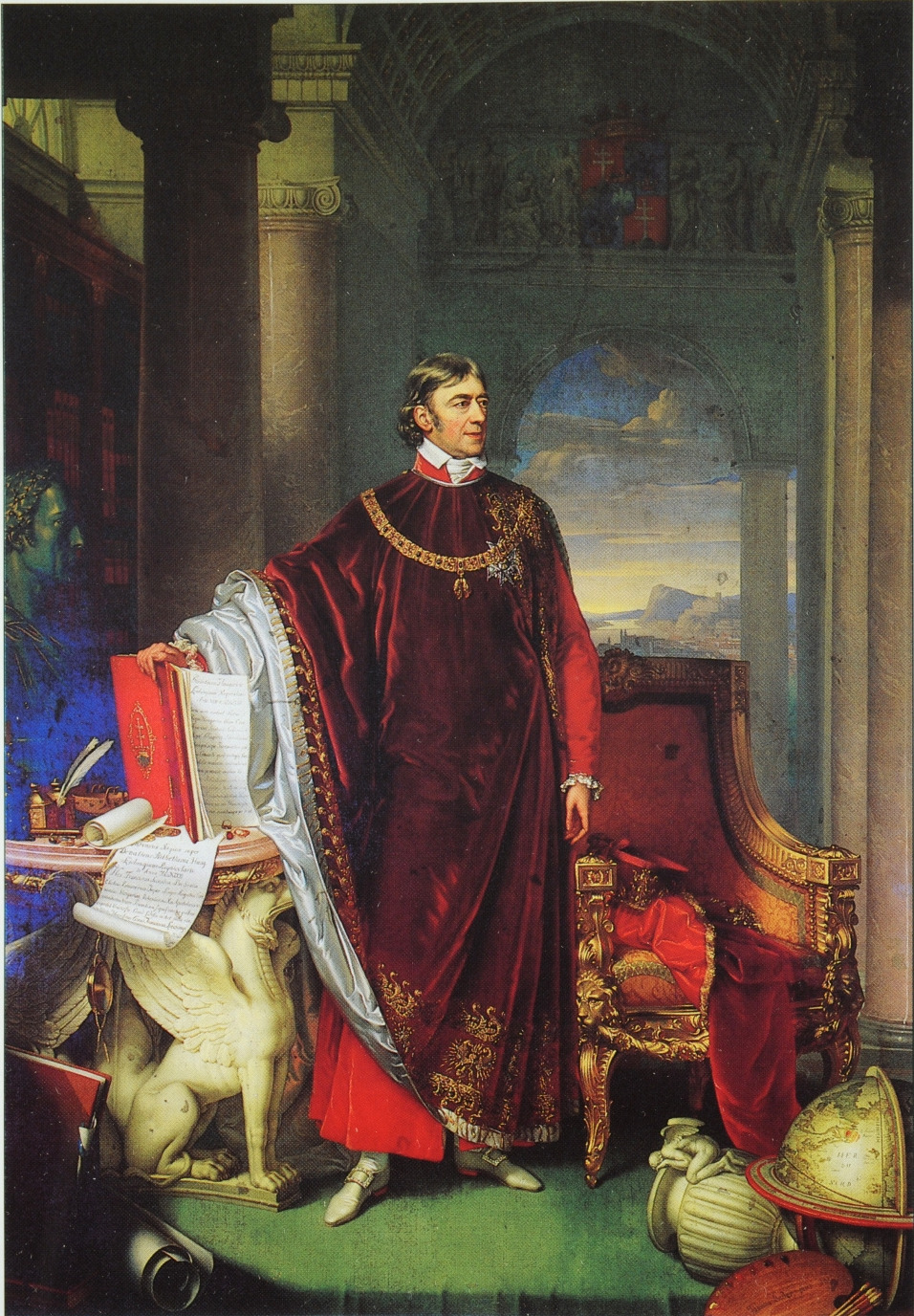
- Portrait of Count Széchényi, by Johann Ender, 1823
- Born: 28 April 1754; Fertőszéplak, Kingdom of Hungary
- Died: 13 December 1820 (aged 66); Vienna, Austrian Empire
- Occupation: politician
- Spouse: Julianna Festetics (m. 1777; died 1820)
- Children: 6, including Pál, István
- Parent(s): Sigismund Széchény; Mary Cziráky

Count Ferenc Széchényi de Sárvár-Felsővidék (28 April 1754 – 13 December 1820) was a Hungarian nobleman and statesman, known for founding the Hungarian National Library and the National Museum in Budapest.

== Early life ==
He was born on 28 April 1754 in Fertőszéplak, Kingdom of Hungary. He was the sixth child of Count Zsigmond Széchényi (1720–1769), a captain of the hussars and Imperial and Royal Chamberlain and his wife Countess Mária Cziráky of Cirák and Dénesfalva (1724–1787). His godparents were Doctor Ádám Groff and his wife Katalin Khellesz. He had an older brother and three sisters who all married into prominent Austro-Hungarian noble families.

He was educated at the Theresianum in Vienna.

== Career ==
From 1785 to 1786, he was Lord-Lieutenant of Tolna County, Somogy County, Baranya County, Syrmia County, Virovitica County, and Pécs. From 1798 to 1811, he was again Lord-Lieutenant of Somogy County, while also serving as Lord-Lieutenant of Vas County from 1807 to 1811.

He founded the National Museum in Budapest and the Hungarian National Library, which, today, is named the National Széchényi Library after him.

He was made a Knight of the Order of the Golden Fleece in 1808.

== Personal life ==
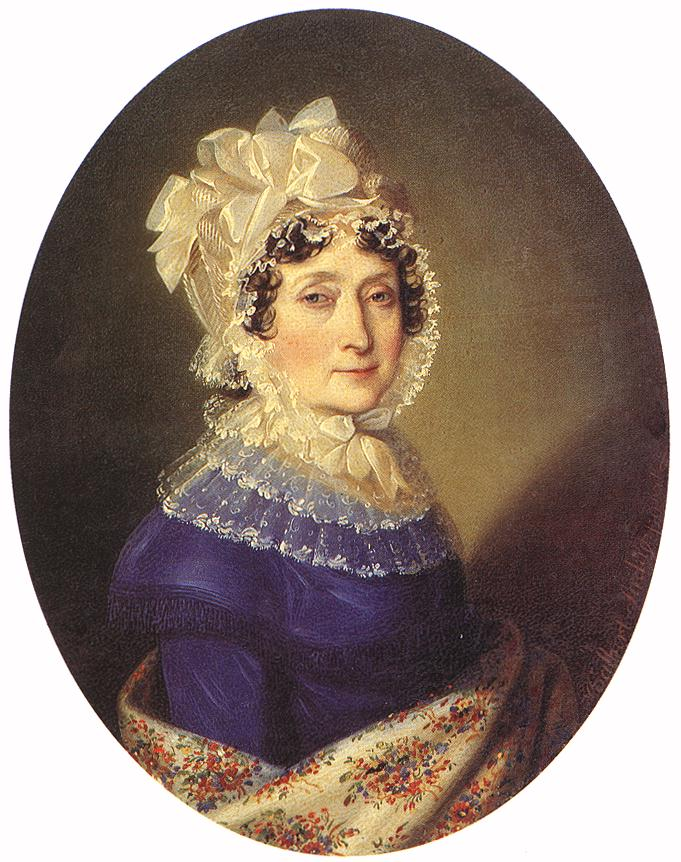
Portrait of his wife, Countess Julia Festetics de Tolna, by Johann Ender, 1817

On 17 August 1777 in Kópháza, Count Ferenc married Countess Julia Festetics de Tolna (1753–1824). Together, they were the parents of six children, including:

- Count György Mária János Széchényi (1778–1778), who died in infancy.
- Count Lajos Mária Alajos Dániel Ignác Széchényi (1781–1855), who married Countess Aloisia von Clam und Gallas. After her death in 1822, he married Countess Franziska von Wurmbrand-Stuppach.
- Countess Franziska Karolina Széchényi (1783–1861), who married Count Maria Miklós Valentin János Baptist Alajos Batthyány.
- Countess Zsófia "Sophie" Széchényi (1788–1865), who married Count Ferdinánd Zichy-Vázsonykő.
- Count Pál Széchényi (1789–1871), who married Lady Caroline Meade, a daughter of Richard Meade, 2nd Earl of Clanwilliam. After her death in 1820, he married Emilie Zichy-Ferraris.
- Count István Széchenyi (1791–1860), who married Countess Crescencia von Seilern und Aspang in 1836.

Count Ferenc died on 13 December 1820 in Vienna.

=== Descendants ===
Through his son Pal, he was a grandfather of, among others, Elise Széchényi (1827–1910), who married Pedro Caro y Álvarez de Toledo, 5th Marquis of La Romana, and Pál Széchenyi (1838–1901), the Minister of Agriculture, Industry and Trade of Hungary from October 1882 to April 1889.

Through his son István, he was a grandfather of Ödön Széchenyi (1839–1922), an Imperial Ottoman pasha who was in charge of the State Fire Brigade in Hungary and the Ottoman Empire.
