= Zichy family =

Hungarian noble family

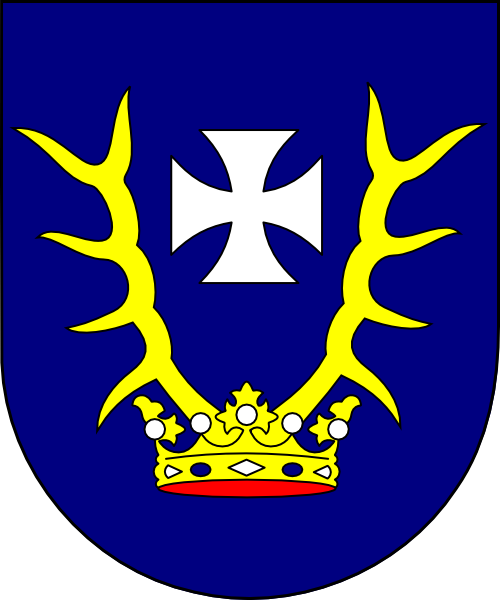
Arms of the Zichy family

The House of Zichy (of Zich and Vázsonykő) is the name of an ancient Magyar family of the Hungarian nobility, conspicuous in Hungarian history from the latter part of the 13th century onwards.

== History ==
The first authentic ancestor of the Zichy bore the name of Gal (Gál) Zayk, and Zayk was the surname of the family until it came into possession of Zich in the 14th century. They first came into great prominence in the 17th century, being given countly rank in 1679 in the person of the imperial general Stefan Zichy (d. 1693). His descendants divided, first into two branches: those of Zichy-Palota and Zichy-Karlburg. The Palota line, divided again into three: that of Nagy-Lang, that of Adony and Szent-Miklos, and that of Palota, which died out in the male line in 1874. The line of Zichy-Karlburg (since 1811 Zichy-Ferraris) split into four branches: that of Vedrod, that of Vezsony, and those of Daruvar and Csics, now extinct.

== Notable members ==
- Count Károly Zichy (1753–1826) was the Austrian war minister in 1809 and minister of the interior in 1813–1814; his sons,
  - Count Károly (1779–1834) was the Governor of Moson County
  - Count Ferdinánd (1783–1862) was the Austrian field-marshal condemned to ten years' imprisonment for surrendering Venice to the insurgents in 1848 (he was pardoned in 1851).
- Count Ödön [Edmund] Zichy (1809–1848), administrator of the county of Veszprém, was hanged on 30 September 1848 by order of a Hungarian court-martial, presided over by Görgey, for acting as Jelačić's emissary to the imperial general Roth.
- Count Ferenc Zichy (1811–1900) was secretary of state for commerce in the Széchenyi ministry of 1848, but retired on the outbreak of the revolution, joined the imperial side, and acted as imperial commissary; from 1874 to 1880 he was Austrian ambassador at Constantinople and representative of Austria-Hungary at the 1876-1877 Constantinople Conference.
- Count Ödön [Edmund] Zichy (1811–1894) was remarkable for his great activity in promoting art and industry in Austria-Hungary; he founded the Oriental Museum in Vienna. He was after Count Johann Nepomuk (Hans) Wilczek, the second highest sponsor for the Austro-Hungarian North Pole Expedition to Franz Josef Land. His son,
  - Count Jenő [Eugen] Zichy (1837–1906), inherited his father's notable collections, and followed him in his economic activities; he three times visited the Caucasus and Central Asia to investigate the original seat of the Magyars, publishing as the result Voyages au Caucase (2 vols., Budapest, 1897) and Dritte asiatische Forschungsreise (6 vols., in Magyar and German; Budapest and Leipzig, 1900–1905).
- Count Ferdinánd Zichy (born 1829), vice-president of the Hungarian stadtholdership under the Mailath regime, was condemned in 1863 under the press laws to the loss of his titles and to imprisonment. In 1867, he was elected to the Hungarian parliament, at first joining the party of Deák, and subsequently becoming one of the founders and leaders of the Catholic People's Party (see History of Hungary). His second son,
  - Count Aladár Zichy (born 1864), also a member of the Catholic People's Party, was made minister of the royal household in the Wekerle cabinet of 1906.
- Count József Zichy (13 November 1841 – 11 November 1924), politician
- Count János Zichy (born 1868), also from 1896 to 1906 a member of the Catholic People's Party in the Lower House, and after 1906 attached to Andrássy's Constitutional Party, was of importance as the confidant of the heir to the throne, the Archduke Francis Ferdinand.
- Count Géza Zichy (born 1849), nephew of the Count Ferenc mentioned above, studied under Franz Liszt and became a professional pianist; in 1891 he became intendant of the Hungarian national opera-house, a member of the Hungarian Upper House and head of the Conservatoire at Budapest.
- Count Mihály Zichy (born 1829), one of the most conspicuous Hungarian painters, was appointed court painter at St. Petersburg in 1847 and accompanied the Russian emperors on their various journeys. The National Gallery at Budapest possesses some of his paintings, notably that of "Queen Elizabeth before the coffin of Francis Drake"; but he is best known for his illustrations of the works of the great Magyar writers (Petőfi, Arany, etc.).
- Tamás Zichy (born 1974), son of an Austro-Hungarian magnate, is reported from Forbes Magazine to be the richest heir in Austria.
- Count Avgust Zichy (1852–1925) – travel writer, poet, governor of Fiume and owner of Castle Beltinci. His daughter
  - Countess Teodora Zichy (1886-1915) together with her sisters Anastasia and Maria volunteered to serve the wounded during First World War and found herself tuberculosis; died in the hearing of sanctity.
- Baron Ivan Rubido Zichy de Zich et Zagorje (born 17 June 1874, died Graz, 16 May 1964) Royal Hungarian Minister to the Court of St.James, 1926.
- Count Theodore Zichy (13 June 1908–February 1988), a British actor, photographer, film director, producer, and playboy.
- Count Imre Zichy (22 July 1909–28 September 1999), a left-handed amateur tennis player, count and inventor.

== See also ==
- History of Hungary
- Zichy Land
- List of titled noble families in the Kingdom of Hungary
