= List of wars involving Lebanon =

This is a list of wars involving Lebanon.

== Autonomous Mount Lebanon under Ottoman rule (1516-1920). ==
War	Combatant 1	Combatant 2	Result
1585 Ottoman expedition against the Druze	Mount Lebanon Emirate; Druze rebels	Ottoman Empire	Ottoman victory
Battle of Anjar (1623)	Mount Lebanon Emirate Supported by: Grand Duchy of Tuscany	Ottoman Empire: Ottoman Syria	Lebanese strategic victory: Fakhr-al-Din II captures Ottoman commander Mustafa Pasha al-Hannaq; Mount Lebanon remained semi-autonomous; Ma'nid authority imposed in Mount Lebanon; Territory of the Mount Lebanon Emirate at its greatest extent.
1711 Druze Civil Conflict	Qaysi faction; Shihab dynasty; Abu'l Lama clan of Matn; Talhuq clan of Gharb; Nakad clan of Manasif and Shahhar; Imad clan of Arqub; Abd al-Malik clan of Jurd; Khazen clan of Keserwan; Jumblatt clan of Chouf; Supported by: Harfush clan	Yamani faction; Alam al-Din clan; Arslan clan of Gharb; Sawaf clan of Matn; Supported by: Ottoman governors of Sidon and Damascus	Qaysi victory: Qaysi political dominance of Mount Lebanon; Yamani Druze exodus to Jabal al-Druze.
Civil Conflict in Mount Lebanon (1860)	Maronite militiamen Chehab dynasty Supported by: French expeditionary forces	Druze clans Supported by: Ottoman government	Reunification of Mount Lebanon: Establishment of the autonomous Mount Lebanon Mutasarrifate under French protection with a Christian Mutasarrif.; French military intervention

== Lebanese Republic (1920-present) ==
War	Combatant 1	Combatant 2	Result
Syria–Lebanon campaign (1941)	United Kingdom: India; Assyrian levies; Mandatory Palestine; Palmach; Transjordan; Australia; Free French; Czechoslovakia	Vichy France: Syria; Lebanon; Supported by: Germany	Defeat: Syria and Lebanon taken over by Free France
First Arab–Israeli War (1948–1949)	Arab League: Egypt; All-Palestine Protectorate (Note: After 22 September 1948); Holy War Army; Transjordan; Iraq; Syria; Lebanon (Note: Lebanon had decided to not participate in the war and only took part in the battle of al-Malikiya on 5–6 June 1948.); Saudi Arabia; Yemen Irregulars: Arab Liberation Army; Al-Najjada; Holy War Army	Israel Before 26 May 1948: (Israel) Yishuv; Paramilitary groups: Haganah; Palmach; Hish; Him; Irgun; Lehi; Allied Bedouin tribes After 26 May 1948: Israel Defense Forces; Minorities Unit; Foreign volunteers: Mahal	Defeat (limited involvement): Establishment of the State of Israel, Jordanian annexation of the West Bank, Egyptian occupation of the Gaza Strip; 1948 Palestinian expulsion and flight; Beginning of the Palestinian Fedayeen insurgency
1949 SSNP uprising (July 1949)	Lebanese government: Lebanese Armed Forces	SSNP; Led by Antoun Saadeh	Lebanese government victory: Uprising suppressed by the Lebanese Army within approximately 72 hours.; Attempts to seize government positions in the Beqaa Valley and advance on Beirut defeated.; Husni al-Za'im handed Saadeh over to Lebanese authorities on 6 July 1949.; Saadeh executed on 8 July 1949 following a military trial.
Lebanon Crisis (1958)	Government: Lebanese Armed Forces; Kataeb Party; Syrian Social Nationalist Party; ARF; United States	Opposition: Najjadeh Party; Progressive Socialist Party; Lebanese Communist Party; Al-Mourabitoun; UAR	inconclusive: President Camille Chamoun forced to step down; Formation of Second Cabinet of Rashid Karami, which included opposition elements
Coup d'état attempt (1961)	Lebanese Government; Lebanese Armed Forces	SSNP-L	Lebanese Government victory: Coup attempt fails
Insurgency in South Lebanon (1968–1982)	Israel; Free Lebanon: SLA; Lebanese Front	PLO; Syria; LNM; Supported by: Soviet Union	Israeli-Lebanese Front victory: Expulsion of the Palestine Liberation Organization from Lebanese territory to Tunisia, after Israel's invasion of Lebanon in 1982; Beginning of the South Lebanon conflict in 1985; Syrian occupation of Lebanon (1976–2005); Israeli occupation of Lebanon (1985–2000)
Lebanese Civil War (1975–1990)	LF; Syria Tigers Militia; ALZ Israel; SLA United States; France; Italy; United Kingdom	LNM; LNRF; Amal; LCP; SSNP; PLO Hezbollah; Al-Tawhid Syria; PLA; ADF	Taif Agreement: Christian 6:5 ascendancy replaced by 1:1 representation; Defeat of PLO and LNM, peace agreement between other internal militias; Syrian occupation of Lebanon and the Israeli Security Zone
South Lebanon Conflict (1985–2000)	Hezbollah; Amal; Lebanese Communist Party; Jammoul; PFLP–GC	Israel; South Lebanon Army	Hezbollah-led victory: Collapse of the SLA and its provisional government; Israeli withdrawal and end of its occupation of Southern Lebanon
Shebaa Farms conflict (2000–2006)	Hezbollah	Israel	Inconclusive: Ended with the 2006 Lebanon War; Israel continues to control the Shebaa Farms
Cedar Revolution (2005)	March 14 Alliance; Kataeb Party; Lebanese Forces; Future Movement; Progressive Socialist Party; National Liberal Party; Democratic Left Movement; National Bloc; Independence Movement; Free Patriotic Movement	(Ba'athist Syria) Syrian Arab Armed Forces: March 8 Alliance; Hezbollah; SSNP-L; Amal Movement; Marada Movement; Lebanese Ba'ath Party (pro-Syrian faction); Dignity Movement	Lebanese victory: Withdrawal of Syrian troops from Lebanon; Ousting of Karami's pro-Syrian government; Free and democratic parliament elections in spring 2005; Release of political prisoners such as Samir Gaegae
July War (2006)	Hezbollah Allies: Amal; Popular Guard; PFLP-GC; Iran (Ynet report); ICU (U.N. report)	Israel	Inconclusive: The LAF introduced into South Lebanon
Fatah al-Islam Rebellion (2007)	(Lebanon) Lebanese Armed Forces (Lebanon) Internal Security Forces; Supported by: United States	Fatah al-Islam; Jund al-Sham	Victory: Defeat of the militants
May clashes (2008)	Future Movement; Progressive Socialist Party	March 8 Alliance	Anti-government victory: Hezbollah gains a de facto veto in Lebanese parliament; Doha Agreement
Israel–Lebanon border clash (2010)	Lebanon	Israel	Ceasefire: Withdrawal of both armies
Syrian civil war spillover in Lebanon (2011–2017)	Lebanon; Hezbollah	Syrian opposition Hay'at Tahrir al-Sham Islamic State	Victory: Islamist groups expelled from Lebanon
17 October revolution (2019-2021)	Individual protesters and civil society organizations Forces of Change Citizens in a State	Lebanese Government	Limited Achievements: Resignation of Prime Minister Saad Hariri; Resignation of Prime Minister Hassan Diab; Resignation of Members of the 2018–2022 Lebanese Parliament; Election of 13 reformists in the 2022 Lebanese general elections; Inflation of the Lebanese Lira; 2021 Energy crisis
Hezbollah–Israel conflict (2023–present) (2023–ongoing)	Hezbollah Allies: Amal SSNP-L Hamas Palestinian Islamic Jihad Popular Front for the Liberation of Palestine Islamic Resistance in Iraq (Yemen) Houthis Iran Syria (until 2024) Islamic Azz Brigades	Israel	Ongoing: Hezbollah's capabilities severely degraded; Assassination of Hassan Nasrallah, head of Hezbollah Israel and Lebanon agree to a ceasefire on 26 November 2024; Sporadic fighting continues; 2026 Lebanon war between Hezbollah and Israel during the 2026 Iran war and the following assassination of Ali Khamenei; A 10-day truce agreed between Israel and Lebanon, later extended by 3 weeks and again extended for 45 days; Israel maintains an occupation force in parts of Southern Lebanon
2024 Lebanon war (2024)	Hezbollah Allies: Amal Movement Islamic Group SSNP-L (Yemen) Houthi movement Popular Front for the Liberation of Palestine Palestinian Islamic Jihad Islamic Resistance in Iraq; Lebanon (Note: The Lebanese government stated they will stay out of the conflict between Hezbollah and Israel, but would respond to Israeli attacks on their positions.)	Israel UNIFIL (Note: Although UNIFIL is a peacekeeping force and is not actively engaged in hostilities, its positions have been targeted and its peacekeepers have suffered casualties.)	Israeli victory: 2024 Israel–Lebanon ceasefire agreement; Continued Israeli occupation in parts of Southern Lebanon
2026 Lebanon war (2026–ongoing)	Lebanon (Note: Lebanese soldiers have been killed in Israeli drone attacks. The Lebanese army arrested armed Hezbollah members.) (United Nations) UNIFIL (Note: UNIFIL peacekeepers have been attacked by the IDF, and have engaged in a clash with Hezbollah.)	Hezbollah; Amal Movement (Note: The Amal Movement has played an active role in hostilities. Paramedics belonging to the Amal Movement's Islamic Risala Scout Association have been targeted in Israeli airstrikes.); Attacked by Israel: Palestinian Islamic Jihad; Hamas; Islamic Group; Islamic Revolutionary Guard Corps; Israel Attacked by Hezbollah and Israel: Syria (Note: Syria declared its support for the disarmament of Hezbollah following the outbreak of the war. In response, Hezbollah struck Syrian army positions near Damascus. Syrian authorities began closing smuggling routes used by Hezbollah along the Lebanese border. For further information, see Syria in the 2026 Iran war.)	Ongoing De jure Temporary ceasefire: Israeli ground operations in southern Lebanon began on 16 March 2026; Lebanese general elections postponed to 2028

== Other armed conflicts involving Lebanon ==
- 1968 Israeli raid on Lebanon
- 1973 Israeli raid in Lebanon
- Hundred Days' War (part of the Lebanese Civil War)
- 1978 South Lebanon conflict (also known as Operation Litani, part of the Lebanese Civil War)
- Battle of Zahleh (part of the Lebanese Civil War)
- Mountain War (part of the Lebanese Civil War)
- War of the Camps (part of the Lebanese Civil War)
- 1982 Lebanon War (part of the Lebanese Civil War)
- Cedar Revolution 2005 (Attacks linked to the Cedar Revolution)
- 17 October Revolution
- 2023 Ain al-Hilweh clashes
- List of extrajudicial killings and political violence in Lebanon

== Lebanese predecessor states ==
=== Lebanon under Babylon ===
War	Combatant 1	Combatant 2	Result
Siege of Tyre (586–573 BC)	Neo-Babylonian Empire	Kingdom of Tyre	Babylonian victory
Fall of Babylon	Achaemenid Empire	Neo-Babylonian Empire	Achaemenid victory: Fall of the Neo-Babylonian Empire

=== Achaemenid Lebanon ===
War	Combatant 1	Combatant 2	Result
First Achaemenid conquest of Egypt: Battle of Pelusium	Achaemenid Empire; Kingdom of Sidon	Twenty-sixth Dynasty of Egypt	Achaemenid victory: Egypt annexed by the Achaemenid Empire.
Second Persian invasion of Greece: Battle of Salamis	Achaemenid Empire; Kingdom of Sidon	Sparta; Athens; Corinth; Megara; Tegea; Aegina; Other Greek city-states	Achaemenid defeat: Invasion repelled.
Corinthian War: Battle of Cnidus	Athens; Argos; Corinth; Thebes; Achaemenid Empire; Kingdom of Sidon; Other allies	Sparta; Peloponnesian League	Inconclusive; Peace of Antalcidas dictated by the Achaemenid Empire.
Sidonian Rebellion under Abdashtart	Kingdom of Sidon; Athens; Thirtieth Dynasty of Egypt	Achaemenid Empire	Sidonian defeat: Rebellion suppressed.
Sidonian Rebellion under Tennes	Kingdom of Sidon; Thirtieth Dynasty of Egypt	Achaemenid Empire	Sidonian defeat: Rebellion suppressed.
Siege of Tyre (332 BC)	Macedonian Empire; Hellenic League; Cyprus; Ionia; Phoenician city-states of Byblos, Arwad and Sidon	Achaemenid Empire; Kingdom of Tyre	Achaemenid defeat: Sidon and Byblos submit to Alexander the Great.; Macedonian army captures Tyre.

=== Lebanon under Diadochi ===
War	Combatant 1	Combatant 2	Result
Siege of Tyre (314 BC)	Ptolemaic Kingdom	Antigonid dynasty	Antigonid victory: Capture of Tyre.
Syrian Wars	Ptolemaic Kingdom	Seleucid Empire; Macedon	Seleucid victory; Seleucid annexation of Ptolemaic holdings in Asia Minor, Coele-Syria, Cyprus, and other Ptolemaic holdings outside of Egypt; Macedonian annexation of the Cyclades; Second Macedonian War during the Fifth Syrian War; Roman intervention against Seleucids and Macedon during the Sixth Syrian War.
Campaigns of Pompey	Roman Republic	Seleucid Empire	Roman victory

=== Lebanon under Byzantium ===
War	Combatant 1	Combatant 2	Result
Byzantine–Sasanian War of 602–628	Byzantine Empire; Supported by: Ghassanids; Western Turkic Khaganate; Hephthalites; Nobatia	Sasanian Empire; Supported by: Sasanian Iberia; Jewish and Samaritan rebels; Lakhmids; Principality of Iberia; Avars; Sclaveni; Makuria; Eastern Turkic Khaganate	Byzantine victory: Status quo ante bellum
Muslim conquest of Syria	Rashidun Caliphate	Byzantine Empire; Ghassanids; Tanukhids; Banu Judham; Banu Lakhm	Muslim victory: Annexation of Byzantine Syria by the Rashidun Caliphate.

=== Lebanon under the Maronite state ===
War	Combatant 1	Combatant 2	Result
Battle of Amioun	Maronites; Supported by: Mardaites	Byzantine Empire	Maronite victory: Establishment of the Maronite state
Mount Lebanon revolts of 752 and 759	Maronites; Supported by: Mardaites; Melkites; Byzantine Empire	Abbasid Caliphate; Supported by: Tanukhids; Lakhmids	Abbasid victory: Maronites become centralized around Northern Mount Lebanon; Christian inhabitants of parts of interior and coastal Lebanon expelled and replaced with Arab tribes

=== Lebanon under Crusaders (Note: Includes battles of the County of Tripoli and conflicts in the cities of Beirut, Tyre, Sidon etc.) ===
War	Combatant 1	Combatant 2	Result
Siege of Tripoli (1102 - 1109)	Kingdom of Jerusalem; Principality of Antioch; County of Edessa; County of Toulouse; County of Cerdanya; Republic of Genoa	Banu Ammar Emirate of Tripoli; Seljuk Empire; Fatimid Caliphate	Crusader victory: Tripoli is captured, becomes the capital of the County of Tripoli.
Battle of the Dog River	County of Edessa	Seljuks of Damascus	Crusader victory
Siege of Beirut (1110)	Kingdom of Jerusalem; County of Toulouse; Republic of Genoa; Republic of Pisa	Fatimid Caliphate	Crusader victory: Lordship of Beirut was created.
Siege of Sidon (1110)	Kingdom of Jerusalem; Republic of Venice (Kingdom of Norway (872–1397)) Kingdom of Norway	Fatimid Caliphate	Crusader victory: Lordship of Sidon was created.
Seljuk campaign on Edessa (1110)	Kingdom of Jerusalem; County of Tripoli; Principality of Antioch; County of Edessa; Raban and Kaysun	Seljuk Empire: Emirate of Mosul; Shah-Armens; Artuqids of Mardin; Burid dynasty	Stalemate: Seljuk inconclusive victory against Crusaders in Euphrates.; Seljuk failure in capturing Edessa.
Seljuk campaign on the Crusaders (1111)	Kingdom of Jerusalem; County of Tripoli; Principality of Antioch; County of Edessa; Lordship of Turbessel	Seljuk Empire: Emirate of Mosul; Rawwadid dynasty; Shah-Armens; Hadhabanis of Erbil; Artuqids of Mardin; Beykeji tribes; Bursuqid dynasty; Burid dynasty; Banu Munqidh	Stalemate: Crusader withdrawal in the Battle of Shaizar (1111).; Seljuk failure in achieving any real accomplishment.
Siege of Tyre (1111–1112)	Kingdom of Jerusalem; Byzantine Empire	Fatimid Caliphate; Burid dynasty	Crusader defeat: Crusader withdrawal.
Battle of Hab (1119)	Kingdom of Jerusalem; County of Tripoli; Principality of Antioch	Artuqids of Aleppo and Mardin	Crusader victory
Venetian Crusade	Republic of Venice; Kingdom of Jerusalem; County of Tripoli	Fatimid Caliphate; Seljuk Empire; Burid dynasty	Crusader victory: Tyre ceded to Jerusalem.
Battle of Azaz (1125)	Kingdom of Jerusalem; County of Tripoli; Principality of Antioch; County of Edessa; Armenian Kingdom of Cilicia	Seljuk Empire: Emirate of Mosul; Artuqids; Burid dynasty	Crusader victory
Battle of Beirut (1126)	Kingdom of Jerusalem	Fatimid Caliphate	Crusader victory
Battle of Rafaniyya (1133)	Kingdom of Jerusalem; County of Tripoli	Zengid dynasty	Crusader defeat
Crusade of 1129	Kingdom of Jerusalem; County of Tripoli; Principality of Antioch; County of Edessa	Burid dynasty	Crusader defeat: Crusaders take Banias.
Battle of Qinnasrin (1135)	County of Tripoli	Zengid dynasty	Crusader defeat
Battle of Ba'rin (1137)	Kingdom of Jerusalem; County of Tripoli	Zengid dynasty	Crusader defeat
Battle of Tripoli (1137)	County of Tripoli	Emirate of Damascus	Crusader defeat: Execution of Pons, Count of Tripoli.
Battle of Harim	County of Tripoli; Principality of Antioch; Byzantine Empire; Armenian Kingdom of Cilicia	Zengids of Aleppo; Zengids of Mosul	Crusader defeat
Crusader invasions of Egypt	Kingdom of Jerusalem; County of Tripoli; Principality of Antioch; Byzantine Empire; Armenian Kingdom of Cilicia; Knights Hospitaller; Knights Templar; French crusaders Forces and Supporters of Shawar	Zengid dynasty Fatimid Caliphate	Crusader defeat: Crusaders withdraw from Egypt.; Later establishment of the Ayyubid dynasty.; Egypt seized by the Zengids.; The Fatimids become a vassal state of the Zengids
Battle of al-Buqaia (1163)	Kingdom of Jerusalem; County of Tripoli; Principality of Antioch; Byzantine Empire	Zengid dynasty	Crusader victory
Battle of Marj Ayyun	Kingdom of Jerusalem; Knights Templar	Ayyubid Sultanate	Crusader defeat
Battle of Hattin	Kingdom of Jerusalem; County of Tripoli; Knights Templar; Principality of Antioch; Knights Hospitaller; Order of St. Lazarus; Order of Mountjoy	Ayyubid Sultanate	Crusader defeat
Siege of Jerusalem (1187)	Kingdom of Jerusalem; County of Tripoli; Knights Templar; Knights Hospitaller; Order of St. Lazarus; Order of Mountjoy	Ayyubid Sultanate	Crusader defeat: Jerusalem surrendered and restored to the Muslims.
Siege of Tyre (1187)	Kingdom of Jerusalem: Lordship of Sidon; Knights Templar	Ayyubid Sultanate	Crusader victory: Siege lifted.
Siege of Toron (1197–1198)	Holy Roman Empire; Kingdom of Jerusalem	Ayyubid Sultanate	Crusader defeat
Battle of Machghara (1217)	Kingdom of Hungary	Ayyubid Sultanate	Crusader defeat
Fall of Beaufort Castle (1268)	Knights Templar	Mamluk Sultanate	Crusader defeat
Siege of Tripoli (1271)	County of Tripoli	Mamluk Sultanate	Inconclusive
Fall of Tripoli (1289)	County of Tripoli; Knights Templar; Knights Hospitaller; Republic of Genoa	Mamluk Sultanate	Crusader defeat: Tripoli taken by the Mamluk Sultanate.
