= Military history of Syria =

The List as follows. This includes the Syrian civil war and so on.

== Antiquity ==
- Military history of the Assyrian Empire
- Military history of Persia
- Sassanid army

List of battles with the Roman:

- Siege of Apamea – 45 BC – 44 BC – Caesar's civil war
- Battle of Mount Gindarus – 38 BC – Pompeian–Parthian invasion of 40 BC (Roman–Parthian Wars)
- Battle of Resaena – 243 – Roman–Persian Wars
- Battle of Barbalissos – 252 – Roman–Persian Wars
- Siege of Dura-Europos (256) – 256 – Roman–Persian Wars
- Sack of Bostra – 270 – Crisis of the Third Century
- Battle of Emesa – 272 – Crisis of the Third Century
- Battle of Thannuris – 528 – Iberian War
- Battle of Callinicum – 531 – Iberian War

== Middle Ages ==
- Islamic conquest of Persia
- 1251–1259 Mongol invasion of Persia, Syria and Mesopotamia
- Growth of the Ottoman Empire, Selim I

Civil wars of the early Caliphates

- Battle of Siffin – 657 – First Fitna
- Battle of Marj Rahit (684) – 684 – Second Fitna
- Battle of Ayn al-Warda – 685 – Second Fitna

List of battles in Syria during the Muslim conquest of the Levant (Arab–Byzantine wars):

- Battle of Marj Rahit (634)
- Battle of al-Qaryatayn – 634
- Battle of Bosra – 634
- Battle of Marj al-Saffar (634)
- Siege of Damascus (634)
- Battle of Maraj-al-Debaj – 634
- Battle of Marj ar-Rum – 635
- Siege of Emesa – 635 – 636
- Battle of the Yarmuk – 636
- Siege of Laodicea (636) – 636
- Battle of Hazir – 637
- Siege of Aleppo (637)
- Siege of Emesa (638)

Arab–Byzantine wars:

- Sack of Aleppo (962) – 962
- Battle of the Orontes – 994
- Siege of Aleppo (994–995) – 994 – 995
- Battle of Apamea – 998
- Battle of Azaz (1030) – 1030

List of battles in Syria during the Crusades:

- Siege of Ma'arra – 1098 – First Crusade
- Battle of Shaizar – 1111
- Battle of Sarmin – 1115
- Battle of Ager Sanguinis – 1119
- Battle of Hab – 1119
- Siege of Aleppo (1124 = 1125)
- Battle of Azaz (1125)
- Battle of Marj al-Saffar (1126)
- Battle of al-Atharib (1130)
- Battle of Rafaniyya – 1133
- Battle of Qinnasrin – 1135
- Battle of Ba'rin – 1137
- Siege of Aleppo (1138)
- Siege of Shaizar
- Battle of Bosra (1147) – 1147
- Siege of Damascus (1148) – 1148 – Second Crusade
- Battle of Inab – 1149
- Battle of Harim – 1164
- Fall of Krak des Chevaliers – 1271
- Fall of Ruad – 1302

List of battles during the Mongol invasions of the Levant:

- First Battle of Homs – 1260
- Second Battle of Homs – 1281
- Battle of Wadi al-Khaznadar – 1299
- Battle of Marj al-Saffar (1303) – 1303

Timurid conquests and invasions:

- Sack of Aleppo (1400)
- Siege of Damascus (1400)

Ottoman–Mamluk War (1516–1517) (Ottoman wars in Asia):

- Battle of Marj Dabiq – 1516

== Modern ==
- French Mandate of Syria
- 1948 Arab–Israeli War
- Six-Day War
- Yom Kippur War (part of the Golan Heights conflict)
- Syrian occupation of Lebanon
- 1982 Lebanon War
- Syrian Revolution
- Syrian civil war
- Aftermath of the Syrian civil war

== Sources ==
- The Middle East: 2000 Years of History From The Rise of Christianity to the Present Day, Bernard Lewis, London: Weidenfeld & Nicolson, 1995.
- Qajar Studies: War and Peace in the Qajar Era, Journal of the Qajar Studies Association, London: 2005.

== See also ==
- History of Syria
- Military of Syria
