= Battle of Beirut =

Beirut in Lebanon has been the site of several battles in history.

- Siege of Beirut (1110), a battle during the Crusades.
- Battle of Beirut (1126), a battle during the Crusades.
- Battle of Beirut (1383), a battle between the Mamluks and Genoese.
- Battle of Beirut (1520), a battle between the French and Ottomans.
- Battle of Beirut (1840), a battle during the Egyptian–Ottoman War (1839–1841).
- Battle of Beirut (1912), a naval battle during the Italo-Turkish War.
- Battle of Beirut (1941), a battle over control of the city during World War II.
- Siege of Beirut (1982), a siege by Israel during the 1982 Lebanon War.
