= Siege of Hama =

Siege of Hama may refer to:

- Battle of Hamath
- Siege of Hama (1130)
- 1964 Hama riot
- 1982 Hama massacre
- Siege of Hama (2011)
