= Siege of Apamea =

Military action in 45–44 BC

Date	45–44 BC
Location	Apamea, Syria 37.0667°N 37.8836°E
Result	Pompeian victory

Belligerents
Caesarians; Kingdom of Judea	Pompeians; Parthia; Arabs

Commanders and leaders
Lucius Statius Murcus; Quintus Marcius Crispus	Quintus Caecilius Bassus; Deiotarus

Strength
3 Legions (Approximately 10,000–15,000 men); Jewish Contingent	1–2 Legions (Approximately 5,000–10,000 men); Slaves, Galatians, Parthians, Jewish opponents of Antipater

Casualties and losses
Unknown	Unknown

The siege of Apamea was an abortive siege of Apamea in Roman Syria. Lucius Statius Murcus and Quintus Marcius Crispus led the attempt to capture the city, the equestrian Quintus Caecilius Bassus led its defence.

== Prelude ==
Following Julius Caesar's victories in the east during the civil war, he set about establishing his administration in the eastern provinces. He appointed Cleopatra client king of Egypt. He next reaffirmed relations with the Kingdoms of Galatia and Cappadocia through their kings Ariobarzanes and Deiotarus, allowing them to remain kings despite previously supporting Pompey in the Civil War. Finally, Caesar dealt with Syria by appointing his cousin, Sextus Julius Caesar as governor of the province.

The following year, a Pompeian equite by the name of Quintus Caecilius Bassus, who had fought at the Battle of Pharsalus, spread a rumour that Caesar had been defeated and killed in Africa. In this way, Bassus gained a following among the local aristocracy and soldiers, who started a large-scale revolt. Caesar was at this time occupied with a revolt led by the sons of Gnaeus Pompeius Magnus, Sextus and Gnaeus. Unable to directly confront the Syrian revolt, Caesar sent reinforcements instead. Bassus meanwhile had managed to capture the city of Tyre, in modern-day Lebanon, and established it as his base of operations. Despite this early success, Bassus was soon wounded in a pitched battle by Sextus, using his reinforcements from Caesar. but managed to escape the battle on horseback and fled to the province of Cilicia, in modern-day Turkey. He continued his revolt against Sextus, however, and encouraged mutinies and revolts in Syria, one of which resulted in Sextus being killed. Sextus was replaced with acting governor Quintus Cornificius.

The death of Sextus put the province into disarray and paved the way for Bassus to grab power. He assembled an army of slaves, vassals, regional kinglets, Parthians, and the Jewish opposition of Antipater of Idumea, including the Galatian Tetrarch, Deiotarus. Bassus then invaded Syria, meeting little resistance and capturing the majority of the province. He placed himself as acting governor, with his own government, administration, and military forces (militia). By now, Caesar had sent reinforcements under Gaius Antistio Veto, who was to replace Cornificius; Veto arrived shortly thereafter and was received cordially by Cornificius. Vetus's army besieged a city loyal to Bassus, and was initially successful, even being hailed as imperator by the troops. However, the Parthian prince Pacorus I and an old ally of the Parthians, the Arabian king Alcaudonius, attacked and drove the Caesarians away from the city, badly bloodied. Caesar immediately ordered another campaign to finally bring Bassus to heel.

== Siege ==
In the later part of 45 BC, Caesar ordered a new campaign led by Lucius Statius Murcus and Quintus Marcius Crispus. They were further reinforced by a substantial force sent by the king of Judea, Antipater. Bassus retreated to his stronghold of Apamea, on the banks of the river Orontes. We know little of the siege itself, but upon arriving at the city, they established a siege camp. The town was heavily fortified and could not be assaulted directly. As a result, the two Roman commanders decided to besiege it, until the city was starved into submission. The siege continued into 44 BC, when news of the assassination of Caesar arrived. Despite the news, the siege continued until one of Caesar's key assassins, Gaius Cassius Longinus, arrived and killed the Senate's replacement for Vetus, Publius Cornelius Dolabella, at Laodicea. When Cassius arrived at the siege, he offered Bassus and Murcus amnesty to put an end to the siege, although this mercy was not extended to Crispus. This siege was one of the last engagements in Caesar's Civil War.

== Aftermath ==
With the end of the siege, Murcus was given command of the fleet, while Crispus went to govern Bithynia before being stripped of the role by Cassius and probably retiring from public life. Bassus meanwhile disappeared from history and is never mentioned again. He may have fought for Cassius and Marcus Junius Brutus before being killed by Augustus and Mark Antony. The remains of this conflict climaxed in the Liberators' Civil War, in which the former Caesarians, led by Augustus, Antony, and Marcus Aemilius Lepidus, fought the former Pompeians and assassins of Caesar, led by Cassius and Brutus. The war was ultimately concluded with the Battle of Philippi, and both Cassius and Brutus committed suicide when the battle was lost. Relations between Augustus and Antony broke down, and another civil war occurred, which was won by Augustus, led by the general Agrippa at the Battle of Actium. Antony committed suicide in Egypt, and Augustus became master of the Roman republic and eventually its first emperor, thus ushering in a new period in Roman history.

== Sources ==
- Julius Caesar, Commentarii de Bello Civili 2.40
- Cassius Dio . Roman history . Book 43. Digitized by UChicago . Based on Loeb Classical Library edition volume 3, Ancient Greek-English translation by Earnest Cary, 1924.
- Goldsworthy, Adrian (2006). "XXI". Caesar: Life of a Colossus. New Haven: Yale Press. p. 466.
- Appian . Book 2 of The Civil Wars . Volume 14 of Roman History . Digitized by Perseus . Based on Ancient Greek-English translation by Horace White, London: MacMillan & Co., 1899. pdf
- Canfora, Luciano (2006). Giulio Cesare. Il democratic dittatore. Rome: Laterza.
- Knoblet, Jerry (2005). Herod the Great . University Press of America.
- Usher, James (2003). The Annals of the World . New Leaf Publishing Group.
- Cicero, Marcus Tullius. Cicero De Officiis. London : New York :W. Heinemann; The Macmillan Co., 1913.
- Strabo, Geography 5.3.6. Digital version in Perseus Digital Library online: A. Meineke (ed.), Strabonis Geographica: recognovit Augustus Meineke., Lipsiae, 1877.
