= Zengid campaign against Antioch =

12th c. military conflict

| Date | 1135 |
| Location | Syria |
| Result | Zengid victory: Zengids capture Atharib, Zardana, Tell Aghdi, Ma’arat al-Nu’man, Ma’arrat Misrin and Kafartab |

Belligerents
| Zengids | Principality of Antioch |

Commanders and leaders
| Imad al-Din Zengi | Constance of Antioch |

Strength
| Unknown | Unknown |

Casualties and losses
| Unknown | Unknown |

The Zengid campaign against Antioch occurred in 1135 when Imad al-Din Zengi staged a successful campaign against the Principality of Antioch.

In 1135 Imad al-Din Zengi conducted a major campaign against the Principality of Antioch. While his lieutenant Sawar threatened Turbessel, Aintab and Azaz, Zengi swept past the eastern frontier.

Zengi inflicted major defeats against Antioch, capturing Atharib, Zardana, Tell Aghdi, Ma’arat al-Nu’man, Ma’arrat Misrin and Kafartab. He captured them one by one.

Following this successful campaign against Antioch, the count of Tripoli attempted to block the road that crossed Syria from north to south and launched an offensive against Qinnasrin, however Zengi repelled this attack in the Battle of Qinnasrin.
