= Militia of Jesus Christ =

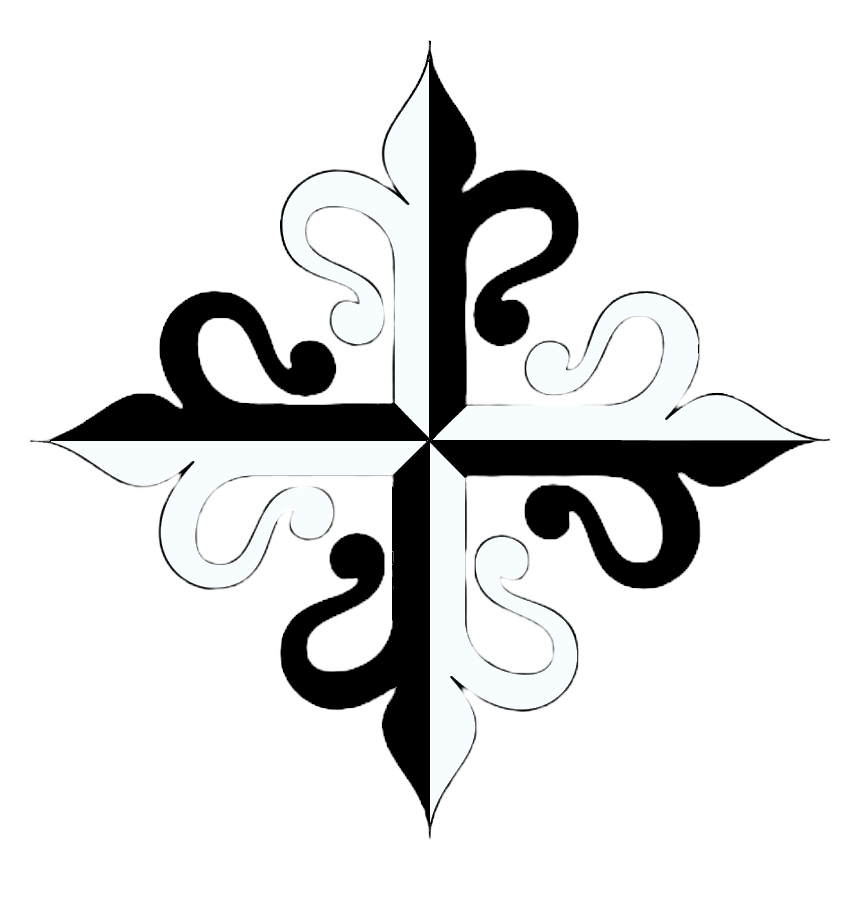
Militia of Jesus Christ insignia

The Militia of Jesus Christ (Latin: Mīlitia Jēsū Chrīstī) (Italian: Milizia di Gesù Cristo) was a military order in Lombardy during the High Middle Ages. It was founded at Parma by Bartholomew, Bishop of Vicenza, a Dominican, in 1233 and approved by Pope Gregory IX, who gave it a rule in 1234 and placed under the jurisdiction of the Dominicans. Its chief purpose was to combat what the Catholic Church viewed as heresy, like Catharism and Waldensianism, and to strengthen the bond between the Roman Church and the local nobility. In imitation of the Order of Santiago, members of the Militia did not take a vow of chastity, nor did they live communally or in poverty.

The membership in turn was divided into two classes: the high-born urban nobility and the bourgeoisie. The urban nature of the militia meant an emphasis on helping the weak and disadvantaged in the cities. Members were required to perform confession thrice annually (at Easter, Christmas, and Pentecost) and acts of liturgical devotion daily or hourly. There were monthly meetings for the biblical instruction of the membership, conducted by Dominican friars. The knights of the order even wore the white tunic and black cloak of the Dominicans.

The head officer of the Militia was the master general, who decided in what military operations members could participate when called upon by either the pope or the local bishop. The Militia was active chiefly in the vicinity of Parma, but disappears from the record after 1261, when a new order, the Order of the Blessed Virgin Mary, takes over its role.

There is some confusion between the Militia founded in Lombardy in 1233 and the institution called the Militia of the Faith of Jesus Christ, a penitential order, founded by Dominic himself to combat the Cathars in southern France at the height of the Albigensian Crusade. It should also not be confused with a modern "revival" called the Militia Jesu Christi, which sees itself as the continuation of Dominic's foundation, with the canonical ecclesiastical standing as an association of the faithful.

== Bibliography ==
- Crawford, Paul (2004). "Military Orders in Italy." Medieval Italy: An Encyclopedia, ed. Christopher Kleinhenz (New Jersey: Routledge University Press), pp. 720–22. ISBN 0-415-93930-5.
- Vincent, Catherine (2001). "Militia of Jesus Christ." Encyclopedia of the Middle Ages (New Jersey: Routledge University Press), pp. 953–54. ISBN 1-57958-282-6.
