= Imad al-Din Zengi =

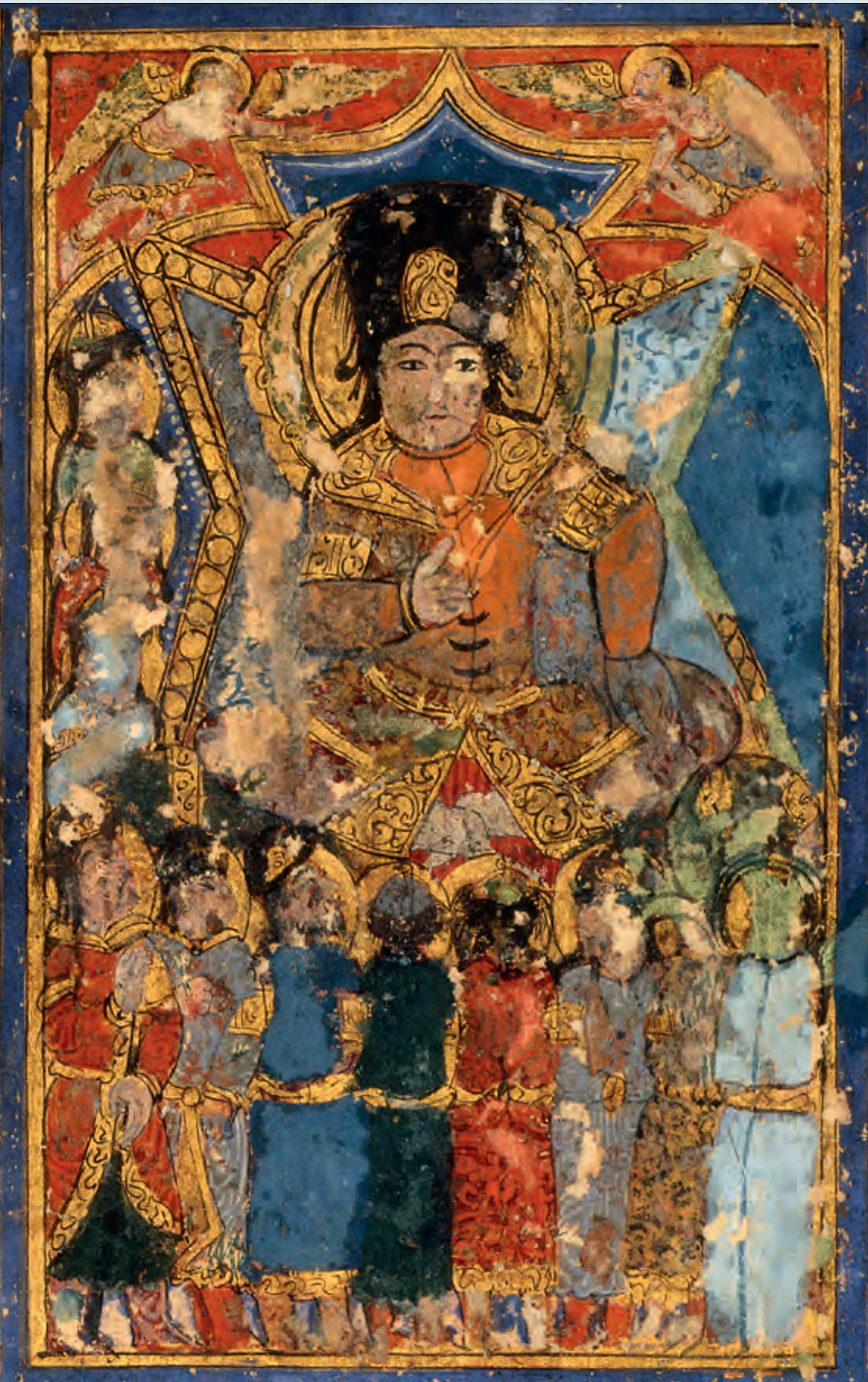
- Ruler in Turkic military dress: long braids, sharbush fur hat, boots, close-fitting coat. Maqamat by Al-Hariri of Basra (1054–1122), a high government official of the Seljuks. Mesopotamia, possibly Baghdad, 1237 copy.

Atabeg of Mosul
- Reign: 1127 – 1146
- Predecessor: Aqsunqur al-Bursuqi
- Successor: Sayf al-Din Ghazi I

Atabeg of Aleppo
- Reign: 1128 – 1146
- Predecessor: Badr al-Dawla Suleiman
- Successor: Nur al-Din Zengi

Emir of Wasit and Basra
- Reign: 1122/1124 – 1146
- Predecessor: Sayf al-Din Ghazi I

Emir of Edessa
- Reign: 1144 – 1146
- Predecessor: Joscelin II (as Count of Edessa)
- Successor: Nur al-Din Zengi

Emir of Hama
- Reign: 1130 – 1146
- Predecessor: Taj al-Muluk Buri
- Successor: Nur al-Din Zengi

Shihna of Baghdad
- Reign: 1126 – 1127
- Predecessor: Baran-Qush Zakawi
- Born: c. 1084/88 (Note: "According to Heidemann, Zengi was born in Aleppo in 1087/8, although Christie gives the date as 1084. This difference of opinion calls for some discussion here. Ibn al-Athir mentions that, ‘When Aq Sunqur was killed, he left one son, Zengi, who was a young boy of about ten years old’. This took place in 1094, which means that Zengi was born around 1084, some four years earlier than widely believed. Yet, most modern studies have consistently supported Heidemann’s view."); Aleppo, Seljuk Empire
- Died: September 14, 1146 (aged 61); Qal'at Ja'bar, Seljuk Empire
- Spouse: Zumurrud Khatun; Sukmana Khatun; Safiya Khatun
Names
- Imad al-Din Atabeg Zengi al-Malik al-Mansur
- Dynasty: Zengid dynasty
- Father: Aq Sunqur al-Hajib
- Religion: Sunni Islam
- Military career
- Conflicts: Siege of Hama (1130); Battle of al-Atharib (1130); Battle of Rafaniyya; Zengid campaign against Antioch; Battle of Qinnasrin; Battle of Ba'rin; Siege of Aleppo (1138); Siege of Shaizar; Siege of Baalbek; Siege of Edessa (1144); Fall of Saruj

Al-Malik al-Mansur Abu al-Mudhaffar Imad al-Din Zengi bin Aq Sunqur al-Hajib bin Abdullah (Arabic: المَلِكُ المَنْصُور أَبُو المُظَفَّرِ عِمَادُ اَلدِّينِ زَنْكِي بْنُ آقِ سَنقَر الحَاجِب بْنِ عَبْدِ الله ; c. 1084/88 – 14 September 1146), also romanized as Zangi, Zengui, Zenki, and Zanki, was a Turkoman atabeg of the Seljuk Empire, who ruled Mosul, Aleppo, Hama, and, later, Edessa. He was the namesake and founder of the Zengid dynasty of atabegs.

== Early life ==
Zengi's father, Aq Sunqur al-Hajib, was Turkic governor of Aleppo under the Seljuk ruler Malik-Shah I. He was beheaded by Tutush I for treason in 1094. At the time, Zengi was about 10 years old and was brought up by Kerbogha, the governor of Mosul. Zengi then served in the military of the governors of Mosul, first under Jawali Saqawa (1106–1109), then Mawdud (1109–1113), and from 1114, under Aqsunqur al-Bursuqi.

Zengi remained in Mosul until 1118, when he entered into the service of the new Seljuk ruler Mahmūd (1118–1119). Upon Sanjar's accession in 1119, Zengi remained loyal to Mahmūd, who became ruler of the Iraqi Seljuk Sultānate (1119–1131).

== Seljuk governor of Iraq ==
The region of Mesopotamia was under the control of the Seljuk Empire from 1055 to 1135, since Tughril Beg had expelled the Shi'ite Buyid dynasty. Tughril Beg was the first Seljuk ruler to style himself sultan and protector of the Abbasid Caliphate. Mesopotamia remained under the control of the Great Seljuks during the reign of Muhammad I Tapar (1082–1118), but from 1119, his 14 years old son Mahmud II (1118–1131) was restricted to the only rule of Iraq, while Sanjar took control of the rest of the Empire.

Wishing to contain the Banu Mazyad leader Dubays ibn Sadaqa, in 1122 Mahmūd II ordered a military expedition from Mosul to southern Iraq, commanded by Zengi and Altun-Tash al-Aburi under the orders of Aqsunqur al-Bursuqi. Zengi, for whom this was the first major military command, garrisoned his troops around Wasit, and was granted governorship of the region of Wasit as an Iqta'. In alliance with the troops of the caliphate, they defeated Dubays at the battle of Mubarraqiyya in 1123. Zengi then received in addition to his previous responsibilities the military governorship of Basra in 1124.

In order to counter the ambitions of Abbasid Caliph al-Mustarshid (1118–1135), who wanted to acquire world dominance, the Seljuks led by Mahmud II now waged a campaign against him. With some decisive leadership from Zengi, the Seljuks managed to take control of Baghdad and the caliphate, pillaging the caliph's palace. The caliph sued for peace and had to pay a huge ransom. In addition to his possessions in Wasit and Basra, Zengi was promoted and received the governorship of Baghdad in April 1126, receiving the title of shihna effectively putting him in control of the whole of Seljuk Iraq. In 1127, following the assassination of Aqsunqur al-Bursuqi, Zengi was named governor of Mosul, where the Atabegdom of Mosul was formed.

== Atabeg of Mosul and Aleppo ==
Following the death in 1128 of Toghtekin, atabeg of Damascus, a power vacuum threatened to open Syria to renewed Crusader aggression. Zengi became atabeg of Mosul in 1127 and of Aleppo in 1128, uniting the two cities under his personal rule, and was formally invested as their ruler by the Seljuk Sultan Mahmud II. He installed Sawar ibn Aytegin as governor of Aleppo. Zengi had supported the young sultan against his rival, the caliph al-Mustarshid.

=== Zengi against Damascus ===
In 1130 Zengi allied with Taj al-Mulk Buri of Damascus against the Crusaders, but this was only a ruse to extend his power; he had Buri's son taken prisoner and seized Hama from him. Zengi also besieged Homs, the governor of which was accompanying him at the time, but could not capture it, so he returned to Mosul, where Buri's son and the other prisoners from Damascus were ransomed for 50,000 dinars. The next year, Zengi agreed to return the 50,000 dinars if Buri would deliver to him Dubays ibn Sadaqa, emir of al-Hilla in Iraq, who had fled to Damascus to escape al-Mustarshid. When an ambassador from the caliph arrived to bring Dubays back, Zengi attacked him and killed some of his retinue; the ambassador returned to Baghdad without Dubays.

Mahmud II died in 1131, setting off a war for the succession. As the Seljuk princes were occupied fighting one another in Persia, Zengi marched on Baghdad to add it to his dominions. He was defeated by the caliph's troops, however, and only escaped thanks to the help of the governor of Tikrit, Najm al-Din Ayyub. Several years later, Zengi would reward the governor with a position in his army, paving the way for Saladin's brilliant career.

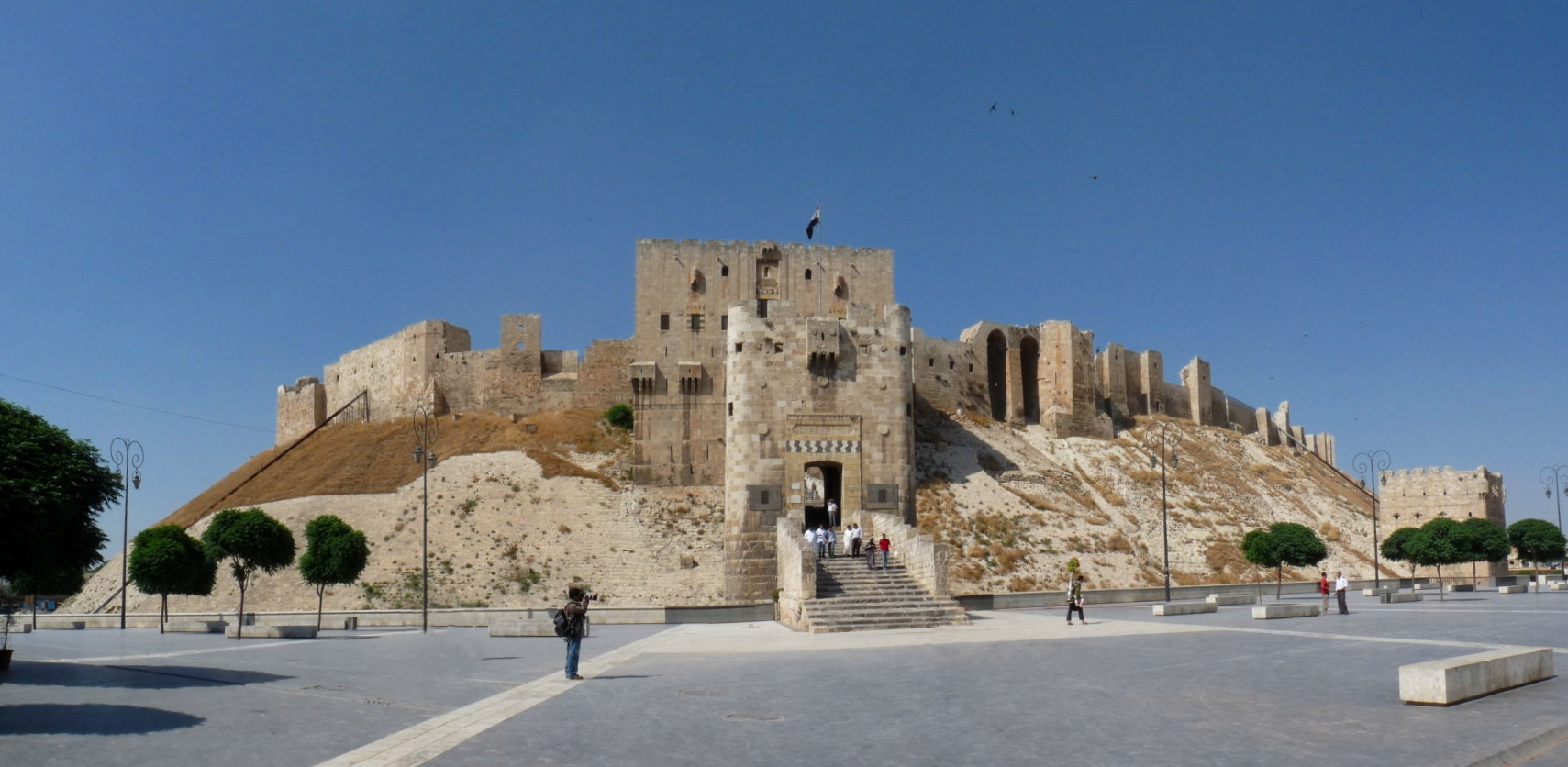
The Citadel of Aleppo was fortified by the Zengids during the Crusades. Imad al-Din Zengi, followed by his son Nur al-Din (ruled 1147–1174), unified Aleppo and Damascus and held back the Crusaders from their repeated assaults on the cities.

In 1134 Zengi became involved in Artuqid affairs, allying with the emir Timurtash (son of Ilghazi) against Timurtash's cousin Rukn al-Dawla Da'ud. Zengi's real desires, however, lay to the south, in Damascus. In 1135 Zengi received an appeal for help from Shams ul-Mulk Isma'il, who had succeeded his father Buri as emir of Damascus, and who was in fear for his life from his own citizenry, who considered him a cruel tyrant. Ismail was willing to surrender the city to Zengi in order to restore peace. None of Isma'il's family or advisors wanted this, however, and Isma'il was murdered by his own mother, Zumurrud, to prevent him from turning over the city to Zengi's control. Isma'il was succeeded by his brother Shihab al-Din Mahmud.

Zengi was not discouraged by this turn of events and arrived at Damascus anyway, still intending to seize it. The siege lasted for some time with no success on Zengi's part, so a truce was made and Shahib al-Din's brother Bahram-Shah was given as a hostage. At the same time, news of the siege had reached the caliph and Baghdad, and a messenger was sent with orders for Zengi to leave Damascus and take control of the governance of Iraq. The messenger was ignored, but Zengi gave up the siege, as per the terms of the truce with Shihab al-Din. On the way back to Aleppo, Zengi besieged Homs, whose governor had angered him, and Shihab al-Din responded to the city's call for help by sending Mu'in al-Din Unur to govern it.

== War against Crusaders and Byzantine Empire ==
Territories of Zengi in 1146 (in green )

In 1137 Imad al-Din Zengi besieged Homs again, but Mu'in al-Din Unur successfully defended it. In response, Damascus allied with the Crusader Kingdom of Jerusalem against him.

In the Battle of Ba'rin (also known as Battle of Montferrand) in 1137, a Crusader force commanded by King Fulk of Jerusalem was scattered and defeated by Zengi, by that time atabeg of Mosul and Aleppo. This setback resulted in the permanent loss of the Crusader castle of Montferrand in Baarin. Crusader King Fulk agreed to surrender and was allowed to flee with his surviving troops.

=== War against the Byzantine–Crusader alliance ===
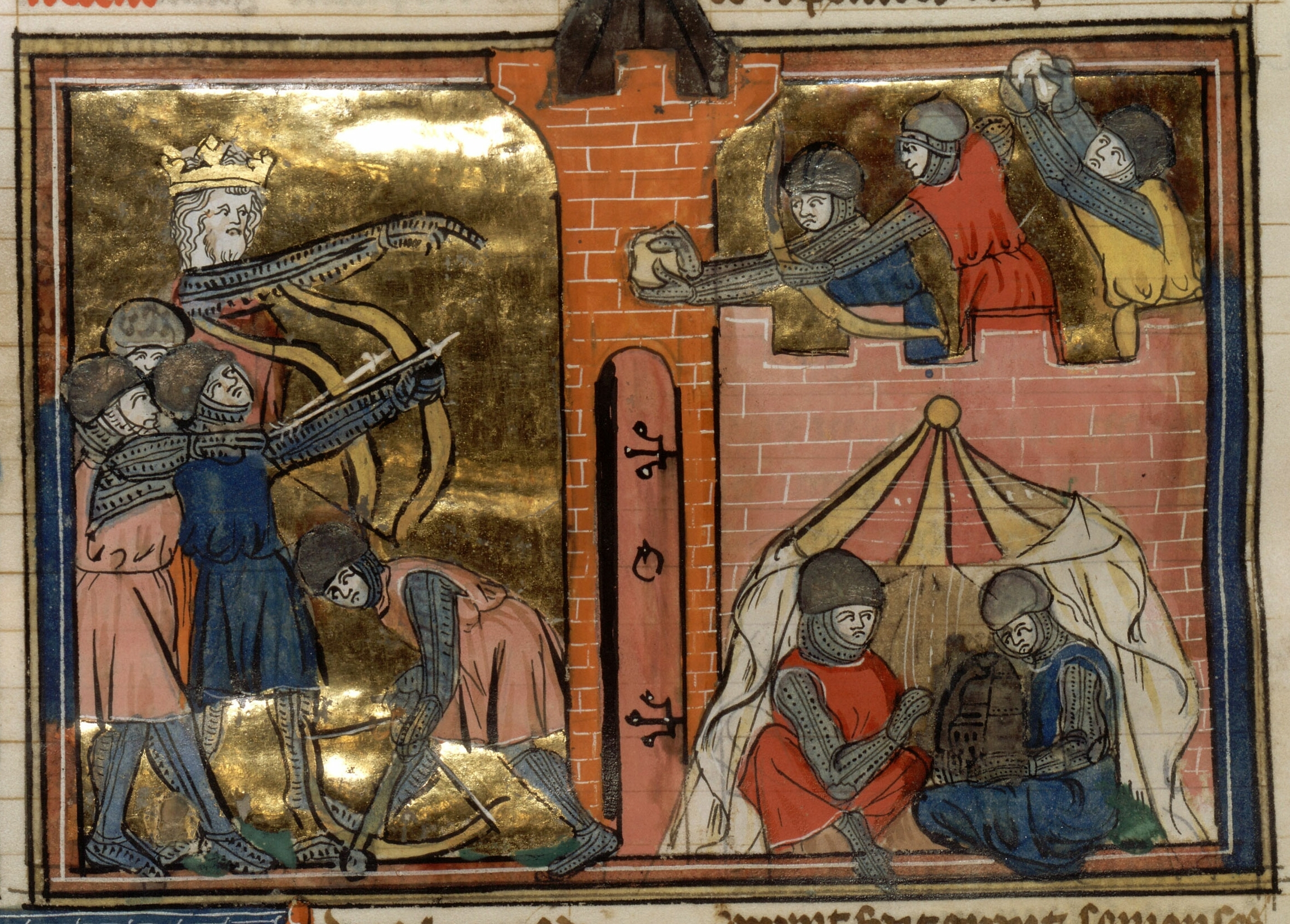
Emperor John II directs the unsuccessful Siege of Shaizar against Zengid territory, French manuscript, 1338

Zengi, realizing that this new expedition against Damascus was bound to fail, made peace with Shihab al-Din, just in time to be confronted at Aleppo by an army sent by the Byzantine Emperor John II Comnenus. The Emperor had recently brought the Crusader Principality of Antioch under Byzantine control, and had allied himself with Joscelin II of Edessa and Raymond of Antioch. Facing a combined Byzantine–Crusader threat, Zengi mobilized his forces and recruited assistance from other Muslim leaders. In April 1138 the armies of the Byzantine emperor and the Crusader princes laid siege to Shaizar, but they were turned back by Zengi's forces a month later.

=== Siege of Baalbek ===
In May 1138 Zengi came to an agreement with Damascus. He married Zumurrud Khatun, the same woman who had murdered her son Ismail, and received Homs as her dowry. In July 1139 Zumurrud's surviving son, Shihab al-Din, was assassinated, and Zengi marched on Damascus to take possession of the city. The Damascenes, united under Mu'in al-Din Unur, acting as regent for Shihab al-Din's successor Jamal al-Din, once again allied with Jerusalem to repel Zengi. Zengi also besieged Jamal al-Din's former possession of Baalbek, and Mu'in al-Din was in charge of its defenses as well. Zengi obtained its surrender in response to a promise of safe passage; he did not honor it, ordering that the defenders be crucified. Unlike Saladin at Jerusalem in 1187, Zengi did not keep his word to protect his captives at Baalbek in 1139. According to Ibn al-‘Adim, Zengi "had sworn to the people of the citadel with strong oaths and on the Qur’an and divorcing (his wives). When they came down from the citadel he betrayed them, flayed its governor and hanged the rest." He granted the territory to his lieutenant Najm al-Din Ayyub, father of Saladin. After Zengi abandoned his siege of Damascus, Jamal al-Din died of a disease and was succeeded by his son Mujir al-Din, with Mu'in al-Din remaining as regent.

=== Expansion and conflict with Armenia ===
Mu'in al-Din signed a new peace treaty with Jerusalem for their mutual protection against Zengi. While Mu'in al-Din and the crusaders joined together to besiege Banias in 1140, Zengi once more laid siege to Damascus, but quickly abandoned it again. There were no major engagements between the crusaders, Damascus, and Zengi for the next few years, but Zengi in the meantime campaigned in the north and captured Ashib and the Armenian fortress of Hizan.

=== Conquest of Edessa ===
In late 1144, Zengi learned through intelligence that Joscelin II, Count of Edessa had left the County of Edessa with an army to aid Zengi's northern enemy Kara Arslan. He subsequently left his Armenian campaign and began the siege of Edessa in November. Zengi captured it on December 24, 1144, after a siege of four months. The County of Edessa was the first of the original crusader states to be created and the first to fall. This event led to the Second Crusade, and later Muslim chroniclers noted it as the start of the jihad against the Crusader states.

== Death and legacy ==
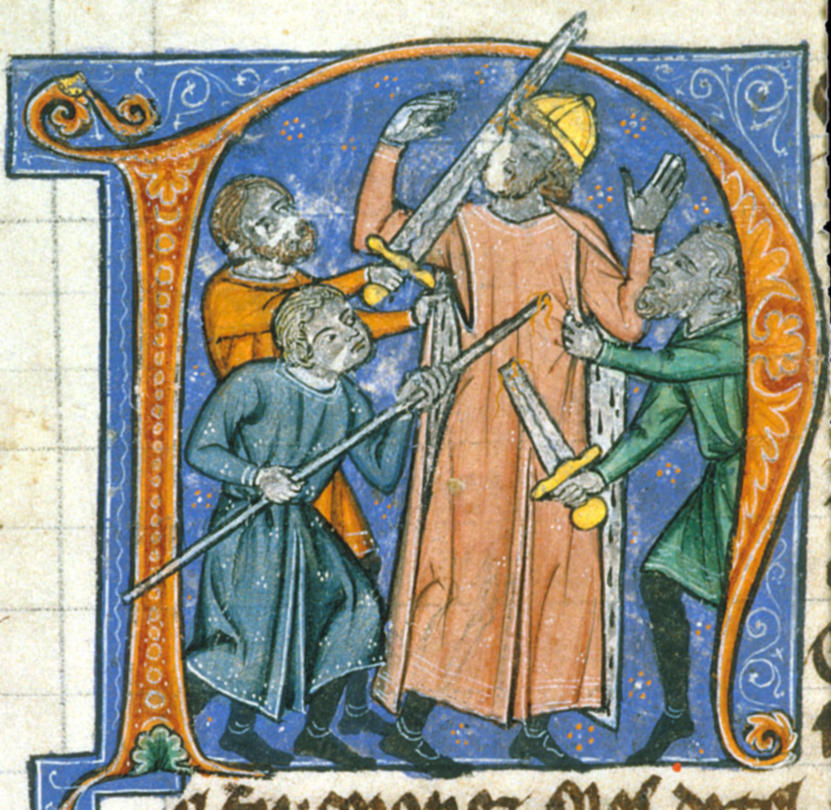
Death of Sanguius (Zengi) in "Histoire d'Outremer", Guillaume de Tyr MS, 1232–1261, British Library.

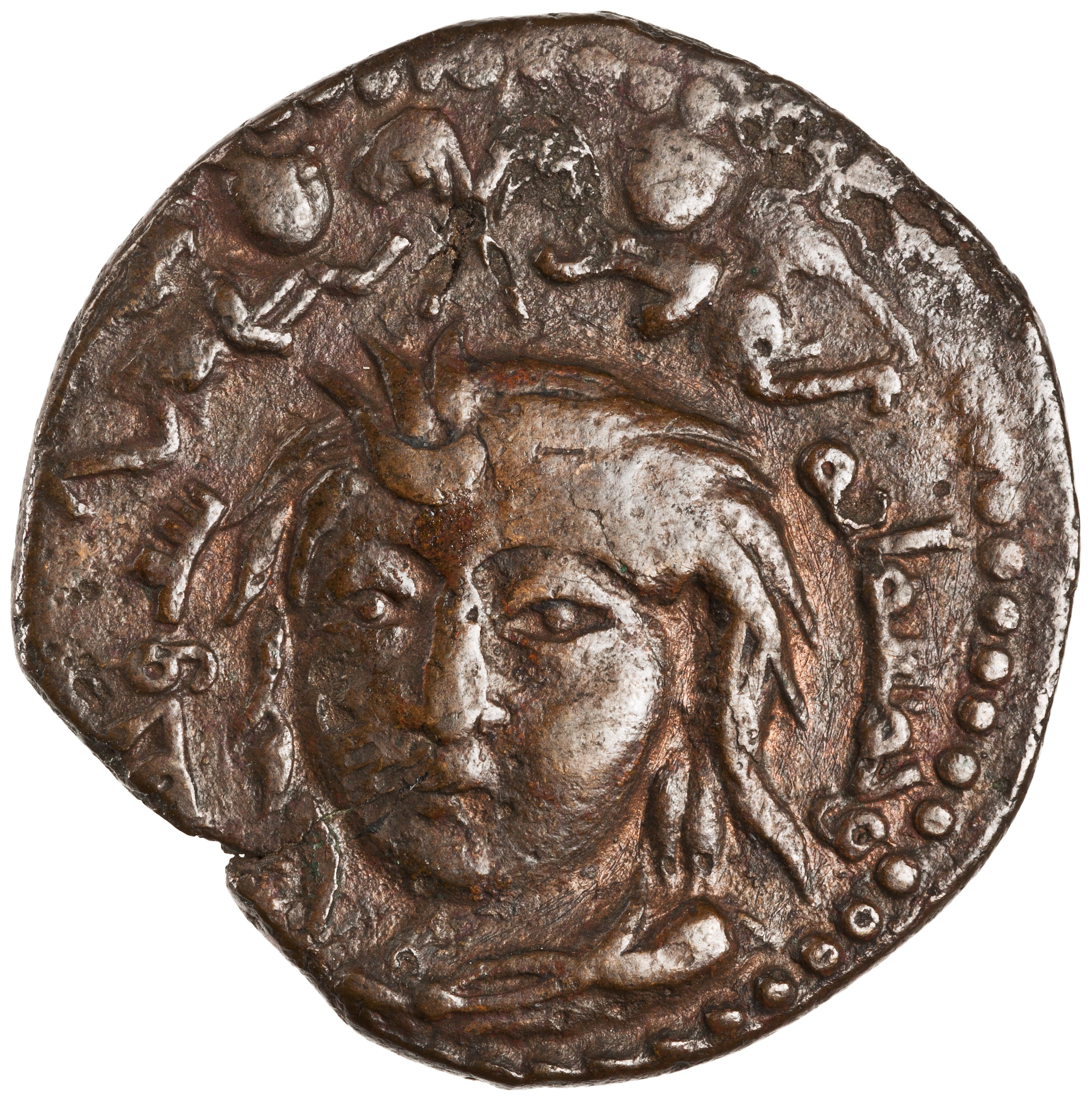
Coin of Qutb al-Din Mawdud (r. 1149–1170), son of Zengi. Dated AH 556 (1160–1161 CE).

Zengi continued his attempts to take Damascus in 1145. According to the Islamic sources, he was assassinated by a Frankish slave named Yarankash in September 1146, after the atabeg drunkenly threatened him with punishment for drinking from his goblet. The western sources state that Zengi was assassinated by his own court officials.

According to Ibn 'al-Adim:

The Atabeg was violent, powerful, awe-inspiring and liable to attack suddenly ... When he rode, the troops use to walk behind him as if they were between two threads, out of fear they would trample over crops, and nobody out of fear dared to trample on a single stem (of them) nor march his horse on them ... If anyone transgressed, he was crucified. He (Zengi) used to say: "It does not happen that there is more than one tyrant (meaning himself) at one time."

Zengi was the founder of the eponymous Zengid dynasty. In Mosul he was succeeded by his eldest son Sayf al-Din Ghazi I, and in Aleppo he was succeeded by his second son Nur al-Din. When Sayf died in 1149, he was succeeded in Mosul by a third son Qutb al-Din Mawdud.

== Sources ==
- "Baalbek", Encyclopaedia of Islam: A Dictionary of the Geography, Ethnography, and Biography of the Muhammadan Peoples, vol. I (1st ed.), Leiden: E.J. Brill, 1913, pp. 543–544
- Bosworth, C. E. (1996). The New Islamic Dynasties: A Chronological and Genealogical Manual. New York: Columbia University Press.
- El-Azhari, Taef (2016). Zengi and the Muslim Response to the Crusades. Routledge.
- Amin Maalouf, The Crusades Through Arab Eyes, 1985
- Steven Runciman, A History of the Crusades, vol. II: The Kingdom of Jerusalem. Cambridge University Press, 1952.
- The Damascus Chronicle of the Crusades, Extracted and Translated from the Chronicle of Ibn al-Qalanisi. H. A. R. Gibb, 1932 (reprint, Dover Publications, 2002).
- Gonella, Julia (2005). Die Zitadelle von Aleppo und der Tempel des Wettergottes. Münster: Rhema-Verlag. ISBN 978-3-930454-44-0.
- William of Tyre, A History of Deeds Done Beyond the Sea, trans. E. A. Babcock and A. C. Krey. Columbia University Press, 1943.
- An Arab-Syrian Gentleman and Warrior in the Period of the Crusades; Memoirs of Usamah ibn-Munqidh (Kitab al i'tibar), trans. Philip K. Hitti. New York, 1929.
- The Second Crusade Scope and Consequences Edited by Jonathan Phillips & Martin Hoch, 2001.
- The Chronicle of Michael the Syrian (Khtobo D-Makethbonuth Zabne) (finished 1193–1195)

Regnal titles
Preceded by Mahmud II; Sultan of Hamadan	Emir of Mosul; 1127–1146	Succeeded by Sayf al-Din Ghazi I
