= Military Order of Cross-bearers with the Red Star on a Blue Field =

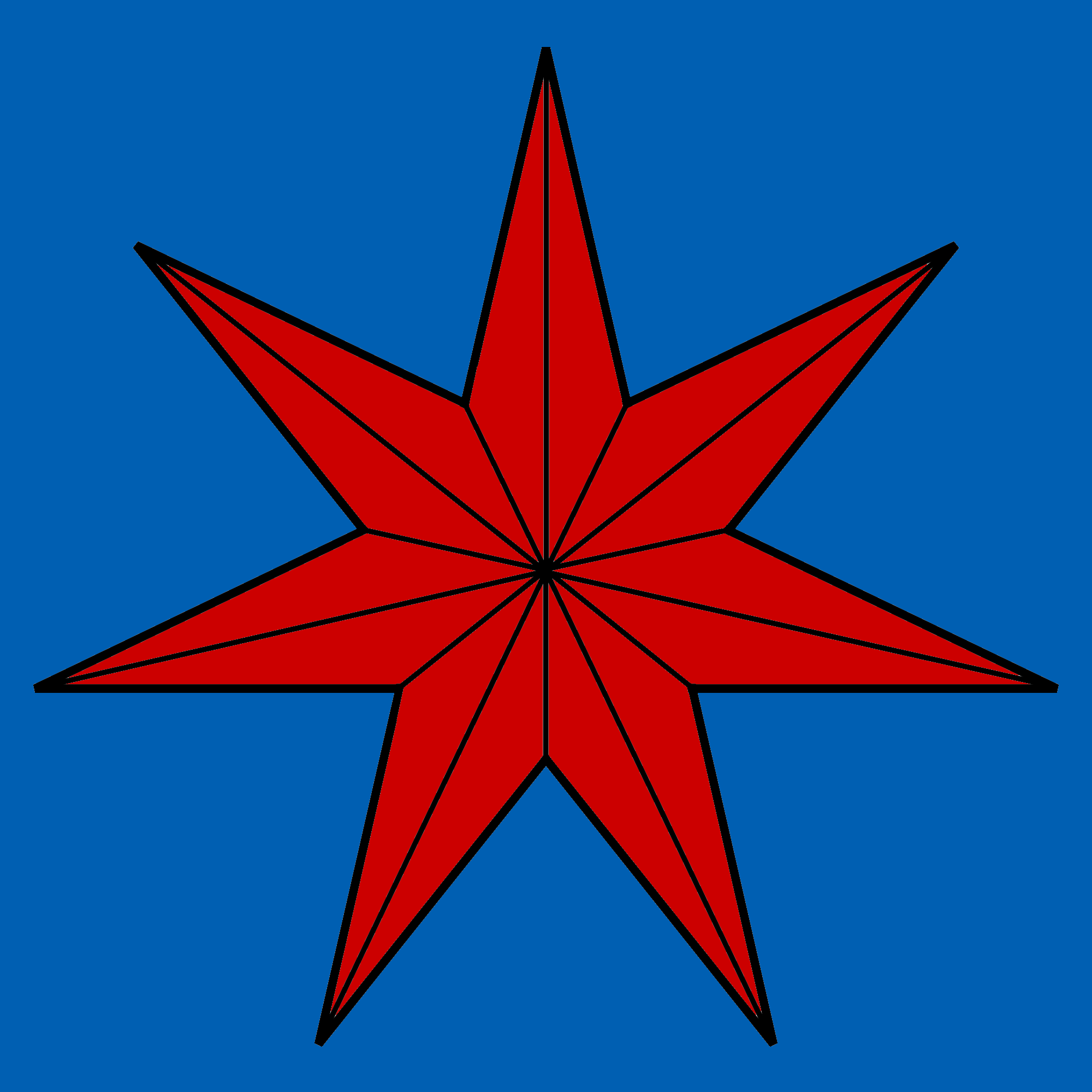
Emblem of the Order

The Bethlehemites or Military order of cross-bearers with the red star on a blue field (Italian: Betlemitani) was a military order active in the 12th to 15th centuries. It arose in the Holy Land under the jurisdiction of the bishop of Bethlehem.

To the commander Giuseppe Vallerga di Loano, the Latin Patriarchate of Jerusalem gave the right to found a seminary in Bethlehem. Varazze became the location for many of the Bethlehemites from around 1100 to 1440, following their expulsion from the Holy Land.

In the Roman Catholic Diocese of Asti during the 13th century, thanks to the encouragement of the bishop Landolfo di Vergiate, the order managed the administration of the churches of Saint George and Saint Pancras in the city as well as that of Gamalero and the hospital of Quattordio.

The order continued up through the 16th century, where its ownership of a house in San Paolo Solbrito is documented. It was eventually suppressed in 1656 by Pope Alexander VII.

== Bibliography ==
- Ruggeri, Carlo (2012). I fratelli stellati. Storia, poteri e simboli dell'ordine Betlemitano (in Italian). SAGEP.
- (in Italian) G. Visconti. Diocesi di Asti e Istituti di vita religiosa, lineamenti per una storia, Gazzetta d'Asti, 2006
- (in Italian) G. Bosio. Storia della Chiesa di Asti, ristampa anastatica, Asti 2003.ISBN 88-88491-18-X
