= Fall of Saruj =

12th c. military conflict

Date	Early January 1145
Location	Saruj
Result	Zengid victory

Belligerents
Zengids	County of Edessa

Commanders and leaders
Imad al-Din Zengi	Unknown

Strength
Unknown	Unknown

Casualties and losses
None	None

The Fall of Saruj in 1145 saw the main surviving Frankish fortress of Edessa fall to the Zengids.

Following the capture of Edessa in 1144, the Zengid ruler, Imad al-din Zengi, wanted to exploit his victory by clearing the remaining Crusader fortresses on the east of the Euphrates, which was his main goal. In early January 1145, Zengi marched towards Saruj. The Crusader garrison and the inhabitants evacuated the town to Birecik before the arrival of the Zengids. Zengi captured the city without a fight. Zengi went to besiege Birecik after that, but after three months of siege, he retreated.
