= Quintus Marcius Crispus =

1st century BC Roman senator and military officer

Quintus Marcius Crispus (fl. 1st century BC) was a Roman senator and military officer who served under Julius Caesar during the civil wars of the late Roman Republic.

== Biography ==
A member of the Plebeian gens Marcia, Crispus had possibly been elected to the office of Aedile by 58 BC. He was then appointed as one of Lucius Calpurnius Piso’s legati, serving in Macedonia from 57 BC to 56/55 BC. Sometime between 54 BC and 47 BC, Crispus was elected to the office of Praetor, and, although he had no strong political ties to him, by 46 BC, he was serving under Julius Caesar in North Africa as one of Caesar's legates. During this portion of the campaign, he was given the responsibility of attacking the town of Thabena, which he then garrisoned after taking it.

In 45 BC, Crispus was made Proconsular governor of Bithynia et Pontus. In the following year, he took three legions to Syria, to provide aid to the Caesarean governor Lucius Staius Murcus who was fighting the pro-Pompeian former governor Quintus Caecilius Bassus. Together, they cornered Bassus at Apamea, and were acclaimed Imperator by their troops by early 43 BC.

In 43 BC, Crispus was replaced as governor of Bithynia, and his command over the three legions in Syria was stripped from him by Gaius Cassius Longinus, the new governor of Syria. Following this, he refused to serve under Cassius (unlike Statius Murcus), and temporarily retired from political life.

It has been conjectured that Crispus was the Quintus Marcius who was appointed suffect consul in 36 BC. If so, he replaced Marcus Cocceius Nerva as consul on 1 July 36 BC.

== See also ==
- List of Roman consuls

== Sources ==
- Broughton, T. Robert S., The Magistrates of the Roman Republic, Vol I (1951)
- Broughton, T. Robert S., The Magistrates of the Roman Republic, Vol III (1986)
- Ryan, Francis X., The Aedileship and Praetorship of Q. Marcius Crispus (1997)
- Syme, Ronald, The Roman Revolution (1939)
