= Militia of the Faith of Jesus Christ =

Military order

The Militia or Order of the (Holy) Faith of Jesus Christ (Latin: Militia Jesu Christi) was an ephemeral military order founded in Languedoc in or shortly before 1221. It owed its origins probably to Folquet de Marselha, the Bishop of Toulouse; Simon de Montfort, 5th Earl of Leicester, leader of the Albigensian Crusade; and possibly to Dominic of Caleruega, the founder of the Friars Preachers.

== Foundation ==
In June 1221 it appears to have been approved by Pope Honorius III, who gave it permission to observe the ordinances of the Order of the Temple of Solomon. In July the Pope appears to have transferred all authority over the foundation of the order (and therefore its survival) to the papal legate Conrad of Urach.

The specific purpose of the founding was "to promise aid and succour to Amaury de Montfort and his heirs, for the defence of his person and domains" and as inquisitors for the "seeking out and destruction of evil heretics and their lands and also of those who rebel against the faith of the holy church." This was confirmed by Honorius in two letters of the summer of 1221. The order has been described as a penitential confraternity rather than a full-fledged military order, but nevertheless it was founded at the height of the Albigensian Crusade to fight Catharism and had requested of the pope the right to fight in Languedoc like the Templars did in the Holy Land. Its first master was Pierre Savary (Peter Savaric), who called himself the "humble and poor master of the militia of the order of the faith of Jesus Christ" in a document of Carcassonne dated 9 February 1221. Despite the formal organisation and the papal approval, it seems that Conrad of Urach intended to disband the order when it was no longer needed, for in February 1221 he ordered that all lands which had been or would be granted it by Amaury or any other patron should revert to the donors.

== Merger with the Dominicans ==
It has been asserted that a letter of Gregory IX in 1231 shows the Militia, lacking even support from Amaury, being merged into the Order of Santiago, but the militia being referred to is the Order of the Faith and Peace and not the Faith of Jesus Christ. It has also been asserted that the Militia was brought across the Alps and established in Italy as the Milizia di Gesù Cristo, but the soundness of this hypothesis is unknown. Neither Militia should be confused with the modern Militia Jesu Christi, which is unaffiliated with either. Nor is the Militia to be confused with the 19th-century Italian movement known as the Order of the Holy Ghost or Santafedisti, though there were some commonalities.

The Militia of the Faith of Jesus Christ appears to have been under heavy Dominican influence at this time. In a bull of 18 May 1235, Gregory IX confided the Militia to the care of Jordan of Saxony, second master-general of the Dominican Order. In the same year he decreed for the knights a Dominican-inspired habit of black and white. Lastly, the Militia was very largely influenced by a famous Dominican, Bartolomeo of Braganza (or of Vicenza).

According to the research of Raymund of Capua, who became a Dominican about 1350, the Militia was merged with the Dominican Order of Penance (Ordo de Poenitentia Sancti Dominici) to form the Third Order of Saint Dominic. The constitutions of the two orders, that of Gregory IX for the Militia in 1235 and that of Muñón de Zamora for the Order of Penance in 1285, were very similar, though Muñón de Zamora expressly forbids the carrying of arms except in defence of the Church, which may have covered the Militia's activities. According to later Bollandist historiography, the amalgamation of the orders became general in the 14th century.

== Bibliography ==
- Gustav Adolph Ackermann, Ordensbuch, Sämtlicher in Europa blühender und erloschener Orden und Ehrenzeichen. Annaberg, 1855, p 208 n°75. "Orden des Glaubens Jesu Christi" - Google Books (Former orders of France : p. 205-214)
- Federici, Domenico Maria (1787). Istoria de cavalieri Gaudenti, 2 vols. Venice: Stampeteria Coleti.
- Forey, Alan J. (1989). "The Military Orders and Holy War against Christians in the Thirteenth Century." The English Historical Review, 104:410 (January ), pp. 1–24.
- Forey, Alan J. (1992). The Military Orders: From the Twelfth to the Early Fourteenth Centuries. Toronto: University of Toronto Press. ISBN 0-802028-05-5.
- Sismondi, Jean Charles Léonard de (1833). History of the Crusades Against the Albigenses in the Thirteenth Century. Boston: B. B. Mussey.
- Vincent, Catherine (2001). "Militia of Jesus Christ." Encyclopedia of the Middle Ages (New Jersey: Routledge University Press), pp. 953–54. ISBN 1-57958-282-6.
