= Order of Monfragüe =

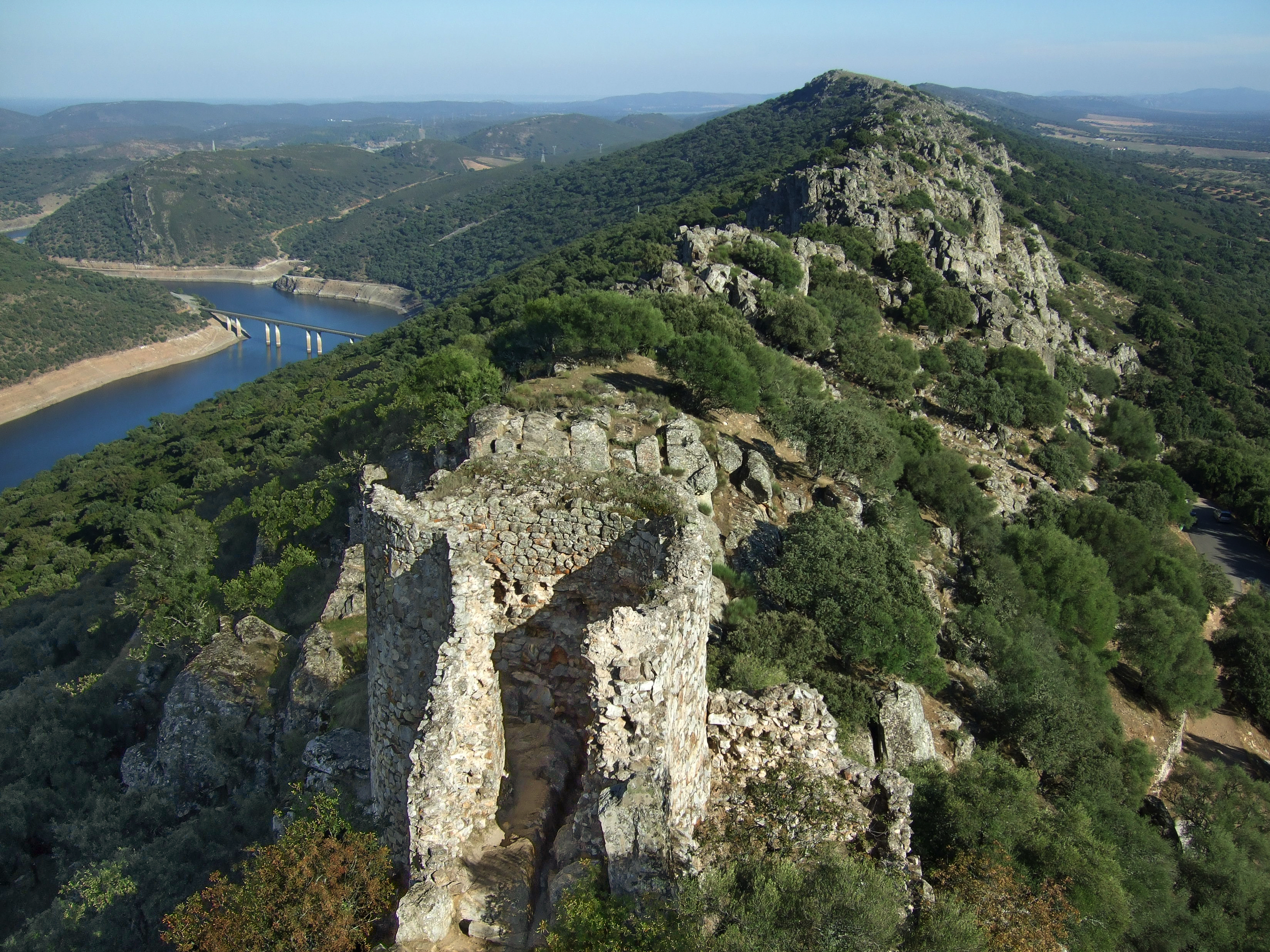
Ruins of the castle of Monfragüe, headquarters of the order

The Order of Monfragüe (Spanish: Orden de Monfragüe) was a Spanish military order founded at the castle of Monfragüe near Plasencia on the Tagus in 1196. The order was founded by the knights of the Order of Mountjoy who dissented from a merger with the Knights Templar. The order never prospered and on 23 May 1221, by order of Ferdinand III of Castile, it was merged into the Order of Calatrava.

== Formation ==
In the twelfth century Monfragüe was the centre of a Mountjoy commandery before it became the headquarters of its own order. The earliest reference to the commandery is in an economic transaction involving the commander, Gonzalo Padilla, and his fellow brothers (freyes, freires) of the Order. As early as 1186 the Order had tried to amalgamate with the Templars but failed. The remaining decade of its existence was spent in a state of utter collapse. The Order was united in December 1187 with the Hospital of the Holy Redeemer, but already a distinction had appeared in its ranks between the master of the order, Fralmo, and his followers on one hand and the commander of the Order in the Kingdom of Castile, Rodrigo González, and his support. By mid-1188 there was a schism in the Order, though it does not appear to have broken down along the lines Castile and León on one hand and the Crown of Aragon on the other, as sometimes supposed. When the final split occurred in 1196, over the successful amalgamation with the Templars, all opponents of the merger would have had to leave the lands of Alfonso II of Aragon, a strong supporter of the Temple.

The internal split of 1188 was sparked by opposition to the leadership of Fralmo and he was forced to leave Alfambra, the Order's headquarters, by the supporters of Rodrigo. In 1198 his supporters claimed that at that time (1188) Rodrigo had been acclaimed master (he had not). In March 1195, Pope Celestine III issued a bull granting a "certain house", evidently the Holy Redeemer, which Fralmo had been seeking for his own purposes, to the Templars. The validity of this action was subsequently to be challenged by the knights of Mountjoy opposed to a merger with the Templars. The final split within the Order of Mountjoy occurred only with the Templar merger in 1196. The discontents managed to hold onto Monfragüe, which they made their centre of operations, and make Rodrigo González their master. They were confined to Castile.

== Acquisitions ==
Alfonso VIII of Castile was the principal benefactor of the Order. The first document confirming the existence of the Order of Monfragüe was promulgated at San Miguel de Sortello on 13 January 1197 by Alfonso, who granted to the order and its master, Rodrigo González, an annual rent of fifteen cahices toledanos of salt from the mines of Talavera. On 31 May 1210, at Cuenca, Doña Sol, widow of Pedro Martínez, alcalde of Talavera, with the presence and permission of Alfonso VIII, sold most of her inheritance in Gébalo (Xenalo) to Rodrigo González and the Order for 500 maravedíes. When Ferdinand III dissolved the Order in 1221 all its possessions in Talavera were granted to the city.

On 30 June 1206, at Frías, Alfonso gave to the Order and Rodrigo González ten yugadas of land in the free territory of Magán. On 19 January 1210, at Moratalaz, the king granted to the Order, Rodrigo González its master, and Juan García, a commander, a same-sized territory (ten yugadas) acquired from the monastery of Santa María la Real of Burgos in exchange for Navarrete, as well as ten aranzadas of vineyard in Magán and the same amount in Fontalva and Ayllón; he also granted them a mill in Arfagazo. In return Alfonso received the castle and village of Segura de Toro near Béjar.

== Union with Calatrava ==
The cross emblem used by the order of Monfragüe

The knights of Monfragüe possessed the Holy Redeemer hospital when, at the Fourth Lateran Council of 1215, the master of the Order of Calatrava argued that the members of the Hospital wished to join his order. Pope Innocent III and the Cistercians approved and the final decision was laid down in June 1216, despite protests from the Templars. The decision to amalgamate the Orders was affirmed by Pope Honorius III in 1217. Nonetheless it was delayed, probably until the king of Castile felt the need of having a more secure state of affairs among the orders guarding his southern frontier.

At Segovia, on 23 May 1221, Ferdinand III granted all the rights and castles, including Monfragüe, to the Order of Calatrava, effectively merging the smaller order into the larger. This command was not perfectly followed through and initially Mauricio, the bishop of Burgos, and Tello Téllez de Meneses, the bishop of Palencia, aided by the archdeacon of Valpuesta, were assigned to arbitrate ongoing disputes. Yet as late as 1225 there were conflicts between the brothers of the old Order of Monfragüe and the master and knights of Calatrava. On March 1 that year, Honorius III sent a commission under the bishop, dean, and archdeacon of Burgos to resolve the dispute. They failed and the dispute was brought before Rome, where the Calatravan delegates failed to appear. In May 1234 Gregory IX nonetheless sent it to a tribunal in an attempt to reach compromise before judging in favour of Monfragüe. On 5 June 1234 Gregory ordered the possessions of Monfragüe be restored to those members of the Order who opposed the merger with Calatrava. This does not seem to have taken place and the merger seems to have been complete by 1245, when Ferdinand could grant Calatrava Priego de Córdoba in exchange for the castle of Monfragüe (among others).

References to the "lands and rights once held by the Holy Redeemer" continued throughout the remainder of the century and in after the abolition of the Templars in 1312, James II of Aragon was counselled to revive the Order of Mountjoy or the Holy Redeemer and grant Templar lands to it with Montesa as its headquarters. This was done, but the order was called the Order of Montesa.

== Bibliography ==
Published

- Barton, Simon (1997). The Aristocracy in Twelfth-Century León and Castile. Cambridge: Cambridge University Press. ISBN 0-521-49727-2.
- Forey, Alan J. (1971). "The Order of Mountjoy." Speculum, 46:2 (April), pp. 250–266.
- Matilla, Enrique Rodríguez-Picavea (1999). "Documentos para el estudio de la Orden de Calatrava en la Meseta meridional castellana (1102-1302)." Cuadernos de Historia Medieval Secc. Colecciones Documentales (Universidad Autónoma de Madrid), 2. ISSN 1139-756X.
- O'Callaghan, Joseph F. (2001). "The Interior Life of the Military Religious Orders of Medieval Spain." Malta Study Center Lecture Series, Presented at St. John's University, Collegeville, MN, October 2001.
- San Pedro, Miguel Muñoz de (1953). "La desaparecida Orden de caballeros de Monfragüe." Hidalguía, 1:68–76.
- Velo y Nieto, G. (1950). La Orden de caballeros de Monfrag. Madrid: Otice.
