= Siege of Baalbek =

12th century military conflict

Date	1139
Location	Baalbek
Result	Zengid victory

Belligerents
Zengids	Burids

Commanders and leaders
Imad al-Din Zengi	Buri

Strength
Unknown	Unknown

Casualties and losses
Unknown	Heavy losses, garrison massacred

The siege of Baalbek in 1139 was undertaken by Imad al-Din Zengi who laid siege to the city in August and captured it in October.

In 1139 Imad al-Din Zengi marched south of Aleppo to Baalbek which he laid siege to on 28 August with a large army and fourteen siege engines. The town was captured on 9 or 10 October and the citadel surrendered on 12 or 21 October after Zengi swore to spare the lives of the garrison. Zengi broke his oath and they were all brutally massacred, the governor was flayed and most of the others were hanged. The massacre was intended to terrify the Damascenes. Zengi named Nağm ad-Din Ayyub, the father of Saladin, as the governor of Baalbek.
