= Military order (religious society) =

One of a variety of Christian societies of knights

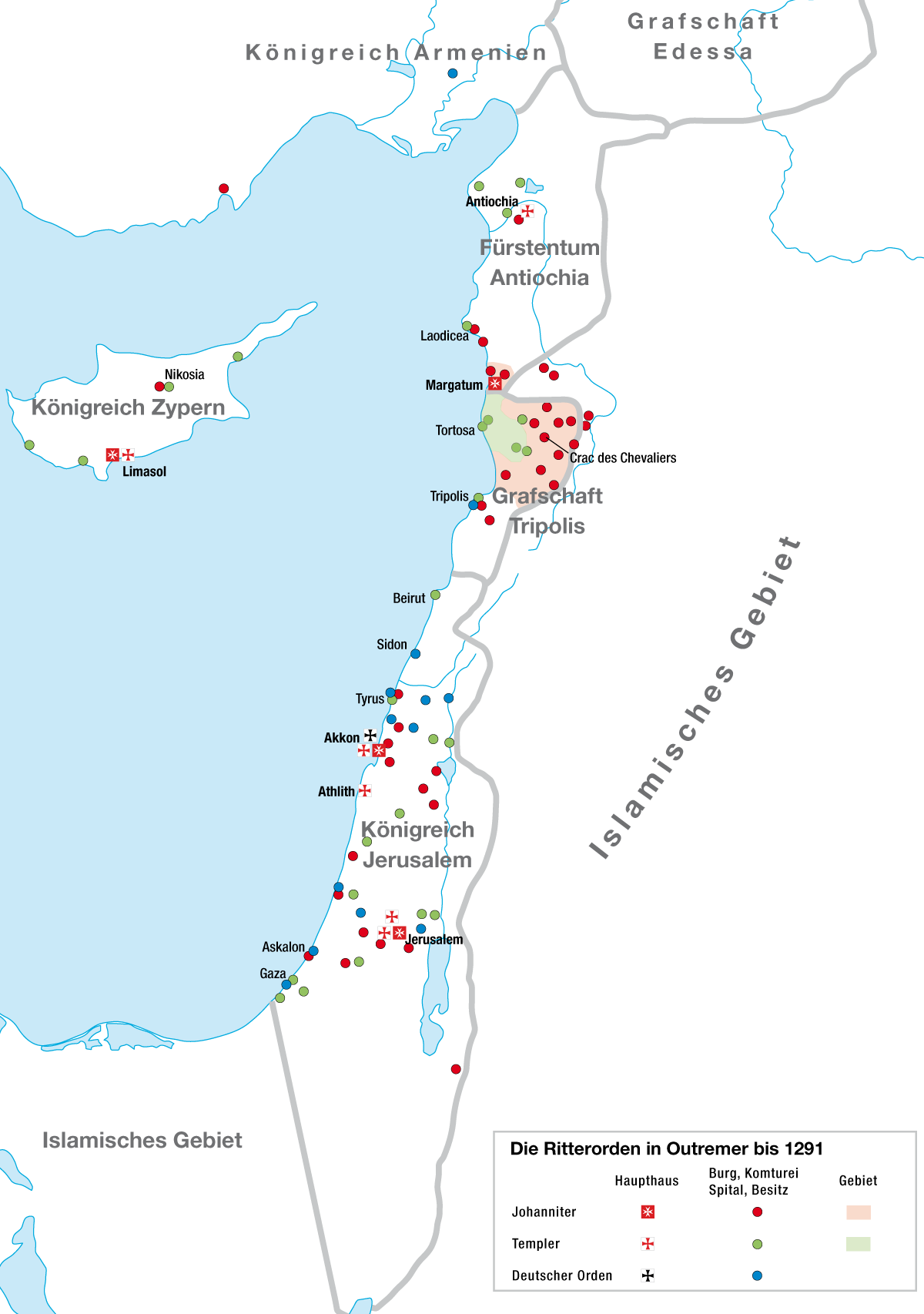
Military orders' presence in the Crusader states (in German). Column content: order – main seat – property (castle, commandery, hospital, etc.) – territory. Line by line: Hospitallers (white cross – red dot – salmon); Templars (red cross – green dot – green); German Order (black cross – blue dot)

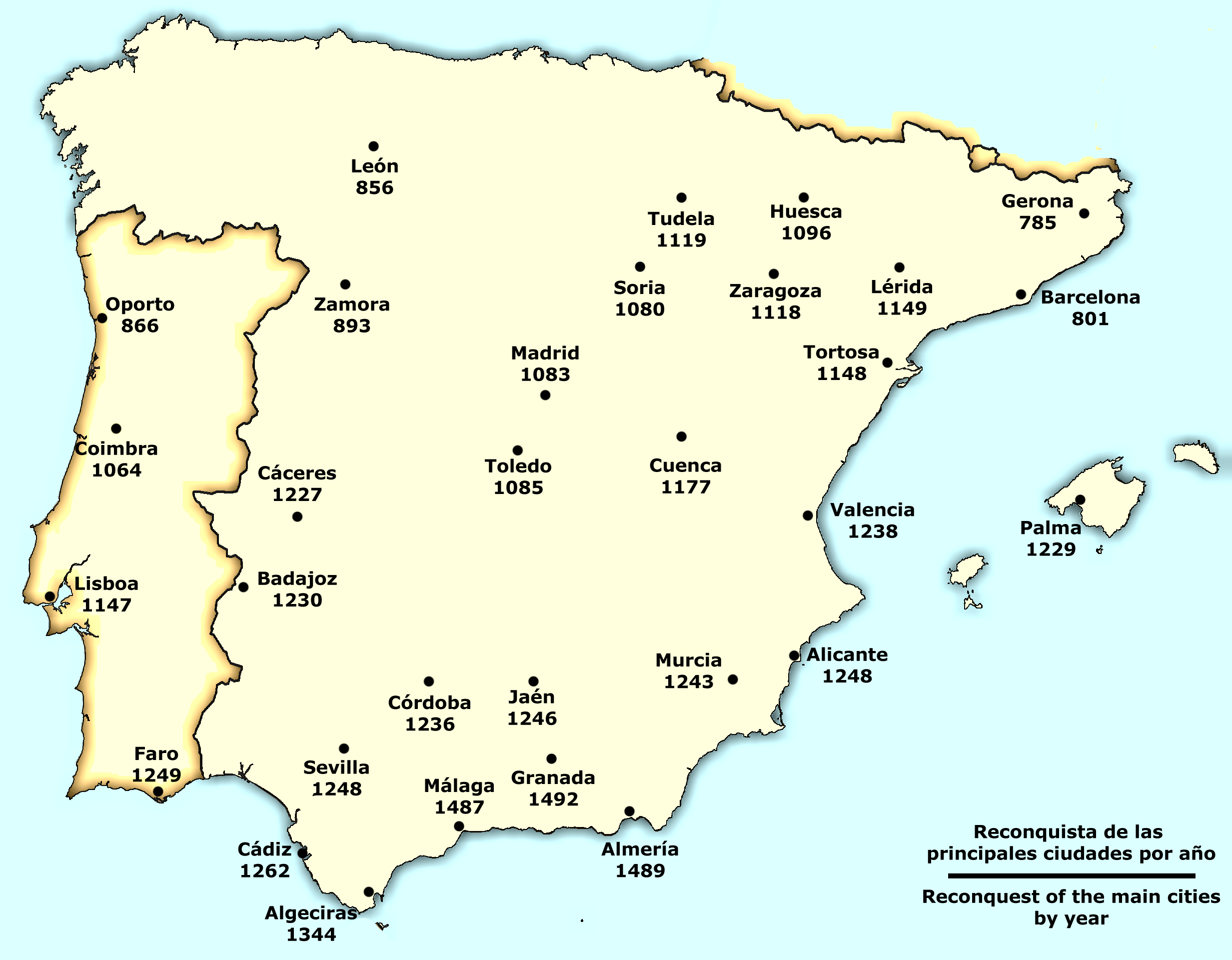
Reconquista of the main towns in the Iberian Peninsula (per year; in Spanish)

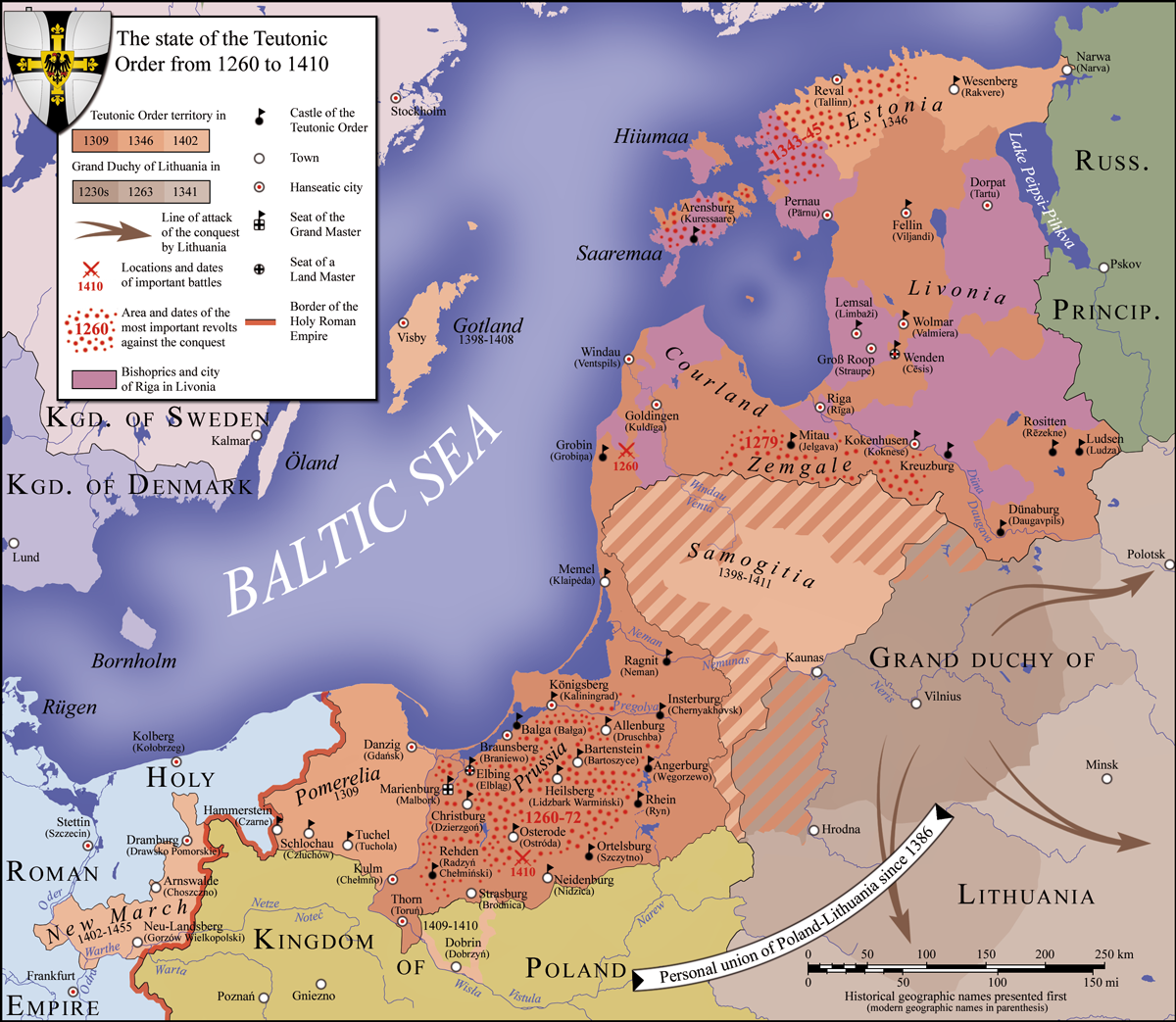
Extent of the Teutonic Order in 1410

A military order (Latin: ordo militaris) is a Latin Catholic religious order of knights. The original military orders were the Knights Templar, the Knights Hospitaller, the Order of the Holy Sepulchre, the Order of Saint James, the Order of Calatrava, and the Teutonic Knights. They arose in the Middle Ages in association with the Crusades – the Crusader states (mainly the Kingdom of Jerusalem in the Holy Land), the Baltics, and the Iberian peninsula; their members being initially dedicated to the protection of Christian pilgrims, and eventually to the defence of the Crusader states and the conquest of non-Christian or even non-Catholic lands. They are the predecessors of chivalric orders.

Most members of military orders were laymen who took religious vows, such as of poverty, chastity, and obedience, according to monastic ideals. The orders owned houses called commanderies all across Europe and had a hierarchical structure of leadership with the grand master at the top.

The Knights Templar, the largest and most influential of the military orders, was suppressed in the early fourteenth century; only a handful of orders were established and recognized afterwards. However, some persisted longer in their original functions, such as the Sovereign Military Order of Malta and the Order of Saint John, the respective Catholic and German Protestant successors of the Knights Hospitaller, alongside the Order of the Holy Sepulchre, which remains active under the Pope's sovereignty. Those military orders that survive today have evolved into purely honorific or ceremonial orders or else into charitable foundations.

== History ==
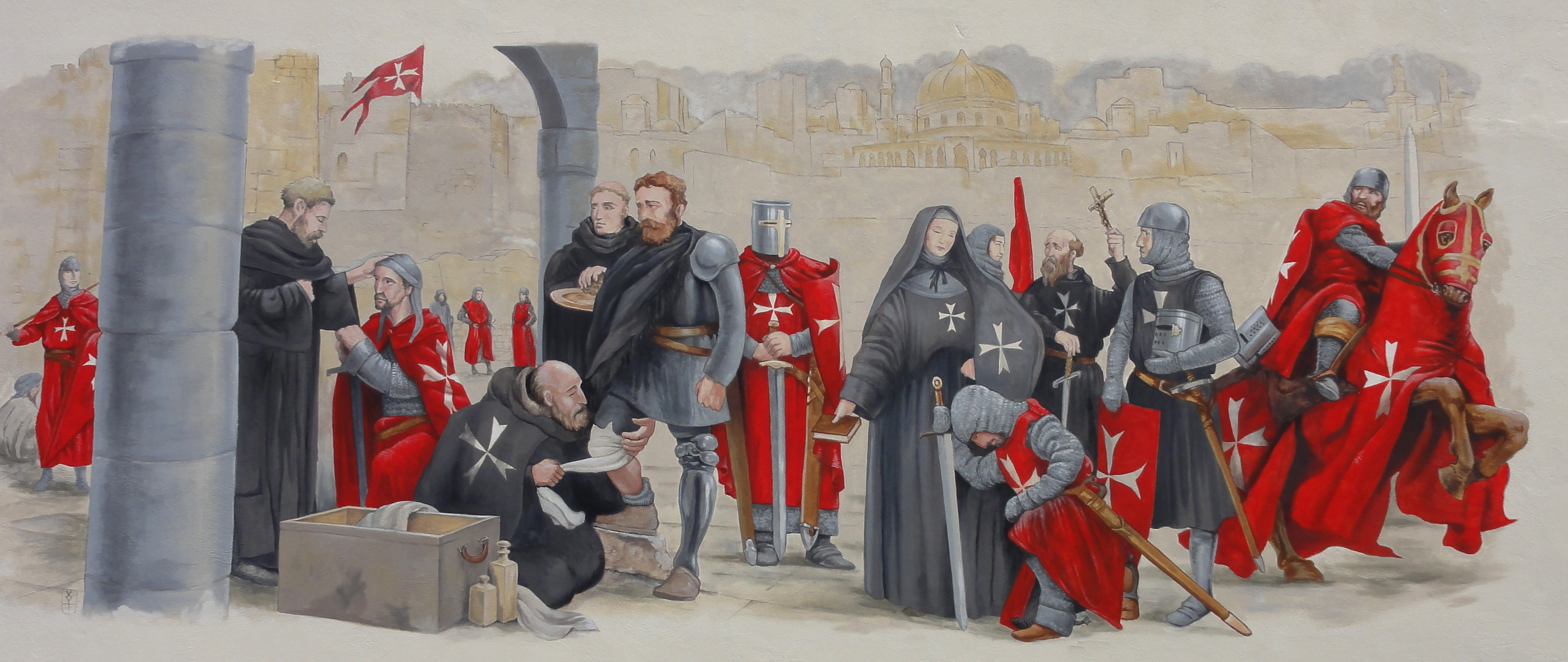
The Hospitallers in the 13th century

In 1053, for the Battle of Civitate, the Knights of Saint Peter (Milites Sancti Petri) was founded as a militia by Pope Leo IX to counter the Normans.

In response to the Islamic conquests of the former Byzantine Empire, numerous Catholic military orders were set up following the First Crusade. The founding of such orders suited the Catholic church's plan of channeling the devotion of the European nobility toward achieving the Church's temporal goals, and it also complemented the Peace and Truce of God. The foundation of the Knights Templar in 1118 provided the first in a series of tightly organized military forces for the purpose of opposing Islamic conquests in the Holy Land and in the Iberian Peninsula – see the Reconquista – as well as Islamic invaders and pagan tribes in Eastern Europe which were perceived as threats to the Church's supremacy.

The first secularized military order was the Order of Saint George, founded in 1326 by King Charles I of Hungary, through which he made all the Hungarian nobility swear loyalty to him. Shortly thereafter, the Order of the "Knights of the Band" was founded in 1332 by King Alfonso XI of Castile. Both orders existed only for about a century.

== Purpose ==
The original features of the military orders were the combination of religious and military ways of life. Some of them, like the Knights Hospitaller, the Knights of Saint Thomas, and the Order of Saints Maurice and Lazarus also had charitable purposes and cared for the sick and poor. However, they were not purely male institutions, as nuns could attach themselves as convents of the orders. One significant feature of the military orders was that clerical brothers could be subordinate to non-ordained brethren.

In 1818, orientalist Joseph von Hammer compared the Catholic military orders, in particular the Knights Templar, to certain Islamic models such as the Muslim sect of Assassins. In 1820, José Antonio Conde suggested they were modeled on the ribat, a fortified religious institution which brought together a religious or hospital way of life with fighting the enemies of Islam. However popular such views may have become, others have criticized this view, suggesting there were no such ribats around Outremer until after the military orders had been founded.

The role and function of the military orders extended beyond their military exploits in the Holy Land, Prussia, and the Baltics. In fact, they had extensive holdings and staff throughout Western Europe. The majority were laymen. They provided a conduit for cultural and technical innovation, such as the introduction of fulling into England by the Knights Hospitaller, and the banking facilities of the Knights Templar.

=== Northern crusades ===
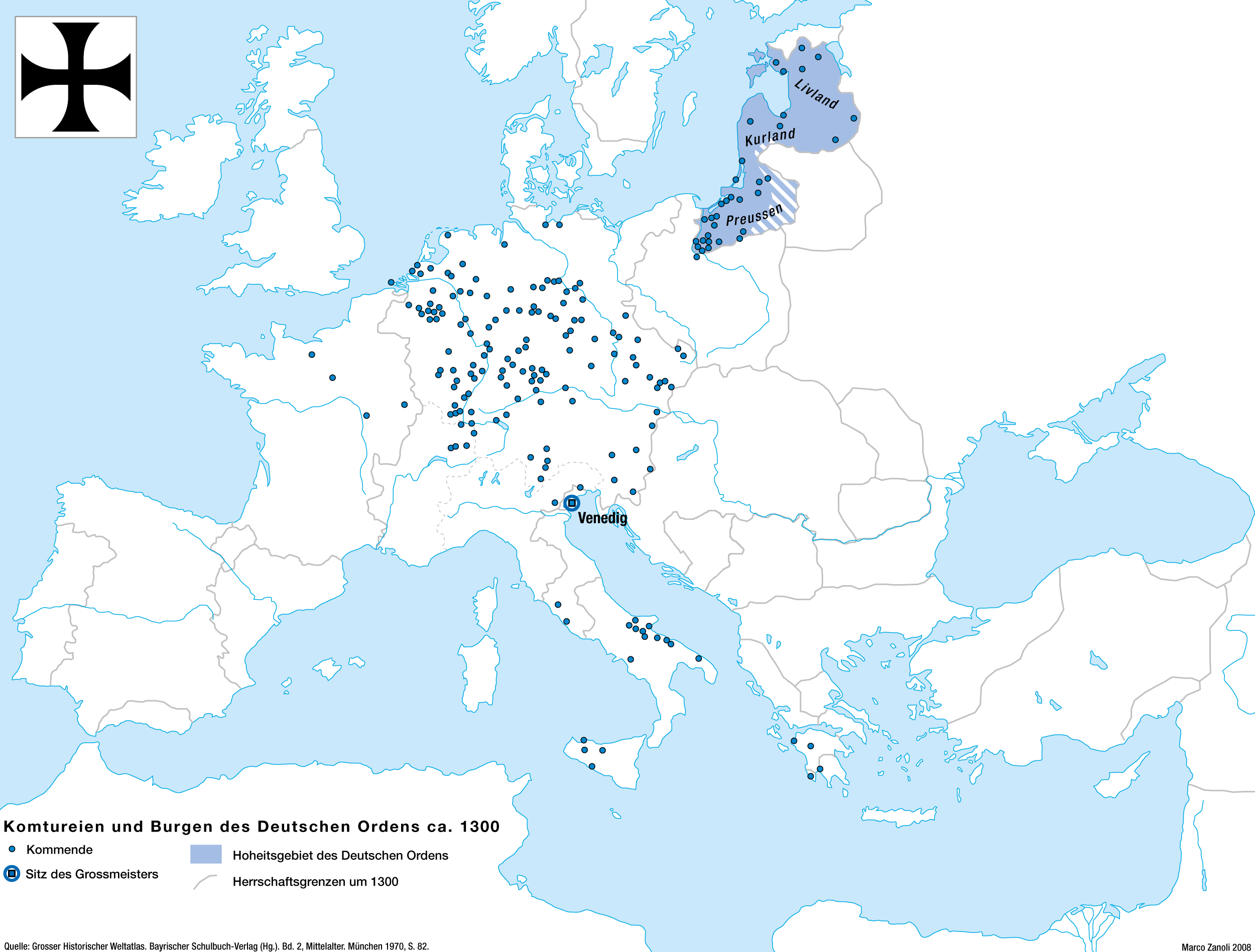
Map of the branches of the Teutonic Order in Europe around 1300. Shaded area is sovereign territory, Grand Master HQ in Venice is highlighted

In 1147 Bernard of Clairvaux persuaded Pope Eugenius III that the Germans' and Danes' conflict with the pagan Wends was a holy war analogous to the Reconquista; he urged a crusade until all heathens were baptised or killed. The new crusaders' motivation was primarily economic: the acquisition of new arable lands and serfs; the control of Baltic trade routes; and the abolishment of the Novgorodian merchants' monopoly of the fur trade. From the early 13th century the military orders provided garrisons in Old Livonia and defended the German commercial centre, Riga. The Livonian Brothers of the Sword and the Order of Dobrzyń were established by local bishops. The Sword Brothers were notorious for cruelty to "pagans" and converts alike. The Teutonic Knights were founded during the 1190s in Palestine, but their strong links to Germany diverted efforts from the Holy Land to the Baltic. Between 1229 and 1290, the Teutonic Knights absorbed both the Brothers of the Sword and the Order of Dobrzyń, subjugated most of the Baltic tribes and established a ruthless and exploitative monastic state. The Knights invited foreign nobility to join their regular Reisen, or raids, against the last unconquered Baltic people, the Lithuanians. These were fashionable events of chivalric entertainment among young aristocrats. Jogaila, Grand Duke of Lithuania, converted to Catholicism and married Queen Jadwiga of Poland resulting in a united Polish–Lithuanian army routing the Knights at Tannenberg in 1410. The Knights' state survived, from 1466 under Polish suzerainty. Prussia was transformed into a secular duchy in 1525, and Livonia in 1562.

== List of military orders ==
These are military orders listed chronologically according to their dates of foundation and extinction, sometimes approximate due to scarce sources, and/or repeated suppressions by Papal or royal authorities.

They are divided into international and national according to their adherence, mission, and enrollment, disregarding the extent of eventual gradual geographical distribution outside of their region of concern.

=== International ===
Symbol	Name	Founded	Founder	Origin	Recognition	Protection	Extinction	Notes
	Knights Hospitaller (Sovereign Military Order of Malta and the Order of Saint John)	c. 1099	Gerard Thom	Jerusalem, Latin Kingdom of Jerusalem	1113 by Pope Paschal II	Grand Master (1113–), Prince (1607–), Cardinal (1630–)		One of the oldest institutions of Western and Christian civilisation, founded in Jerusalem in the 11th century, with a long history of service to the vulnerable and the sick. Since 1834 the Order of Malta's government seat has been in Rome, where it is guaranteed extraterritorial rights. A lay religious order of the Catholic Church since 1113 and a subject of international law, the Sovereign Order of Malta has diplomatic relations with over 100 states and the European Union, and permanent observer status at the United Nations. Recognizes a Protestant successor, the Order of Saint John. There are only five legitimate and mutually recognized Orders of St. John that continue to carry on the historic work of the Knights Hospitaller. These are the Sovereign Military and Hospitaller Order of St. John of Jerusalem of Rhodes and of Malta (The Order of Malta), Die Balley Brandenburg des Ritterlichen Ordens Sankt Johannis vom Spital zu Jerusalem, commonly known as the Johanniter Orden (Germany), Johanniter Orde in Nederland (Netherland), Johanniterorden I Sverige (Sweden), and the Most Venerable Order of the Hospital of St. John of Jerusalem (Order of St. John, sometimes referred to as the Most Venerable Order). In 1961, an alliance was formed between the Most Venerable Order, the Johanniter ORden, Johanniter Orde in Nederland, and Johanniterorden I Sverige; these four orders compromise the Alliance of the Orders of St. John.
	Order of the Holy Sepulchre (Militi Sancti Sepulcri)	c. 1099	Godfrey of Bouillon	Jerusalem, Latin Kingdom of Jerusalem	1103 by Baldwin I of Jerusalem; 1113 by Pope Paschal II	Kingdom of Jerusalem to 1291, Custos of the Holy Land: 1230–1489, Pope: 1489–		Originally an "association" of knights who guarded the Church of the Holy Sepulchre under the jurisdiction of the kings of Jerusalem. In 1113, they became consubstantial with the Canons of the Holy Sepulchre after their recognition by Pope Paschal II, as a military branch, Militi Sancti Sepulcri; after 1291, the Knighthood was awarded to prominent pilgrims by the Custos of the Holy Land. Reorganised as Sacred and Military Order of the Holy Sepulchre in 1496 by Pope Alexander VI. Reorganised by Pope Pius IX with the residential restoration of the Latin Patriarchate of Jerusalem in 1847. Known as the Equestrian Order of the Holy Sepulchre of Jerusalem since 1931.
	Knights Templar (Supreme Order of Christ) (Order Of Christ)	c. 1118 – c. 1312	Bernard of Clairvaux, Hugues de Payens	Jerusalem, Latin Kingdom of Jerusalem	1129 by Pope Honorius II until 1312 by Pope Clement V	Pope: 1129–1312	1312	The Knights Templar order was reconstituted in Portugal after the Templars were abolished on 22 March 1312 by the papal bull, Vox in excelso, issued by Pope Clement V. King Dinis I of Portugal created the Order of Christ (Portugal) in 1317 for those knights who survived their trials throughout Europe and was officially founded in 1319, The property of the Templars was transferred to the Knights Hospitaller except in the Kingdoms of Castile, Aragon, and Portugal. In effect, causing the dissolution of the Templars by the rival order. Thus when being recognized, the Pope allowing only the "Order Of Christ" a Portuguese order and its Papal branch Supreme Order of Christ can claim to have any descent from the Templars, which is now used for Honorary State merits in Portugal and preserved as such.
	Order of Saint Lazarus (Order of Saints Maurice and Lazarus)	c. 1118 – c. 1608		Jerusalem, Latin Kingdom of Jerusalem	1255 by Pope Alexander IV until 1489 by Pope Innocent VIII	King Fulk of Jerusalem: 1142; Pope: c. 1255–1572; House of Savoy: 1572– House of France: 1609–1830.	1489, 1572, 1609, 1830 (1856)	Italian branch merged 1572 with the Order of Saint Maurice to form the Order of Saints Maurice and Lazarus under the Royal House of Savoy, still extant. In 1609, King Henry IV of France linked it in France administratively to the Order of Our Lady of Mount Carmel to form the Royal Military and Hospitaller Order of Our Lady of Mount Carmel and Saint Lazarus of Jerusalem united, which remained listed as of royal protection in the French Royal Almanac until 1830.
	Teutonic Knights	c. 1192		Acre, Latin Kingdom of Jerusalem				The main stem of the Teutonic Knights converted into a purely Catholic religious order in 1929. The Bailiwick of Utrecht of the Teutonic Order separated from the Roman Catholic mainstem during the time of the Reformation and continues as a Protestant chivalric order.

=== National ===
Symbol	Name	Founded	Founder	Origin	Recognition	Protection	Extinction	Notes
	Order of Saint James of Altopascio	1075 (1084)	Matilda of Tuscany	Altopascio, Tuscany, Holy Roman Empire	1239–1459, but mentioned in a Papal bull 1198 of Pope Innocent III	Properties of the hospice of "Altopassus" in Italy confirmed in 1244 by Emperor Frederick II	1459, 1587, 1672	Primarily provided safety and protection to Italian pilgrims to the Holy Land and Camino de Santiago. Merged with the Order of Saint Stephen in 1587 by Pope Sixtus V at request of Grand Duke of Tuscany. In France absorbed into the Order of Saint Lazarus in 1672.
	Military Order of Monreal	1124	King Alfonso the Battler	Monreal del Campo, Aragon			1143; 1150	
	Order of Aviz	1176		(Évora)Avis, Portugal		House of Aviz: 1385–1580	1789	Secularised 1789. Statutes revised repeatedly together with the other Portuguese orders of merit, during the First Republic (1910–1926), then in 1962, and again in 1986.
	Order of Saint Michael of the Wing	1147 (1171) (1828/ 1848/ 1986)	King Afonso I of Portugal	Santarém, Portugal	First statutes approved in 1171 by Pope Alexander III	House of Braganza: 2001-	1732	Abandoned by 1732, restored by King Miguel I in 1828 during his brief rule before losing the Liberal Wars to his brother King Pedro IV, revived 1848/1986
	Order of Calatrava	1158	Raymond of Fitero	Calatrava la Vieja, Kingdom of Castile, Spain	1164 by Pope Alexander III	House of Bourbon	1838 by secularisation	King Charles III of Spain requested old orders to contribute to his new order in his name (1775), which led to dissolution. Confiscated by King Joseph (1808), re-established by Ferdinand VII at the Restoration (1814). Secularised in 1838.
	Order of the Holy Ghost	1161	Guy de Montpellier	Provence, France	ca. 1161–June 16, 1216 by Pope Innocent III in Santo Spirito in Sassia, Rome		1692/ 1700/ 20th century	Historically both religious and chivalric. In 1692 in France, King Louis XIV merged it with his own Order of Our Lady of Mount Carmel. The remaining organisation was edicted in 1700 as purely religious order. Offshoots of the order in France survived into the 20th century.
	Order of Aubrac	1162		Aubrac, France			18th century	Disappeared during the French Revolution in late in the 18th century.
	Order of Santiago	1170		León or Uclés in Castile, Spain	By Papal bull 5 July 1175 by Pope Alexander III	House of Bourbon		
	Order of Alcántara	1177		Alcántara, Extremadura, Spain				
	Order of Mountjoy	1180		Holy Land			1221	Merged into the Order of Calatrava.
	Order of Truxillo	before 1188		Trujillo, Spain			1195	
	Hospitallers of Saint Thomas of Canterbury at Acre	1191	William, Chaplain to the Dean	Acre, and England			1538	
	Order of Monfragüe	1196					1221	Merged into the Order of Calatrava.
	Order of Sant Jordi d'Alfama	1201	King Peter II of Aragon	Castle of Sant Jordi d'Alfama, Principality of Catalonia, Crown of Aragon			15th century	Early 15th century, merged into the Order of Montesa.
	Livonian Brothers of the Sword	1202					1236	Merged into the Teutonic Order as the Order of Livonia, disbanded 1561.
	Order of Dobrzyń	1216		Dobrzyń Land, Poland			1240	Small number, maximum 35 knights. Battled by the Prussians, around 1235 most knights joined the Teutonic Order. In 1237 the rest of the brothers reinforced Drohiczyn by order of Konrad. Last mentioned when Drohiczyn was captured by Prince Daniel of Kiev in 1240.
	Militia of the Faith of Jesus Christ	1221					1285	Note: Symbol that of the Dominican Order. Merged into the Third Order of Saint Dominic.
	Order of the Faith and Peace	1231					1273	
	Knights of the Cross with the Red Star	1233	Agnes of Bohemia	Bohemia	1237 by Pope Gregory IX; Confirmed 1292 by ambassador of Pope Nicholas IV			Mainly hospitals, in Bohemia still existing.
	Militia of Jesus Christ	1233	Bartolomeo da Vicenza	Parma	22 December 1234 by Pope Gregory IX.		1250s	Note: Symbol that of the Dominican Order. Disappeared mid-13th century.
	Order of the Blessed Virgin Mary	1261	Loderingo degli Andalò, Catalano dei Malavolti, Ugolino Lambertini	Bologna	23 December 1261 by Pope Urban IV		1556	
	Order of Saint Mary of Spain	1270					1280	Merged into the Order of Santiago.
	Order of Montesa	1317						
	Order of the Knights of Our Lord Jesus Christ (Knights Templar)	1317; 1917		Portugal			1789; 1910	Secularized 1789.
	Order of the Dragon	1408	Sigismund of Luxemburg	Hungary			1475s	Active throughout the 15th century in the Balkans
	Order of Saint Maurice	1434	Amedeo VIII of Savoy	Château de Ripaille, Thonon-les-Bains, Savoy			1572	Merged with the Order of Saint Lazarus in Italy in 1572 by Pope Gregory XIII into Order of Saints Maurice and Lazarus, considered the legitimate successor of both by the ICOC.
	Order of the Tower and Sword	1459	King Afonso V of Portugal	Portugal				Revived 1808 by Prince Regent John, later John VI of Portugal. Since the end of the monarchy in 1910, all military orders abolished except the Order of the Tower and Sword, with President of Portugal ex officio its Grand Master.
	Order of Our Lady of Bethlehem	1459	Pope Pius II	Lemnos, Byzantine Empire	18 January 1459 by Pope Pius II		1460	Founded in 1453 by Pope Pius II after the Fall of Constantinople to the Ottoman Empire, to defend the island of Lemnos, soon recaptured by the Turks, thus rendered useless and suppressed almost as soon as founded.
	Order of Saint George of Carinthia	1469	Emperor Frederick III, Holy Roman Emperor		In 1469 by Pope Paul II		Abolished 26 July 1598 (1732?)	
	Sacred Military Constantinian Order of Saint George	1522–1545 (1520?)(1550?)	Angeli Comneni family		Addressed in 1550 by Pope Julius III; Cardinal protector in 1910 by Pope Pius X	Decrees by King Philip III of Spain, Ferdinand II, Holy Roman Emperor on 7 November 1630		Appears to have been established between 1520 and 1545, with certain statutes dated 1522 by the Angeli Comneni family. Its Grand Master Andrea Angelo Flavio Comneno was addressed first in 1550 by Papal bull Quod Aliasla by Pope Julius III.
	Order of Saint Stephen Pope and Martyr	15 March 1561	Cosimo I de' Medici, Grand Duke of Tuscany	Tuscany	1 October 1561 by Pope Pius IV			Founded as Benedictine order by Cosimo I de' Medici, dedicated to the martyred Pope Stephen I and the victories at the Battle of Montemurlo in 1537 and the Battle of Marciano (Scannagallo) in 1554. Fought the Ottoman Turks and pirates in the Mediterranean Sea. Abolished in 1859 by the annexation of Tuscany to the Kingdom of Sardinia. Present, Catholic continuation claimed by Archduke Sigismund, Grand Duke of Tuscany.

=== Other ===
Chivalric and/or military orders that could qualify depending on definition.

- Confraternity of Belchite, "experimental" confraternity of knights founded in 1122 by King Alfonso the Battler of Aragon
- Order of Saint Blaise, founded in the 12th century in Armenia to defend the country against the attacks of the Muslims
- Knights of the Band, early honorific military order founded c. 1330 by King Alfonso XI of Castile
- Supreme Order of the Most Holy Annunciation, military order founded in 1350 by Duke Amadeus VI, Count of Savoy, the first called the Order of the True Lover's Knots in memory of a bracelet of hair presented to the founder by a lady, but upon the election of Amadeus VIII to the pontificate in 1439, it changed its name for that of the Annunciation of angel Gabriel
- Order of the Dove, short-lived (one year) and controversial order founded in 1379 by King Juan I of Castile
- Order of Saint Anthony (Bavaria), Bavarian military order founded in 1382 by Duke Albert I, Duke of Bavaria
- Military Order of Cross-bearers with the Red Star on a Blue Field, hospitaller and/military order active from the 12th century until suppressed in 1656 by Pope Alexander VII.
- Order of Saint Hubert, early honorific military order founded in 1444 or 1445 by Gerhard VII, Duke of Jülich-Berg
- Blood of Jesus Christ (military order), founded in Mantua, Italy, by Vincenzo I Gonzaga, Duke of Mantua, approved on 25 May 1608 by Pope Paul V
- Order of the Knights of Concórdia, founded in 1261 by King Ferdinand III of Castile
- Order of the Hatchet female Spanish military order during the middle ages.

== Modern development ==
A few of the institutions survived into honorific and/or charitable organizations, including the papal orders of knighthood.

While other contemporary Catholic societies may share some military organizational features and ideology, such as the Society of Jesus, they differ from the medieval military orders in the absence of military purposes or potential.

Modern orders may still be founded explicitly as a military order; the Military Order of Loyalty (Spanish: Orden Militar de la Constancia) was founded in 1946 by the Spanish protectorate in Morocco. Awarded to both Spanish and Moroccan military officers and soldiers, the single-class order was abolished in 1956.

== See also ==
- Spanish knights orders
- Chivalric order
- Order (honour)
- Warrior monk
- Military in Vatican City

== Bibliography ==
- Jotischky, Andrew (2004). Crusading and the Crusader States. Taylor & Francis. ISBN 978-0-582-41851-6.
- Nicholson, Helen J. The Knights Hospitaller (2001).
- Riley-Smith, Jonathan. Hospitallers: The History of the Order of St John (1999).
- Morten, Nicholas Edward. The Teutonic Knights in the Holy Land 1190–1291 (Woodbridge: Boydell Press, 2009)
- Forey, Alan John. The Military Orders: From the Twelfth to the Early Fourteenth Centuries. *(Basingstoke: Macmillan Education, 1992)
- Tyerman, Christopher (2019). The World of the Crusades. Yale University Press. ISBN 978-0-300-21739-1.
