= Siege of Tyre (314 BC) =

By the Antigonids under Demetrius I Poliorcetes

- Part of Wars of the Diadochi
Location
Result
Tyre/ Lebanon
Antigonid victory
Capture of Tyre

Belligerents
Ptolemaic	Antigonid

Commanders and leaders
Ptolemy I Soter	Antigonus I Monophthalmus Demetrius I Poliorcetes

The Siege of Tyre was a military operation that took place in 315–314 BCE during the Wars of the Diadochi. The engagement occurred in Phoenicia, at the heavily fortified port city of Tyre, between an Antigonid force led by Antigonus I Monophthalmus and Ptolemaic-aligned forces under the authority of Ptolemy I Soter. It concluded with Antigonid control over the city as part of his wider campaign in the Levant, strengthening his position against Ptolemaic influence along the eastern Mediterranean coast and contributing to the shifting balance of power among the Diadochi.

== Background ==
In the years immediately after Alexander the Great's death, the Ptolemaic Kingdom secured control of Egypt and subsequently extended his influence into the Levant, establishing a network of coastal garrisons intended to secure maritime access and strategic depth. The port of Tyre gave an advantage for Ptolemy I Soter to project his power into Syria and Phoenicia and the eastern Mediterranean coast. Among these positions, Tyre held exceptional strategic importance. As a heavily fortified island-city with a major harbor, it functioned as a key naval base for the Ptolemaic fleet, enabling control over shipping routes between Egypt, Cyprus, and the Levant.

== Siege ==
=== Course ===
At the start of the campaigning season of 314 BC, Antigonus I Monophthalmus launched an invasion of Syria and Phoenicia, which were at that time under the control of Ptolemy I Soter. His objective was to dismantle the Ptolemaic presence along the Levantine coast and secure key ports for himself during the ongoing Wars of the Diadochi. Among the most important targets was Tyre, a heavily fortified island city that served as a major Ptolemaic naval base, controlling maritime routes between Egypt, Cyprus, and the wider eastern Mediterranean, while also restricting Antigonid access to the coast.

The siege of Tyre began as Antigonid forces under Demetrius I Poliorcetes moved to isolate the city by securing surrounding territory and cutting it off from effective relief. Over the course of the siege, which lasted from 315 to 314 BC, Tyre's strong fortifications and partial access to the sea allowed it to resist immediate capture, forcing the conflict into a prolonged blockade and war of attrition. Gradually, however, continued isolation and pressure undermined the city's ability to sustain resistance. By the end of the siege in 314 BC, Tyre was compelled to submit, and control of the city passed to the Antigonids, marking a significant strategic gain in their campaign to dominate Syria.
