= Order of Mountjoy =

Historical military order during the Crusades

Order of Mountjoy Orden de Monte Gaudio
- The order emblem
- Type: Catholic military order
- Religious affiliation: Catholic

The Order of Mountjoy (Spanish: Orden de Monte Gaudio, also known as the Order of Trufac) was a military order during the crusades.

The order of Montjoie is mentioned in the 13th century as having been founded for the purpose of protecting Christian pilgrims in Iberian Peninsula. Established c. 1180, it was merged with the Order of Calatrava in 1221.

The order was founded by Galician count Rodrigo Álvarez in the kingdom of Aragon, specifically in the castle of Alfambra in 1174, and then established in the Holy Land at the time of the Third Crusade.

Rodrigo was from the order of Santiago, and had already established the order in Castile and Aragon before establishing it in the kingdom of Jerusalem in the tower of Ascalon. The headquarters of the order in Jerusalem was situated on Montjoie, the hill where the original crusaders had first seen Jerusalem, hence its name ("mountain of joy", mons gaudii in Latin, Mont de joie in French, contracted in Montjoie).

The rule of the order was adapted from the Cistercian rule, and was entirely a Spanish order. The emblem of the order was a red and white cross.

A number of knights from the order fought at the Battle of Hattin in 1187, but none of them survived. Discontentment with the leadership of the master Fralmo in 1196 led to the establishment of a new Order of Monfragüe in Castile while the Aragonese element of the order was merged with Templars. In 1221 Ferdinand III of Castile joined the order of Monfragüe to the Order of Calatrava. The Order of Montesa, established 1317, was inspired partly by the suggestion to re-establish Montjoie after the suppression of the Templars.

== Bibliography ==
- Blázquez, A. (1917). "Bosquejo histórico de la Orden de Monte Gaudio". Boletín de la Real Academia de la Historia, 71:138–72.
- Canal Sánchez-Pagín, José María (1983). "El conde don Rodrigo Álvarez de Sarria, fundador de la orden militar de Monte Gaudio". Compostellanum, 28:373–97.
- Delaville Le Roulx, J. (1893). "L'Ordre de Monjoye". Revue de l'Orient Latin, 1:42–57.
- Forey, Alan J. (1971). "The Order of Mountjoy". Speculum, 46(2):250–66.
- O'Callaghan, Joseph F. (1969). "Hermandades between the Military Orders of Calatrava and Santiago during the Castilian Reconquest, 1158–1252". Speculum, 44(4):609–18.
