= Siege of Hama (1130) =

Date	1130
Location	Hama
Result	Zengid victory

Belligerents
Zengids	Burids

Commanders and leaders
Imad al-Din Zengi	Sawinj of Hama

Strength
Unknown	500 elite knights

Casualties and losses
Unknown	Unknown

The siege of Hama was led by Imad al-Din Zengi who besieged and captured the city of Hama, then held by the Burids.

At the beginning of 1130 Zengi desired to gain political legitimacy in Syria, as a result he married the daughter of the former ruler of Aleppo. This move may have given him prestige over the Damascene Burids whom Zengi had sent several messages to inviting them to join him in a jihad against the Crusaders.

When Buri overcame his doubts about Zengi he sent his son Sawinj, lord of Hama, in command of 500 elite knights. The warm welcome and hospitality of Zengi banished any doubts and mistrust that Sawinj and his commanders may have had. Three days later Zengi had Sawinj and his commanders arrested and imprisoned in Aleppo. Zengi managed to loot the camp of Sawinj and confiscate all of his weapons, he then laid siege to Hama and captured it in October 1130.
