= Siege of Aleppo (1138) =

12th c. military conflict

- Part of the Crusades
Date	April 1138
Location	Aleppo, Syria
Result	Zengid victory

Belligerents
Byzantine Empire; Principality of Antioch; County of Edessa; Knights Templar	Zengids; Artuqids

Commanders and leaders
John II Komnenos; Raymond of Poitiers; Joscelin II	Imad al-Din Zengi; Kara Arslan

Strength
Unknown	Unknown

Casualties and losses
Unknown	Unknown

The siege of Aleppo in April 1138 was a significant attempt to capture the city by the allied forces of the Byzantines and the Franks.

The Byzantine Emperor John II Komnenos allied with the Franks in an attempt to capture Aleppo. The Christian army was largely composed of Byzantine regulars and also included a Knights Templar force and substantial contingents from Antioch and Edessa. As the Christian army approached Aleppo its inhabitants withdrew into the outlying garrisons and sent word to Zengi, asking him for help. Zengi rushed to obtain reinforcements before the arrival of the allied army; he received a reinforcement of cavalry, infantry, and specialist archers just in time.

The Byzantines were aware of the strategic importance of Aleppo. One of the objectives of their Syrian campaign was to create a buffer state centered on Aleppo but also including Shaizar, Homs and Hama. The Byzantines were content to let the Franks own the buffer state of the hinterlands, presumably under imperial suzerainty.

The Byzantines were camped on Queiq river and launched attacks on the south and west of Aleppo on 19 April to size out the garrison's strength and intimidate them with the size and aggression of the besieging force. Instead the reverse happened: large numbers of the Muslim militia made a sortie against the Byzantines and emerged victorious from the skirmishing. One of the senior Byzantine commanders was wounded during the fight. Following their repulse, the Christian army departed in search of easier pickings. The siege is hardly mentioned in Christian chronicles, and while Aleppo might have been viewed as a target if its defenses had been weak, there is evidence that Shaizar was the real goal of the allied army. After taking some towns by assault, John II's army unsuccessfully besieged Shaizar.

== Sources ==
- Morton, Nicholas (2020). The Crusader States and Their Neighbours: A Military History, 1099-1187. Oxford University Press. ISBN 9780198824541.
- Tibble, Steve (2020). The Crusader Strategy: Defending the Holy Land. Yale University Press. doi:10.12987/yale/9780300253115.003.0004. ISBN 9780300253115.
