= Battle of al-Atharib =

12th c. military conflict

| Date | Spring 1130 |
| Location | al-Atharib, Syria |
| Result | Zengid victory |

Belligerents
| Zengids | Kingdom of Jerusalem; Principality of Antioch |

Commanders and leaders
| Imad al-Din Zengi | Baldwin II of Jerusalem |

Strength
| Unknown | Unknown |

Casualties and losses
| Unknown | Unknown |

The Battle of al-Atharib occurred in 1130 when Imad al-Din Zengi laid siege to al-Atharib in spring and defeated an army led against him to relieve the town commanded by King Baldwin.

Imad al-Din Zengi sought to reassert Muslim control over the eastern frontier of the Principality of Antioch. Zengi invaded and raided the territories of Antioch; in the Spring of 1130, he laid siege to al-Atharib.

When the Franks and King Baldwin, who was in command of a Latin army, advanced to relieve the city, the officers of Zengi advised him to retreat; however, Baldwin scorned their advice. A battle followed and Zengi emerged victorious. After conquering the citadel of al-Atharib, Zengi destroyed it and razed it to the ground.

Zengi then advanced on the fortress of Harim but its inhabitants persuaded him to abandon his siege in return for half of the districts revenues. A truce was concluded and Zengi returned to his territories.
