= Battle of Beirut (1383) =

- Part of Mamluk–Genoese War (1383–1385)
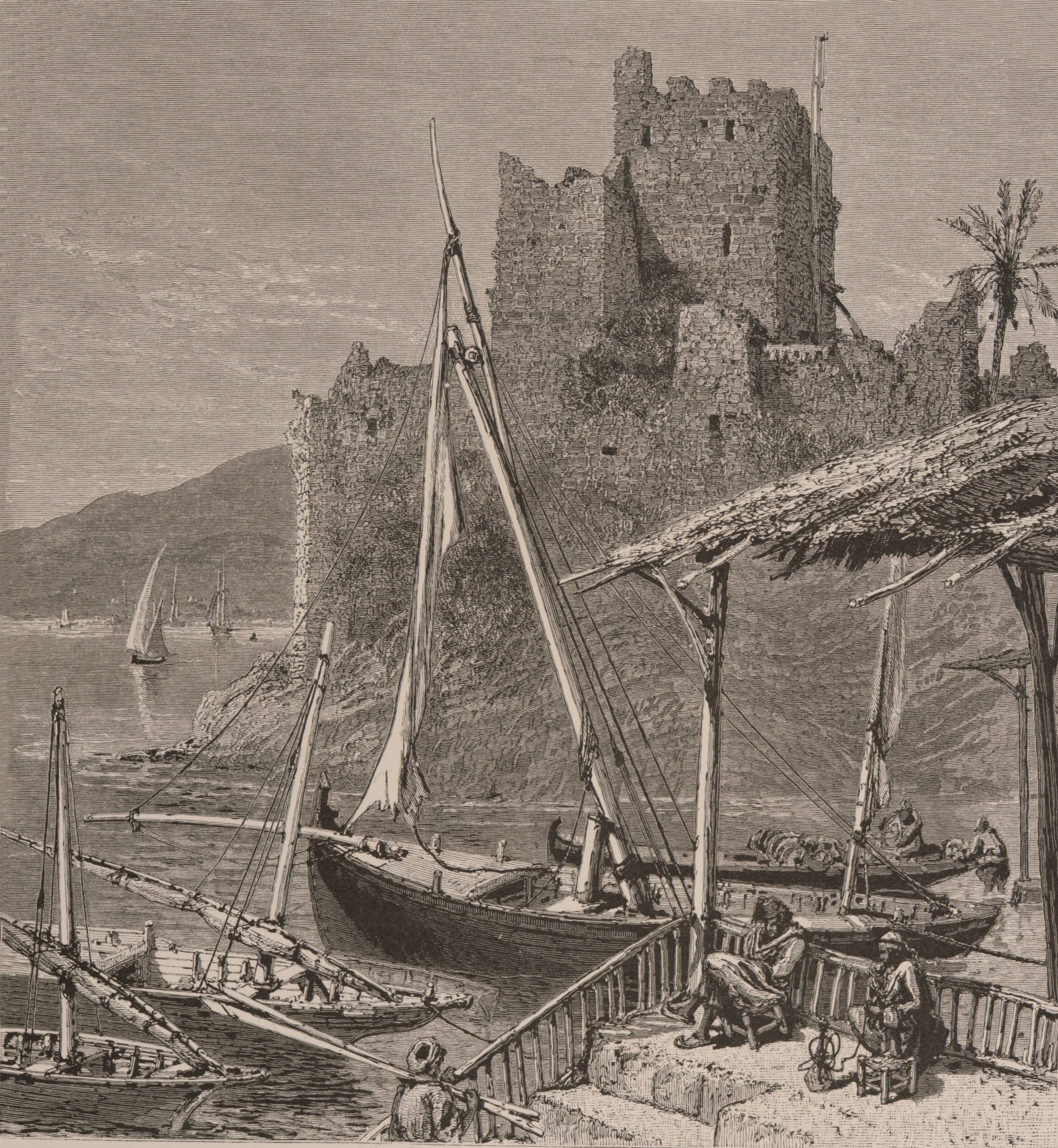
- Beirut citadel, where the Genoese attempted to plant their flag there.
Date	August–October 1383
Location	Beirut, Lebanon
Result	Mamluk victory

Belligerents
Republic of Genoa	Mamluk Sultanate

Commanders and leaders
Niccolò Maruffo	Sayf al-Din Yahya

Strength
12 galleys	Unknown

Casualties and losses
Heavy	Unknown

The Battle of Beirut was a military engagement between the Genoese, who raided Beirut, and the Mamluks. The battle ended in Mamluk victory with the Genoese defeated twice.

== Background ==
In late 1381 or early 1382, news reached Genoa that their Italian merchants and consuls were beaten and imprisoned in Alexandria, Damascus, and elsewhere. Genoa dispatched their own embassy for answers. Departing on March 1382 and arriving in May in Egypt. During their embassy, the Genoese travelled to Beirut and Famagusta, which perhaps was to establish contact with the Mamluk governor of Damascus to help with against the Mamluk Sultan. On May 1383, Leonardo Montaldo became the new Doge of Genoa. He dispatched two ships to Damascus to negotiate with its governor. At the time of their arrival, a new conflict happened in Alexandria between Genoese merchants and locals, leading them to flee the city. Those who remained were imprisoned.

The Genoese government in Famagusta retaliated by attacking an Egyptian coastal town, Altina, and capturing some Muslims. This ended the negotiations led to a declaration of war between them. In the meantime, 10 Genoese galleys under Niccolò Maruffo arrived in Cyprus and were ordered to attack Egypt's coast, but instead he went to attack the Levant.

== Battle ==
On August 1383, the Genoese attacked the city of Sidon and sacked it. They then arrived in Beirut; however, discovering that the city was well defended, the Genoese departed to Cyprus and returned with 2 more galleys. The Mamluks dispatched troops to Beirut but left a detachment there after learning of the Genoese departure. The Genoese attacked Beirut's harbor and managed to capture 2 Venetian ships. They penetrated the harbor further and began bombarding the small tower with catapults using stones and fire darts. Because of this, the Mamluk defenders hid behind the walls.

Genoese detachments began landing, and the first of them carried the flag and went towards an old Crusader citadel. They planted their flag there as a sign that they captured the city. The Mamluk defenders were led by Sayf al-Din Yahya. Seeing the flag was planted, Yahya charged against the Genoese with his men and killed the flag bearer and pushed back the Genoese with vigour. Seeing the flag had fallen, the Genoese retreated to their ships. Many of them drowned trying to reach their ships due to heavy armor.

In October of the same year, the Genoese re-attempted to attack Beirut but were repelled once again.

== Aftermath ==
The war between the Mamluks and Genoa continued until 1385, when both sides ceased hostilities and made a peace treaty. Another peace treaty would be signed in 1386. However, conflicts between both nations would resume later on.

== Sources ==
- Eliyahu Ashtor (2014), Levant Trade in the Middle Ages.
- Nejla M. Abu-Izzeddin (2024), The Druzes, A New Study of Their History, Faith and Society.
- Albrecht Fuess (2021), Burnt shore; effects of Mamluk maritime policy on Beirut and the Syro-Palestinian coast (1250-1517).
