= Quintus Caecilius Bassus =

Roman equestrian (fl. 1st century BC)

Quintus Caecilius Bassus (fl. 1st century BC) was a Roman equestrian who fought during Caesar's civil war under Pompey before the Battle of Pharsalus. After the battle, he commandeered two mutinous legions in Syria and defended against a Caesarian siege at Apamea. There, he negotiated with Deiotarus, the king of Galatia, and the Parthians. After Caesar's death, both his men and those of his besiegers defected to Gaius Cassius Longinus; Bassus was then dismissed unharmed. He then disappears from history, possibly dying during the Battle of Philippi.

His opposition to Caesar in late 45 BC, after the defeat of Gnaeus Pompey at the Battle of Munda, marked him as one of the last open combatants of the civil war.

== See also ==
- Caesar's Civil War
