= Battle of Rafaniyya =

Date	October 1133
Location	Rafaniyya, Syria
Result	Zengid victory

Belligerents
Zengids	County of Tripoli; Kingdom of Jerusalem

Commanders and leaders
Imad al-Din Zengi	Count Pons; King Fulk

Strength
Unknown	Unknown

Casualties and losses
Unknown	Heavy losses, few survived

The Battle of Rafaniyya occurred in 1133 when Imad al-Din Zengi raided the County of Tripoli, and Count Pons and met him in battle near Rafaniyya.

On October 1133, a large force of Zengid Turks from north invaded the County of Tripoli, including Tripoli and some neighbouring towns. They ravaged the countryside, killing many Christians and seizing large amounts of loot and cattle. Pons led an army to meet the Zengids, who were near Rafaniyya. Initially, the Zengids avoided battle and Pons chased them, but the Zengids turned back and fought the Crusaders, inflicting a heavy defeat on Pons's army. Few of the Crusaders survived the battle.

Pons and his few men retreated towards Montferrand. The Zengids chased them and besieged the castle. Pons managed to slip from the castle with 20 men and head towards Tripoli, where he sent a letter to King Fulk of Jerusalem to send a relief force. His call was quickly answered, and Fulk sent a force to meet the Zengids. Hearing this, the Zengids marched to meet the Crusader force, and in a heavy battle, both sides suffered severe casualties, and the Crusaders were almost defeated. The battle ended in stalemate when the Crusaders retreated towards Rafaniyya while the Zengids withdrew to their territory.
