= Battle of Beirut (1126) =

- Part of the Crusades
Date	Summer 1126
Location	Beirut, Kingdom of Jerusalem
Result	Crusader victory

Belligerents
Kingdom of Jerusalem	Fatimid Caliphate

Commanders and leaders
Baldwin II of Jerusalem	Unknown

Strength
Unknown	22–24 galleys 53 support ships

Casualties and losses
Unknown	130 killed

The Battle of Beirut was a military engagement between the Crusaders and the Fatimids at Beirut. The Fatimid navy stopped at Beirut for water; however, they were quickly routed by the garrison at Beirut.

== Background ==
In the spring of 1126 King Baldwin II of Jerusalem heard rumors of an upcoming invasion by the Fatimids, which gave him a reason to return to Tyre. If Toghtekin was to cooperate with the Fatimids, he would have to compromise both land and naval forces. Baldwin was organizing defenses when a messenger from Antioch reported that the Turks were invading Principality of Antioch. Baldwin decided to divide his forces, leaving some on the coast with the rest to meet the Turks.

== Battle ==
The Fatimids sent a squadron north to raid the Crusaders. They passed by several coastal cities held by the Crusaders. The navy was exploring and waiting as far as Beirut, hoping to catch an opportunity to cause damage to the Crusaders. The navy was unsupported by land forces and was unable to take supplies anywhere north of Ascalon. The Fatimids began to suffer from thirst due to a lack of fresh water. They were forced to land to fetch waters from streams and springs. They landed near Beirut.

The Crusader garrison of Beirut, consisting of the population and pilgrims, was watching the Fatimids and launched a sortie with knights and bowmen. The Crusaders routed the Fatimids and drove them to the sea, killing many sailors while others died from arrow wounds as they were running to boats.

== Aftermath ==
The battle was the last attempt by the Fatimids to mount an offensive against the Crusaders, and its end proved that Antioch's threat was very important to focus on.
