= Battle of Qinnasrin =

Battle

Date	1135
Location	Qinnasrin
Result	Zengid victory

Belligerents
Zengids	County of Tripoli

Commanders and leaders
Imad al-Din Zengi	Pons of Tripoli

Strength
Unknown	Unknown

Casualties and losses
Unknown	Unknown

The Battle of Qinnasrin took place between the Zengids and the County of Tripoli following a successful campaign against Antioch led by Imad al-Din Zengi.

In 1135 Imad al-Din Zengi led a campaign against Antioch during which he captured Atharib, Zardana, Tell Aghdi, Ma’arat al-Nu’man, Ma’arrat Misrin and Kafartab.

The Count of Tripoli, Pons, in an attempt to make up for the loss of Ma’arat al-Nu’man and block the road that crossed Syria from north to south, launched an attack on Qinnasrin, however Zengi repelled the attack and the Franks retreated.

== Sources ==
- Gurinov, Evgeniy A. (2021). "The Frankish Campaign of 1133–1134 in Northern Syria and the Battle of Qinnasrīn". Journal of Medieval Military History. XIX. Woodbridge: The Boydell Press: 43–55. ISBN 978-1-78327-591-5. ISSN 1477-545X.
