= Orders, decorations, and medals of Spain =

This is a list of some of the modern orders, decorations and medals of Spain.

The majority of the top civil and military decorations currently granted by the Government of Spain on a discretionary basis can be traced back to the 19th and 20th centuries. The military orders, a series of religious-military institutions created during the Middle Ages for military and borderland repopulation purposes in the Iberian Christian kingdoms, were brought under the control of the Crown from the late 15th to early 16th century. Since then, Spanish monarchs have been grand masters of the orders, which enables them to award individuals with the habits of the former as an honor.

Provincial and municipal corporations (diputaciones and ayuntamientos) have a tradition for granting medals, and "adoptive" and "predilect" son/daughter as honorific titles. After the creation of autonomous communities in the late 20th century, regional administrations have also created their own set of civil decorations.

== Historical orders of chivalry ==
Badges of the Order of Santiago (top), the Order of Calatrava (left), the Order of Montesa (bottom) and the Order of Alcántara (right)

The Spanish military orders or Spanish Medieval knights orders are a set of religious-military institutions that emerged during the Reconquista. The most important orders arose in the 12th century in the Crowns of León and Castile (Order of Santiago, Order of Alcántara, and Order of Calatrava) and in the 14th century in the Crown of Aragon (Order of Montesa). These orders were preceded by many others that did not survive, such as the Aragonese Militia Christi of Alfonso of Aragon and Navarre, the Confraternity of Belchite (founded in 1122), or the Military order of Monreal (founded in 1124), which were later refurbished by Alfonso VII of León and Castile. After the refurbishment, these orders took the name of Cesaraugustana and were integrated into the Knights Templar in 1149 with Ramon Berenguer IV, Count of Barcelona. The Portuguese Order of Aviz responded to identical circumstances in the remaining peninsular Christian kingdom.

During the Middle Ages, native Military orders appeared in the Iberian Peninsula, sharing many similarities with other international Military orders but also possessing unique peculiarities due to the peninsular's historical circumstances marked by the confrontation between Muslim and Christian forces.

The birth and expansion of these native orders occurred mainly during the Reconquista's stages in which territories south of the Ebro and Tagus were occupied. As a result, their presence in areas such as La Mancha, Extremadura, and Sistema Ibérico (Campo de Calatrava, Maestrazgo, etc.) came to define the main feature of Repoblación, with each Order exercising a political and economic role similar to that of a feudal manor through their encomiendas. Simultaneously, the presence of foreign military orders such as the Templar or the Saint John was notable. However, the suppression of the Knights Templar in the 14th century benefited Spain significantly.

The military orders' social implementation among noble families was significant, extending even through related female orders such as Comendadoras de Santiago and others similar.

After the turbulent period of the late medieval crisis—in which the position of Grand Master of the orders was the subject of violent disputes between the aristocracy, the monarchy and the favourites (infantes of Aragon, Álvaro de Luna, etc.)—Ferdinand II of Aragon, in the late 15th century, managed to neutralize the orders politically to obtain the papal concession of the unification in the person of that position for all of them, and its joint inheritance for its heirs, the kings of the later Catholic Monarchy, that administered through the Royal Council of the Military Orders.

Gradually losing any military function along the Antiguo Régimen, the territorial wealth of the military orders was the subject of confiscation in the 19th century, which reduced the orders thereafter to the social function of representing, as honorary positions, an aspect of noble status.

=== Birth and evolution ===
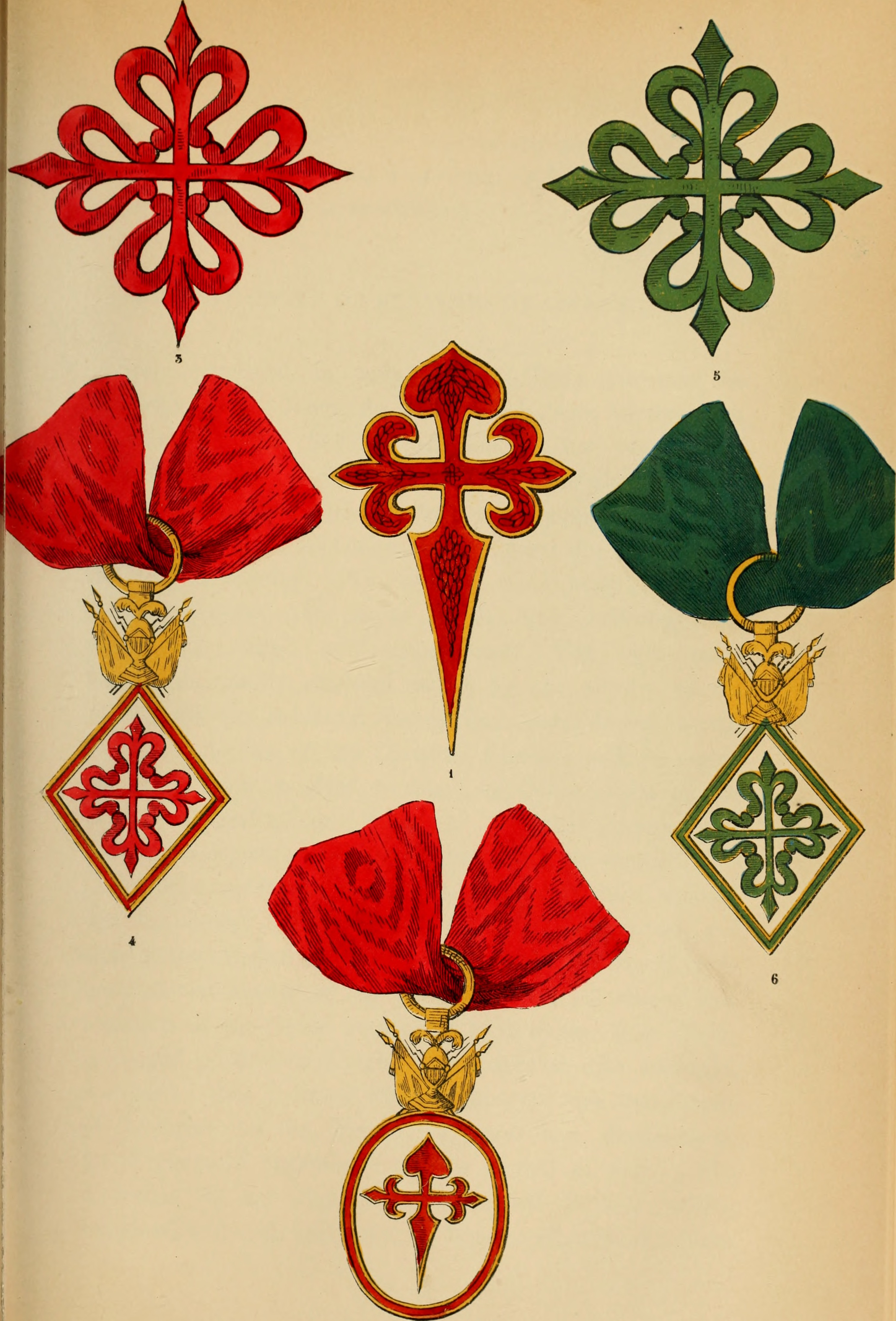
The Order of Calatrava (left), the Order of Santiago (centre) and the Order of Alcántara (right) in The book of orders of knighthood and decorations of honour of all nations, 1858

Although the appearance of the Hispanic military orders can be interpreted as pure imitation of the international arisen following the Crusades, both its birth and its subsequent evolution have distinctive features, as they played a leading role in the struggle of Christian kingdoms against the Muslims, in the repopulation of large territories, especially between the Tagus and the Guadalquivir and became a political and economic force of the first magnitude, besides having great role in the noble struggles held between the 13th and 15th centuries, when finally the Catholic Monarchs managed to gain its control.

For the Arabists, the birth of the Spanish military orders was inspired by the Muslims' ribat, but other authors believe that its appearance was the result of a merger of confraternities and council militias tinged with religiosity, by absorption and concentration gave rise to the large orders at a time when the struggle against Almohad power required every effort by the Christian side.

Traditionally it is accepted that the first to appear was that of Order of Calatrava, born in that village of the Castilian kingdom in 1158, followed by that of Order of Santiago, founded in Cáceres, in the Leonese kingdom, in 1170. Six years later was created the Order of Alcántara, initially called ¨of San Julián del Pereiro¨. The last to appear was the Order of Montesa it did later on, during the 14th century, in the Crown of Aragon due to the dissolution of the Order of the Templar.

=== Hierarchical organization ===
Imitating the international orders, the Spanish adopted their organization. The master was the highest authority of the order, with almost absolute power, both militarily, and politically or religiously. It was chosen by the council, made up of thirteen friars, where it comes to its components the name of "Thirteens". The office of Master is life-time and in his death, the Thirteen, convened by the greater prior of the order, choose the new. It should be the removal of the master by incapacity or pernicious conduct for the order. To carry out it needed the agreement of its governing bodies: council of the thirteen, "greater prior" and "greater convent".

The General Chapter is a kind of representative assembly that controls the entire order. What are the thirteen, the priors of all the convents and all commanders. It should meet annually a certain day in the greater convent, although in the practice these meetings were held where and when the master wanted.

In each kingdom was a "greater commander", based in a town or fortress. The priors of each convent were elected by the canons, because it must bear in mind that within the orders were freyles milites (knights) and freyles clérigos, professed monks who taught and administering the sacraments.

=== Territorial organization ===
Territories of the military orders of the Iberian kingdoms towards the end of 15th century: Order of Montesa Order of Santiago Order of Calatrava Order of Saint John (Castile) Order of Alcántara Order of Sant'Iago da Espada Order of Aviz Order of Saint John (Portugal) Residence of the Grand Master

Due to their dual nature as both military and religious institutions, the orders developed separate double organizations for each of these areas, though they were not always completely detached.

In the political-military area, the orders were divided into "major encomiendas", with each peninsular kingdom having a greater encomienda in which the order was present. The main commander was in charge of them. Below the major encomiendas were the encomiendas, which were a collection of goods, not always territorial or grouped, but generally constituted territorial demarcations. The encomiendas were administered by a commander. The fortresses not under the command of the commander were headed by an alcaide appointed by him.

Religiously, the orders were organized by convents, with a main convent serving as the headquarters of the order. The Order of Santiago was based in Uclés, following the rifts of the order with the Leonese monarch Ferdinand II. The Order of Alcántara was based in the Extremaduran village that gave it its name.

The convents were not only places where the professed monks lived, but also constituted priories, religious territorial demarcations where the respective priors had the same powers as the bishoprics, resulting in the military orders being removed from the episcopal power in extensive territories.

=== Army ===
The command of the army was exercised by the highest dignitaries of each order. At the apex was the master, followed by the main commanders. The figure of alférez was highlighted at the beginning, but in the Middle Ages it had disappeared. The command of the fortresses was in the hands of the commander or an alcaide appointed by him.

Recruitment was done through encomiendas, with each presumably contributing a number of lances or men related to the economic value of the demarcation.

Of note is the surprising bellicosity of the orders and their rigorous promise to fight the infidel, which often manifested itself in the continuation of authentic "private wars" against the Muslims when, for various reasons, the Christian kings gave up the struggle. This was due to signing truces or directing their military actions in other ways, as was the case when Ferdinand III of Castile, crowned king of León, abandoned the interests of this kingdom to pursue the conquest of Andalusia in favor of the Crown of Castile.

=== Repopulation and social policy ===
The military orders played an important role not only in military affairs, but also in repopulation, economic growth, and social development. Simply conquering territory was not enough; it was also necessary to attract settlers and develop the land for defense and economic purposes.

The orders received vast tracts of land, which they used to gain political and economic power through repopulation efforts. They employed various methods to attract people to the newly acquired lands, such as granting generous fueros (legal codes) to villages under their jurisdiction. They often modeled their fueros on more generous ones, like those of Cáceres and Sepúlveda. The tax exemptions by marriage from the Fuero of Usagre were also implemented.

In addition, the orders sought to develop unproductive lands. To this end, they provided incentives for new settlers, such as donations of public lands and the organization of fairs. They also undertook significant infrastructure projects to improve communication networks, such as building bridges and roads, which in turn facilitated trade. The tax-free nature of the fairs was particularly attractive to merchants and helped stimulate economic growth in the region.

=== Relations with other institutions ===
The Hispanic military orders had diverse relationships with other powers and institutions. They generally received support from the papacy, as they constituted a strong foundation for the reconquest and directly depended on its authority. The Popes granted episcopal authority to the priors of the orders in their conflict with the bishops, providing them greater independence.

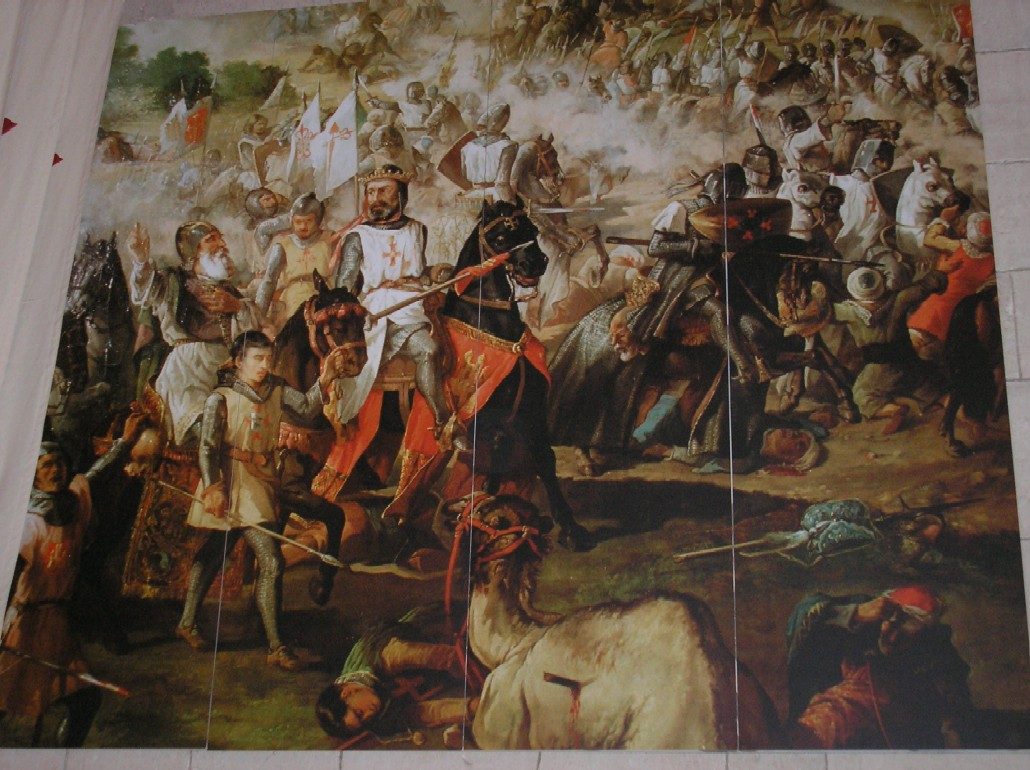
Scene of the Reconquista by the military orders at Monasterio de Uclés in Cuenca, Spain

The relationship between the Hispanic military orders and other powers and institutions underwent several changes during different stages. Initially, monarchs recognized the potential of the orders in the reconquest and repopulation tasks and saw them as the "most precious jewel" of their crowns. Kings such as Alfonso of Aragon and Navarre and Alfonso VIII of Castile enticed the orders to their kingdoms by offering possessions and territories. Besides military or political donations, kings also granted tax privileges and favored the orders in numerous lawsuits with other powers. In return, the orders were loyal to the monarchs and carried out the missions entrusted to them. However, with the increasing power of the orders, monarchs such as Alfonso XI of Castile began a struggle to gain control through the designation of the master. This struggle continued until the Catholic Monarchs achieved absolute control over the orders' mastership, which became hereditary.

The relationship between the orders and the concejos of realengo, especially those endowed with extensive domains of difficult control and occupation, was problematic. The orders often preyed upon unpopulated areas until the kings put an end to their usurpations. However, from the 14th century, these councils suffered the same predation by lay lords. Disputes with neighbors also led to prolonged and even physical confrontations.

The relationship with the rest of the clergy was equally diverse. While some clergy supported the orders, there were also endless lawsuits and skirmishes, such as the attack on the bishops of Cuenca and Sigüenza by the Santiago's commander of Uclés. Tensions with the bishops were frequent in the struggle for ecclesiastical jurisdiction, which were subtracted from the priors, who finally received papal support.

The orders maintained brotherhood and coordination in their relations with each other. Calatrava and Alcántara were united by relations of affiliation without incurring a lack of autonomy of Alcántara. The orders had agreements for mutual aid and sharing of archives. For instance, the tripartite agreement of friendship, mutual defense, coordination, and centralization was signed in 1313 by Santiago, Calatrava, and Alcántara.

=== Dissolution ===
The Military Orders were dissolved on April 29 of 1931 by the Republican government.

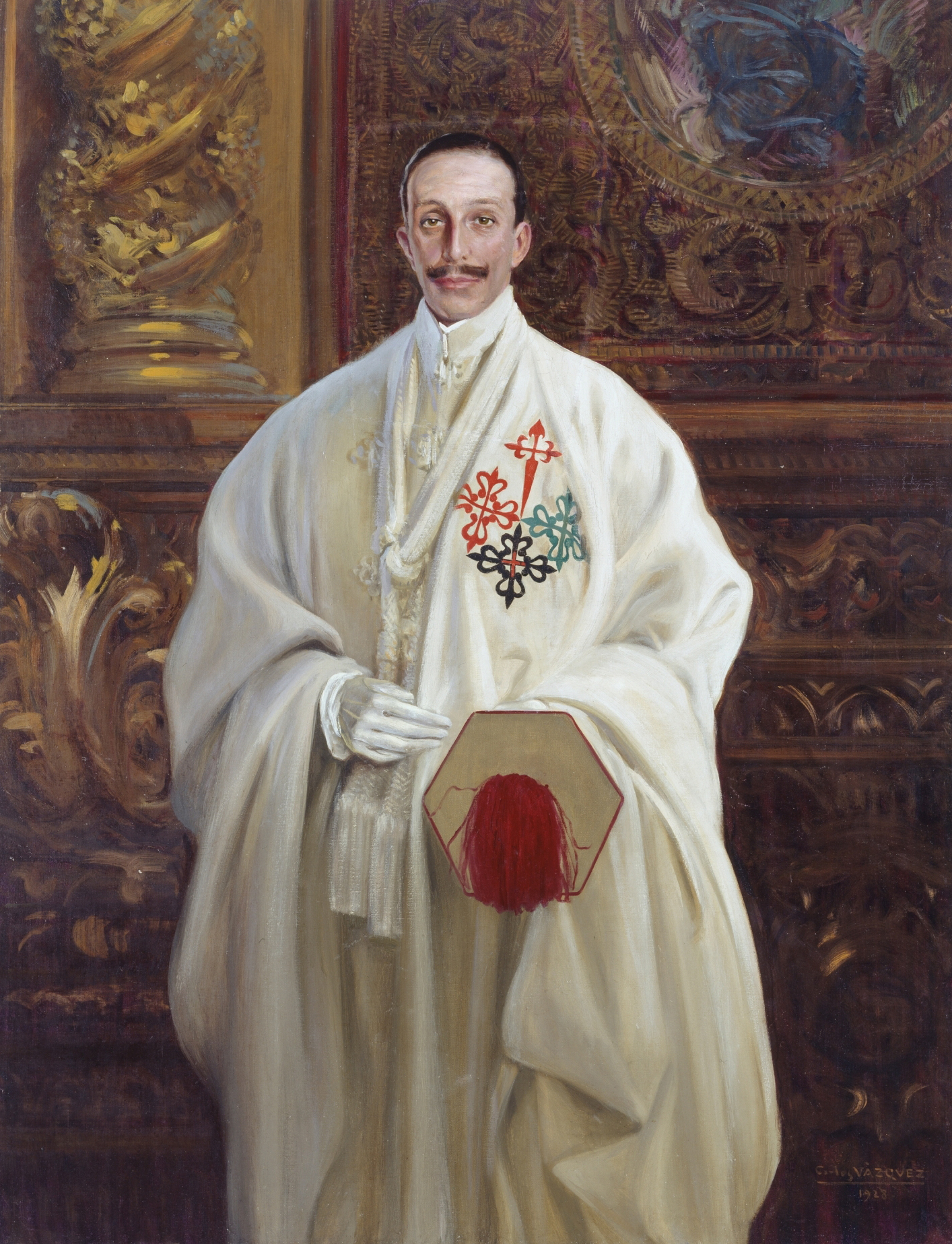
Portrait of Alfonso XIII in uniform of Grand Master of the four Spanish military orders, 1928

During the Spanish Civil War, many non-militant, non-criminal, civilian leading members of the Orders were killed, their knights in the crosshairs of ideological revolutionists, put to death for revolutionary agendas: minimally, at least nineteen of the Military Order of Santiago, fifteen of the Military Order of Calatrava, five of the Military Order of Alcántara and four of the Military Order of Montesa were executed. These numbers are conservative in fact and unconfirmed, but doubtless, ideologically-inspired killings of those with serious ties to these Orders, existed beyond official recorded numbers – regardless of class, any persons intimately associated with these pre-modern Orders were targets of revolutionary assassinations and the death-toll was likely higher.

The "officially" tabulated balance of Knights of 1931 to 1935 in the midst of the chaos was as follows:

- Military Order of Santiago, 68 of 116.
- Military Order of Calatrava, 89 of 139.
- Military Order of Alcántara, 19 of 42.
- Military Order of Montesa, 51 of 70.

In 1985 only 19 documentation-verified knights, who professed a dedication before approximately 1931, remained of what was once a grand edifice of social significance to Spanish and greater European society.

=== Revival ===
After the Spanish Civil War, negotiations began with Franco, the caudillo whose social policy aimed to synthesize modernity with traditional elements of redeeming value. He invited Bishop-Prior Emeterio Echeverría Barrena to an exchange, but it was unproductive, and the Order subsisted marginally or informally over the following years. It was not until April 2, 1980, when they were officially recorded as an association by the Civil Government of Madrid. On May 26 of the same year, they were registered as a federation. The Order of Santiago, along with Calatrava, Alcántara, and Montesa, were reinstated as civil associations during the reign of Juan Carlos I, as honorable and religious noble organizations, which they remain today.

On April 9, 1981, after fifty years, Juan Carlos I named his father, Infante Juan of Bourbon, President of the Royal Council of the Military Orders. Currently, As of April 28, 2014, the position of President of the Royal Council is held by Don Pedro of Bourbon, Duke of Noto.

=== List ===
Medieval knights orders founded in Spain (arranged in alphabetic order) (Note: This list, at this moment, does not include the military orders of the rest of Europe that participated in the Reconquista, among which for example the Knights Templar and the Knights Hospitaller would feature)

Emblem	Name	Founded	Founder	Origin	Recognition	Protection/Collaboration
	Order of Alcántara	1154	Suero Fernández Barrientos	Alcántara, Extremadura (Kingdom of León)	December 29, 1177 by Pope Alexander III, 1183 by Pope Lucius III	Grand Master (1156– ), Kingdom of León (1177– ), Kingdom of Castile (1177– ), Kingdom of Spain (1980– )
	Order of the Band	1332	Alfonso XI of Castile	Burgos, Castile and León (Kingdom of Castile and León)		Kingdom of Castile and León (1332– )
	Confraternity of Belchite	1122	Alfonso I of Aragon and Navarre	Belchite, Aragon (Kingdom of Aragon)		Kingdom of Aragon (1122– ), Kingdom of Castile (1136– )
	Order of Brothers Hospitallers of Burgos	1212	Alfonso VII of León and Castile	Burgos, Castile and León (Kingdom of León, Castile and Galicia) and Corcubión, Galicia (Kingdom of León, Castile and Galicia)		Kingdom of León, Castile and Galicia (1212– )
	Order of Calatrava	1158	Raimundo of Fitero	Calatrava la Vieja, Castile-La Mancha (Kingdom of Castile) and Calzada de Calatrava, Castile-La Mancha (Kingdom of Castile)	September 25, 1164 by Pope Alexander III, Pope Gregory VIII, Pope Innocent III	Kingdom of Castile (1158– ), Kingdom of Aragon (1179– )
	Order of the Ermine	1436	Alfonso V of Aragon			Crown of Aragon (1436– )
	Order of the Jar and the Griffin	1040	García Sánchez III of Navarre	Nájera, La Rioja (Kingdom of Navarre)		Kingdom of Navarre (1040– ) Crown of Aragon (14th c.– )
	Order of Monreal	1124	Alfonso I of Aragon and Navarre	Monreal del Campo, Aragon (Kingdom of Aragon)	March 30, 1150 by Pope Eugene III	Kingdom of Aragon (1124– ) Kingdom of León, Castile and Galicia (1136– )
	Order of Montesa	1317	James II of Aragon	Montesa, Valencian Community (Crown of Aragon)	1317 by Pope John XXII, Antipope Clement VII	Crown of Aragon (1317– ), Kingdom of Spain (1980– )
	Order of Mountjoy	1143–1163	Galician Count Rodrigo Álvarez de Sarria	Alfambra, Aragon (Kingdom of Aragon)	December 24, 1173 by Pope Alexander III, 1197 by Pope Celestine III	Kingdom of Aragon (1174– ), Kingdom of Castile (1174– ), Orders of the Crusades (1174– ), Kingdom of Jerusalem (1176– )
	Order of the Dove	1379	John I of Castile	Segovia, Castile and León (Crown of Castile)		Crown of Castile (1379– )
	Order of the Reason	1385	John I of Castile			Crown of Castile (1385–)
	Order of Saint George of Alfama	1201	Peter II of Aragon	Former dessert of Alfama near Tortosa, Catalonia (Crown of Aragon)		Crown of Aragon (1201– ), Kingdom of Castile (1212–)
	Order of Santiago	1151	Ferdinand II of León and Pedro Suárez de Deza	Uclés, Castile-La Mancha (Kingdom of Castile) and León, Castile and León (Kingdom of León)	July 5, 1175 by Pope Alexander III, Pope Urban III, Pope Innocent III	Kingdom of León (1158– ), Kingdom of Castile (1158– )
	Order of the Scale	1318/ 1420	Alfonso XI of Castile			Crown of Castile (1318–)

Female orders

Most were honorific orders in payment of efforts by warrior girls attacking Muslims (and in some cases attacking English), and their high contribution to the reconquest of cities, some however came to become actually in female military orders.

Emblem	Name	Founded	Founder	Origin	Recognition	Protection
	Female order of the Band	1387	John I of Castile	Palencia, Castile and León (Crown of Castile)		Crown of Castile (1387– )
	Female order of the Hatchet	1149	Ramon Berenguer IV, Count of Barcelona	Tortosa, Catalonia (County of Barcelona)		County of Barcelona (1149– )
	Order of Santiago	1151	Ferdinand II of León and Pedro Suárez de Deza	Uclés, Castile-La Mancha (Kingdom of Castile) and León, Castile and León (Kingdom of León)	July 5, 1175 by Pope Alexander III, Pope Urban III, Pope Innocent III	Kingdom of León (1158– ), Kingdom of Castile (1158– )

Both Medieval naval and knights orders, fulfilling dual function, but mainly naval

Emblem	Name	Founded	Founder	Origin	Recognition	Protection
	Order of Saint Mary of Spain	1270	Alfonso X of Castile	Cartagena, Region of Murcia (Crown of Castile)		Crown of Castile (1177– )

== Current orders of chivalry ==
The Catholic Monarchs Queen Isabella I of Castile and King Ferdinand II of Aragon introduced a military honours system which was approved by the Pope Adrian VI in 1523. They awarded titles and hereditary honours to nobles and soldiers. Of those titles the following exist today:

- Order of Calatrava, St. Raymond of Fitero, first abbott of the cistercian monastery of Fitero (Navarre), 1158.
- Order of Santiago, King Ferdinand II of León, 1170.
- Order of Alcántara, St. Julian de Pereiro, 1176.
- Order of Montesa, King James II of Aragon and Pope John XXII, 1317.
- Orden de San Juan (Order of St. John)
- Order of the Holy Sepulchre

=== Dynastic order ===
- The Distinguished Order of the Golden Fleece, a chivalrous Order founded in 1430 by the Duke of Burgundy, Philip III of Burgundy. Charles I held the first chapter of the order in Spain in 1519 and it was consolidated as a Spanish dynastic order during the reign of Philip II.

== Military honours ==
- Royal and Military Order of Saint Ferdinand
- Cross of Military Merit
- Cross of Naval Merit
- Cross of Aeronautical Merit
- Military Medal
- Cruz de Guerra (War Cross)
- Medalla del Ejército (Army Medal)
- Medalla Naval (Navy Medal)
- Medalla Aérea (Air Force Medal)
- Royal and Military Order of Saint Hermenegild
- Long Military Service Cross
- Cruz Fidélitas (Fidelity Cross)
- Medalla de Campaña (Campaign Medal)
- Medal of the Century of Our Lady of the Pillar as Patron of the Spanish Civil Guard
- Medal of the V Centenary of Saint Barbara as Patron of the Artillery Weapon

=== Other Military Awards ===
- Distinguished Service Award (Spain) (Distinguished Service Award)
- Mención Honorífica (Mention in dispatches)

=== International Military Decorations ===
- The Common Security and Defence Policy Service Medal
- The United Nations Medal
- The NATO Medal
- NATO Serge Lazareff Prize

=== Obsolete ===
- Military Order of María Cristina (Royal and Military Order of Maria Christina) (1889–1931)
- Orden Naval de María Cristina (Royal and Military Naval Order of Maria Christina) (1891–1931)
- Medal of Suffering for the Motherland (Medal of Suffering for the Motherland) (1814–1989)
- Medal of the Maimed (Spain) (Medal of the Maimed) (1938–1989)
- Cord and Sash of the Victory 1936-1939 (Cord and Sash of the Victory 1936-1939) (1940–1989)
- Sahara Medal (Sahara Medal) (1977)

=== Obsolete International Military Decorations ===
- The Western European Union Mission Service Medal

== Civil decorations ==
=== Background ===
- The Royal and Distinguished Spanish Order of Charles III, Established by Charles III in 1771 to decorate those having benefited Spain and her Crown by their actions. It is the highest civil decoration that exists in Spain.
- The Royal Order of Isabella the Catholic, established by Fernand VII in 1815, to "reward unflinching loyalty to Spain and the merits of Spanish and foreign subjects in benefit of the Nation and especially those services relating to the prosperity of the American and other overseas territories". The decoration is currently the responsibility of the Ministry of Foreign Affairs.
- The Order of Civil Merit, established by Alfonso XIII in 1926 to "reward the civic virtues of civil servants as well as the extraordinary services to the Nation of Spanish and foreign subjects". It too is currently the responsibility of the Ministry of Foreign Affairs.

=== Politics and justice ===
- The Order of the Cross of Saint Raymond of Peñafort, established in 1944 to “reward relevant merits performed by those persons involved in the administration of Justice and for their contribution and study of all branches of Law and for the untarnished services to judicial activities under the responsibility of the Ministry of Justice". Relies on the Undersecretary of Justice, through the Division for the Processing of Pardon Rights and Other Rights, within this order there are various crosses and medals.
- The Order of Constitutional Merit, established by Felipe Gonzalez’s government in 1988 to “reward those persons who distinguish themselves by their services to the Constitution and of the values established therein”. It can be awarded both to persons or organizations (public or private).
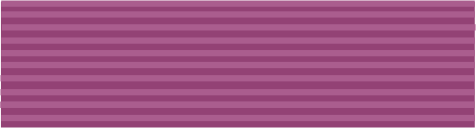
- The Order of Cisneros, founded in 1944 to reward political merit.
- The Royal Order of Civil Recognition to Victims of Terrorism, created in 1999, in order to honour those killed, wounded or kidnapped by terrorists. It consists of a Grand Cross, that can be awarded posthumously to the deceased and a Commendation, for those injured and kidnapped.
- The Gold Medals of the Cortes Generales
- The Medal of the Congress of Deputies, established in 2023 to honor former presidents of Congress and personalities related to the Cortes' Lower House.

=== Culture and society ===
- The Civil Order of Alfonso X, the Wise, founded in 1945 with the aim of to “reward relevant merits in the fields of education, science, culture, higher education and research”. In 1988, the Civil Order of Alfonso XII was merged into this one.
- The Order of Arts and Letters of Spain
- The Royal Order of Sports Merit
- The Gold Medal of Merit in the Fine Arts
- The Medal of Merit in Research and University Education
- The Medal of Philatelic Merit (Medal of Philatelic Merit)
- The Medal of Merit for Radio Operators (Medal of Merit for Radio Operators)

=== Social affairs ===
- The Civil Order of Social Solidarity, established in 1988 to replace the old Order of Beneficence with the aim of “recognizing persons or organizations, both Spanish and foreign having distinguished themselves in promoting or performing activities related to social welfare”.
- The Civil Order of Health, created in 1829 (as Cross of Epidemics) to honor those doctors that "have distinguished themselves in the fulfillment of their obligations, assisting afflicted humanity with particular care, without being daunted by the imminent danger to their lives". In 1910 was merged with the Order of Beneficence and reestablished in 1943 in its current form.
- The Order of Merit of the National Drug Plan, established in 1995, it comprises 3 levels: Gold medal, for those who “have distinguished themselves in the performance of their activities or for achievements of special significance or importance, or that entailed a risk to their life, both in prevention, assistance, reinsertion or in combating drug trafficking as well as its consequences or derived illicit earnings”; Silver medal, for those “having carried out or carrying out noteworthy activities with continued dedication and solidarity, in the above mentioned areas, taking into account their real results”; White cross, for those “having shown exemplary and significant dedication in the above mentioned reas”.
- The Civil Order of Environmental Merit, created in 2009 to reward persons and organizations for eminent services or out-standing actions, for nature conservation, natural heritage and biodiversity preservation, the fight against climate change, environmental quality, the defense and promotion of the marine water and continental resources sustainability and, in general, initiatives on environmental protection.
- The Medalla al Mérito Social Penitenciario (Medal of Social Penitentiary Merit), introduced in 1996, intended to reward those individuals or institutions that have contributed to the prison rehabilitation.
- The Medalla de Honor de la Emigración (Medal of Honour of Emigration)
- The Medalla y Placa a la Promoción de los Valores de Igualdad (Equality Values Promotion Medal and Plaque)
- The Medalla de la Seguridad Social (Medal of Social Security)
- The Distinciones de la Cruz Roja Española (Spanish Red Cross Decorations)
- The Medalla del Donante de Sangre (Blood Donor Medal)

=== Security ===
- The Order of Merit for Security
- The Order of Police Merit
- The Order of Merit of the Civil Guard
- The Medal of Merit for Civil Protection
- The Medalla al Mérito de la Seguridad Vial (Medal of Merit of Road Security)
- The Medalla al Mérito Penitenciario (Medal of Penitentiary Merit)
- The Police Service Decoration

=== Socioeconomics ===
- The Orden Civil del Mérito de Telecomunicaciones y de la Sociedad de la Información (Civil Order of Merit for Telecommunications and Information Society)
- The Orden Civil del Mérito Postal (Civil Order of Postal Merit)
- The Orden del Mérito Agrario, Pesquero y Alimentario (Order of Agricultural, Fishing and Alimentary Merit)
- The Medalla y Placa al Mérito Turístico (Touristic Merit Medal and Plaque)
- The Medalla y Placa al Mérito del Transporte Terrestre (Land Transport Merit Medal and Plaque)
- The Medalla y Placa al Mérito de la Marina Mercante (Merchant Marine Merit Medal and Plaque)
- The Medal of Merit in Labour
- The Medalla al Mérito en el Seguro (Insurance Merit Medal)
- The Medalla y Placa al Mérito en el Comercio (Commerce Merit Medal and Plaque)

=== Regions ===
- The Medalla de Andalucia (Medal of Andalusia)
- The Medalla de las Cortes de Aragón (Medal of Aragonese Corts)
- The Medalla de Asturias (Medal of Asturias)
- The Medalla de Oro de Canarias (Gold Medal of Canary Islands)
- The Medalla de Oro de las Islas Baleares (Gold Medal of Balearic Islands)
- The Medalla del Parlamento de Cantabria (Gold Medal of the Parliament of Cantabria)
- The Medalla de Extremadura (Medalla de Extremadura)
- The Medalla de Oro de Castilla-La Mancha (Gold Medal of Castile-La Mancha)
- The Medalla y Placa al Mérito Deportivo en Castilla-La Mancha (Sports Merit in Castile-La Mancha Medal and Plaque)
- The Medalla y Placa al Mérito Sanitario en Castilla-La Mancha (Health Merit in Castile-La Mancha Medal and Plaque)
- The Medalla al Mérito en la Iniciativa Social de Castilla-La Mancha (Social Initiatives of Castile-La Mancha Medal)
- The Medalla de Castilla y León (Castile and León Medal)
- The Medalla al Mérito Profesional de Castilla y León (Professional Merit Medal of Castile and León)
- The Medalla de las Cortes de Castilla y León (Corts of Castile and León Medal)
- The Medalla al Mérito Parliamentario (Parliamentary Merit Medal), Castile and León
- The Medalla d'Or de la Generalitat de Catalunya (Gold Medal of the Generalitat of Catalonia)
- The Premi Creu de Sant Jordi (Cross of St. George Award), Catalonia.
- The Medalla de Galicia (Medal of Galicia)
- The Medalla Castelao (Castelao Medal), Galicia
- The Medalla de La Rioja (Medal of La Rioja)
- The Orden del Dos de Mayo (Order of the Second of May), Merit Order of the Community of Madrid.
- The Medalla de la Comunidad de Madrid (Medal of the Community of Madrid)
- The Medalla de la Región de Murcia (Medal of the Region of Murcia)
- The Medalla de Oro de Navarra (Gold Medal of Navarre)
- The Cruz de Carlos III El Noble de Navarra (Charles III the Noble of Navarre Cross), Navarre
- The Cross of the Tree of Gernika medal, Basque Country
- The Lan Onari medal, Basque Country
- The Lagun Onari medal, Basque Country
- Distinciones de la Generalitat Valenciana (Valencian Community Distinctions)
- The Orden de Jaume I el Conqueridor (James I the Conqueror Order), Valencian Community

Autonomous cities

- The Medalla de la Autonomía de Ceuta (Medal of Autonony of Ceuta)
- The Medalla de la Ciudad de Melilla (City of Melilla Medal)

=== Others ===
- The Royal Order of Noble Ladies of Queen Maria Luisa
- The Medalla Plus Ultra (Plus Ultra Medal)
- The Medalla al Mérito en el Ahorro (Merit in Savings Medal), Spanish Confederation of Savings Banks Medal.

== Obsolete ==
- The Royal Order of Spain, Joseph Bonaparte (1809–1812)
- The Orden Civil de María Victoria (Civil Order of María Victoria), King Amadeo (1871–1873).
- The Civil Order of Alfonso XII, Alfonso XIII (1902–1931) Officially replaced by the Civil Order of Alfonso X, the Wise (1988)
- The Order of the Spanish Republic, Second Republic (1932–1939).
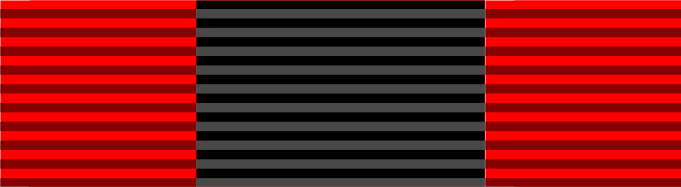
- The Imperial Order of the Yoke and Arrows, Francisco Franco (1937–1976).

== See also ==
- Spanish chivalry
- Order of Beneficence (Spain)
