= Medal of the V Centenary of Saint Barbara =

Military award

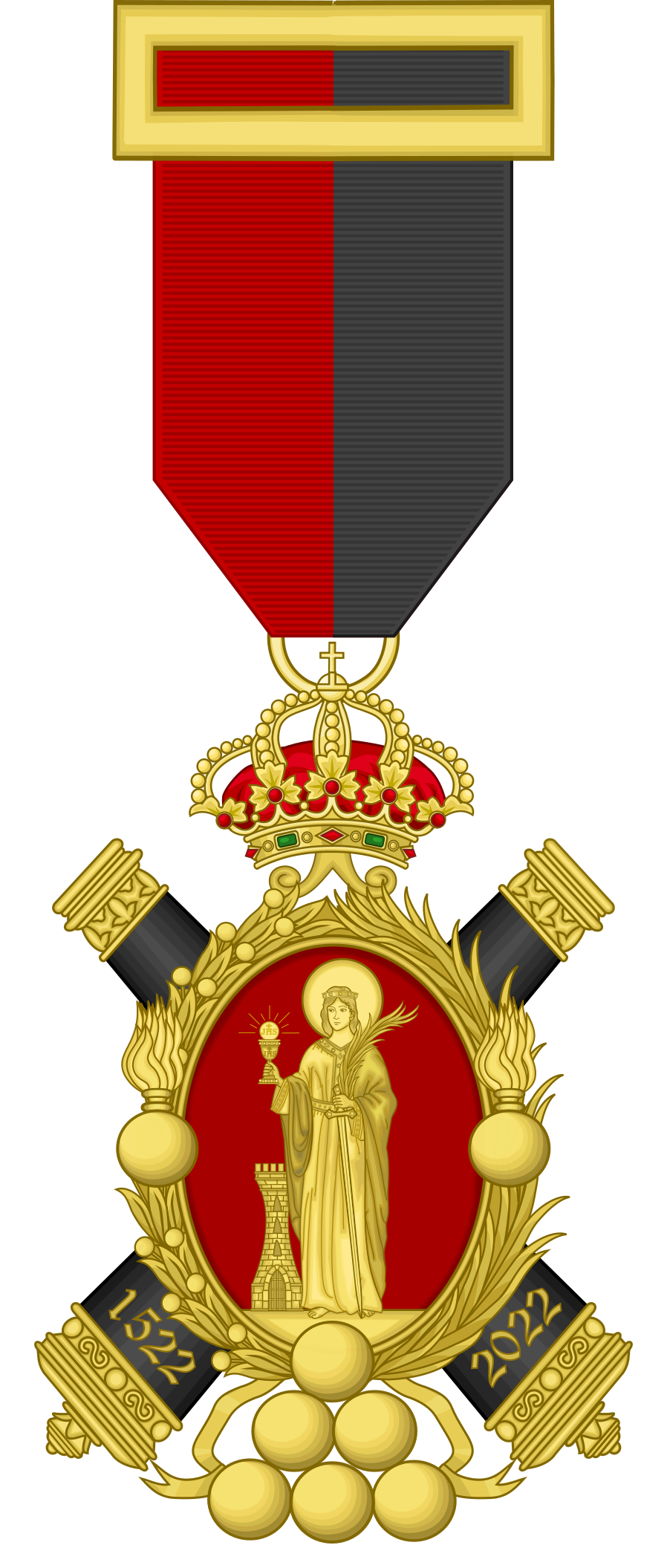
- Medal of the V Centenary of Saint Barbara
- Type: Military decoration
- Awarded for: Public recognition of the celebration of the Fifth Centenary of the Proclamation of Saint Barbara as Patron of the Artillery Weapon
- Presented by: Military Archbishop of Spain for the Artillery Weapon of the Spanish Armed Forces
- Eligibility: All Artillerymen in any administrative situation, as well as former replacement artillerymen and students of the Artillery Academy, and the Ladies of Santa Barbara. Personnel, associations or institutions considered especially deserving of this distinction after appraisal of merits by the Artillery Arm or by own initiative of concession of the Military Archbishop. Spanish Military Chaplains in any administrative situation.
- Status: Currently awarded
- Established: 4 December 2021

Precedence
- Next (higher): Campaign Medal
- Equivalent: Medal of the Century of Our Lady of the Pillar

The Commemorative Medal of the Fifth Centenary of the Proclamation of Saint Bárbara as Patron of the Artillery Weapon, commonly called the Medal of the V Centenary of Saint Barbara, is an official Spanish decoration created on December 4, 2021 to commemorate the five hundred years of patronage of Santa Barbara to the components of the Artillery Weapon of the Spanish Armed Forces. Created by the Military Archbishopric of Spain by virtue of the Agreements between the Spanish State and the Holy See of 1979, decreed by D. Carlos Jesús Montes Herreros, Military Ordinary of Spain, after the death of the Military Archbishop of Spain Juan del Río Martín in January of that same year, and the consecration of the newly appointed Military Archbishop-elect Juan Antonio Aznárez Cobo is still pending.

On November 25, 2021, Pope Francis convened the Jubilee Year of Saint Barbara as patron saint of the Artillery Weapon, a determining circumstance for the creation of this medal as a more enduring sign of this tribute to the Patron Saint of artillerymen, who also belongs to the group of the fourteen Holy Helpers of the Church.

== Requirements and allowance ==
They can be recognized with this medal, by virtue of article 2 of the Creation Decree:

a) In their own right: all Artillerymen in any administrative situation, as well as former replacement artillerymen and students of the Artillery Academy, and the Ladies of Santa Bárbara.

b) The personnel, associations or institutions considered especially deserving of this distinction after assessment of the merits by the Artillery Arm or by own initiative of concession of the Military Archbishop.

c) Spanish Military Chaplains in any administrative situation"

The award of the Medal may be imposed by the chaplains on the occasion of an act related to the Artillery Weapon or its Patron. The granting instances, who have the right to provide concessions, must submit their requests to the Military Artillery Arm or Archbishopric, depending on the applicant, being granted in everything by the Military Archbishop or Military Ordinary, in the absence of the former. The period for awarding the medal began on December 4, 2021 and will end on December 4, 2022, except for an extension decreed by the Military Archbishop.

== Concession ==
- The instances to request concessions must be sent to the Artillery Arm or Military Archbishopric, depending on the applicant.
- The Archbishop or Military Ordinary, in the absence of the former, will award the medal if the information provided by the interested party in the application allows it if he/she has the merits to receive the decoration and is on the list of authorized candidates.
- Once granted, the concession credential will be sent to the interested party.
- The military chaplains will try to impose the medal for an act related to the Artillery Weapon, in particular, on the occasion of the Patron Saint Barbara.
- Currently the concession period is open until December 4, 2022.

== Description ==
As established in Annex I of the Creation Decree, the decoration hangs from a longitudinally divided red and black ribbon, representative colors of the artillerymen.

- On the obverse: Oval gold medal with its center circumscribed by a split crown of fruity laurel and palm, joined at the end by a ribbon and accompanied by two brand new hand bombs on the sides and a stack of bullets arranged 1 -2-3 at its tip. Accolades in a cross, two black cannons decorated on the curb and from the scotch to the rattle, gold, carrying, above the escoda, the one in bar, the number "1522" and the one in band, the number " 2022". The whole set stamped with a royal crown of the same and lined with red enamel. It is attached to the medal by means of two converging scrolls at the base of the crown. The center is made of red enamel with the figure of Santa Bárbara crowned, holding a chalice with the right hand and protruding from it, the Holy Form and with the left hand, the palm of martyrdom and a sword. To the right of the Saint and at her feet, on a terrace, is a closed tower with three wooden windows. All in gold.
- On the reverse: The same as on the obverse, but entirely in gold, without the brand new bombs or the figures on the barrels. The crown is made of palms and fruity laurel. The center of the reverse is in black enamel with the emblem of the Military Archbishopric of Spain in gold on the abyss and on the border the legend "SANTA BÁRBARA, 500 YEARS WITH ITS ARTILLERS" of the same.

== See also ==
- Orders, decorations, and medals of Spain
- Medal of the Century of Our Lady of the Pillar
- Spanish Armed Forces
- Spanish Army
- Arzobispado Castrense de España
- Cruz Fidélitas
- Saint Barbara
