= Boletín Oficial del Estado =

Official gazette of the Kingdom of Spain

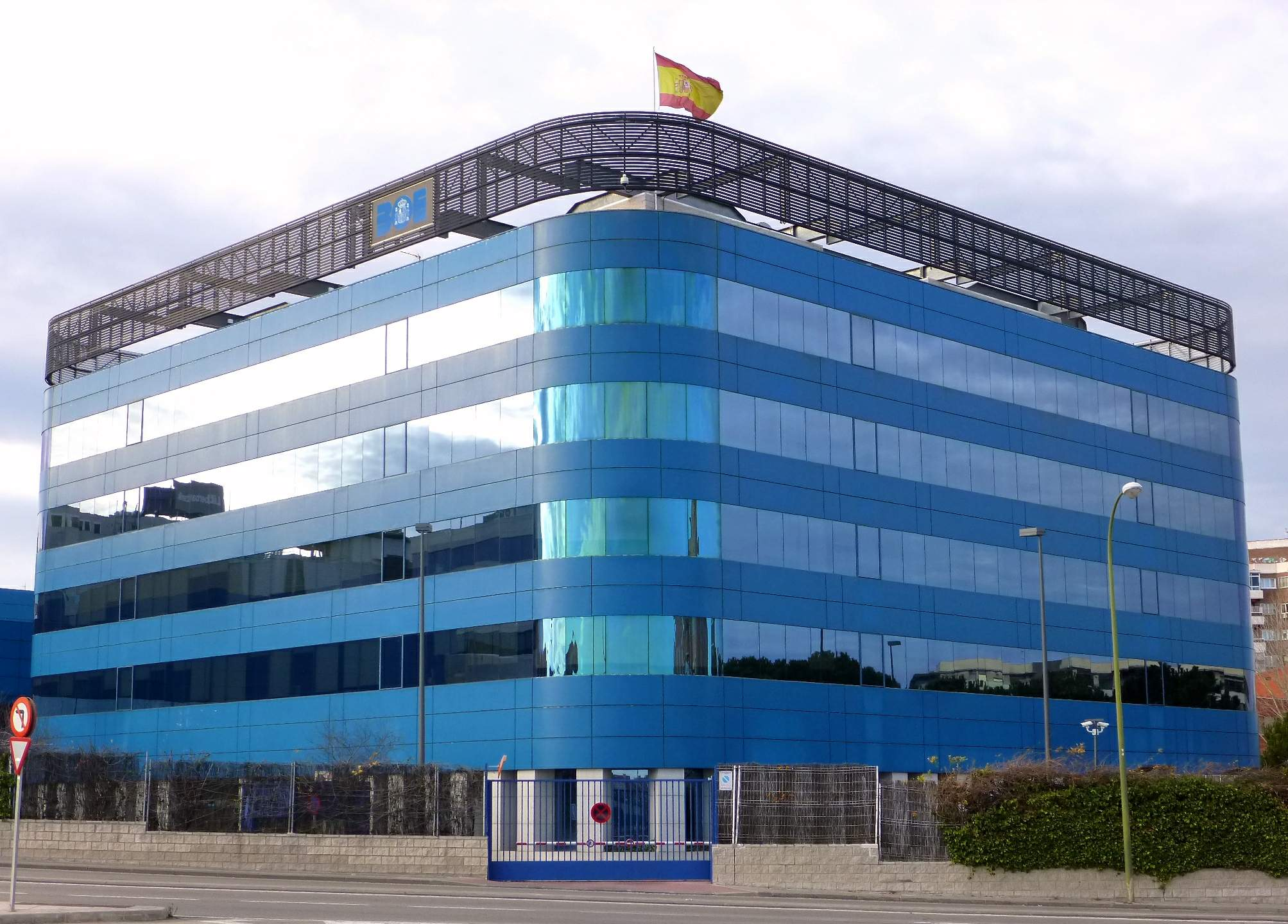
- Headquarters in Madrid
- Editor: State Agency for the Official State Gazette
- Categories: Government gazette
- Frequency: Daily
- First issue: 1661; 365 years ago
- Country: Spain
- Based in: Madrid
- Language: Spanish
- Website: boe.es

The Boletín Oficial del Estado (BOE; "Official State Gazette" or "Official Bulletin of the State", from 1661 to 1936 known as the Gaceta de Madrid, "Madrid Gazette") is the official gazette of Spain and may be published on any day of the week. The content of the BOE is authorized and published by Royal Assent and with approval from the Office of the Prime Minister.

The BOE publishes decrees by the Cortes Generales, Spain's Parliament (comprising the Senate and the Congress of Deputies) as well as those orders enacted by the Spanish Autonomous Communities. The Spanish Constitution of 1978 provides in Article 9.3 that "The Constitution guarantees ... the publication of laws." This includes the official publishing of all Spanish judicial, royal and national governmental decrees, as well as any orders by the Council of Ministers.

According to Royal Decree 181/2008 of 8 February, the BOE is the official journal of the Kingdom of Spain, providing the State Government the means to publish mandatory laws, regulations and other acts approved by the parliaments. It therefore contains a comprehensive list of all Laws passed in parliament, the provisions adopted by the Government of Spain and the general provisions of the Autonomous Communities.

Following Law 11/2007 of 22 June, concerning the electronic access of citizens to Public Services, and Royal Decree 181/2008 of 8 February, concerning the official gazette, the publication ceased in its traditional print format on 31 December 2008 and switched to an online mode of dissemination.

== Structure ==
Since 2009, the gazette is now primarily published electronically. Each individual notice is now published as its own electronic document, pagination begins and ends every year with each notice following a continuous page numbering system.

Notices are currently structured in the following way:

Section I
General provisions

- The organic laws, laws, royal legislative decrees and royal decree-laws.
- International treaties and conventions.
- The laws of the legislative assemblies of the autonomous communities.
- Regulations and other general provisions.
- The normative regulations emanating from the governing councils of the Autonomous Communities.

Section II
Authorities and personnel

Composed of two subsections:

- Appointments, situations and incidents.
- Competitions and contests.

Section III
Other provisions

Composed of the provisions that must be published with no general character or apply to other sections: grants and subsidies, service letters, collective agreements of general scope, curricula, etc.

Section IV
Administration of Justice

- Edicts, notices, requisitions and announcements of the Courts.

Section V
Ads

Grouped as follows:

- Ads bidding and awards.
- Other official announcements.
- Bulleting.

There is also an independent supplement in which statements, statements and orders of the Constitutional Court are published.

== See also ==
- Boletín Oficial del Estado (Spanish Wikipedia)
- Spanish government orders and decorations
- Grandees of Spain
