= Long Military Service Cross (Spain) =

- Long Service Cross in Gold
- Type: Medal
- Awarded for: Long service and good conduct
- Presented by: Spain
- Eligibility: Military personnel and members of the Civil Guard
- Status: Currently Awarded
- Established: 26 December 1958; 67 years ago

Precedence
- Next (higher): Royal and Military Order of Saint Hermenegild
- Equivalent: Police Service Decoration
- Next (lower): Cruz Fidélitas

The Long Military Service Cross (Spanish: Cruz a la Constancia en el Servicio) is a military decoration of the Spanish Armed Forces and Civil Guard whose purpose is to reward long and meritorious service below the level required for induction into the Royal and Military Order of Saint Hermenegild.

The decoration was established by the Spanish government on December 26, 1958, and its current regulation was approved by King Juan Carlos I in Royal Decree 682/2002. Regulations for the award were later modified in 2011, by Royal Decree 1385/2011.

== Eligibility ==
The Long Military Service Cross may be awarded to all members of the Spanish Armed Forces, as well as to members of the Civil Guard at or below the rank of Corporal (OR-3). It can be presented in three grades, depending on time of service:

- Gold for 30 years of meritorious service
- Silver for 25 years of meritorious service
- Bronze for 15 years of meritorious service

Medals and Ribbon Bars
Gold Cross	Silver Cross	Bronze Cross

In addition to time in service, an individual must not have a criminal offense on their personal record, nor have been given any significant disciplinary action, in order to be eligible to receive the medal. Demotion, and loss of rank, are automatic disqualifiers for receipt of the award.

== Design ==
The ribbon of the medal is yellow, with a central stripe and thin border of magenta. The medal is a white cross pattée, bordered in either bronze, silver, or gold, and suspended from a crown. At the center of the cross is a deep-blue enameled medallion, circumscribed by a white-enameled border which reads PREMIO A LA CONSTANCIA EN EL SERVICIO (English: Award for Constant Service). At the center of the medallion is a red Cross of Saint James, in the style of the Order of Santiago.

== See also ==
- Orders, decorations, and medals of Spain
- Spanish Armed Forces
