= Spanish chivalry =

Knights in Medieval Spain

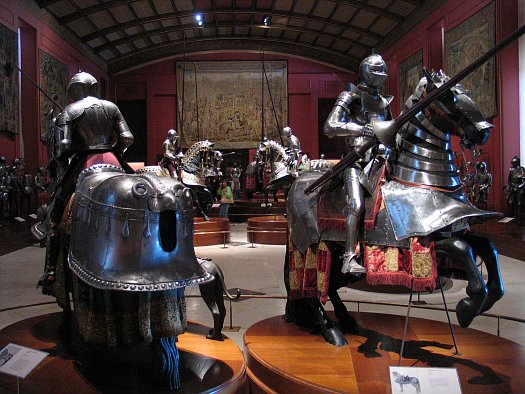
Royal Armoury of Madrid, Spain

During the Middle Ages, Europe was the stage of a large number of wars, some of them shortlived, others iterative or long. European warfare during the Middle Ages was marked by a transformation in the character of warfare from antiquity, changing military tactics, and in particular of the role of cavalry and artillery. In addition to military, tactical and technological innovations during this period, chivalric military and religious ideals arose, giving motivation for engagement in the ceaseless warfare. In the Iberian Peninsula (particularly in Spain or future Spanish territories), chivalric ideals and institutions would be adopted and exercised with more fervour than anywhere else.

== Early Spanish chivalry ==
Chivalry, or chivalric codes of manners and proper military engagement, is believed to have arrived in the Iberian Peninsula during the 10th century, in the context of the Reconquista. This was when Frankish knights, who were willing to fight the Muslim invaders of Iberia prior to the Crusades, appeared to protect pilgrims flocking to what was believed to be the tomb of the apostle James in Galicia. St. James himself was known and celebrated in Christianity as ‘the slayer of the Moors’, and the discovery of his body by Christians has been considered an igniting factor of the Reconquista. The Reconquista had begun under Alfonso II (791–842) and would last nearly 700 years as Christians attempted to drive Muslims out of the Iberian Peninsula. However, the in-statement of chivalric knightly orders and the chivalric ideals and codes of conduct weren’t present on the Iberian Peninsula until almost the second century of the Reconquista. In the context of the Reconquista, and the close proximity of Christian and Muslim populations, the atmosphere for the development of Knightly Orders was ripe, and in the subsequent centuries, chivalry flourished in Spain to a greater extent than in other Christian states.

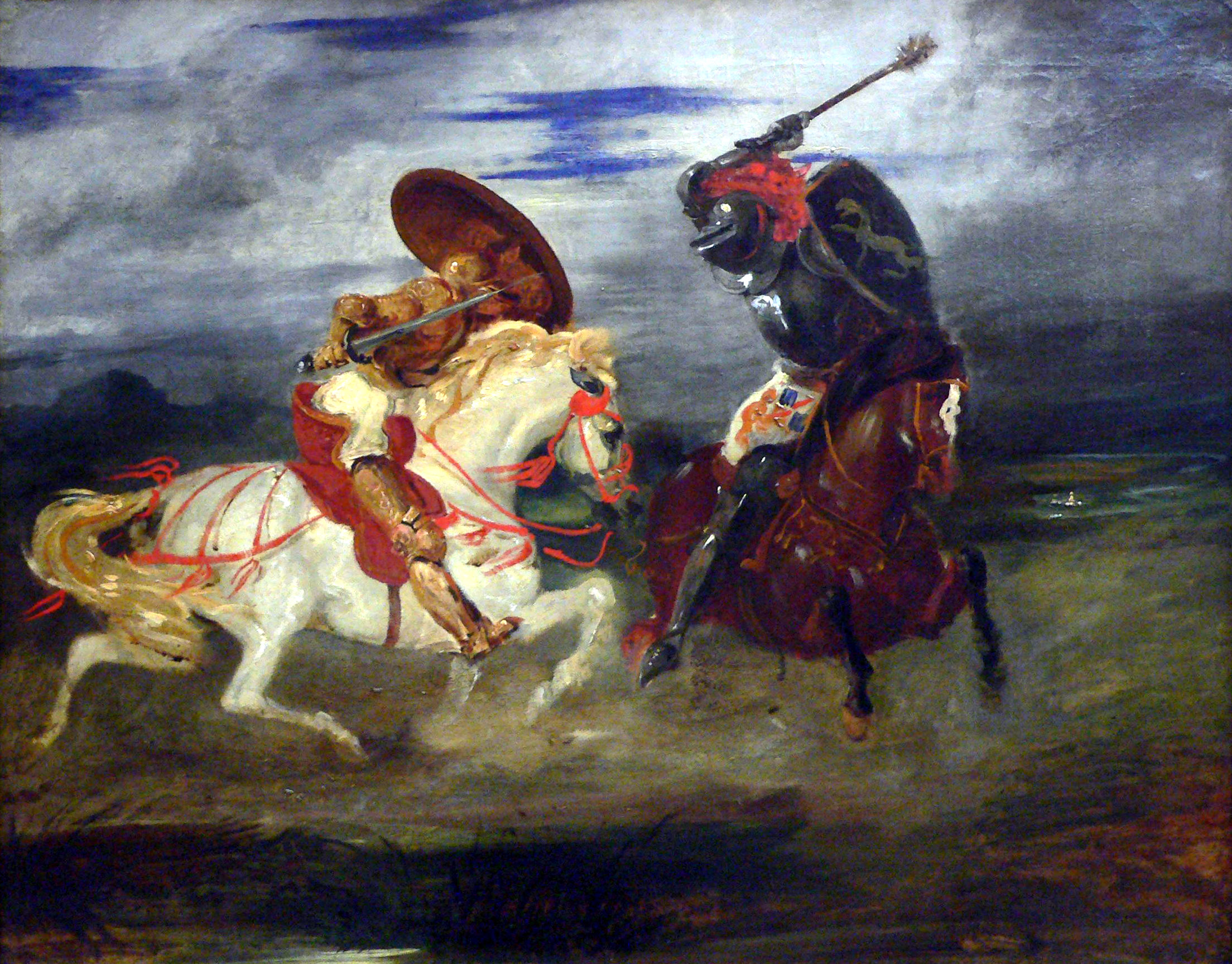
Combat des chevaliers dans la campagne (1824) by Eugène Delacroix, now in the Louvre

Chivalry in medieval Spain cannot be understood outside of the context of the military orders of knighthood. Historians are conflicted as to whether Spanish knights were directed more by royalty (such as the king of Castile or the king of Aragon), or by the Papacy. But there seems to be a consensus that the knights had obligations to both and an overarching allegiance to the Church, as both were in direct contact with knights (and often royalty were themselves, knights and crusaders). Some scholars have suggested that the later Spanish military Orders, like that at the fortress of Calatrava, pledged their loyalty primarily to their Kingdom, in this case Castile, but orders like the Templars or Hospitallers were more independent and not necessarily loyal to any kingdom consistently.

== The uniqueness of Spanish chivalry ==
The Iberian Peninsula had multiple factors contributing to the strong chivalric ethos exemplified by Spanish knights. One determinate factor to the strong adoption of chivalric orders in Spain is the Reconquista, in which Christian kingdoms attempted to expel Muslims from the peninsula. The greatest foes of the Spanish knights were Muslims, who were not an imagined enemy but one deeply entrenched in reality and not as distant as the infidel, or enemy, was for the knights of France or Germany. In other Christian kingdoms, the fighting was initially waged between Christians of different kingdoms, and as such was more debated and contested within Christian circles. However, in Spain, the Christian knights and kingdoms were engaged with what was almost acknowledged as a foe to Christianity, and this common enemy had some role in uniting Christian kingdoms in the cause of the Crusades and Reconquista. In the 12th and 13th century, most of the prominent Spanish knightly orders were formed. The early formation of the orders was dangerous and unstable. In Calatrava, in the mid-12th century, Castilian knights established a fortress, which would later be abandoned due to the threat of a Muslim attack. Within fifty years, a fort of the Order of Calatrava was rebuilt and became a fortified monastic community.

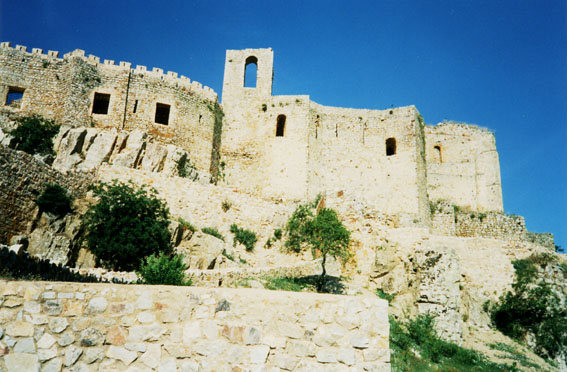
Castillo de Calatrava la Nueva

The prominence of knightly orders in the political and military realms of the Christian kingdoms of the peninsula fluctuated with the crusader zeal of the kingdoms’ rulers; however, their power was not exclusively tied to the Crusader Kings. For instance, Ferdinand III of Castile’s reign facilitated the rise of more Spanish orders because of the desire in the kingdom, led by the king, to crusade against the Moors.

After the death of Ferdinand III, Castile was relatively peaceful and the morale of the orders was undermined. In this period of peace between the orders and the Muslims, mercenaries were hired to replace and assist knights in their fighting, Masters of the Orders were no longer religiously appointed, and civil war was waged between Christian knights with conflicting loyalties.

By this time chivalry was influenced by the fictional prowesses of chivalry romances. Knight Suero de Quiñones and his friends, in summer 1434, maintained a pas d'armes (Passo Honroso) jousting as an homage to his future wife in 166 combats against pilgrim knights that attempted to cross a bridge on Saint James's Way.

The decline of knightly orders in Spain is debatable. Some historians have attributed the fall of chivalry and knightly orders to Miguel de Cervantes, because he “smiled Spain’s chivalry away” with his satirical novel Don Quixote (published in two parts, 1605 and 1615). Others have suggested that chivalry's decline was due to the expulsion of the Muslims in 1492, or the centralization of political power under the reign of Ferdinand and Isabella. Once the Moors were expelled, the four orders were perceived as powerful subjects and it became a priority for the Crown to gain control over them – particularly at a time when the Crown was struggling to establish its central authority. If one subscribes to this latter view (the earlier fall of chivalry and knightly orders at the end of the 15th century), then clearly Cervantes did not so much contribute to that event, as to document (at the beginning of the 17th century) its prior occurrence, a point that is central to Don Quixote, that this decline had already occurred at the time of Quixote's adventures.

The Spanish kings had frequently obtained the election of close connections of their families as Masters of the Orders and at Calatrava in 1489, Santiago in 1494, and Alcántara in 1495, the administration of the three Magisteries were ultimately granted to King Ferdinand of Aragón, as Sovereign of Aragón and King-Consort of Castille. Finally, by the Bull Dum intra of Pope Adrian VI dated 4 May 1523, the perpetual administration' of the three orders was transferred to "Charles I (the Holy Roman Emperor Charles V), King of Spain, and his heirs and successors…”

== Later incarnations of Spanish chivalry ==
After the Reconquista and the loss of their prominence, Spanish orders would find a new role as an elite corps of the nobility, maintaining their castles and estates as commanderies to provide incomes for those who had distinguished themselves in the service of the monarch. The succeeding centuries saw the rise of the Spanish Empire, and the chivalric ideals of the knights transcended and reappeared in the guise of the conquistadors in the New World. “The rewards for the conquistador were similar to those of his medieval predecessor, the reconquistador: land to conquer, people to convert to Christianity, and glory or fame. The one major difference was that the conquistadors and reconquistadores were real people who also sought wealth whereas the knight-errant of the romances was a fictional creature indifferent to material gain. Bernal Díaz de Castillo, a soldier who took part in the conquest of Mexico, put the conquistador’s objective succinctly: 'we came here to serve God and the king and also to get rich'”.

== Spanish chivalric literature ==
=== El Cid ===
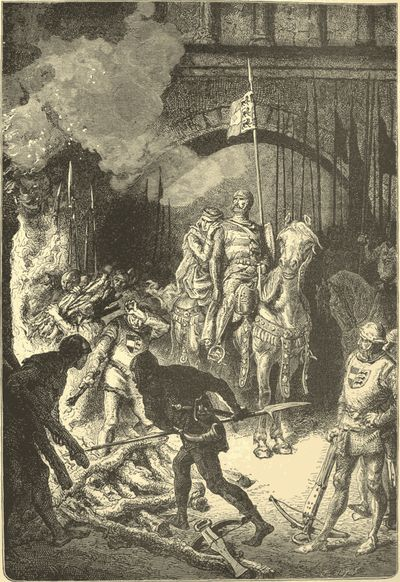
Engraving by Alphonse-Marie-Adolphe de Neuville of the Cid ordering the execution of the instigator of the revolt and almoravid after his conquest of the city in 1094.

El Cantar de Myo Çid ( El Poema de Myo Çid or Mio Cid, known as The Song of my Lord, known in English as The Lay of the Cid and The Poem of the Cid) is the oldest preserved Spanish epic poem. Based on a true story, it tells of the Spanish hero El Cid, and takes place during the Reconquista. “The protagonist of the poem is the historical Rodrigo Díaz de Vivar (1045–1099), also known as Cid (a dialectal form of the Arabic word sayyid, 'lord' or 'master') and Campeador ('Battler' or 'Victor'). The poem begins with the departure of Rodrigo from his home in Vivar, the first of two exiles of Rodrigo decreed by Alfonso VI, king of Castile and Leon (1065–1109). In the poem, this first exile (1081) and the second (1089) are conflated and lead to the Cid's military campaigns in the Spanish Levant, culminating in the Cid's conquest of the Moorish kingdom of Valencia (1094). Here, Rodrigo will remain with his wife and children as an independent prince until the end of his life.”

=== Amadís de Gaula ===
The original author is anonymous, perhaps from Portugal. It was first printed in 1508 by Garci Rodríguez de Montalvo. It is a chivalric romance linked to the Matter of Britain. The main character fights across several European realms, gets mad in courtly love for his lady and is persecuted by a wizard. The book had several sequels and translations into European languages.

=== Don Quixote ===
Don Quixote, his horse Rocinante and his squire Sancho Panza after an unsuccessful attack on a windmill. By Gustave Doré

Don Quixote is a novel written by Spanish author Miguel de Cervantes. Published in two volumes in 1605 and 1615, Don Quixote is the most influential work of literature from the Spanish Golden Age in the Spanish literary canon.

“A Spanish knight, about fifty years of age, who lived in great poverty in a village of La Mancha, gave himself up so entirely to reading the romances of chivalry, of which he had a large collection, that in the end they turned his brain, and nothing would satisfy him but that he must ride abroad on his old horse, armed with spear and helmet, a knight-errant, to encounter all adventures, and to redress the innumerable wrongs of the world. He induced a neighbour of his, a poor and ignorant peasant called Sancho Panza, mounted on a very good ass, to accompany him as squire. The knight saw the world only in the mirror of his beloved romances; he mistook inns for enchanted castles, windmills for giants, and country wenches for exiled princesses. His high spirit and his courage never failed him, but his illusions led him into endless trouble. In the name of justice and chivalry he intruded himself on all whom he met, and assaulted all whom he took to be making an oppressive or discourteous use of power. He and his poor squire were beaten, trounced, cheated, and ridiculed on all hands, until in the end, by the kindliness of his old friends in the village, and with the help of some new friends who had been touched by the amiable and generous character of his illusions, the knight was cured of his whimsies and was led back to his home in the village, there to die.”

== Prominent knightly orders of Spain ==
Order of Calatrava – was the first military order founded in Castile, but the second to receive papal approval. The papal bull confirming the Order of Calatrava as a Militia was given by Pope Alexander III on 26 September 1164.

Order of Santiago – (or the Order of Saint James of Compostela) was founded in the 12th century, and owes its name to the national patron of Spain, Santiago (St. James the Greater), under whose banner the Christians of Galicia and Asturias began in the 9th century to combat and drive out the Muslims.

Order of Alcántara – also called the Knights of St. Julian, was originally a military order of León, founded in 1166 and confirmed by Pope Alexander III in 1177.

Order of Montesa – was dedicated to Our Lady, and based at Montesa, Valencia. Pope John XXII approved it on 10 June 1317, and gave it the Cistercian rule.

== See also ==
- Spanish military orders
- Spanish Empire
- History of Spain
- Military history of Spain
- Reconquista
- Crusades
- Religious war
- Chivalry
- Marca Hispanica

== Bibliography ==
- Richard W. Barber (2005). The reign of chivalry. Boydell Press. ISBN 978-1-84383-182-2.
- Philippe Contamine (8 May 1986). War in the Middle Ages. Wiley-Blackwell. ISBN 978-0-631-14469-4.
- Prestage, Edgar, Chivalry. Stephan Austin & Sons Ltd. 1928
