= Order of Beneficence (Spain) =

Spanish Civil Decoration

Order of Beneficience
- Insignia of the Order
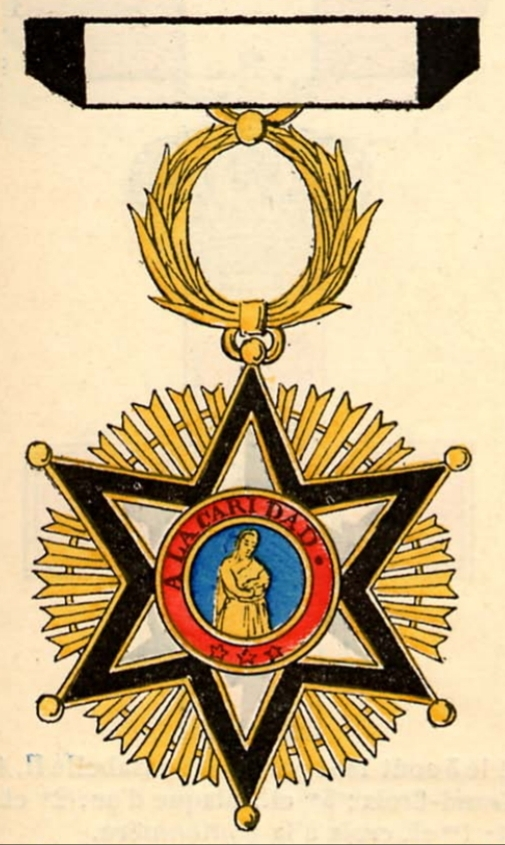
- "To Charity"
- Type: Order of Chivalry
- Description: To reward actions or services considered extraordinary performed in the course of public calamities.
- Date: May 17, 1856
- Country: Spain
- Status: Obsolete
- Order ribbon

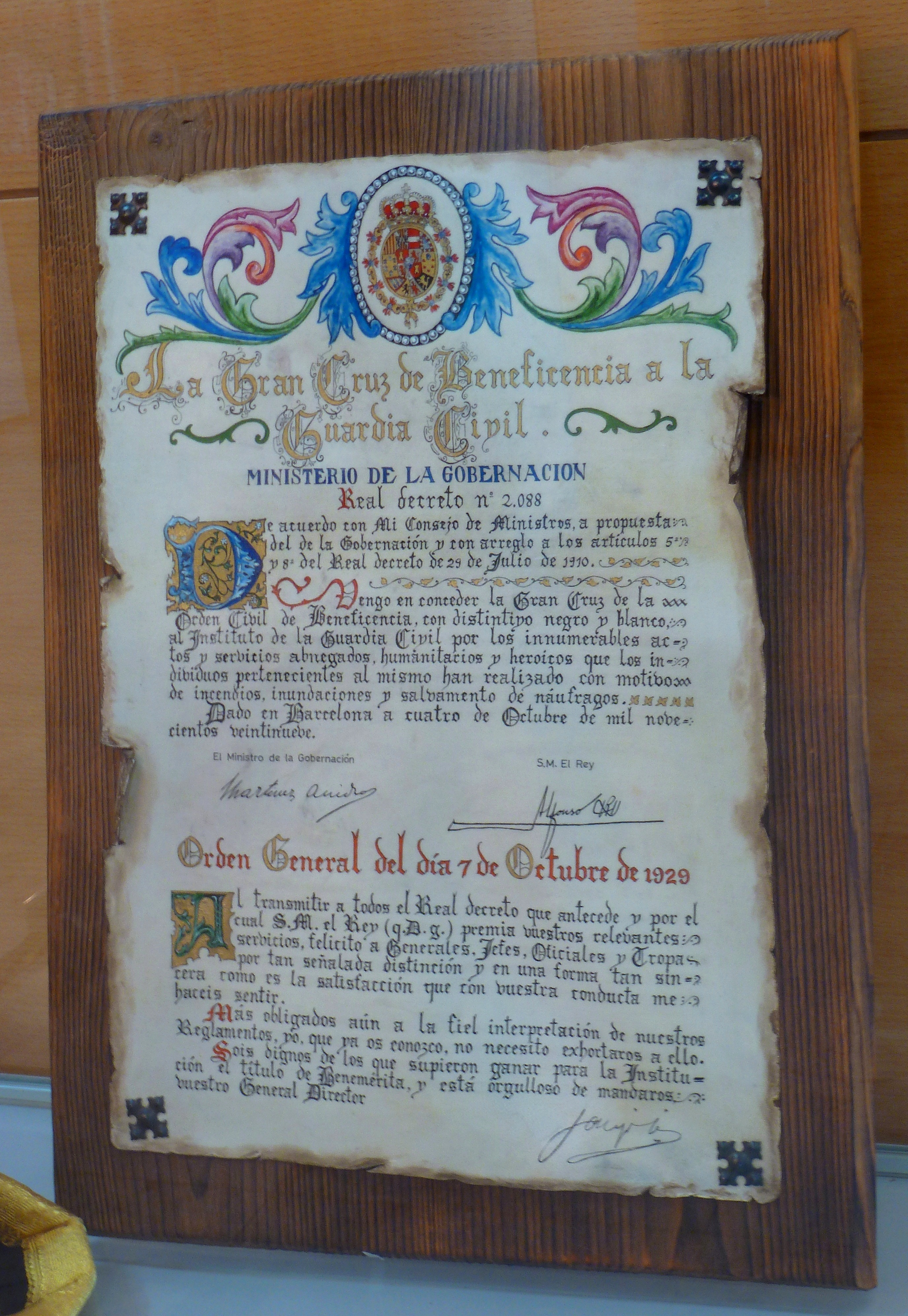
Diploma of the awarding of the Grand Cross of the Civil Order of Charity to the Civil Guard on October 4, 1929.

Coat of Arms of the City of Santa Cruz de Tenerife with the First Class Cross of the Civil Order of Beneficence, granted in 1893.

The Civil Order of Beneficence was a Spanish civil distinction whose purpose was to reward actions or services considered extraordinary, carried out in the course of public calamities. It was created on May 17, 1856, during the reign of Isabella II. It was replaced by the Civil Order of Social Solidarity on April 17, 1989.

== History ==
The Cross of Epidemics was established by royal order of August 15, 1838, and the Civil Order of Beneficence was created by royal decree of May 17, 1856. Both honorary distinctions were merged by royal decree of the Ministry of the Interior on July 29, 1910, remaining under the name of the Civil Order of Beneficence. Its purpose was to reward relevant services and merits of a sanitary nature, or those rendered due to assistance in sanitary struggles or epidemics.

In 1943 the Cross of Epidemics was reestablished with the name of Civil Order of Health, separating it from the Civil Order of Beneficence.

The Civil Order of Health has replaced these decorations since 1983.

Individuals or groups, national or foreign, may be members of the Civil Order of Health. Its concession is personal and non-transferable and, in the case of Corporations, Associations, Entities, Companies or collectives, it will expire after twelve years.

The concession confers the right to be and to be denominated member of the Civil Order of Health, to receive the treatment and official considerations due to its category, to exhibit the corresponding decorations, to be recognized in all class of activities and Sanitary Institutions and to make it be stated in the writings and documents of the interested party. In no case the reference to the Civil Order of Health will be able to be used, for the offer, promotion or publicity of products, activities or services, without damage of the possible reference in the books, documents or antecedents of the interested one.

In the first stage, the Civil Order of Charity had three classes or categories. The first of these, the First Class Cross, had a badge as insignia, the corresponding to the second, the Second Class Cross, was worn around the neck with a ribbon as a tie, and the category of the third, the Third Class Cross, on the chest, also with a ribbon, as a medal. In 1910 this order underwent a reform, the category of the Grand Cross with Badge as insignia was created, the design of the different insignia was modified and different badges were introduced in all the classes:

- Black and White Distinctive: recognizes actions involving personal risk. It carries the treatment of Illustrious, Illustrious Sir, Illustrious Madam (in Spanish: Ilustrísimo or Ilustrísima or Ilustrísimo Señor or Ilustrísima Señora).
- Purple and White Distinctive: Rewards acts or services related to public health. It carries the treatment of Sir or Madam (in Spanish: Señoría or Señor or Señora).
- White Distinctive: Rewards services considered extraordinary.

The Grand Cross with Badge carries with it the treatment of Excellency, Most Excellent, Most Excellent, Most Excellent Sir or Madam (in Spanish: Excelencia, Excelentísimo or Excelentísima or Excelentísimo Señor or Excelentísima Señora) the First Class Cross carries with it the treatment of Illustrious, Most Illustrious, Most Illustrious Sir or Madam (in Spanish: Ilustrísimo or Ilustrísima or Ilustrísimo Señor or Ilustrísima Señora) and the Second Class Cross carries with it the treatment of Sir or Madam (in Spanish: Señoría or Señor or Señora).

The Civil Order of Charity was abolished in 1931 and restored in 1940 during Franco's regime. It disappeared definitively on April 17, 1989, being replaced by the newly created Civil Order of Social Solidarity.

The Coat of Arms used by the city of Santa Cruz de Tenerife includes the First Class Cross of the Civil Order of Beneficence that was granted to the town of Santa Cruz de Tenerife in 1893 by the Queen Regent Maria Christina of Austria for its behavior during a cholera epidemic.

By virtue of royal decree number 2088 of October 4, 1929, the Grand Cross with Black and White Distinctive of the Civil Order of Beneficence was granted to the Civil Guard and the Carabineros for their work in aiding victims of fires, floods and floods. This fact explains the use of the adjective benemérita as a nickname to refer to this security corps.

== Revocation of distinctions ==
The recipient of any of the categories who has been sentenced for the commission of an intentional crime or has publicly and notoriously committed acts contrary to the reasons for the award of the distinction may, by virtue of proceedings initiated ex officio or by reasoned complaint, and with the intervention of the Prosecutor of the Royal Order, be deprived of the title corresponding to the distinction granted, a decision that corresponds to the person who granted it.

== See also ==
- Orders, decorations, and medals of Spain
- Beneficence
