= Royal Bend of Castile =

Heraldic element

The Royal Bend of Castile of the kingdom of Castile.

The Royal Bend of Castile (Banda Real de Castilla) was the heraldic flag of the monarchs of the Crown of Castile, a personal banner of military use, indicating the presence of the monarch. This emblem was created in 1332 by Alfonso XI of Castile, although its origin probably would go back to one of the primitive symbols of the Counts of Castile, which had consisted of a gold bend on red. The dragantes appeared on the handpiece or baton when Scipio brought the Roman legions to Hispania.

Alfonso XI founded the Order of the Royal Band of Castile to reward the best services to the sovereign.

The Bend of Castile was used by all the monarchs of Castile until Charles V, Holy Roman Emperor, succeeded as king of Spain in 1516. From the reign of Henry IV of Castile (1454–1474) it consisted of a reddish flag, probably purple scarlet, with a golden bend of throaty dragantes heads of the same color.

The dragantes are the heraldic representation of dragons.

Prior to the reign of Henry IV, the colors varied; existing examples from the reign of Peter of Castile (1350–1369) have a black bend with white dragantes.

During the reign of Henry I (1214–1217) the device was described as Gules, a bend or engouled of dragantes (dragon or wolf's heads). Before, the bend and the dragon's heads were different colours.

The Castilian Bend originated from the arms of the old Counts of Castile: Gules a bend Or, later Gules, a three-towered castle Or.

- The Catholic Monarchs used the Castilian Bend between a yoke with ribbons Or (on obverse side) and a sheaf of arrows with ribbons Or (on reverse side) and their motto: Tanto Monta, Monta Tanto ("cutting as untying") an explanation of the equality of the monarchs.
- Charles I used the Bend between the Pillars of Hercules, external ornaments of the King-Emperor's heraldry.

== Later use of the Royal Bend of Castile ==
- Francisco Franco, General and Head of State of Spain, used from 1940 to 1975 the Castilian Bend (like the version of Charles I) as Head of State’s Standard and Guidon: The Bend between the Pillars of Hercules, crowned with an imperial crown and open (old) royal crown. The Bend between the Pillars of Hercules also were depicting in the personal coat of arms used by Franco as Head of Spanish State.

The Royal Band of Castile, variant used by the Catholic Monarchs (obverse)	The Royal Band of Castile, variant used by the Catholic Monarchs (reverse)	The Royal Band of Castile, variant used by Charles V, Holy Roman Emperor	Standard of Francisco Franco as Head of Spanish State	Guidon of Francisco Franco as Head of Spanish State

== See also ==
- Heraldry of Castile
- Knights of the Band
- Female order of the Band
