= Female order of the Band =

Female Order of the Band
- Emblem of the Female order of the Band.

Awarded by John I of Castile
- Type: Chivalric order in one class
- Established: 1387
- Status: Disestablished
- Grades: Dame

The Female order of the Band is a female honorific order founded in 1387, bestowed upon the women of Palencia, in Castile and León (Crown of Castile, current Spain). It was founded by John I of Castile in 1387 in order to honor the memory of the knight women who helped the defense of Palencia in the siege by English troops; their courage contributed greatly to the defenders success in inflicting significant loss on the besiegers. He gave the Palencian noble knight women the privilege of carrying the golden bend "such as bringing the knights of the Order of the Band" created by Alfonso XI in 1332.

== See also ==
- Order of the Band
- Spanish military orders
