= Order of the Hatchet =

Defunct Spanish female honorific order

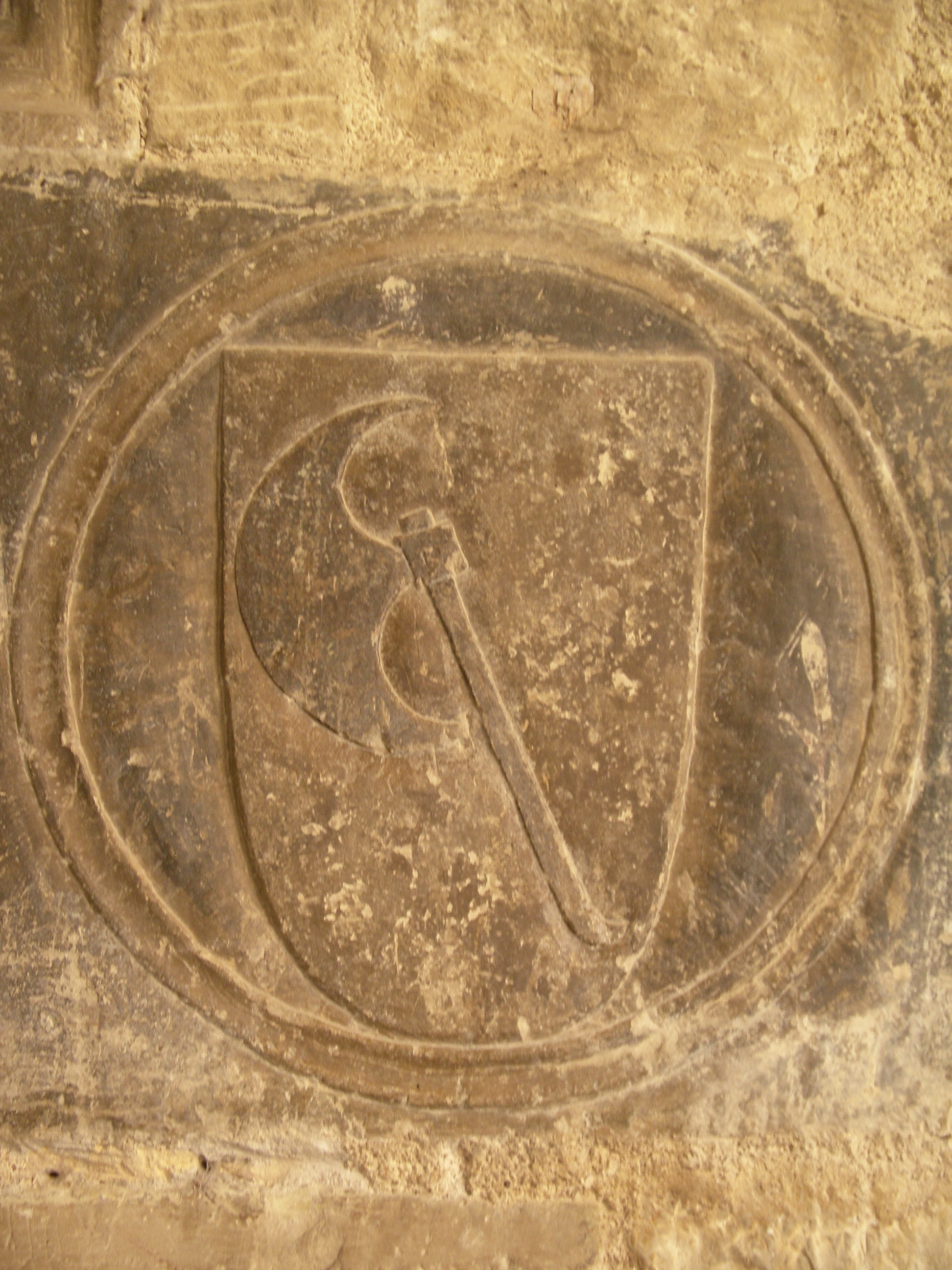
Emblem of the Order of the Hatchet in the stone of the cloister of the Cathedral of Tortosa, (c. 14th century)

The Order of the Hatchet (Catalan: Orde de l'Atxa; Spanish: Orden del Hacha) is a female honorific order supposedly founded in 1149, bestowed upon the women of the town of Tortosa, in Catalonia (Spain).

This order was founded during the Reconquista to honor women combatants in the site of Tortosa against The Taifa of Tortosa. During that year, amid heavy fighting between the two fronts, the taifa besieged Tortosa after a withdrawal of Berenguer. In the absence of men to defend the city, women joined the fight, dressing as men and attacking with hatchets and anything else they could lay their hands on. They successfully repelled the attackers. Their participation was essential to the defense of Tortosa. In appreciation of these facts, Count Ramon Berenguer instituted the order of the hatchet for women who participated in that defense, which brought them privileges and tax exemptions, among other things.

This was not a military order, but it was one of the few female honorific orders.

== Origin ==
The city of Tortosa, in northeastern Spain, was held by Moors until the Second Crusade. In 1148, Ramon Berenguer IV, Count of Barcelona led his forces to wrest control of the city. The crusading armies then moved on to attack other places. This left the city open to counter-attack in 1149. Moorish armies found the city well-defended, though, for the ladies of the town donned men's clothing and fought with whatever weapon was closest to hand, including hatchets. Berenguer was so impressed with the spirited defense that he created the Order of the Hatchet and bestowed it upon the women soldiers.

== Rights and Privileges ==
They were styled thus, according to Elias Ashmole, The Institution, Laws, and Ceremony of the Most Noble Order of the Garter (1672), Ch. 3, sect. 3:

The example is of the Noble Women of Tortosa in Catalonia, and recorded by Josef Micheli Marquez, who plainly calls them Cavalleros or Knights, or may I not rather say Cavalleras, seeing I observe the words Equitissae and Militissae (formed from the Latin Equites and Milites) heretofore applied to Women, and sometimes used to express Madams or Ladies, though now these Titles are not known".

Those in the Order were exempt from all taxes, and received precedence ahead of men in the public assemblies of the town. Furthermore, it was granted "that all the Apparel and Jewels, though of never so great value, left by their dead Husbands, should be their own".

== Status of the Order ==
No other members were admitted to the order, and it is presumed that the order went defunct when the last member died.

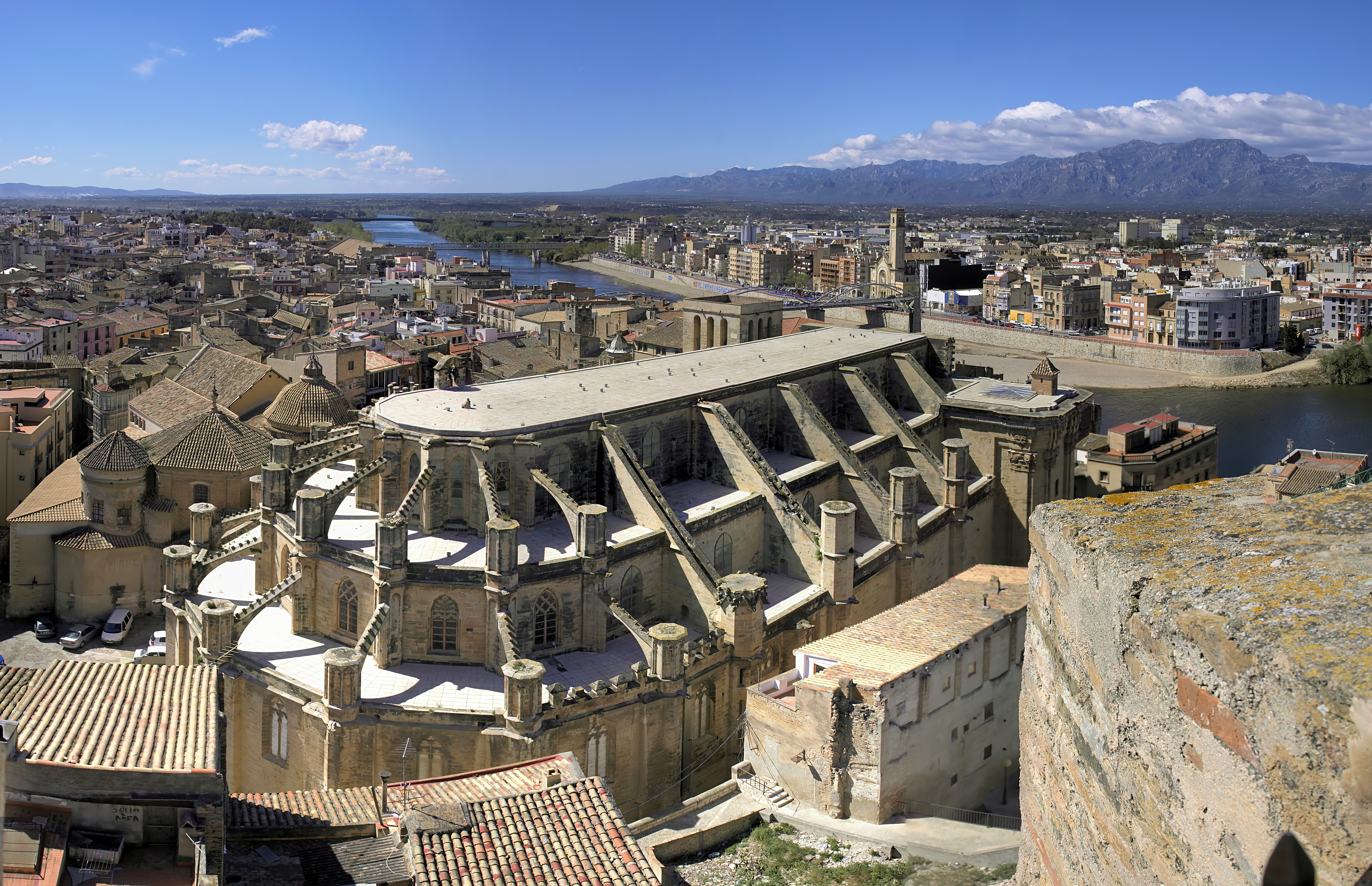
Modern-day Tortosa

== See also ==
- Spanish military orders

== Sources ==
Toton, Sir Edward III. Modern Chivalry (2013) "The Order of the Hatchet". Retrieved December 14, 2013.

Velde, Francois. "Women Knights of the Middle Ages". Retrieved December 14, 2013.

Zoltack, Nicole. "Female Knights and the Order of the Hatchet". Retrieved December 14, 2013.
