= Order of the Reason =

The Military Order of the Reason (Spanish: Orden de la Razón) was created in the year 1385. Along with the Order of the Pigeon was one of the two orders founded by King John I of Castile. Cristóbal Suárez de Figueroa, citing an earlier work, he said in his book Plaza universal de todas las ciencias y artes that in it were selected its members based on the value and skill shown in handling the weapons instead of the degree of nobility of their ancestors.

Also it came to naming hundred noble young noble of this order. Its emblem or badge consisted of a spear with the figure of a small heraldic shield on one of its extremities.

When they accompanied to the king, wearing a white banner bundled of ghouls and suspended from a gold chain.

== Sources and references ==
- Suárez de Figueroa, C. Plaza universal de todas las ciencias y artes. (Reissue Madrid, 1733).
