= Cruz Fidélitas =

- Awarded for: Long and faithful service as a military chaplain, or services to the Military Archbishopric of Spain
- Presented by: Spain
- Eligibility: Military chaplains, as well as other military personnel, civilians and institutions
- Status: Currently awarded
- Established: July 25, 2007
- Ribbon bar of the medal

Precedence
- Next (higher): Long Military Service Cross
- Next (lower): None

The Cruz Fidélitas (English: Fidelity Cross) is a medal of the Spanish Armed Forces, primarily awarded to military chaplains. It is awarded by the military archbishopric to reward faithful service by chaplains, as well as services to the archbishopric by deserving civilians, institutions and other military personnel.

== History ==
The Cruz Fidélitas was created by decree of then military archbishop Francisco Pérez González on July 25, 2007. The decree established the award as a decoration of the Military Archbishopric of Spain, rather than the military, and stipulated that only the current military archbishop had the authority to award grades of the Cruz Fidélitas. However, he may temporarily delegate the power to award any class of the award to any chaplain he sees fit, other than that of Grand Cross.

The names of those who receive the medal are published in the Official Bulletin of the Military Archbishopric of Spain.

== Classes ==
There are three classes of the Cruz Fidélitas that can be awarded to military chaplains. These are the Cruz de la Cruz Fidélitas (English: Cross of the Fidelity Cross), awarded for 15 years of service, the Encomienda de la Cruz Fidélitas (English: Commendation of the Fidelity Cross), awarded for 20 years of service, and the Plata de la Cruz Fidélitas (English:Plate of the Fidelity Cross), awarded for 25 years of service.

- Plate of the Cruz Fidélitas (First Class)
- Commendation of the Cruz Fidélitas (Second Class)
- Cross of the Cruz Fidélitas (Third Class)

Two classes of the Cruz Fidélitas also exist, which can only be awarded to non-chaplains. These are the Cruz de Honor de la Cruz Fidélitas (English: Cross of Honor of the Fidelity Cross), awarded for constant or highly effective service to the archbishopric, and the Gran Cruz de la Cruz Fidélitas (English: Grand Cross of the Fidelity Cross), awarded for exceptional and valuable service.

- Grand Cross of the Cruz Fidélitas
- Cross of Honor of the Cruz Fidélitas

== Insignia ==
The ribbon of the medal is purple, with two white stripes extending down each side. From the ribbon hands a white-enameled cross bordered in gold, with gold spikes extending between the arms. In the center of the cross is the emblem of the Military Archbishopric of Spain, enameled in red. The reverse of the medal features a capital letter "F" relieved in the center of the cross, and the year "2007" on the lower arm, also in relief. A gold crown is used to suspend the cross from the ribbon.

Aside from that of the Cross of Honor, the ribbon bars of each grade also bear a device, dependent on the grade received. The ribbon bars of the Plate, Commendation, and Cross of the Cruz Fidélitas bear a Latin cross fleury, in gold, silver or bronze, respectively. The ribbon bar of the Grand Cross features a Spanish Royal Crown.

== Notable recipients ==
=== Cross of Honor ===
- Antonio Padillo
- Don Alonso Ros Carrasco
- Juan Salvador

== See also ==
- Orders, decorations, and medals of Spain
- Military Archbishopric of Spain
