= Order of Sant Jordi d'Alfama =

Catalonia based military order of the Reconquista

Order of Sant Jordi d'Alfama Orde de Sant Jordi d'Alfama
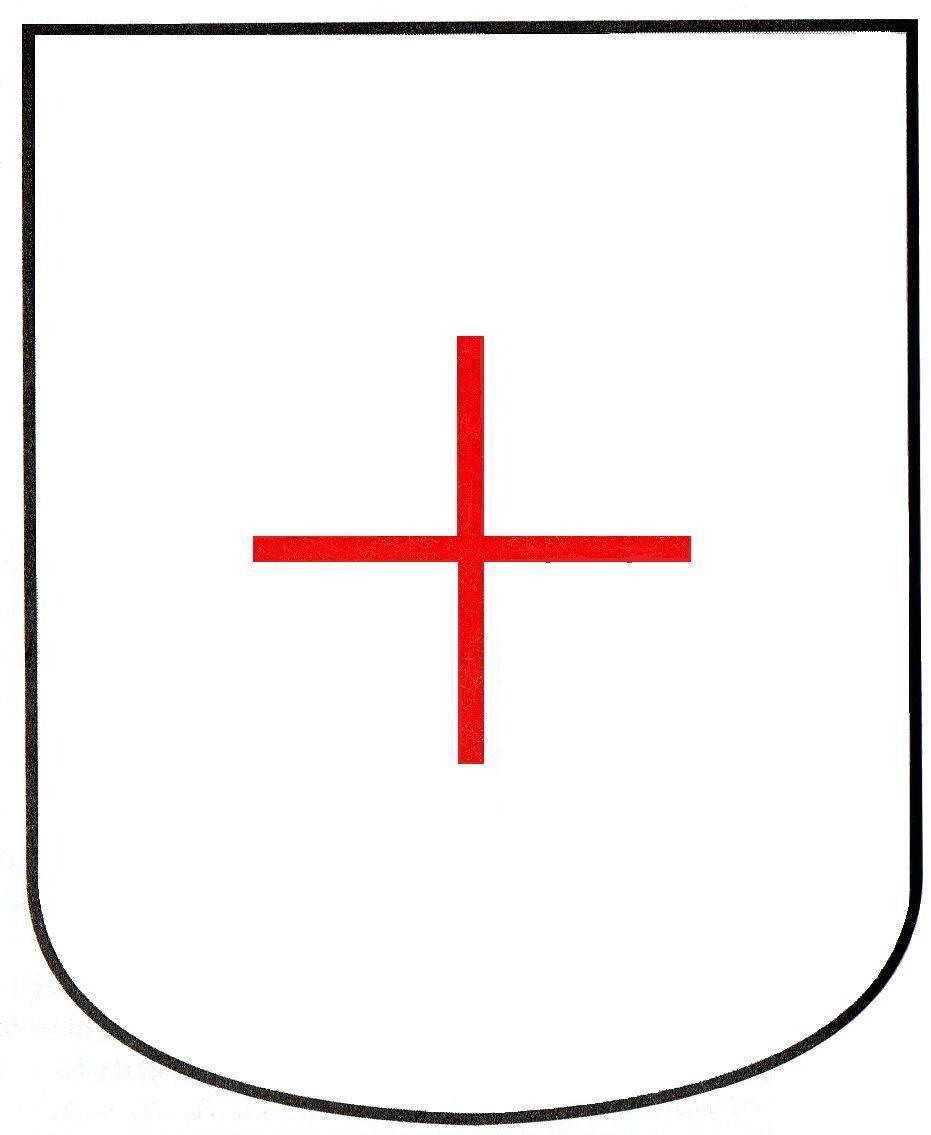
- The order's emblem, a red cross of Saint George
- Type: Military order
- Established: 1201; 825 years ago
- Country: Crown of Aragon
- Religious affiliation: Catholic Church
- Status: Merged into the Order of Montesa in 1400; 626 years ago
- Founder: Peter II of Aragon

The Order of Sant Jordi d'Alfama (Note: English: Order of Saint George of Alfama; Catalan: Orde de Sant Jordi d'Alfama, Spanish: Orden de San Jorge de Alfama, whose members are known as Sanjorgistas.) was a military order founded in 1201 by King Peter II of Aragon. Its original purpose was to support the resettlement of coastal area between the Coll de Balaguer and L'Ampolla, part of the Camp de Tarragona in Catalonia. This arid region was known at the time as Alfama, a toponym of Arabic origin. The order was dedicated to Saint George, whom the kings of Aragon regarded as their patron.

The Order of Sant Jordi was small. Its members were under the Rule of Saint Augustine until 1373, when Pope Gregory IX, at the request of King Peter IV, approved the Augustinian rules with customs specific to the order. A whole new rule was imposed by Peter IV in 1385. Their uniform consisted of a scapular in white serge and a matching cape with the red cross of Saint George on the left.

Most of the order's members were Catalans, both knights and dedicated clergy. The founding pair was the nobleman Joan d'Almenara and the subdeacon Martí Vidal. The leader of the order was originally the quaestor of alms, later called the prior, commander and grand commander until the title of master was finally conferred in 1355. The first master, Humbert Sescorts, was elected by the brothers. Royal influence, however, soon reached its peak. In 1365, the second master was appointed by the king.

In its first years, the order constructed a coastal castle, which was excavated by archaeologists in 1988. Under James I, the order took part in the conquest of Majorca (1229–1231) and the conquest of Valencia (1238). It was highly favoured by Peter IV and took part in his conquests of Majorca (1349) and Sardinia (1354) as well as his war with Castile (1356–1369).

The order was supported by royal donations and alms. Its original holdings were in the south of the Principality of Catalonia, a region known as New Catalonia. It established early commanderies at Bujaraloz in the Aragon proper and at Alcarràs near Lleida. In 1229, it sold its holdings at Bujaraloz to the Hospitallers of Sigena to pay of debts. James I donated lands in the newly conquered kingdoms of Valencia and Majorca. In the 14th century, new commanderies were established at the castle of Riquer in Catalonia and in Valencia. Heavily favoured by Peter IV, the order fell on hard times after his death. Its territorial base and thus its rents remained small. In 1368, it sent collectors seeking alms to France and England. It had only six members by the 1370s.

In 1399, responding to the pleas of the last master, Francesc Ripollès, King Martin the Humane decided to merge the order with the Order of Montesa. The merger was confirmed by Pope Benedict XIII in 1400. The red cross of Saint George became the symbol of the combined order.

== Leaders ==
The following is a chronological list of leaders of Sant Jordi d'Alfama by title with dates of attestation.

Quaestor of alms (questor elemosinarum)

- 1201–1213 Joan d'Almenara

Prior

- 1225 Guillem Auger
- 1229 Guillem de Cardona

Commander (comendator)

- 1233–1238 Guerau de Prat
- 1244–1254 Arnau de Castellvell
- 1286 Ramon de Guàrdia
- 1288–1303 Bernat Gros
- 1306 Domingo de Beri
- 1307–1312 Pere Guasc

Grand commander (comendator maior)

- 1313–1316 Pere Guasc
- 1317–1327 Jaume de Tàrrega
- 1327–1331 Pere Guasc
- 1337–1339 Guillem Vidal
- 1341–1355 Humbert Sescorts

Master (magister, maestre)

- 1355–1365 Humbert Sescorts
- 1365–1385 Guillem Castell
- 1387–1394 Cristóbal Gómez
- 1394–1400 Francesc Ripollès
