= Order of the Band =

- Emblem of the Order of the Band, the same of the Royal Bend of Castile.

Awarded by Alfonso XI of Castile
- Type: Chivalric order in one class
- Established: 1332
- Status: Disestablished
- Grades: Knight

The Order of the Band, Knights of the Band, or Equites Bindae, was a military order in Spain, instituted by Alfonso XI, King of Castile in 1332. It took its name from the banda, band, sash or red ribbon which was once worn by knights belonging to the order.

Membership of the order was awarded to certain distinguished knights and squires of the king, and had roots back as far as 1324. This order was only for nobility; the eldest sons of grandees were excluded; and a prerequisite to admittance was to have served at least ten years either in the army, or at court. They were bound to take up arms for Catholicism against infidels. The King himself was Grand Master of the order. After a period of decline it is considered to have been extinct by 1474.

== See also ==
- Female order of the Band
- Royal Bend of Castile
