= Medalla de Campaña =

- Front side of the Medalla de Campaña
- Type: Medal
- Presented by: Spain
- Eligibility: Civil and Military personnel
- Established: 25 May 2018
- ribbon bar

The Campaign Medal (Spanish: Medalla de Campaña ) is a Spanish permanent military decoration. The medal is awarded to members of the Spanish Armed Forces, Allied forces and civilians participating in foreign military campaigns without international military decorations. It was created on 25 May 2018.
