= Fuero de Sepúlveda =

Spanish municipal charter

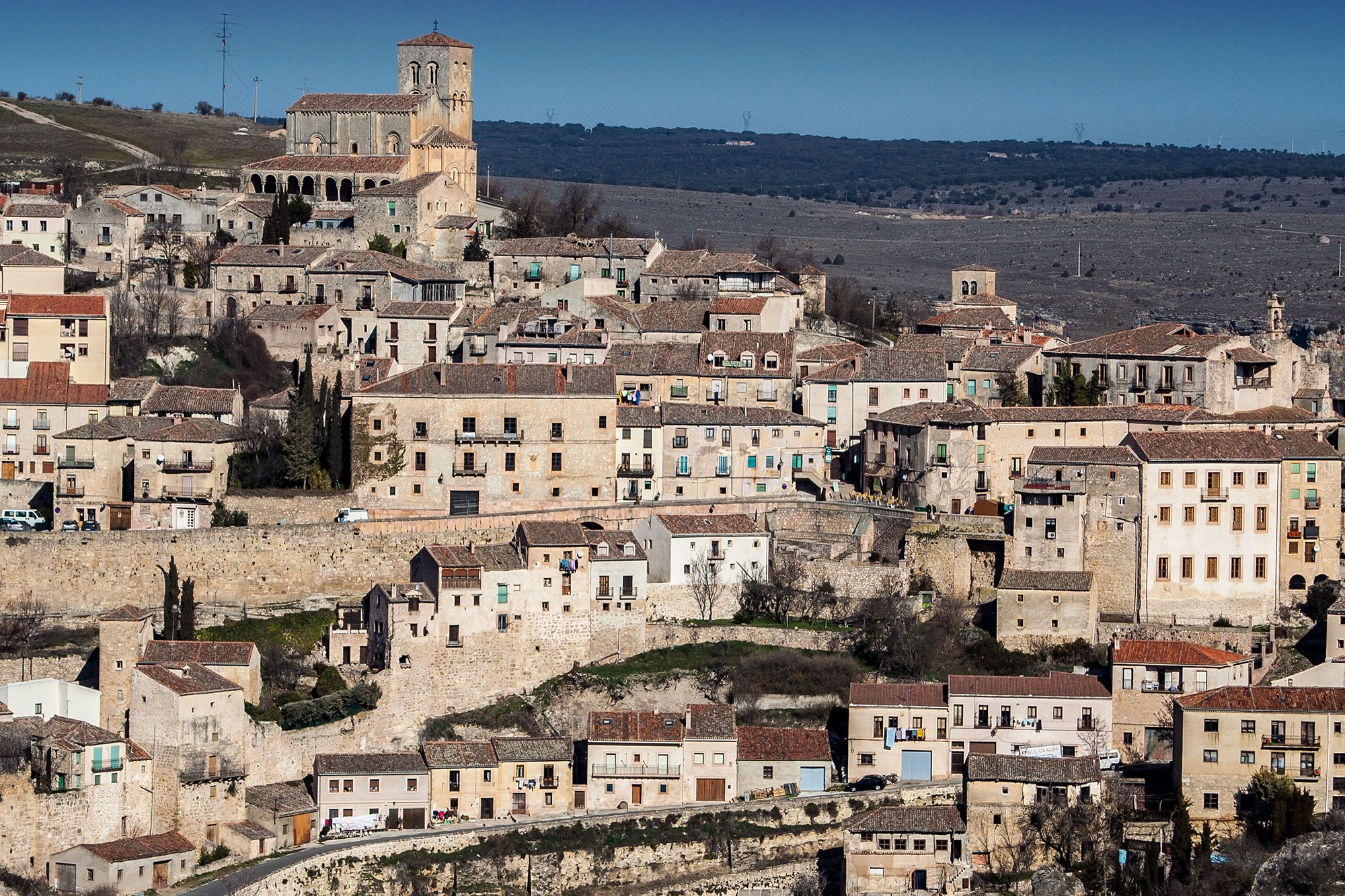
- General view of the Segovian town of Sepúlveda, which gives its name to the jurisdiction

Fernán González of Castile
- Long title: Municipal charter of the Community of Villa and Tierra de Sepúlveda
- Territorial extent: Community of Villa and Tierra de Sepúlveda
- Enacted by: Fernán González of Castile
- Commenced: 10. century
- Status: Withdrawn

The Fuero de Sepúlveda was a medieval municipal charter (fuero) that governed the towns that make up the Villa y Tierra de Sepúlveda. It was confirmed in 1076 by Alfonso VI of León and ratified by King Ferdinand IV of Castile in 1305. Its text reproduces privileges dating from 940 in the time of Count Fernán González. Its relevance in the Reconquest process led to its later application to other towns, such as Roa or Uclés (1179) in the Kingdom of Castilla and Teruel (1172) in the Kingdom of Aragon.
