= Order of the Dove =

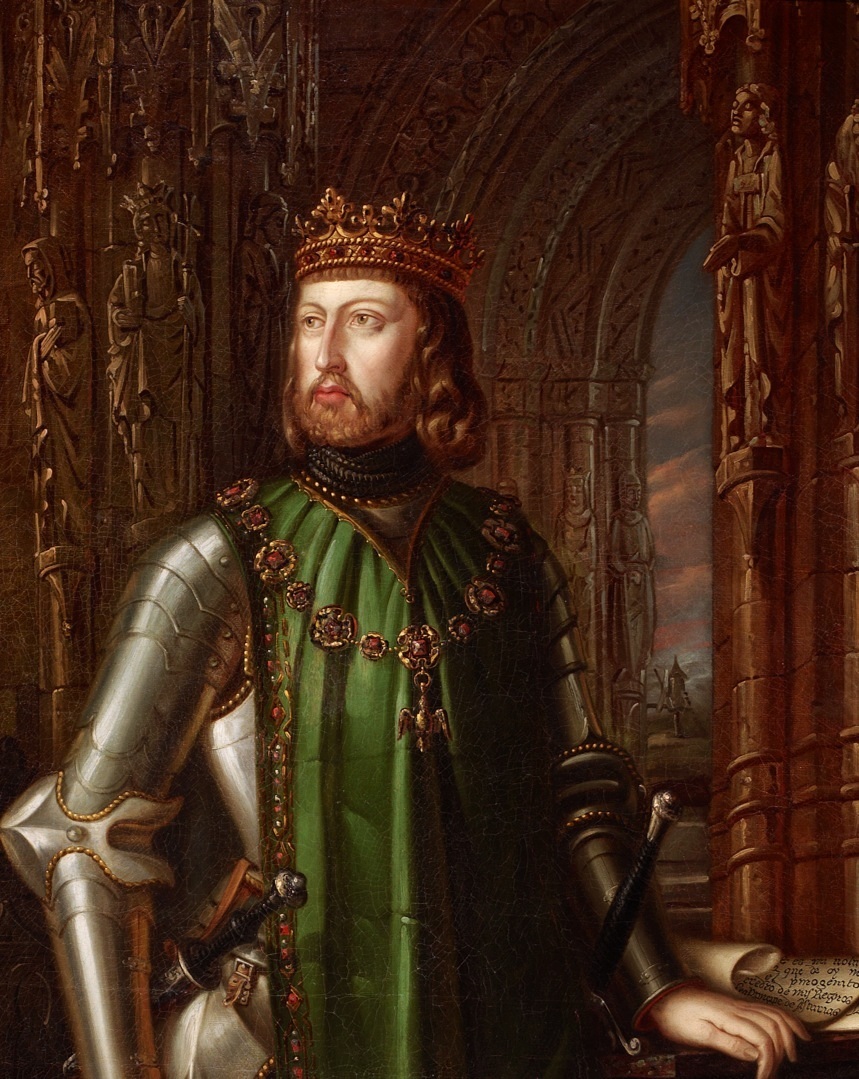
Oil paint dating from the 19th century exposed in the Congress of Deputies of Madrid, showing the necklace of the Order, which contains a pigeon.

The Order of the Dove (Spanish: Orden de la Paloma (or Order of the Pigeon, as the Spanish word paloma is used to refer to both doves and pigeons), was a short-lived military order, lasting for only one year after its inception. It was created by King Juan I of Castile in 1379 to defend the Catholic faith and the Kingdom of Castile.

== History ==
It had been doubted in the past which king of the Kingdom of Castile had created the order (another option being Henry III of Castile in 1399). Its primary purpose was to defend the Catholic faith and reinforce the authority of the Kingdom of Castile. The order was dissolved soon after, but regardless of its short life, it had become infamous due to its large feasts which included the consumption of pigeon (the order's namesake).

These large feasts and the name of the order itself directly contributed to its downfall.

Only honorable men could become knights of a military order. Thus, despite pigeon being a popular food during the period, it did not have a distinctive reputation as the pigeon held the connotation of promiscuity.

The insignia of the order was a chain necklace with an open wing pigeon.

The order eventually collapsed a year after in 1380.
