= Order of Montesa =

Christian military order in Spain

Order of Montesa Orde de Montesa
- The order's emblem, a red Greek cross within a black Cross of Calatrava
- Type: Religious Order of Honour and formerly a military order
- Country: Spain
- Royal house: Bourbon-Anjou
- Religious affiliation: Catholic
- Sovereign: King Felipe VI

Precedence
- Equivalent: Order of Santiago; Order of Calatrava; Order of Alcántara
- Ribbon bar

The Orde Militar de Santa Maria de Montesa, often shortened to Order of Montesa (Catalan: Orde de Montesa, Aragonese and Spanish: Orden de Montesa) is a Christian military order, territorially limited to the old Crown of Aragon. It was named after the castle of Montesa, its headquarters.

== Templar background ==
The Knights Templar had been received with enthusiasm within the Crown of Aragon from their foundation in 1119. King Alfonso I of Aragon, having no direct heir, bequeathed his dominions to be divided among the Knights Templar, the Knights Hospitaller, and the Order of the Holy Sepulchre, but this bequest was annulled by his subjects in 1131. The Knights Templar had to be contented with certain castles, the chief of which was Monzón. Although the Aragonese branch of the order was pronounced innocent at the famous trial of the Templars, Pope Clement V's Bull of suppression was applied to them in spite of the protests of King James II of Aragon in 1312.

== Establishment of new order ==
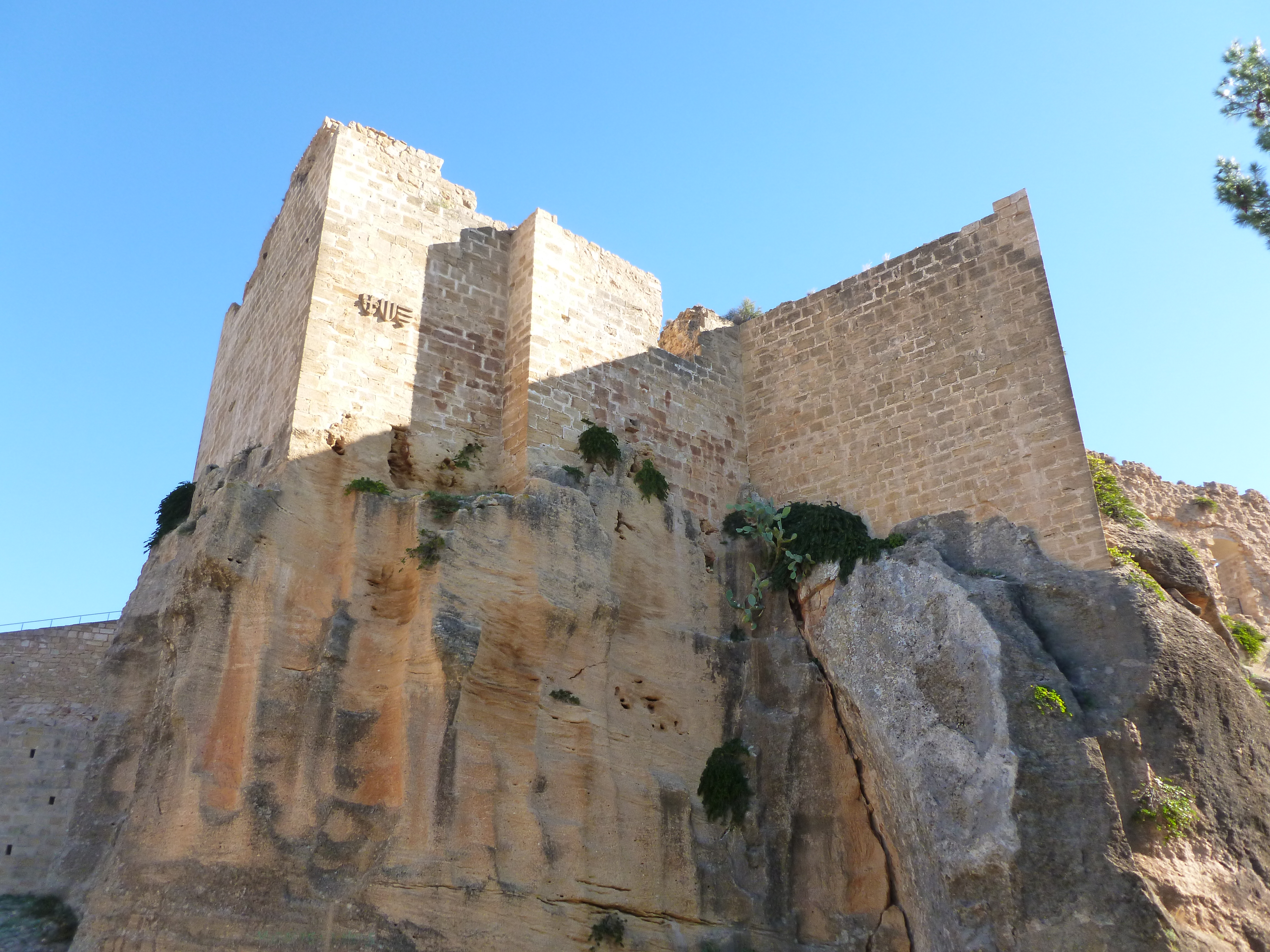
Ruins of the castle of Montesa, former parent headquarters of the order

King James II persuaded Pope John XXII to permit him to regroup the Templar properties in Aragon and Valencia, and to create a new military order not essentially differing from that of the Templars, which should be charged with the defence of the frontier against the Moors and the pirates. The new order was dedicated to Our Lady, and based at Montesa. Pope John XXII approved it on 10 June 1317, and gave it the Cistercian rule.

The order derived its title from St. George of Montesa, its principal stronghold. It was affiliated to the Order of Calatrava, from which its first recruits were drawn, and it was maintained in dependence upon that order.

The first of the fourteen grand masters was Guillermo d'Eril. In 1485, Philip of Viana renounced the Archbishopric of Palermo to become grand master. He died fighting the Emirate of Granada in 1488. The office of grand master was united with the Crown by Philip II in 1587.
