= Fernando Gutiérrez Tello =

Fernando Gutiérrez Tello was a Spanish noble in the service of the Kingdom of Castile. He was the archdeacon of the Archdiocese of Seville from 12 April 1304 to 23 April 1323. He is best known for his command over the Castilian forces in Ferdinand IV's campaign against the Emirate of Granada in 1309 in the context of the Spanish Reconquista. Most notably, he commanded Castilian troops in the Siege of Gibraltar along with Juan Núñez II de Lara, Alonso Pérez de Guzmán and Garci López de Padilla, the Grand Master of the Order of Calatrava. Together, the group took control of the city of Gibraltar from the Moors on 12 September 1309. Gutiérrez Tello was also part of the less successful siege on Algeciras of that same year.

The city was retaken by the Moors in 1333.

== See also ==
- Archdiocese of Seville
- Reconquista
- Ferdinand IV of Castile
- Siege of Gibraltar (1309)
