= Raymond of Fitero =

Monk, abbot, and founder of the Order of Calatrava

Saint Raymond of Fitero
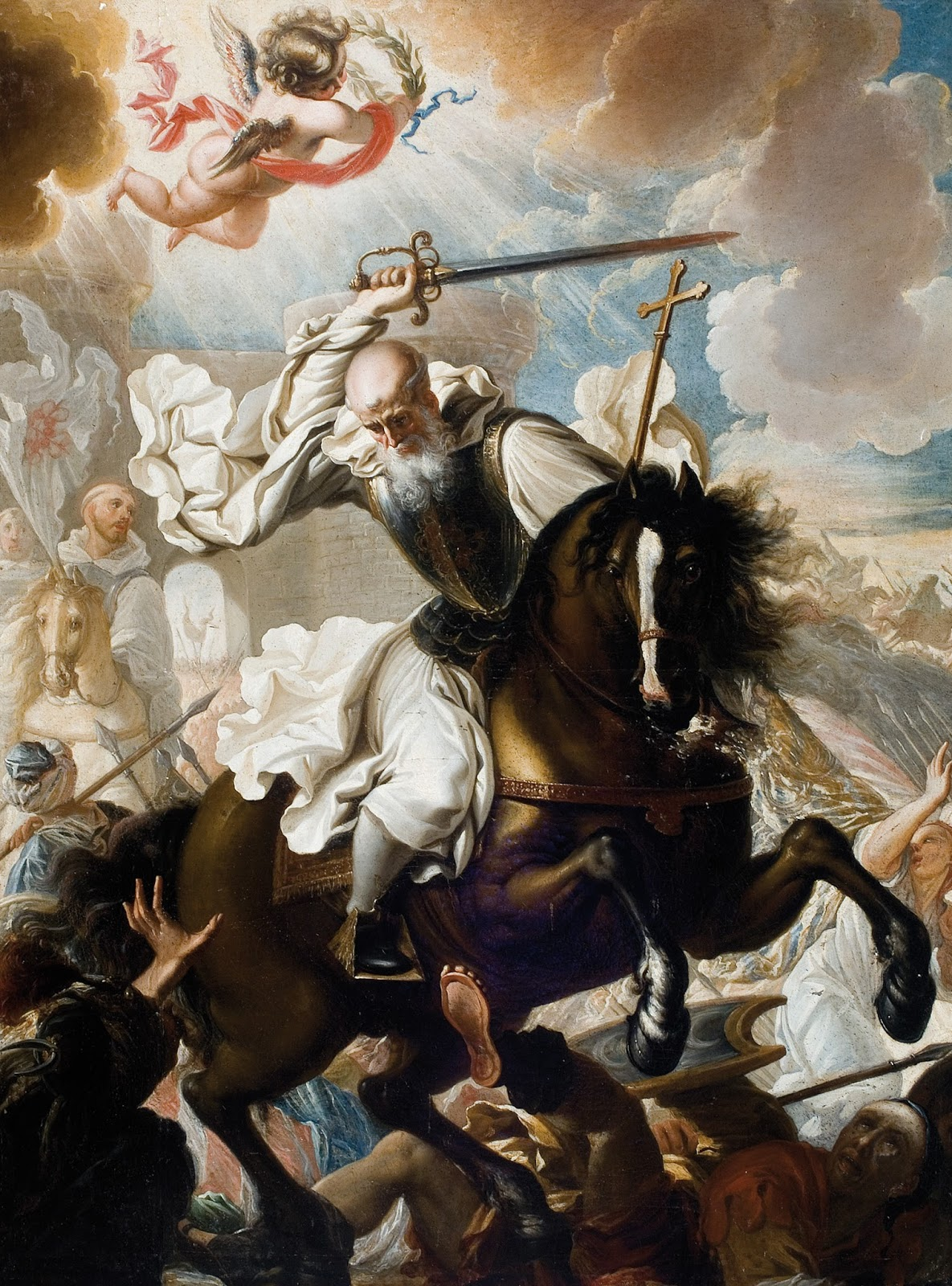
- The Defence of Calahorra by Miguel Jacinto Meléndez, c. 1730
- Born: ? unknown
- Died: 1163 AD; Ciruelos, Toledo, Spain
- Venerated in: Roman Catholic Church
- Canonized: cult approved in 1719
- Feast: March 15; February 1

Raymond of Fitero (also known as Ramon Sierra, Spanish: San Raimundo de Fitero) (d. Ciruelos, Toledo, 1163) was a monk, abbot, and founder of the Order of Calatrava.

His birthplace is unknown; Saint-Gaudens (France), Tarazona (Aragon), and Barcelona (Catalonia) have all claimed to be Raymond's birthplace.

As a young man, Raymond felt a religious vocation, and became a canon of the new cathedral at Tarazona, established after King Alfonso I of Aragon reconquered the historic city from the Moors in 1119.

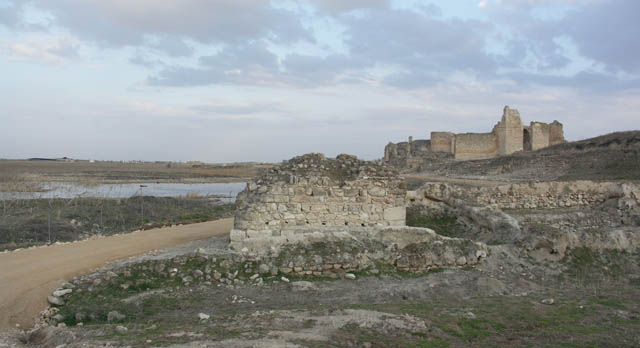
Calatrava la Vieja

Across the Pyrenees mountains, at Escaladieu Abbey in Gascony, Raymond became a monk of the Cistercian Order, which had been founded relatively recently (in 1098) and which accepted many former knights as members. When King Alfonso VII of Castile supported the order's extension into Spain, Raymond joined abbot Durando (a.k.a. Durandus, Durand) and other monks and established a new monastery near the Ebro River at Nienzabas (Niencebas), between Calahorra (reconquered from the Moors in 1045) and Tudela (which Alfonso I had recaptured from the Moors in 1114 and was still subject to raids). At Durando's death, fellow monks elected Raymond (who had been prior) his successor. The monks then moved across the Ebro to strategic Castejón, Navarre, and finally built their new monastery at a spot named Fitero (Castellón de Fitero), situated slightly up the Alhama river from Castejón along the frontier between Castile's La Rioja region and the Kingdom of Navarre. They called their new monastery the Monasterio de Santa María la Real de Fitero.

When King Alfonso VII died in 1158, Raymond went to Toledo so that the new king, Sancho III of Castile, could confirm the privileges that his father had granted the new monastery. In Toledo Raymond's companion, former knight Father Diego Velásquez, learned that Christian leaders planned a major offensive south against the Moors. Furthermore, Sancho promised to grant the strategic town of Calatrava (Calatrava la Vieja) on the Guadiana River to anyone who promised to defend it from the Moors, who might themselves be planning a sally north to test the new Christian king. His father had reconquered Calatrava in 1147, and it was on the road from Toledo (reconquered in 1085) to Córdoba and Moorish strongholds.

Encouraged by Father Diego, Raymond took up the challenge, and Sancho granted them the privilege of defending Calatrava. With the support of the Archbishop of Toledo, Raymond organized an army that successfully prevented a Moorish attack on Calatrava that year.

This success prompted Raymond to found the military Order of Calatrava, organized along Cistercian lines. Raymond then moved some fighting monks south from the relatively safe Fitero in Navarre to Calatrava in what became the Castilla-La Mancha province. He himself retired to Ciruelos, near Ocaña, where he died in 1163. On September 26, 1164 Pope Alexander III recognized the new military order, which played a crucial role in the Reconquest.
