= List of grand masters of the Order of Calatrava =

The following is an incomplete list of former grand masters of the Order of Calatrava, the current grand master of the order is King Felipe VI of Spain

1. Don García (1164–1169)
2. Fernando Icaza (1169–1170)
3. Martín Pérez de Siones (1170–1182)
4. Nuño Pérez de Quiñones (1182–1199)
5. Martín Martínez (1199–1207)
6. Ruy Díaz de Yanguas (1207–1212)
7. Rodrigo Garcés (1212–1216)
8. Martín Fernández de Quintana (1216–1218)
9. Gonzalo Yáñez de Novoa (1218–1238)
10. Martín Ruiz de Cevallos (1238–1240)
11. Gómez Manrique (1240–1243)
12. Fernando Ordóñez (1243–1254)
13. Pedro Yáñez (1254–1267)
14. Juan González (1267–1284)
15. Ruy Pérez Ponce de León (1284–1295)
16. Diego López de Santsoles (1295–1296)
17. Garci López de Padilla (1296–1322)
18. Juan Núñez de Prado (1322–1355)
19. Diego García de Padilla (1355–1365)
20. Martín López de Córdoba (1365–1371)
21. Pedro Muñiz de Godoy y Sandoval (1371–1384)
22. Pedro Álvarez de Pereira (1384–1385)
23. Gonzalo Núñez de Guzmán (1385–1404)
24. Enrique de Villena (1404–1407)
25. Luis González de Guzmán (1407–1443)
26. Fernando de Padilla (a few months in 1443)
27. Alfonso de Aragón y de Escobar (end of 1443–1445)
28. Pedro Girón Acuña Pacheco (1445–1466)
29. Rodrigo Téllez Girón (1466–1482)
30. García López de Padilla (1482–1487)
31. Catholic Monarchs (from 1487 onwards)
32. King Juan Carlos I of Spain
33. King Felipe VI of Spain (Incumbent)

== Bibliography ==
- RODRÍGUEZ-PICAVEA MATILLA, ENRIQUE (July–December 2007). CABALLERÍA Y NOBLEZA EN LA ORDEN DE CALATRAVA: CASTILLA, 1350-1450 [Knighthood and Nobility in the Military Order of Calatrava: Castile, 1350-1450] (in Spanish and English). Vol. Anuario de Estudios Medievales (AEM). Madrid: Universidad Autónoma de Madrid. ISSN 0066-5061.
