= First siege of Gibraltar =

1309 Reconquista battle

Coordinates: 36.15°N 5.35°W

- Part of the Battle of the Strait during the Reconquista
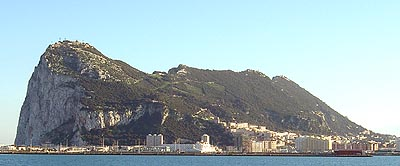
- View of Gibraltar from the West.
Date	1309 – 12 September 1309
Location	Gibraltar
Result	Castilian victory

Belligerents
Crown of Castile; Order of Santiago; Order of Calatrava	Emirate of Granada

Commanders and leaders
Ferdinand IV of Castile; Juan Núñez II de Lara; Alonso Pérez de Guzmán; Fernando Gutiérrez Tello; Garci López de Padilla; Juan de Castilla el de Tarifa	Muhammed III; Abu'l-Juyush Nasr

Strength
Thousands (Unknown)	1,200 defenders

The first siege of Gibraltar was a battle of the Spanish Reconquista that took place in 1309. The battle pitted the forces of the Crown of Castile (mostly those from the military councils of the city of Seville) under the command of Juan Núñez II de Lara and Alonso Pérez de Guzmán, against the forces of the Emirate of Granada who were under the command of Sultan Muhammed III and his brother, Abu'l-Juyush Nasr.

The battle resulted in a victory for the Crown of Castile, one of the few victories in what turned out to be a disastrous campaign. The taking of Gibraltar greatly increased the relative power of Castile on the Iberian Peninsula though the actual city was later recaptured by Muslim forces during the third siege of Gibraltar in 1333.

== Context ==
On 19 December 1308, at Alcalá de Henares, King Ferdinand IV of Castile and the ambassadors from the Crown of Aragon, Bernat de Sarrià and Gonzalo García agreed to the terms of the Treaty of Alcalá de Henares. Ferdinand IV, supported by his brother, Pedro de Castilla y Molina, the archbishop of Toledo, the bishop of Zamora, and Diego López V de Haro agreed to wage war against the Emirate of Granada by 24 June 1309 which was also when a previous peace treaty between Granada and Castile was set to expire. It was further agreed that the Aragonese monarch, James II, could not sign a separate peace accord with the Emir of Granada. A combined Aragonese-Castilian navy was also formed to support the siege in a blockade of the coastal Granadian towns. It was also stipulated that the Crown of Castile would attack the towns of Algeciras and Gibraltar and that the Aragonese forces would attempt to conquer the city of Almería.

Ferdinand IV promised to cede one sixth of the conquered Granadan territory to the Aragonese crown and therefore chose the entirety of the Kingdom of Almeria as its limits for the agreement with the exception of the towns of Bedmar, Alcaudete, Quesada, Arenas, and Locubin which would stay as part of Castile, having all previously been part of the Kingdom of Castile and León prior to their Muslim takeovers. Ferdinand IV further stipulated that if the lands taken from the Kingdom of Almería did not amount to one sixth of Granadan territory, that the Archbishop of Toledo would step in to resolve any differences related to the matter. These concessions to the Crown of Aragon led a few of Ferdinand IV's vassals to protest the ratification of the treaty, amongst them were John of Castile and Juan Manuel, Prince of Villena.

The concessions to Aragon, which had begun a period of relative irrelevancy compared to Castile, would once again restore the kingdom's power within the Iberian Peninsula. Aragon had previously reached its height under the Treaty of Cazola and the Treaty of Almizra which saw its territory and influence expand considerably. Ferdinand insisted on the Aragonese alliance to cement an alliance between Aragon and the Marinid dynasty so that they would not intervene in the coming war with Granada.

After the signing of the treaty at Alcalá de Henares, Castile and Aragon both sent emissaries to the court at Avignon to gain the support of Pope Clement V and to obtain the clerical backing of an official Crusade to further support military operations. They also asked for the papal blessing of a marriage between the Infanta Eleanor of Castile, the firstborn daughter of Ferdinand IV and Jaime de Aragón y Anjou, son and heir of James II of Aragon. The Pope agreed to both ventures and on 24 April 1309, Clement V issued the papal bull Indesinentis cure which authorised a general crusade against Granada to conquer the Iberian Peninsula together with mandates to conquer Corsica and Sardinia.

At the Courts of Madrid of 1309, the first courts to ever occur in the actual Spanish capital, Ferdinand IV publicly announced his desire to wage war against the Emirate of Granada and demanded subsidies to begin battle manoeuvres.

== Castilian mobilisation ==
The main vassals contributing to operations against Gibraltar were Juan Núñez II de Lara, Alonso Pérez de Guzmán, Fernando Gutiérrez Tello, the Archbishop of Seville and Garci López de Padilla, the grand master of the Order of Calatrava. The majority of this army consisted of the militia councils of Seville and the noblemen of that city.

On 29 April 1309, Pope Clement V issued the papal bull Prioribus decanis which officially conceded to Ferdinand IV one 10th of all clergy taxes collected in his kingdoms for three years to aid in financing the campaign against Granada.

From Toledo, Ferdinand IV and his army marched to Córdoba where the emissaries of James II announced that the Aragonese king was prepared to besiege the city of Almeria. Final preparations for the siege were carried out in Seville, where Ferdinand IV arrived in July 1309. The supply line for the invasion army passed through Seville and crossed the Guadalquivir River and travelled by sea to the territories of the Kingdom of Granada.

== Siege ==
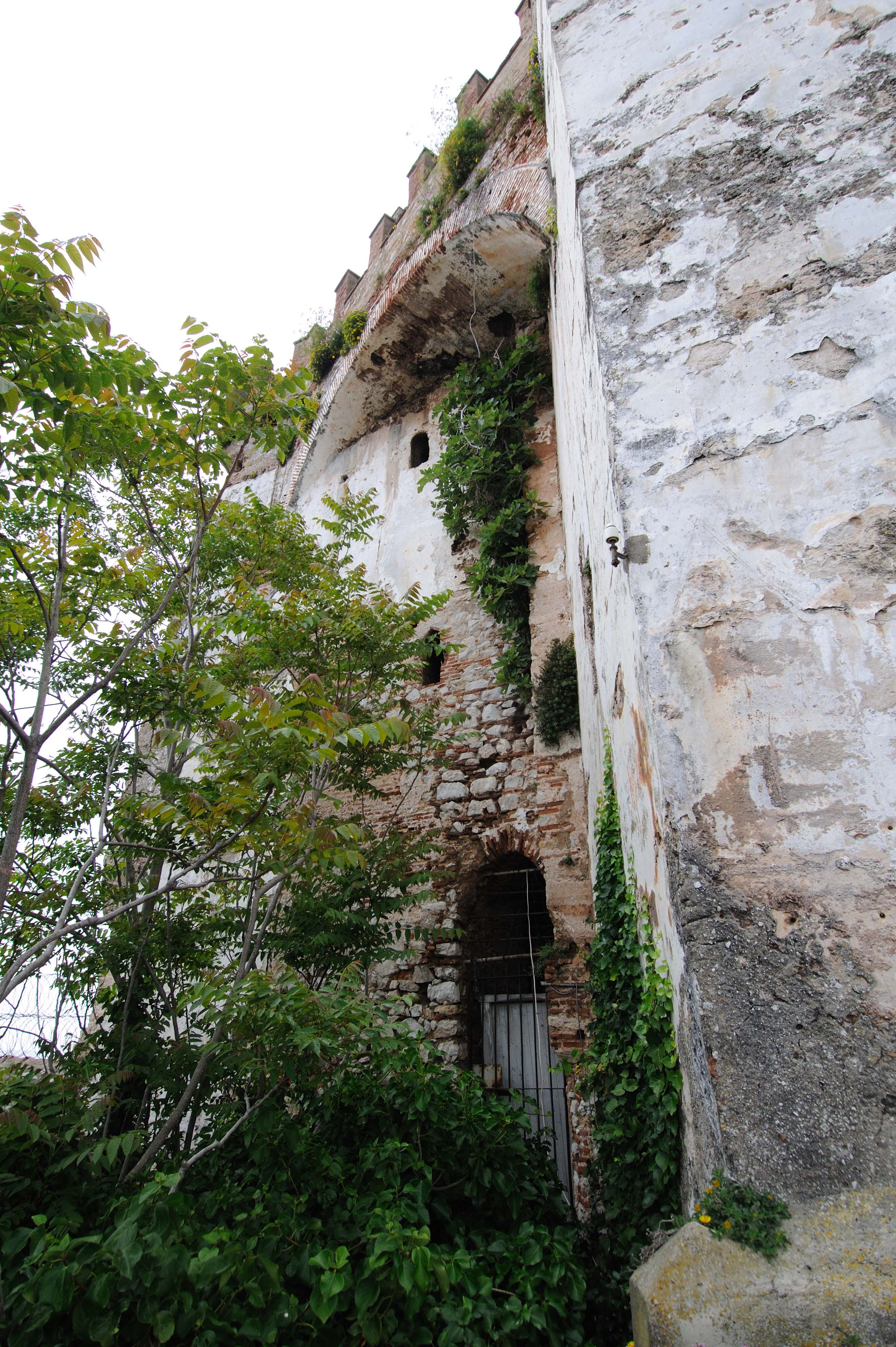
Some of the Moorish fortifications of Gibraltar, dating to this period, still stand today. The most prominent being the remains of the Moorish Castle.

After the start of the siege of Algeciras, Ferdinand IV sent part of his army from the military councils of Seville to complete their remaining objective of capturing Gibraltar, whilst keeping the larger portion of his forces encamped around Algeciras. The force sent to besiege and capture Gibraltar was put under the command of Juan Núñez II de Lara, Alonso Pérez de Guzmán, Fernando Gutiérrez Tello, the Archbishop of Seville and the council of nobles associated with that city. The group was further bolstered by Garci López de Padilla, the contemporary grand master of the Order of Calatrava and a contingent of his knights.

The forces from the Crown of Aragon, under the command of James II had already begun their own war against the Kingdom of Granada and were in place besieging the city of Almería by 15 August 1309. That ill-fated venture lasted until 26 January 1310 when the forces of Aragon were obliged to withdraw from the campaign due to stalemate.

The chronicles of Ferdinand IV mention that the Castilian forces surrounded the city of Gibraltar and besieged it with two engeños (or siege machines of an unspecified type) that began to fire into the city from towers built by the besiegers. The same chronicle states that the troops of Núñez de Lara and those of Alonso Pérez de Guzmán had enveloped the town so effectively that the Muslim defenders were powerless to resist their attackers, being forced to surrender the city rather after an extended and gallant defence. Guzmán and Lara allowed for some 1,125 Muslim inhabitants of the city to leave unharmed.

On 12 September 1309, Ferdinand IV's army officially occupied Gibraltar. According to the Castilian king's chronicle, when Ferdinand IV entered the city, one local Muslim elder told him that he had been present at three previous cities where Christian forces had expelled him. First at the city of Seville where he was expelled by Ferdinand IV's great grandfather, Ferdinand III, second at Xerez where he was expelled by Ferdinand IV's grandfather, Alfonso X, third by Ferdinand IV's father, Sancho IV when his forces took the city of Tarifa, and now finally again by Ferdinand IV himself. The original Spanish language text from this passage is as follows:

Señor, que oviste conmigo en me echar de aquí; ca tu visabuelo el rey D. Fernando quando tomó a Sevilla me echó dende é vine a morar á Xerez, é después el rey D. Alfonso, tu abuelo, quando tomó a Xerez hechome dende é yo vine á morar a Tarifa, é cuydando que estaba en lugar salvo, vino el rey D. Sancho, tu padre, é tomó a Tarifa é hechome dende, é vine a morar aquí á Gibraltar, é teniendo que en ningún lugar non estaría tan en salvo en toda la tierra de los moros de aquende la mar como aquí. É pues veo que en ningún lugar destos non-puedo fincar, yo yré allende la mar é me porné en lugar do biva en salvo é acabe mis días.

— Fernando IV de Castilla

The Castilian victory at Gibraltar ended almost 600 years of Muslim rule over the city.

== Aftermath ==
After the conquest of Gibraltar, Ferdinand IV ordered the repair of the city defences which had been damaged during the assault. He also ordered the construction of a new tower to defend the city walls. He further ordered the building of a shipyard that would serve to shelter passing ships. He then returned with his army to Algeciras, where the Castilian forces, being unable to take the great fortress town, were obliged to retreat. This ended their campaign against Granada, at great cost to Castile that was only mitigated by its success at Gibraltar and the cession of the border towns of Quesada, Quadros, Belmar and a payment of 5,000 golden pistoles.

The Muslim historian Ahmed Mohammed al-Maqqari writes of the Algeciras campaign in a similar form, saying:

In the year 709 (beginning June, a.d. 1309), the King of Castile, Herando (Ferdinand IV.), laid siege to Algeciras. He remained before that city from the 21st day of Safar to the end of Shaban, when, desparing of reducing that place, he raised the siege, though not without making himself master of Gibraltar.

— Ahmed Mohammed al-Maqqari

In the immediate aftermath of the peace treaty, the Emir of Granada, Muhammed III found himself almost immediately under attack from his vassals who were angry of his concessions to Ferdinand IV. Upon the discovery of an attempt on his life, Muhammed III travelled back to Granada where the populace was up in arms and his brother, Nasr Abul Geoix had installed himself on the throne. Muhammed III was made to watch his ministers be slaughtered and his palace plundered. He abdicated in favour of his brother shortly afterwards.

Ferdinand IV appointed one of the besieging officers, Alfonzo Fernando de Mendoza, to the post of governor of the newly captured city. By 1310, Ferdinand IV issued edicts initiating a repoblación of Gibraltar. One of the incentives offered for this repoblación was that all "swindlers, thieves, murderers and wives escaped from their husbands" could take refuge in the city and be free of any prosecution from the law, including the penalty of death (although this provision did not extend to traitors to the crown). Further, he decreed that no duty could be imposed on any goods passing in and out of the city but the number of disreputable people residing in the city significantly dampened repopulation efforts. In February and March 1310, Ferdinand IV rewarded the town of Seville whose militias had been instrumental in the victory at Gibraltar, offering its people various privileges.

== See also ==
- Siege of Algeciras (1309)
- Juan Núñez II de Lara
- Ferdinand IV of Castile
- Alonso Pérez de Guzmán
- Muhammed III, Sultan of Granada
