= Enrique de Villena =

15th-century Spanish writer and translator

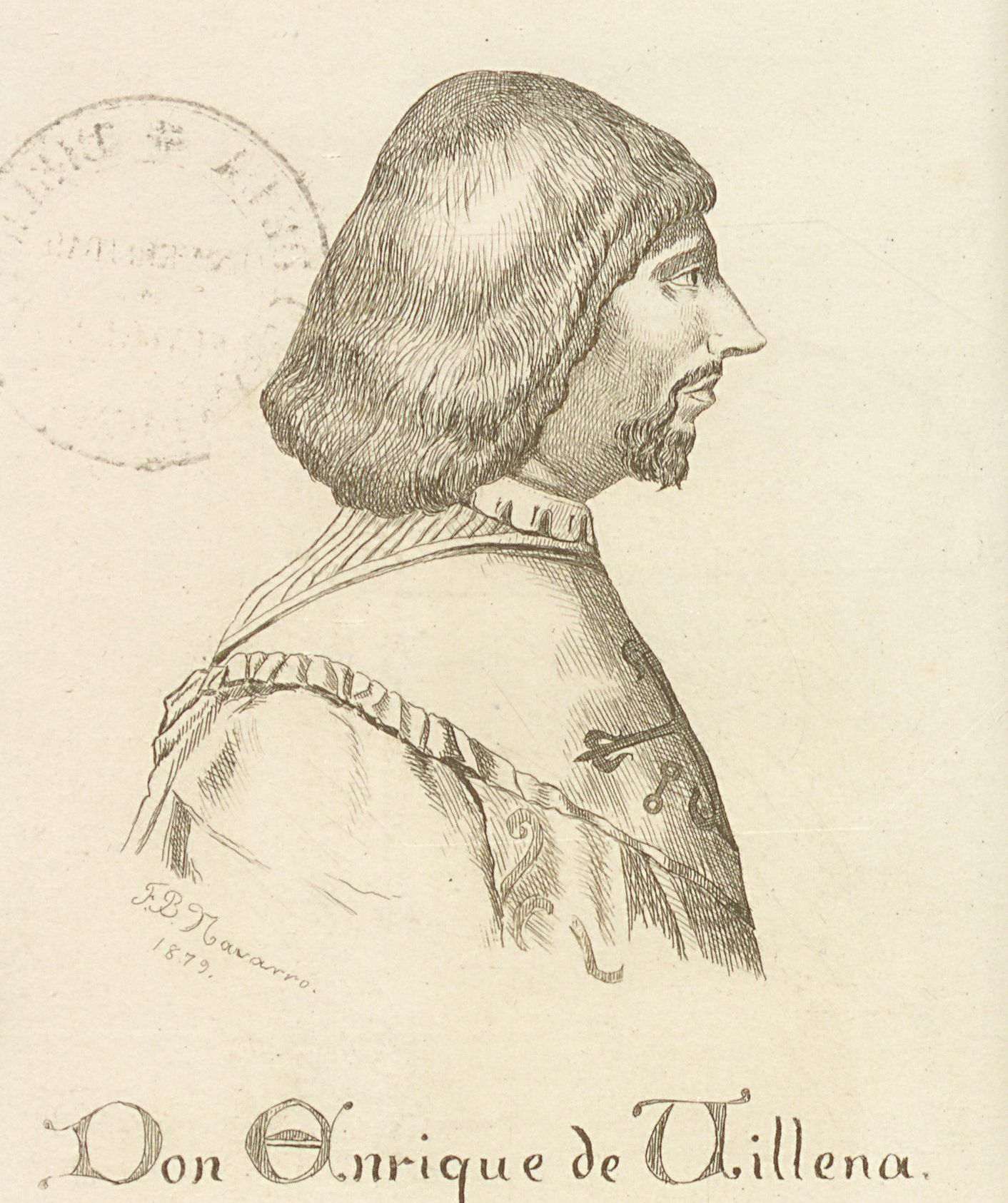
Enrique de Villena

Enrique de Villena (1384–1434), also known as Henry de Villeine and Enrique de Aragón, was a Spanish nobleman, writer, theologian and poet. He was also the last legitimate member of the House of Barcelona, the former royal house of Aragon. When political power was denied to him, he turned to writing. He was persecuted by Alfonso V of Aragon and John II of Castile owing to his reputation as a necromancer.

== Life ==
He was born in Torralba de Cuenca, in Castile as son of Pedro de Aragón y Villena (1362-1385) and Joanna of Castile, natural daughter of King Henry II of Castile. After the death of his father, Enrique went to the Aragonese court. There he was raised by his aristocratic grandfather, Alfonso de Aragón, first Marquess of Villena, who was a grandson of King James II of Aragon and Blanche of Naples.
At court he met the leading literary and intellectual minds of his era and became skilled in mathematics, chemistry and philosophy. The Aragonese queen, Violant of Bar, aware of Villena's academic gifts, invited him to study at the royal court of Barcelona, where Villena met the leading authors of Catalan literature. This experience further solidified Villena's already promising future.

However, Villena encountered difficulty towards the end of the fourteenth century when his grandfather began losing power in the Castilian court. By 1398, Alfonso had lost his position as marquess of Villena. This loss did not rest well with either Alfonso or Villena. Alfonso spent the next many years attempting to re-instate his grandson as marquess of Villena. Meanwhile, Villena straightforwardly declared himself Marquess of Villena, signing all official documents in this name, though this was not legally correct.

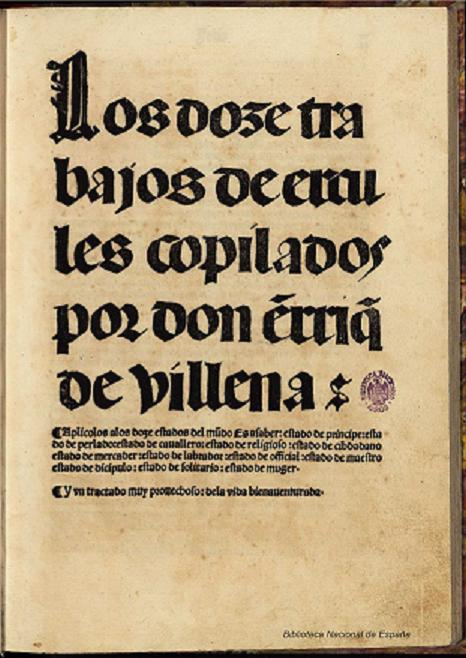
Titlepage of the 1499 edition of Los doce Trabajos de Hércules

Historians believe Villena traveled to Castile during the first years of the fifteenth century, took residence there, and married María de Albornoz, a wealthy heiress from Cuenca, Spain. Continuing this rise towards aristocratic prominence, Villena soon received titles as count of Cangas (Note: There are three places in Spain called Cangas. Two of them are in Asturias, which had been subject to the crown of Castile since the late 1300s Cangas de Onís and Cangas del Narcea. Of the two, Cangas del Narcea is closer to Tineo, and indeed was at one time called Cangas de Tineo. The evidence is not conclusive, but it may be the most likely place.) and Tineo, offered to him by his cousin, King Henry III of Castile, who had taken Villena's wife for a mistress. However, in 1404, Villena resigned from the court to pursue world travel. That same year, Villena tried to become master of the Order of Calatrava, a prestigious religious and military order. Pursuing this position, Enrique divorced his wife, claiming impotence, and renounced his position as count so he could officially become a friar of Calatrava. The King of Castile mandated that the comendadores (commanders) of Calatrava promote Enrique as master of the Order. This position, however, did not suit Villena well for, although intelligent, he was not politically competent. Authorities soon stripped him of his leadership position.

Fortunately for Villena, he received a token of good fortune when his cousin, Infante Ferdinand of Castile, became King of Aragon in 1412. Villena enjoyed several years of tranquil peace as Fernando's personal assistant. However, upon Ferdinand I's death in 1416, Villena returned to Castile and spent the next several years at his wife's estates in Cuenca taking care of family affairs. He obtained the lordship of Miesta, and, conscious of his unsuitability for warfare or political life, dedicated himself to literature. He also had affairs with other aristocratic ladies. As a result, he had two daughters born out of wedlock. One of them lived from 1430 to 1490, was baptized as Elionor Manuel, and entered under the name of Isabel de Villena a convent in Valencia. There she became abbess in 1463 and wrote a Vita Christi that was published posthumously by the new abbess in 1497.

During 1420 to 1425 not much is known about Villena other than that he wrote Arte Cisoria and various treatises during this time. From 1426 to 1429, Alfonso the Magnanimous stripped Villena of his promised inheritance as Duke of Gandía, giving the position instead to his own brother. Thus, facing financial straits, Villena depended on his nephew for economic support until his death from gout in 1434.

== Legend ==
Enrique de Villena had various talents and interests, many of which are exemplified in his writing. His writing on etiquette was informed by service at the court of Castile under his cousin Henry III and nephew John II. Although a Treatise on Astrology is wrongly attributed to Villena, he studied medicine and wrote on leprosy, psychology, and complaints of the evil eye. It is said that he devoted much of his time to the studies of alchemy, astrology, philosophy and mathematics. This led to his widespread reputation as a necromancer. Like Roger Bacon and other figures, he was reputed to have constructed a brazen head able to answer his questions. Upon Villena's death in 1434, the king ordered Bishop Lope de Barrientos to investigate his library. Barrientos had many of Villena's books burned, strengthening the public's assumption that he was involved in witchcraft. A few of the remaining books went to the poet Santillana, while the rest of them went to the king.

== Works ==
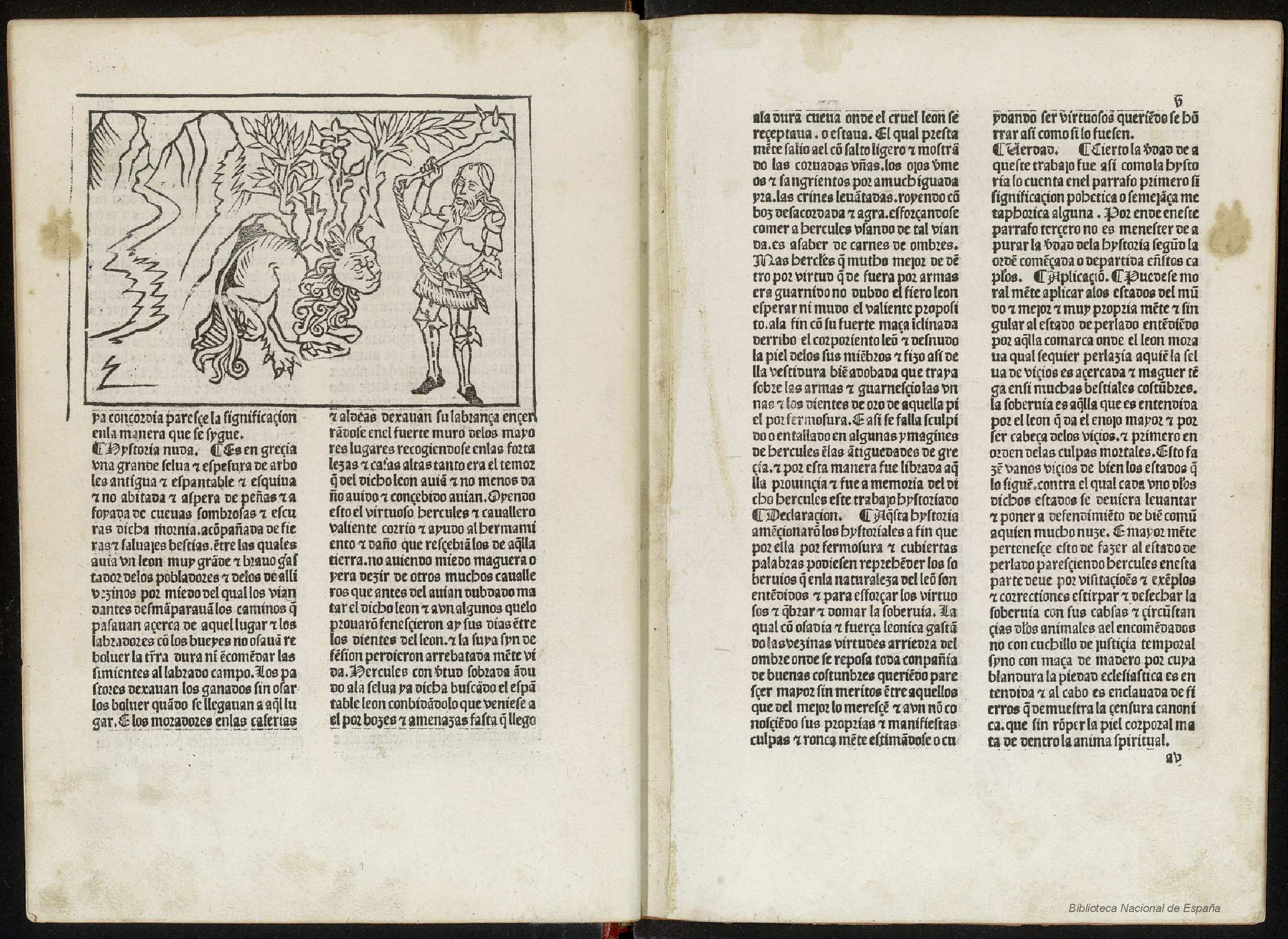
1483 edition of Los doce Trabajos de Hércules

Don Enrique de Villena's literary achievements are quite diverse. Perhaps Villena's most successful work among Spanish readers was his interpretation of Los doce Trabajos de Hércules (The Twelve Works of Hercules). Twelve Works draws on Greek mythology for its subject matter and Christian literary traditions for its allegorical significance, a synthesis that Villena makes throughout the work. Written in Catalan and then adapted into Castilian, the work contains obvious and didactic moral messages which Villena found applicable and important within the framework of contemporary Spain. Twelve Works is divided into twelve chapters, and each of those into four parts. Villena justifies his adaptation of foreign myth through the common idea that good fiction is able to both delight the reader and, through that delight, lead the reader to virtuous action. Written in 1417, Twelve Works of Hercules made Villena's literary reputation, perhaps because it lacks the erudition and theoretical complexity of the later treatises.

Villena's Arte de Trovar is valued least for its literary merit. Described as "frustrating and sterile" (85), Arte de Trovar is a treatise on the rules and proper prosody of troubadour poetry. The work, like Villena's other treatises, is erudite and difficult, concerning itself with complex laws of meter and versification, which were laid down as a result of lesser poets violating the structures of the "gay science" of Troubadour poetry. These poetic structures were viewed by Villena as a "true and immutable order of things", and the genius of the poet was to make his words or stories conform to the laws of this order. Arte de Trovar attests to the important cultural exchange between Catalonia and the Provençal region of southern France (the home of troubadour lyric poetry), and conveys a sense of nostalgia on Villena's part for the chivalric and highly decorous world of troubadour subject matter. Arte de Trovar was completed between 1417 and 1428.

Also of importance are Villena's translations of Virgil's The Aeneid and Dante's Divine Comedy into Castilian. Villena was the first translator and one of the first to translate in prose, respectively, Dante's poem into another vernacular language and Virgil's epic poem into a Romance language (1427–28), and was faced with the difficulty of maintaining the subtlety and depth of The Aeneid while appealing to a largely unlearned audience that was used to easily decipherable allegorical stories. Along with an initial section of "advice for the beginning reader", the text comments as to how the examples of the ancient text may still be practically applied to contemporary Castilian society. Along with his interest in Virgil, Villena's translation of Dante's Divine Comedy reflects, perhaps, a shifting interest from the courtly poets discussed in Arte de Trovar to a divinely inspired Christian poet based on Roman models. Villena also translated Petrarch's sonnets. These translations of classical literature were widely read by a growing community of literary nobility, a social circle in which Villena was among the most important members.

In Arte Cisoria or Arte de Cisoria ("On the Art of Carving"), Villena meticulously describes the tools used, the steps taken, and the rules of etiquette to be employed while table carving. His knowledge came from personal observation and experience working at the court of Castile. Villena's comprehension of 15th century medicine is seen in his work Tratado de la Fascinación o de Aojamiento ("Treatise on the Evil Eye"). In addition to describing the origin of the evil eye, he offers traditional and "present" methods for the prevention, diagnosis and cure of the illness. Further medical knowledge and research is seen in his work Tratado de la Lepra ("Treatise on Leprosy"). In Villena's Tratado de la Consolación ("Treatise on Consolation"), we see his understanding of psychology.

== Astrology ==
Villena's esoteric works include his Treatise on Astrology (1438) and Treatise on the Evil Eye (1425). In the first, Villena appropriated biblical discourse, citing several passages of Peter Comestor's paraphrased bible Historia Scholastica which acquiesce in astrology and magic. Magic is for Villena the sum of all sciences. In his Treatise, he defends magical and astrological representations of Jewish cult objects like the Tabernacle and the Temple. He represents Moses as an astrologer and practitioner of talismanic magic, and argues that Zoroaster was his teacher, and the founder of magic. This notion would be formulated at length by Marsilio Ficino at the end of the 15th century under the label of Prisca Theologia. In addition, in his Treatise on the Evil Eye Villena defended Jewish cabalistic practices to cure the evil eye, preceding several years the interest of Giovanni Pico della Mirandola in kabbala during the Italian Renaissance.

== Legacy ==
Villena's deep interest in science and his great knowledge of astrology and other religious mystical systems gave him the reputation of a necromancer during his lifetime. This brought some of his works into question. Despite this, modern critics now see Villena as one of the most important Castilian intellectual leaders of the 15th century.

Villena exemplified characteristics of vernacular humanism in his translations and adaptations of the classical works. He encouraged Italian humanist thought and took some of the first steps to incorporate Latin culture and intellect into the culture of Castile. This started a movement to convert classical works into modern vernacular languages so that they could be read and enjoyed by more than just Latin scholars.

Villena was a strong believer in poetry's necessary role in creating the intellectual elite. This is shown in the way he seeks to instruct his readers on various aspects of morality in his texts. He tries to influence the Castilian court and aristocracy on virtue and etiquette.

His most significant classical translation, Virgil's Aeneid, was among the first complete translations of this work into a romance language. It was completed in 1428. He translates the work and provides commentary that enables readers to grasp the obscurity of the text and gives literal interpretations of specific information in order to teach the Castilian society the proper behaviors of courtiers. Typical of vernacular humanism, Villena's commentary and ad sensum translation of the Aeneid exhibits Villena's feeling that reading and intellectual curiosity are important in the education of the elite.

The accusations of necromancy and the heavy influence Italian Humanism had on his writing made him a bit controversial. The controversy surrounding Villena's personal character spread his popularity by the interest it sparked in authors who followed. Villena often appears as a character in literature. In El doncel de don Enrique el Doliente, Mariano José de Larra portrays Villena as an evil figure. Lope de Vega's Porfiar hasta morir illustrates Villena as more of a hero figure who works for justice. There is not one portrayal of Villena's personal character accurate enough to give us a complete understanding of what he was really like. His literary accomplishments have survived time, but the uncertainty surrounding his life still remains a mystery. However, he is viewed as an intellectual pioneer who exhibited civic virtue and wrote with poetic eloquence.

Preceded by Gonzalo Núñez de Guzmán	Grand Master of the Order of Calatrava; 1404–1407	Succeeded by Luis González de Guzmán

== Bibliography ==
- Boase, Roger (1977). The Origin and Meaning of Courtly Love: A Critical Study of European Scholarship. Manchester: Manchester University Press. ISBN 0-87471-950-X.
- "Enrique de Villena," in Dictionary of Literary Biography, Volume 286: Castilian Writers, 1400-1500. Edited by Frank A. Domínguez and George D. Greenia. Gale, 2004, pp. 266–276.
- Arte de trovar. Edición, prólogo y notas de F.J. Sánchez Cantón; prospecto de Antonio Prieto. Madrid: Visor Libros, 1993.
- King Arjona, Doris. "Enrique de Villena and the Arte Cisoria" Hispania 43 (1960): 209-213.
- Riquer, Martí de (1964). Història de la Literatura Catalana, vol. 1. Barcelona: Edicions Ariel.
- Thoms, William John, ed. (1828), The History of Friar Bacon: containing the Wonderful Things that He did in his Life: also the Manner of his Death; with the Lives and Deaths of the two Conjurers, Bungye and Vandermast, London: William Pickering.
- Torres-Alcalá, Antonio. Don Enrique de Villena: un mago al dintel del Renacimiento. Madrid: Porrúa, 1983.
- Villalba, Mariano (2018) "Enrique de Villena", in Astrology through History. Interpreting the Stars from Ancient Mesopotamia to the Present. William E. Burns (Ed.). Santa Barbara: ABC-CLIO, pp. 342–343. 978-1-4408-5142-1
- Villalba, Mariano (2016) "Cábala y aojamiento en el Tratado de la Fascinación de Enrique de Villena", Melancolia, Vol Nº1, pp. 30–50. ISSN 2526-1096
- Villalba, Mariano (2015) "El Tratado de Astrología atribuido a Enrique de Villena. Esoterismo en la corte de Juan II de Castilla", Magallánica: revista de historia moderna, Vol 2, Nº3, pp. 186–216. ISSN 2422-779X
