= Flag of Buenos Aires =

Buenos Aires
- Use: Civil and state flag
- Proportion: 9:14
- Adopted: October 24, 1995; 31 years ago
- Design: A black crowned eagle holding a Calatrava cross with its left foot with four young eagles at its feet
- Designed by: Juan de Garay

The flag of Buenos Aires is the official flag used by the different areas and dependencies of the Government of the city of Buenos Aires, Argentina, adopted on October 24, 1995.

== Symbolism ==
The flag contains the city's first coat of arms on a white field. This is a completely different coat of arms than the one adopted in 2012. The eagle represents Spanish colonization, the Calatrava cross, used by the military Order of Calatrava, represents evangelism, the crown represents monarchy and the four eaglets represent four cities that were founded in that period: Santa Fe, La Trinidad (Buenos Aires), Corrientes and Concepción del Bermejo.

== Protocol ==
The proportions of the flag were established in Article 2, which established the proportions of 9:14, with the shield placed in the center. The flag must always be flown together with the national flag, the flag must be in all local government offices.

== History ==
Flag used during the visit of the Juan Carlos I in 1978.

The earliest mention of the coat of arms dates back to 20 October 1580, when Juan de Garay, the founder of the city, decreed the recognition of Saint Martin of Tours as the city's patron saint and introduced the coat of arms. The coat of arms designed by de Garay is Argent (white) shield with a sable (black) essorant (rousant) eagle facing left (Note: "In heraldry, directions are determined from the viewpoint of the person holding the shield from behind. Some believe Juan de Garay made an error, as animals in heraldry typically face to the right. However, cases where an animal's head is turned to look backward follow heraldic conventions and are described as "regardant".). In its raised right leg, the eagle holds the gules (red) cross of Calatrava. There are four chicks next to the eagle. The eagle has four chicks at its legs and a crown.

The coat of arms devised by de Garay was used in a very limited way and was quickly forgotten. Jacinto de Lariz, Governor of Rio da Prata, approved a new coat of arms on 5 November 1649, immediately introducing it into temporary use, but which was not sent for royal approval and therefore remained technically unofficial until 1856. This coat of arms depicts a dove above the water with an anchor sticking out of it, and over time two sailing ships also appeared on it.

In 1978, Mayor Osvaldo Cacciatore took care of changing the local shield, restoring the original coat of arms with the eagle, but changing the color black to yellow. Cacciatore also created the prototype of the later city flag. Since it was a personal decision of the mayor that was never sanctioned, these flags and the modified coat of arms themselves did not become official symbols and were only used during the visit of the King of Spain in 1978.

On 28 September 1995, the City council of Buenos Aires passed ordenance 49.669, which established the city flag. The ordenance came into effect with decree 1.291 on October 24, 1995. The first article states that the official city flag features a white field with the shield designed in 1580 by Juan de Garay in its center.

== Unofficial flag of La Boca ==
Unofficial flag of La Boca

Flag based on the flag of Genoa is also frequently used in La Boca due to its Ligurian heritage.

Cultural institutions in the La Boca neighborhood sometimes use the so-called "Republic of La Boca" flags. This is the national flag of Argentina, with the Sun of May replaced by the Italian coat of arms and Phrygian cap. The origins of the flag date back to an urban legend according to which in the second half of the 19th century, a district inhabited by Italian immigrants declared independence. Since 1907, the "Republic of La Boca" has been re-declared several times as a micronation.

== See also ==
- Coat of arms of Buenos Aires
- Flag of Buenos Aires Province
- Flag of Prussia
- List of Argentine flags
