= Ciruelos (disambiguation) =

Ciruelos (plum tree in Spanish language) may refer to:

- Ciruelos, a Chilean village in the commune of Pichilemu;
- Ciruelos, a settlement in the Dominican Republic;
- Ciruelos, a town in the Spanish province of Segovia;
- Ciruelos, a location in the Spanish province of Toledo;
- Ciruelos River, in the province of Burgos, Spain
