= Juan Núñez de Prado =

Juan Núñez de Prado may refer to:

- Juan Núñez de Prado (conquistador), 16th-century Spanish conquistador known for his conquest of Tucumán Province
- Juan Núñez de Prado (Grand Master of Calatrava) (died 1355), Castilian nobleman who became Master of the Order of Calatrava
