= Armando Renganeschi =

Argentine footballer and manager

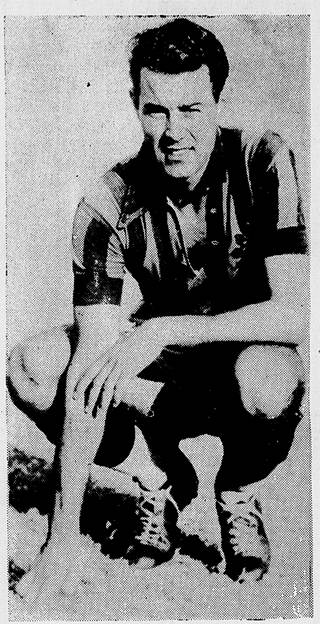

Personal information
- Full name: Armando Federico Renganeschi
- Date of birth: 10 May 1913
- Place of birth: Capitán Sarmiento, Buenos Aires, Argentina
- Date of death: 12 October 1983 (aged 70)
- Place of death: Campinas, Brazil
- Position: Centre back

Youth career
- 1927–1932: Central Norte

Senior career*
Years	Team	Apps	(Gls)
1933–1940	Independiente		
1938	→ Estudiantes (loan)		
1938	→ Almagro (loan)		
1939	→ Talleres (loan)		
1940	→ Bonsucesso (loan)		
1941–1944	Fluminense		
1944–1948	São Paulo		
1949	Jabaquara		

Managerial career
- 1954: Ferroviária
- 1958: São Paulo
- 1961: Palmeiras
- 1964: Guarani
- 1965: Ferroviária
- 1965–1967: Flamengo
- 1968: Portuguesa Santista
- 1969–1971: Guarani
- 1974–1975: Coritiba
- 1976: Colorado
- 1976: Ponte Preta
- 1977–1978: Londrina
- 1978: Corinthians
- 1979: Bahia
- * Club domestic league appearances and goals

Armando Federico Renganeschi, or simply Renganeschi (10 May 1913 in Capitán Sarmiento, Buenos Aires – 12 October 1983 in Campinas) was an Argentine football centre back.

Renganeschi was also the manager of Brazilian club Guarani Futebol Clube during the 1971 Campeonato Paulista.
