= Don Garcia =

Don Garcia may refer to:

- Don Garcia (skier)
- Don Garcia (union organizer)
- Don García, first grand master of the Order of Calatrava
