= Garci López de Padilla =

- Grand Master of the Order of Calatrava
- Cross of the Order of Calatrava.
- Noble family: House of Padilla

Garci López de Padilla was a Spanish noble of the House of Padilla. He was the fifteenth Grand Master of the Order of Calatrava from 1296 to 1322. He is best known for his command of the Castilian forces at the Siege of Gibraltar and his participation in the greater campaign against the Kingdom of Granada undertaken by Ferdinand IV of Castile in 1309.

The Siege of Gibraltar became one of the only successful achievements in the entire campaign undertaken by Ferdinand IV as the other main objective of taking the city of Algeciras turned into a quagmire and the king was obliged to lift the siege.

== See also ==
- Order of Calatrava
- Siege of Gibraltar (1309)
- Siege of Algeciras (1309)
- Grand Masters of the Order of Calatrava

Preceded by Diego López de Santsoles	Grand Master of the Order of Calatrava; 1296–1322	Succeeded by Juan Núñez de Prado
