= Jaume Roig =

Spanish doctor and author

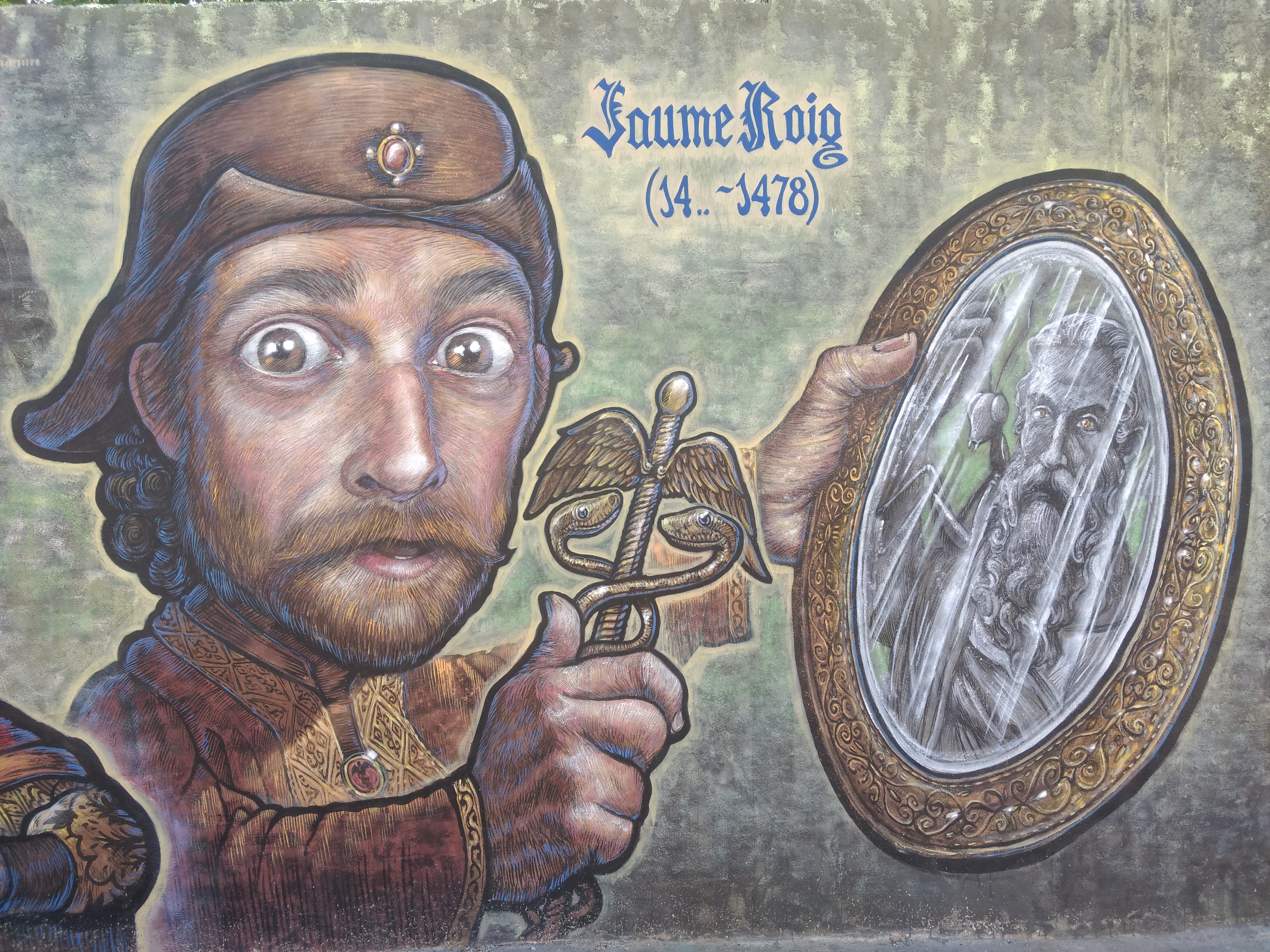
urals Toni Espinar a Muro 2018

Jaume Roig (early 15th century, València - April 1478, Benimàmet) was a doctor in the city of València and the author of Espill (Mirror), a work of medieval literature in the Valencian/Catalan language. Together with Ausiàs March, and Isabel de Villena, Jaume Roig is one of the three writers chosen by Henry W. Longfellow to summarise the literature of the 15th century in the Catalan language.

== Family ==
Jaume Roig's family was of Catalan origins from the city of València. His great-grandfather moved to València from Mataró and became a jurat, a member of the local government.

His grandfather was a notary and also involved in politics and medicine. Jaume Roig's father, also called Jaume Roig and often referred to as Jaume Roig lo vell (the old one), was a member of the local council and a doctor's examiner.

Jaume Roig "lo jove" (the young one) was born in València in the early 15th century. He was a Mestre in Medicine. and he probably studied at the University of Lleida, created around 1300 by the King James II, and the University of Paris.

His family's position and reputation allowed him to work as the doctor of the Royal Family, the local government and the church. He was also the doctors' Academic Examiner for over a decade.

By 1441 Jaume Roig had married Isabel Pellicer. They had six children, all of which lived longer than Jaume Roig and three of whom joined the clergy.

== Work ==
The Espill is addressed to the fictitious nephew of the narrator and tries to convince him of the evil nature of women and how it is better to avoid their company by all means. To do so, the narrator provides examples of mundane women trying to harm male pilgrims, and particularly his own (fictional) experiences after several marriages. Some scholars believe the misogyny of the narrator should not be assumed to represent the views of the author.

It is a novel written in poetic form with a very short meter that has also attracted the interests of historians trying to get an insight of society, gender, and sexuality at the time.

== In popular culture ==
The singer Raimon turned a piece from Espill into music. This particular passage narrates the story of a Hostel in Paris where the guests are fed human flesh.
