= Flag of Buenos Aires Province =

Buenos Aires Province
- Use: Civil and state flag
- Proportion: 9:14
- Adopted: August 12, 1997; 29 years ago
- Design: A horizontal bicolour of blue and green separated by a thin red line, which is interrupted by the outline of half a blue gear on the green field. At the centre there is half a sun and half a sunflower with a red semi-circle. The sun is surrounded by green laurels
- Designed by: Various students from the Matheu Gelicich and Faustino Sarmiento elementary schools, Capitán Sarmiento Partido

The flag of Buenos Aires Province, Argentina, was created by students and officially adopted by Provincial Law 11.997 on August 12, 1997, after being chosen among other designs by vote of the educative community in which 270,000 students aged 12–18 took part in over 2 years, supported by specialists and parents. There were 81,525 proposals, 32 of which were selected from all 16 regions along 1995–96. 4 of the final 32 were selected by a jury to be voted on by 2 million students on 12 August 1997. The flag was designed by the boys of Schools Matheu Gelicich and Faustino Sarmiento (both located in Capitán Sarmiento), chosen by 1,500,000 voters, garnering over half the vote.

== Symbolism ==
The colour green represents the province's fields; the blue refers to its rivers, the sea at its coasts and the sky over it. The red hemisphere symbolizes federalism. The yellow stands for production's fecundity. The laurel leaves represent the province's glory. The cog wheel stands for industrial production, while the half sunflower stands for agricultural output.

== History ==
=== Argentine Confederation ===
Flag of Buenos Aires Province in 1848

Flag flying over Fuerte de Buenos Aires (1841-1852)

The first flag symbolizing the province was created around 1848, when it was part of the Argentine Confederation. The Confederation had no central government, and the governor of Buenos Aires was responsible for conducting foreign policy, at that time this office was held by federalist Juan Manuel de Rosas. The flag was used to represent the entire confederation. The flag was created on the basic pattern of the flag of Argentina, but the blue color was made darker as the light blue in Argentina's national flag was considered at the time to be a symbol of the Unitarian Party. In the Rosas' design, the red hats, the dark blue background, and the red sun all symbolize federalism. The sun's original yellow color was also darkened over time until it became also red. During the Rosas period, a Confederate flag without the white stripe was also used. This design was originally used on warships during the campaigns of 1841-1845, but was flown at Fuerte de Buenos Aires between 1841 and 3 February 1852.

=== State of Buenos Aires ===
Flag of the State of Buenos Aires (1852-1861)

Buenos Aires naval ensign (1852-1861)

Buenos Aires merchant flag (1852-1861)

On 11 September 1852, the Unitarian Party carried out a bloodless coup in the province, which led to the creation of the State of Buenos Aires. The state effectively controlled only the coast of La Plata. Although Buenos Aires was then an independent state, with its own diplomatic relations, it tried to reintegrate with Argentina. The State of Buenos Aires used a flag consisting of two light blue stripes and a white one in the middle, where the Greater Coat of Arms of Argentina was located. It was replaced by the national flag with the unification of the country in 1861. Since then, no provincial flag has been used in Buenos Aires until the adoption of the current design. Buenos Aires warships continued to use the naval ensign previously used by the Unitary Party. This was the original light blue Argentine flag with an additional thin white stripe at the top.

=== History of the current flag ===
Proposed flag of Buenos Aires Province (1991)

In 1991, the then provincial governor Antonio Cafiero came up with a flag identical to the national flag, except that the May sun was replaced by a golden cogwheel, flanked by ears of wheat, symbolizing industry and agriculture respectively. This flag was never adopted. In 1995, a competition was announced in which children were to design a provincial flag. A selection was made from all the works presented, resulting in 32 designs that went to the final selection of four possible flags, chosen by the students.

== See also ==
- Flag of Buenos Aires
- Coat of arms of Buenos Aires Province
