= Isabel de Villena =

- Born: Elionor Manuel de Villena c.1430 Kingdom of Valencia, Crown of Aragon
- Died: 1490 (aged 59–60); Kingdom of Valencia, Crown of Aragon
- Occupations: Writer & religious sister
- Relatives: Enrique de Villena (father)

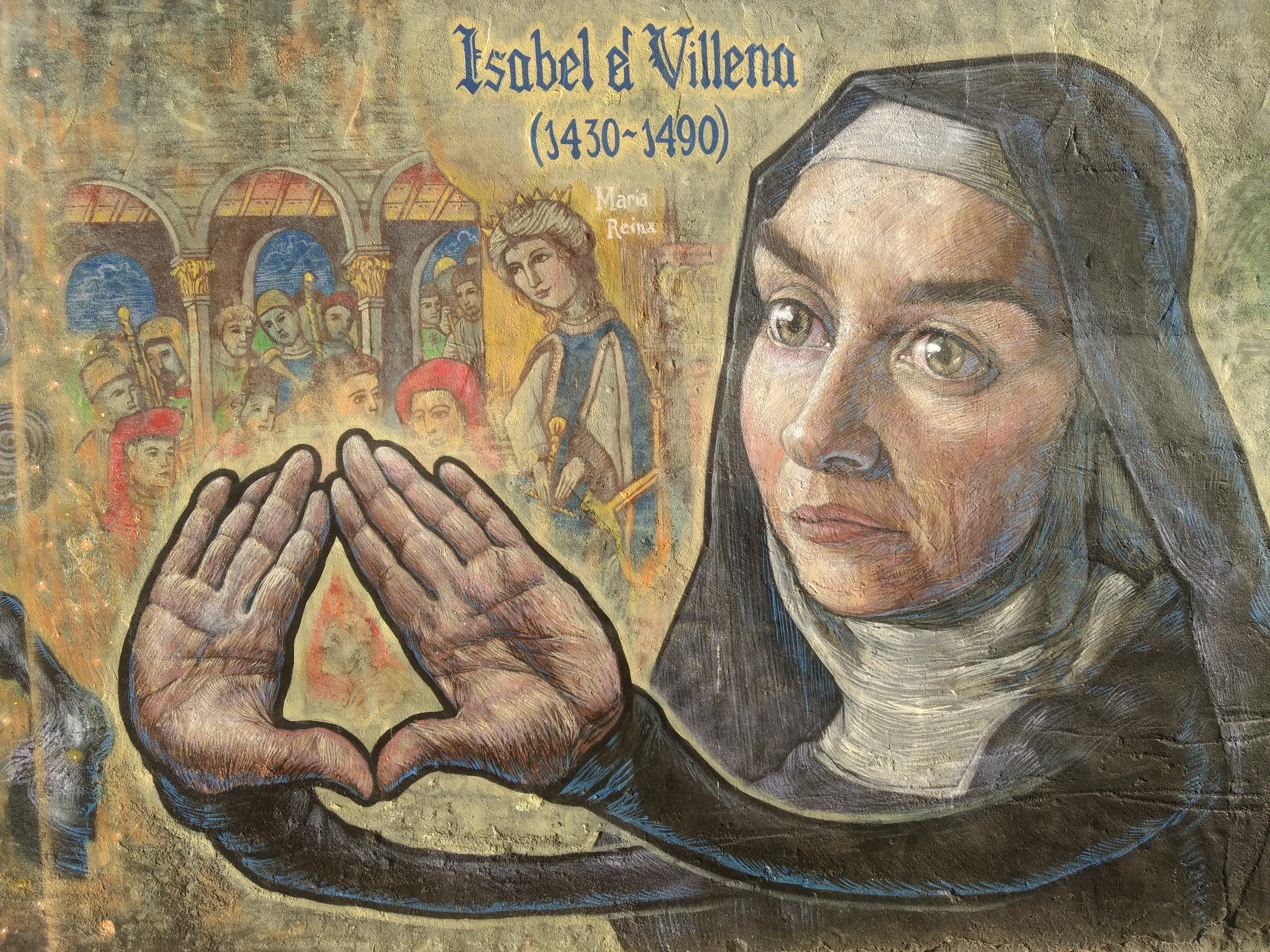
Espinar Murals 2018 - Batà, Muro

Isabel de Villena (c.1430-Valencia, Crown of Aragon, 1490) was the illegitimate child of Enrique de Villena by an unknown noblewoman who rose to become the abbess of the Real Monasterio de la Trinidad of Valencia. As the first major female writer of a work done in the Catalan language, she composed a number of religious treaties. Her most famous work was her Vita Christi (Christ's Life). She was also a proto-feminist who tried to change the negative image of women at the time through her writing.

== Life ==
Born Elionor de Villena in 1430 Isabel was the illegitimate child of Enrique de Villena, an aristocrat and writer who was related to the royal line of Castile and Aragon, and an unknown noblewoman. She was raised by Queen Maria of Castile of Valencia from the time she was four. She lived in the court of Alfonso V of Aragon (the Magnanimous) and was educated there until 1445 when she became a nun in the Monastery of la Trinidad. She was fifteen years old. This monastery, La Trinitat, was founded by Queen Maria de Luna, who was also the chief benefactor. Isabel was elected abbess of the convent in 1462 and took charge in 1463. According to Rosanna Cantavella, a scholar who has extensively studied Sor Isabel, there was a rumor that there had to be divine intervention from the Archangel Michael that allowed Isabel to be elected as abbess, simply because it would have been very difficult for her to be elected on her own because she was an illegitimate child. Illegitimate children were not usually eligible for such positions, but Isabel was elected anyway.

Sor Isabel was a capable abbess who carried out economic policies in order to improve the convent she presided over. Sor Isabel dedicated her entire life to the convent and to her writing before dying in 1490 at the age of 60. It is believed that she died during an outbreak of plague.

== Writing ==
Sor Isabel had a career not only as an abbess but also as a writer. Her most popular work is her Vita Christi. Widely considered to be a response to the misogynistic book Spill o Llibre de les dones (“The Mirror or Book of Women”) by Jaume Roig in 1459, Vita Christi embodied the feminist beliefs held by Sor Isabel. Jaume Roig was the physician to both Queen Maria and La Trinitat. He and Isabel likely knew each other. Sor Isabel's book was likely her expression of her dissatisfaction toward the image of women that her male contemporaries created and encouraged in their work.

Vita Christi, translated as “Christ’s Life,” was a work of devotional literature focusing primarily on drawing readers to identify with Christ's experiences and suffering. This kind of literature was popular from the thirteenth through the sixteenth centuries in Western Europe. While they were primarily written in Latin, there were also a number that were circulated in the vernacular—the local language—which was the option that Isabel decided to use. She wrote in Valencian and Catalan. Sor Isabel decided to write a version of Christ's life in the vernacular for the nuns of her convent. It was published after her death in 1490 and was printed in 1497 by her niece, Queen Isabella I of Castile.

The part of Isabel de Villena's Vita Christi that differs the most from other Vitae Christi written around the same time was that it focused equally—if not more—on the women in Christ's life, including his mother Mary and Mary Magdalene. Vita Christi opens with the Nativity of Mary and ends with her Assumption. The Visitation of the angels to the Virgin Mary and her sister Elizabeth is extended in Isabel's work, which sets it apart from other male authors who wrote works on Christ's life. Mary also has conversations with allegorical representations of Diligence and Charity, echoing the popular philosophical rhetoric of authors such as Boethius in his Consolation of Philosophy. Jesus is only the focus for about 4,000 lines out of 37,500, where the actions of the women around him, primarily his mother Mary, fill many more. Isabel places the female characters in more important positions than she does Christ himself.

Lesley K. Twomey, another scholar who has extensively studied Isabel de Villena, notes how, unlike other female authors of the time, Sor Isabel did not humble herself or reference her unworthiness. Rather, her tone was more authoritative and confident. This is another sign of the feminist ideals Sor Isabel held and expressed in her writing. Unlike the male writers in her time, she regarded women very highly. As Montserrat Piera, yet another scholar on Sor Isabel notes, this belief was expressed in Sor Isabel's writing through the vindication of the generally vilified female characters Eve and Mary Magdalene, as well as through the character of Jesus himself. This is seen by scholars as a direct response to Jaume Roig's writing through the mouthpiece of Jesus Christ.

== Modern Interest ==
Isabel de Villena's writing was relatively obscure until recently, primarily because of the language in which it was written and her gender. Sor Isabel wrote in Valencian, which was not studied as much by Hispanic scholars in earlier years. However, due to the increase in feminist studies, her work has been rediscovered and studied much more. Now, her most famous work, Vita Christi, is being considered one of the most remarkable early feminist writings. She has been compared to another proto-feminist writer of the early modern period, Christine de Pizan. By examining women writers such as Isabel de Villena and Christine de Pizan, scholars have come to the conclusion that writing was a way for women to break the silence imposed upon them by men, even though it was discouraged greatly.

More research is currently being done on Sor Isabel's other writings, which have not all lasted through the past six centuries.
