= Capitán Sarmiento, Buenos Aires =

Capitán Sarmiento
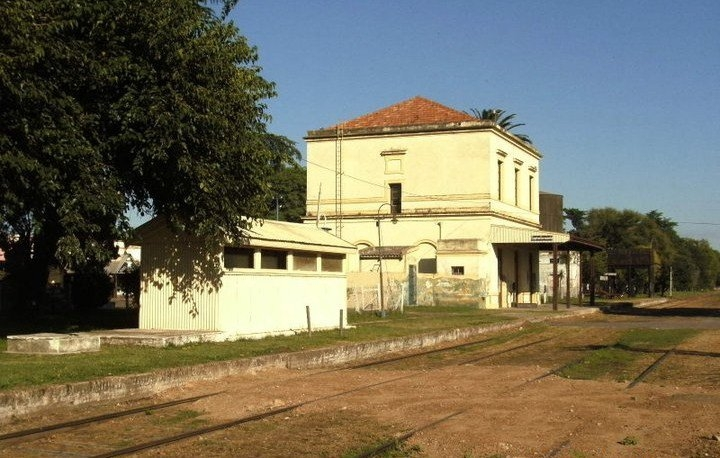
- Capitán Sarmiento railway station

- Location in Argentina
- Coordinates: 34°10′S 59°47′W
- Country: Argentina
- Province: Buenos Aires
- Partido: Capitán Sarmiento
- Founded: 21 December 1961
- Elevation: 54 m (177 ft)

Population (2001 census [INDEC])
  - Total: 11,316
- CPA Base: B B2752
- Area code: +54 2478

Capitán Sarmiento is a town in Buenos Aires Province, Argentina. It is the head town of the Capitán Sarmiento Partido.

== History ==
The town and partido were established by provincial law on 21 December 1961. It was named after Domingo Fidel Sarmiento, adopted son of former President Domingo Faustino Sarmiento.

The town became widely known in 1995, when a province-wide vote to select a new flag for Buenos Aires Province elected a design made by schoolboys from two schools in Capitán Sarmiento. Governor Eduardo Duhalde later issued a decree declaring the town "Cradle of the flag of Buenos Aires", and in 2011 a monument was erected in the town to commemorate its status as such.
