= Calatrava cross =

Style of Greek cross

The Calatrava Cross, or the Cross of Calatrava, is a type of cross notably used by the Order of Calatrava in red (gules), the Order of Montesa in black (sable), the Order of Alcántara in green (vert) and by the Order of Preachers in black (sable) and white (argent).

Calatrava cross variants

The cross consists of a Greek cross with four equally-sized arms, with each arm ending with a fleur-de-lis.

The cross can be seen on numerous coats of arms and flags, notably the flag of Buenos Aires, along with multiple towns in the Campo de Calatrava region of Spain. It can also be found in Cantabrian mansions, the coats of arms of some families, and as a representative symbol of the Dominican community.^{[es]}

Flag of Buenos Aires, depicting a black eagle holding a Calatrava cross with its left foot

In the Order of Calatrava, the cross was commonly depicted as black, before it was changed to red in the 15th century.^{[es]}
