= Juan Núñez de Prado (grand master of Calatrava) =

Portuguese nobleman (??–1355)

- Died: 1355; Maqueda
- Occupation: Nobleman
- Known for: Master of the Order of Calatrava

Juan Núñez de Prado (Portuguese: João Nunes de Prado; died 1355), illegitimate son of Infanta Blanche of Portugal and a Portuguese nobleman named Pedro Nunes Carpinteyro, was a nobleman in the 14th century who became Master of the Order of Calatrava in 1325 after leading a revolt against the former Master. There was a prolonged dispute before his position was recognized. After he fell out of favor with King Peter of Castile he was removed from office and murdered.

== Early years ==
Juan Núñez de Prado was a knight of the Order of Calatrava. He and other knights rose against the Master Garci López de Padilla, who was discredited because of his failure in his fight against the Taifa of Jaén, and his poor performance in an expedition against the Muslims of the Emirate of Granada, where he was supposed to have fled from the battlefield. The rebellious knights made Villareal, the future Ciudad Real, their stronghold, since some of them were from that town. They defeated the Master Garci López de Padilla at the Battle of Malas Tardes.

In 1325 Alfonso XI of Castile granted the wishes of the rebel knights and friars, who came to the court at Valladolid to indict the master on four counts. The first was dereliction of the strongholds that the master Garci had left without supplies and that had been lost, including those of Alcaudete, Locubín, Susaña, Chist and Mathet. The second was that having fled the fighting during the battle of Baena he had left the friars who accompanied him. The third was the authoritarianism and cruelty of the master in his treatment of his friars. Fourth was his attacks on places and vassals of the Crown, particularly in Villarreal. The master was summoned to the royal court, but fled to Alcañiz, headquarters of the Aragonese dominions of the Order of Calatrava.

== Master of Calatrava ==
Since Garci López de Padilla had taken flight, Alfonso XI ordered the friars opposing him to organize an irregular chapter that elected Juan Núñez de Prado as the new master. The schism was prolonged, as the deposed master tried to assert his rights before the general chapter of the Cistercians. That order, through the Abbots of Monsalud and of Morimond, recognized the legitimacy of his position and restored to him in possession of the mastership. But, with the backing of the Castilian king and most of the knights of the order for Juan Núñez de Prado, who held the Calatrava villas and castles, García López de Padilla resigned from the mastership in 1329 in exchange for continuing to have the service of ten knights and lifetime enjoyment of a few villas and castles held by the order in the kingdoms of Aragon and Valencia, with their income, and the Zorita and El Collado sections.

However, Juan Núñez de Prado broke some of the terms of the agreement. Don Garcia returned to claim his rights with support from the Aragonese monarchy, and continued to claim the mastership of Calatrava until his death in 1336. This circumstance, and the continued support of the Crown of Aragon extended the schism until an agreement was reached in August 1348 before the Cortes in Zaragoza in exchange for granting greater rights and greater autonomy to the Aragonese sections of the order.

== Deposition and death ==
During the reign of Peter of Castile (r. 1350–1369), the son and successor of Alfonso XI, Juan Núñez de Prado opposed the king's policies. He was forced to take refuge in the fortress of Calatrava la Nueva, and then fled to Alcañiz. In 1355 he returned to the Master's residence at Almagro, Ciudad Real. Peter of Castile ordered Juan de la Cerda to arrest him there. The master did not resist, although he had enough men to put up a fight. He was replaced as Master by Diego García de Padilla, brother of the king's mistress, María de Padilla. The new master sent Juan Nunez to Maqueda Castle, where he was murdered by the squire Diego López de Porras. Meanwhile, the nephew of Núñez de Prado, Pedro Estébanez Carpinteyro, proclaimed himself Master in the Sevillian city of Osuna.
