= Monastery of Fitero =

Monastery in Fitero, Spain

Coordinates: 42°03′22″N 1°51′30″W

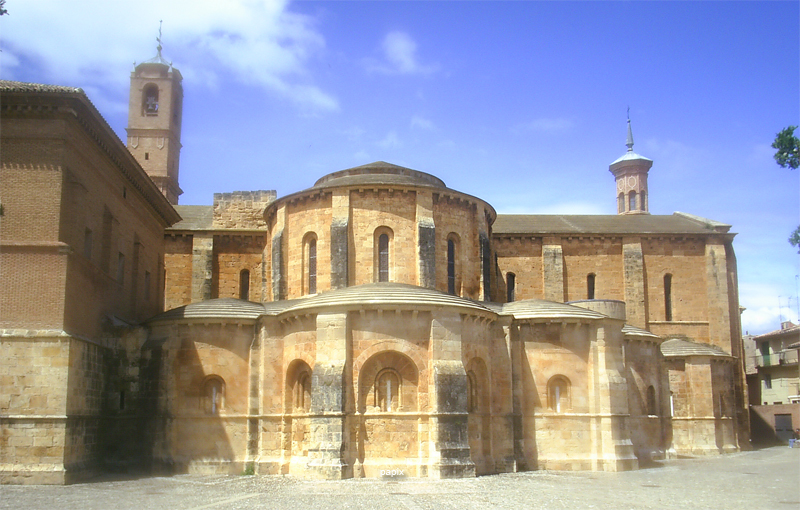
Monastery of Fitero

The Monastery of Fitero (Spanish: Monasterio de Santa María la Real or Monasterio de Santa María de Nienzebas) is a Cistercian monastery located at Fitero, Navarre, Spain, on the banks of the Alhama river.

== History ==
On October 25, 1140, Alfonso VII of León and Castile gifted the Santa Maria de Yerga Church land for the purpose of building a monastery. By 1141 a small monastery had been established under the abbacy of Abbot Raimundo de Fitero. Furthermore, by 1141 a monastery had been built in a location called Niencebas. Unequivocal evidence from documents within the Order of Cistercians states that in 1147 Abbot Raimundo officially affiliated the monastery with the Order of Cistercians. Between 1147 and 1152 Abbot Raimundo transferred the monastery to its final and current location: Fitero.

In 1159 the bishop of Tarazona, Martin, attacked the monastery and expelled or killed all of the monks that were there. While it is uncertain how much time the monastery remained empty, a new Abbot was appointed in 1161. Abbot Guillermo was responsible for expanding the community around the monastery and for securing the monastery's property rights. Between 1161 and 1191 the monastery expanded in size and influence making it one of the most important monasteries in the region. Abbot Guillermo was substituted in 1182 by Abbot Marino. Abbot Marino took over in 1183 and led the monastery until 1187 when he was substituted by Abbot Pedro de Quesada.

Internal problems were recorded between 1189 and 1210 when the General Council of the Order of Cistercians levied several accusations against the abbots. In 1191 the council accused the abbot of working with an "agorero" (doomsayer), hiding debts among other charges. Similar charges appear to have been levied in subsequent years, but in 1197 a conspiracy was uncovered to remove the Prior of the monastery. At this point, the general council stepped in and re-established order. However appeasement of the monastery took time and an official abbot was not named until 1211 when Abbot Garcia was appointed. Construction of the church took place between the XII and XIII century, having been consecrated in 1247.

Since its foundation, the monastery of Fitero had been under jurisdiction of Castilla. However Fitero's location on the border with Navarra made it prone to be the center of border disputes. Throughout time, the monastery was enriched by kings from both Castilla and Navarra. However, in 1335 a war was fought to decide under whose jurisdiction the monastery would fall under. In 1336 Don Juan Martínez de Medrano 'El Mayor' participated in the arbitration of the conflict over the property of the monastery of Fitero maintained between Navarra and Castile. King Peter IV of Aragon supported Navarre and a new peace treaty with Castille was signed on 28 February 1336.The matter was not resolved until 1373 when it was concluded that the Monastery of Fitero had always belonged to Navarra.

As a result of the war and other problems, monastic life saw a significant moral and spiritual decline that went well into the XVI century. Members of the community accused members of the monastery of breaking their celibate pact, taking part in briberies, being a part of hunting excursions, among others. However, with the turn of the XVII century there was a spiritual and educational revival as the Cisterician Order made changes that required two monks from each monastery to attend university. As a result, the monastery gained new life between the XVII and XVIII centuries. Arguably in its glory days, a number of writers emerged from the Monastery of Fitero. The last perpetual Abbot was fray Plácido de Corral y Guzman whom died in 1643. From 1644 until 1835 Abbots held the position for a four-year term.

In 1809 the monks of the monastery were forced to abandon the monastery due to a government decree. They returned in 1814 only to be kicked out again in 1821. Finally in 1835, the monks were permanently removed from the monastery.

== Construction ==
There are no physical remains of the original monastery that was built and founded in 1140 at Niencebas. However it is known that the original structure was likely constructed predominantly of wood with some use of rocks. In accordance with Cistercian monastic structures, the monastery consisted of a church, dormitory, refectory, and a guest house. The monastery's territory, which includes a collection of buildings and surrounding crop fields, was physically separated from the rest of the land by a wooden fence. When the monastery was moved to Fitero, the monastery and supporting buildings, along with the crop fields were once again delineated by a wooden fence. However, by this time, the fence also began to serve as a form of defense. A short time after the relocation, the wooden fence was replaced by a wall made of brick, rock, and mortar However, this monastery was ultimately destroyed in 1159 when the bishop of Tarazona attacked and seized it.

Only the chapter house and the major parts of the church have been kept intact since their construction in the XII and XIII century. Projects of reconstruction, modernization, and expansion of the church were undertaken in order to meet the needs of the community. The first modification of the original church was the portico of the cloister. Over time it had deteriorated and was reconstructed in the XV century. During the first years of the XVI century that same portico was modified again to have a plateresque style. This work was done by Baltasar Febre whom died prior to finishing his work

Major restorations were not undertaken until the end of the XVI century and beginning of the XVIII century when a new cloister was erected. Around it, new buildings were also built due to the fact that old buildings that supported the monastery no longer served the needs of the community. These new edifices resulted in an operational shift within the monastery where the day-to-day operations of the monastery were now centered around the new cloister.

== The Abbey Church of Fitero ==
The church was the monastery's place of worship and main building. All other buildings, including the cloister were built in its surroundings. In accordance with other Cistercian monastic squares, the church would end up lying adjoined to the northern corridor. The first phase of the construction took place between 1179 and 1195. During this time, the sanctuary, transept, supporting buildings on the eastern corridor of the cloister, library, sacristy, and chapter house were built. Finally, between 1214 and 1247, construction of the abbey church was completed. The church's main design was heavily influenced by gothic architecture based on the inspirations imported from the French region of Burgundy. After the monks were kicked out in 1835 the church continued to offer religious services as a parish but under secular priests.

Its main fascade was built with a romanesque style with round arches.

The floor plan of the church is similar to that in the monasteries of Clairvaux and Pontigny, a Latin cross plan with three naves, the ambulatory sanctuary with five side chapels.
