= Siege of Algeciras (1309–1310) =

Battle of the Spanish Reconquista

- Part of the Reconquista
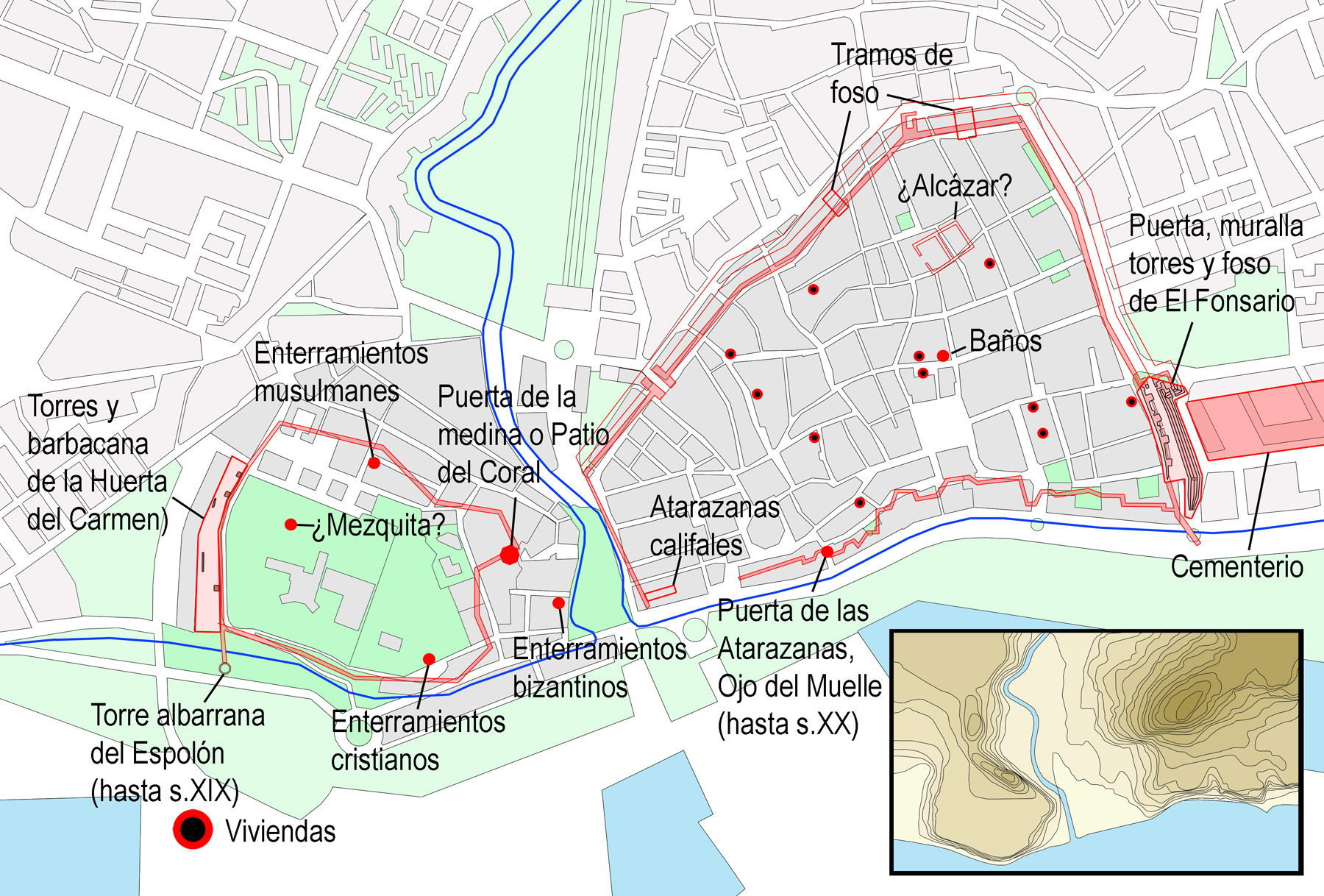
- A Medieval archaeological rendering of Algeciras.
| Date | July 1309 – January 1310 |
| Location | Algeciras, Emirate of Granada, Spain |
| Result | Granadan victory |

Belligerents
| Kingdom of Castile; Order of Santiago; Order of Calatrava | Emirate of Granada |

Commanders and leaders
| Ferdinand IV of Castile; Diego López V de Haro †; Juan Núñez II de Lara; Infante John of Castile; Alonso Pérez de Guzmán † | Muhammed III; Abu'l-Juyush Nasr |

The siege of Algeciras was a Spanish Reconquista battle between July 1309 and January 1310. The battle was fought between the forces of the Kingdom of Castile, commanded by King Ferdinand IV of Castile and his vassals, and the Emirate of Granada, commanded by Sultan Abu'l-Juyush Nasr. The battle resulted in a humiliating defeat for the Kingdom of Castile, whose army was obliged to lift the siege due to the atrocious conditions of life in the Castilian camp and the desertion of Infante John of Castile. The battle marked one of the many battles fought at Algeciras, where the Christian forces would try to take the city unsuccessfully from the Muslims.

== Context ==
On December 19, 1308, at Alcalá de Henares, King Ferdinand IV of Castile and the ambassadors from the Kingdom of Aragon, Bernaldo de Sarriá and Gonzalo García, agreed to the terms of the Treaty of Alcalá de Henares. Ferdinand IV, supported by his brother, Pedro de Castilla y Molina, the archbishop of Toledo, the bishop of Zamora, and Diego Lopez V de Haro, agreed to initiate a war against the Kingdom of Granada on June 24, 1309. It was agreed that the Aragonese monarch could not sign a separate peace accord with the Emir of Granada. A combined Aragonese-Castilian navy was also formed to support the siege in a blockade of the coastal Granadian towns. It was further agreed that the Kingdom of Castile would attack the towns of Algeciras and Gibraltar and that the Aragonese forces would conquer the city of Almería.

Ferdinand IV promised to cede one-sixth of the conquered Granadan territory to the Aragonese crown. He therefore chose the entirety of the Kingdom of Almeria as its limits fit the agreement except the towns of es:BedmarBedmar, Alcaudete, Quesada, Arenas, and Locubin which would stay with Castile, having all previously been part of the Kingdom of Castile and León before their Muslim takeovers. Ferdinand IV further stipulated that if the lands taken from the Kingdom of Almeria did not amount to one-sixth of Granadan territory, the archbishop of Toledo would step in to resolve any differences related to the matter. These concessions to the Kingdom of Aragon led a few of Ferdinand IV's vassals to protest the treaty's ratification, amongst them were John of Castile and Juan Manuel.

The concessions to Aragon, which had begun a period of relative irrelevancy compared to Castile, would make the kingdom once again very powerful on the Iberian Peninsula. Aragon had previously reached its height under the Treaty of Cazola and the Treaty of Almizra, which saw its territory and influence expand considerably. Ferdinand insisted on the Aragonese alliance to cement an alliance between Aragon and the king of Morocco, so they would not intervene in the coming war with Granada.

After signing the treaty at Alcala de Henares, Castile and Aragon sent emissaries to the court at Avignon to gain Pope Clement V's support and to obtain the clerical backing of an official Crusade to support military operations further. They also asked for the papal blessing of a marriage between the infanta Leonor de Castilla, the firstborn daughter of Ferdinand IV and Jaime de Aragón y Anjou, son and heir of James II of Aragon. The pope agreed to both ventures and on 24 April 1309, Clement V issuel the papal bull Indesinentis cure which authorized general crusade against Granada to conquer the Iberian Peninsula and mandates to conquer Corsica and Sardinia.

At the Courts of Madrid of 1309, the first courts ever occurring in the actual Spanish capital, Ferdinand IV publicly announced his desire to wage war against the Kingdom of Granada and demanded subsidies to begin battle maneuvers.

Many of the magnates under the Castilian banner were against the siege; this camp was led by John of Castile and Don Juan Manuel who preferred a war of attrition and purely for profit in the area of Vega de Granada. The infante John was further angry with the king because he was not given the title over the municipality of Ponferrada. Don Juan Manuel was dissatisfied because he preferred to wage war against Granada from his home territories in Murcia and did not want to fight in the Algeciras area. To add to these misgivings, Algeciras had been the principal Muslim stronghold on the Iberian Peninsula since the Moors first landed there and was extremely well fortified.

Differences aside, the Castilian forces gathered in Toledo, where they would commence operations. Ferdinand IV left his mother, María de Molina, in charge of governmental operations in his absence.

== Christian mobilization ==
The main vassals contributing troops to operations against Algeciras were the infante John of Castile, Don Juan Manuel, Diego Lopez V de Haro, lord of Biscay, Juan Núñez II de Lara, Fernán Ruiz de Saldaña and Alonso Pérez de Guzmán. Many of Castile's troops were fielded from the civil militia councils of Salamanca, Segovia, Seville and other cities.

Denis of Portugal, a relative of Ferdinand IV, sent 700 knights under the command of Martín Gil de Sousa, his Alférez. James II of Aragon, whose forces attacked other parts of Granada, contributed 10 galleys to the Algeciras blockade force. On 29 April 1309, Pope Clement V issued a papal bull Prioribus decanis, which officially conceded to Ferdinand IV one 10th of all clergy taxes collected in his kingdoms for three years to aid in financing the siege.

From Toledo, Ferdinand IV and his army marched to Córdoba, where James II's emissaries announced that the Aragonese king was prepared to launch the siege against the city of Almeria. Final preparations for the siege were carried out in Seville, where Ferdinand IV arrived in July 1309. The supply train for the invasion army passed through Seville, crossed the Guadalquivir River, and traveled by sea to Algeciras.

== Siege ==
On 27 July 1309, the vanguard of the Castilian army reached the walls of Algeciras, followed by the king and his entourage three days later on 30 July. James II of Aragon began his siege of Almeria on the 15th of August, that same year, a siege that would last until 26 January 1310. While Algeciras was being besieged, Christian forces fighting for Castile under the command of Juan Núñez II de Lara and Alonso Pérez de Guzmán took the city of Gibraltar on 12 September 1309, leading to a major boost in morale for the Castilian army.

In mid-October 1309, the infante John of Castile, his son, Alfonso de Valencia, Don Juan Manuel and Fernán Ruiz de Saldaña, together with about 500 knights, deserted and abandoned the Christian encampment, citing poor living conditions and dissatisfaction with the king due to a delay in the arrival of their pay. This betrayal provoked the indignation of courts all across Europe, being considered so incomprehensible that James II of Aragon himself rode after the traitors to attempt to convince them to return to the siege unsuccessfully. Regardless, Ferdinand IV maintained the support of Juan Núñez II de Lara, who had proved himself in an earlier invasion of Granada, and of Diego Lopez V de Haro and they decided to continue their attempts to retake the city.

The squalor in the Christian camp by the River Andarax eventually reached such alarming proportions that Ferdinand IV was obliged to sell off the jewelry of his wife, Constance of Portugal, to pay the soldiers and knights for their continued service. The Christian forces were soon reinforced by a large army sent by the infante Felipe de Castilla y Molina and another sent by the Archbishop of Santiago de Compostela, who arrived at the head of 400 knights and a great number of foot soldiers.

Towards the end of 1309, Ferdinand IV's siege began to go very poorly as many of his commanders began to fall ill. Diego Lopez V de Haro was afflicted with gout, and Alonso Pérez de Guzmán died in camp. Temporal rains also completely flooded the area where the Christian forces had camped, making it a breeding ground for disease and illness. Ferdinand IV of Castile persisted until January 1310 in his efforts to take the city, when he finally abandoned hope of a victorious outcome and retreated.

== Aftermath ==
In January 1310, Ferdinand IV began negotiations with the Kingdom of Granada. An accord was reached stipulating that Ferdinand IV would receive the border towns of Quesada, Quadros, Belmar and a payment of 5,000 golden pistoles in return for lifting the siege. After the signing of this peace treaty, Diego Lopez V de Haro died in camp at Algeciras and his niece María Díaz I de Haro, wife of the infante John of Castile, took possession of the Lordship of Biscay.

Almost simultaneously with the Castilian defeat at Algeciras, James II of Aragon ordered a lifting of the unsuccessful siege of Almeria by the Kingdom of Aragon.

The campaign of 1309–10 was successful for Ferdinand IV, even though he did not conquer Algeciras, as the city of Gibraltar was incorporated into Castile.

== See also ==
- Siege of Gibraltar (1309)

== Bibliography ==
- Benavides, Antonio (1860). Memorias de Don Fernando IV de Castilla (1ª ed.). Madrid: Imprenta de Don José Rodríguez.
- González Mínguez, César; César González Mínguez (1995). Fernando IV, 1295-1312 (1ª ed.). Palencia: La Olmeda. ISBN 84-8173-027-0.
- Torres Fontes, Juan (1980). Academia Alfonso X el Sabio. Consejo Superior de Investigaciones Científicas (ed.). Documentos de Fernando IV (1ª ed.). ISBN 84-00-04659-5.

na
