= Torralba, Cuenca =

Torralba
- Municipality
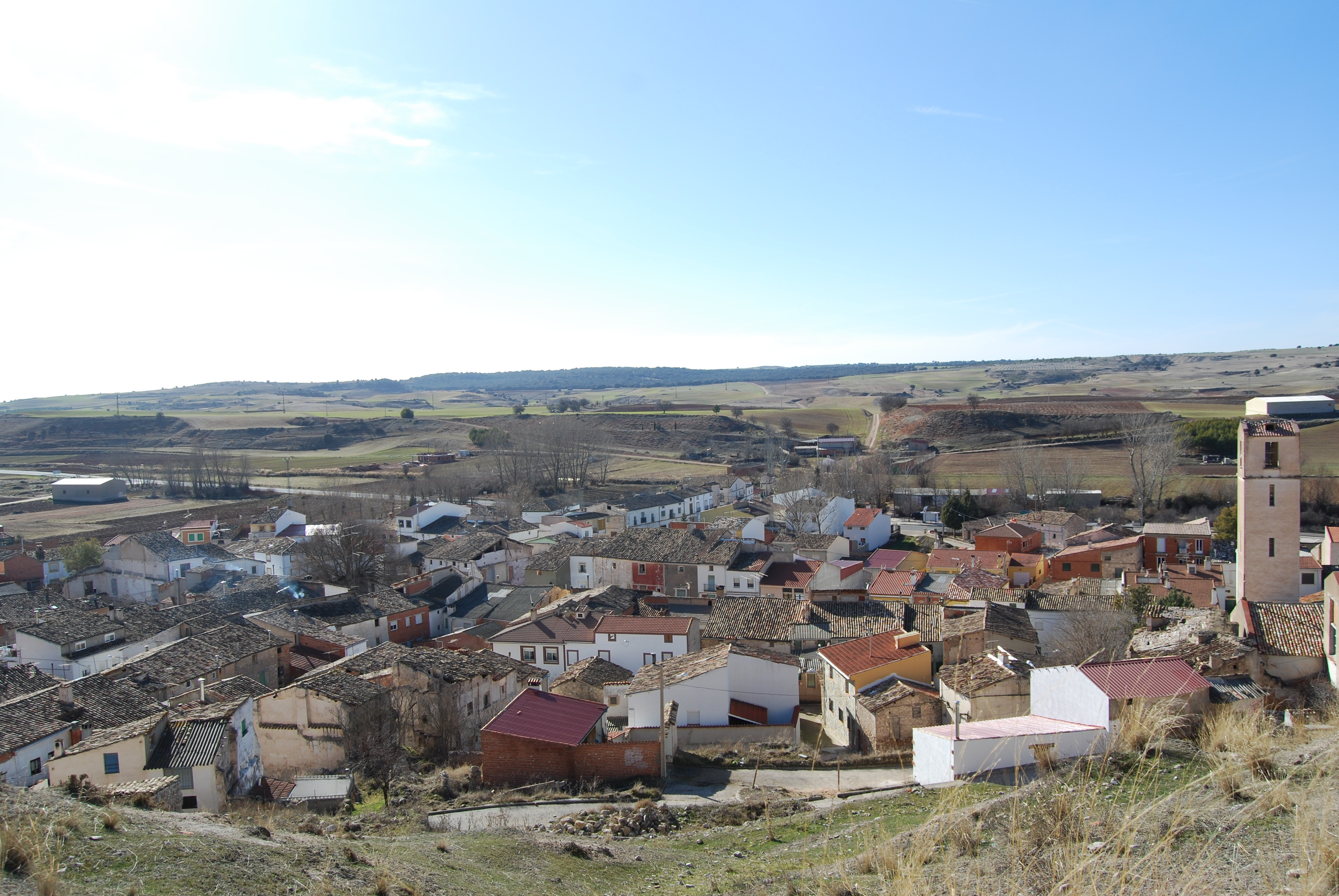

- Flag Coat of arms

- Location within Spain Location within Castilla-La Mancha
- Coordinates: 40°18′10″N 2°17′8″W
- Country: Spain
- Autonomous community: Castile-La Mancha
- Province: Cuenca
- Province: La Alcarria

Government
  - Mayor: Ismael Caracena Lozano

Area
  - Total: 55.49 km^{2} (21.42 sq mi)
- Elevation: 994 m (3,261 ft)

Population (2025-01-01)
  - Total: 107
  - Density: 1.93/km^{2} (4.99/sq mi)
- Demonym: Torralbeños
- Time zone: UTC+1 (CET)
  - Summer (DST): UTC+2 (CEST)
- Postal code: 16842
- Website: Official website

Torralba is a municipality in the province of Cuenca, Castile-La Mancha, Spain. It had a population of 191 in 2004.

== Main sights ==
- Ruins of the castle (or Torre Alba) from which the village takes its name.
- Hermitage of Nuestra Señora de las Nieves (15th-16th century)
- Parish church of Santo Domingo de Silos
