= Capitán Sarmiento Partido =

Capitán Sarmiento Partido de Capitán Sarmiento
- Department
- Location of Capitán Sarmiento Partido in Buenos Aires Province
- Coordinates: 34°11′S 59°46′W
- Country: Argentina
- Established: December 12, 1961
- Founder: Provincial law 2959
- Seat: Capitán Sarmiento

Government
  - Intendant: Fernanda Astorino Hurtado (La Libertad Avanza)

Area
  - Total: 617 km^{2} (238 sq mi)

Population
  - Total: 12,854
  - Density: 20.8/km^{2} (54.0/sq mi)
- Demonym: sarmientense
- Postal Code: B2752
- IFAM: BUE019
- Area Code: 02478
- Patron saint: San Carlos Borromeo
- Website: http://www.capitansarmiento.gov.ar/

Capitán Sarmiento Partido is a partido of Buenos Aires Province in Argentina.

The provincial subdivision has a population of around 12,500 inhabitants in an area of 617 km^{2} (238 sq mi), and its capital city is Capitán Sarmiento, which is around 160 km (99 mi) from Buenos Aires.

The city of Capitán Sarmiento gradually built up around a railway station between San Antonio de Areco and Pergamino. The railway station was named in honour of Domingo Fidel Sarmiento, (adopted son of Domingo Faustino Sarmiento), who died in the Battle of Curupaytí in the Paraguayan War. The town and eventually the partido became known by the same name as the train station.

== Settlements ==
- Capitán Sarmiento
- La Luisa
