= Don García =

Cross of the Order of Calatrava.

Don García (b. ? Navarre – d. ?) was the first grand master of the Order of Calatrava from 1164 to 1169 and was responsible for the foundation of many of the order's rules and battle traditions.

== Biography ==
The exact location of Don García's birth and death are not known although it is believed that he was from Navarre. The reasons for him being named as the first grand master of Calatrava are also unknown although the order was very new at the time of his tenure in office, having been officially recognized by papal bull in 1164. What is certain is that García would have been an exceptional leader and soldier to be tapped for this prestigious role by King Alfonso VIII de Castilla which consisted of overseeing all lands and castles under the order's protection and control. The most famous castle being the one at Almadén.

== Papal bull of 1164 ==
Under his grandmastership, the order obtained its formal charter from the papacy with its customs being modeled around the Cistercian Order from which Calatrava developed. The papal bull, amongst other things, obliged all member knights of the order to observe three ideological virtues: obedience, chastity, and poverty. Member knights were also held to strict living rules such as maintaining silence in their dormitories and eateries, sleeping with their armor on for four days a week, and to keep as their only garment of clothes, a white cloak with a simple black cross called the "Flordelisada" (which became red as seen in above right image in the 14th century).

== Death ==
After his death, Don García was buried in a convent on the outskirts of Guadiana. In 1217, his remains were transferred to the Capilla de los Mártires de Calatrava la Nueva.

Preceded by None	Grand Master of the Order of Calatrava; 1164–1169	Succeeded by Fernando Icaza

== See also ==
- Order of Calatrava
- List of grand masters of the Order of Calatrava
