= Ciruelos, Toledo =

Ciruelos
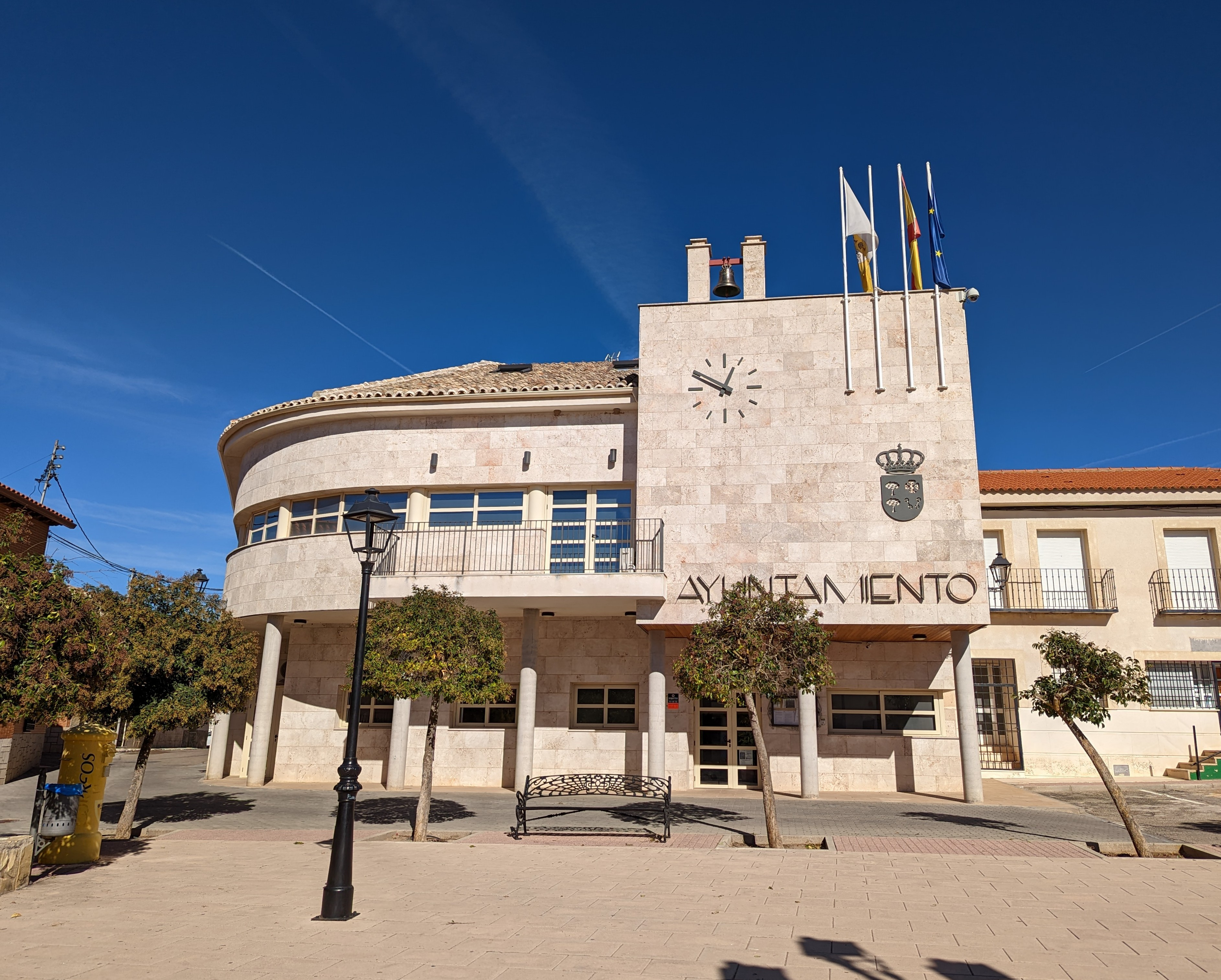
- Town hall

- Flag Coat of arms

- Location in Spain
- Coordinates: 39°56′N 3°36′W
- Country: Spain
- Autonomous community: Castile-La Mancha
- Province: Toledo
- Municipality: Ciruelos

Area
  - Total: 23 km^{2} (8.9 sq mi)
- Elevation: 705 m (2,313 ft)

Population (2025-01-01)
  - Total: 723
- Time zone: UTC+1 (CET)
  - Summer (DST): UTC+2 (CEST)
- Postal code: 45300

Ciruelos [θiˈrwelos] is a municipality located in the province of Toledo, Castile-La Mancha, Spain. According to the 2014 census, the municipality has a population of 611 inhabitants.

It was a filming location for the 1976 horror film Who Can Kill a Child?.

== Demographics ==
Historical population
Year	Pop.	±%
1900	444	—
1910	491	+10.6%
1920	543	+10.6%
1930	513	−5.5%
1940	452	−11.9%
1950	514	+13.7%
1960	426	−17.1%
1970	350	−17.8%
1981	314	−10.3%
1991	327	+4.1%
2001	363	+11.0%
2011	649	+78.8%
2021	616	−5.1%
2023	642	+4.2%
Source: INE
