= Fitero =

- Municipality
- Flag Coat of arms

- Location within Navarre Location within Spain
- Coordinates: 42°3′29″N 1°51′26″W
- Country: Spain
- Autonomous community: Navarre
- Merindad: Tudela

Area
  - Total: 43.2 km^{2} (16.7 sq mi)
- Elevation: 421 m (1,381 ft)

Population (2025-01-01)
  - Total: 2,370
  - Density: 54.9/km^{2} (142/sq mi)
- Postal code: 31593
- Website: www.fitero.es

Fitero is a town and municipality located in the province and autonomous community of Navarre, northern Spain.

The Monastery of Fitero is situated here.

== Monuments ==
Monasterio de Santa María

The Monasterio de Santa María is a magnificent complex of buildings mainly in the Romanesque style, which formerly housed the Cistercian Monastery and its dependencies. The monastery is currently a conglomerate of buildings from different periods, built up around the stunning church and the superb chapter house from the Medieval era. The church, which is of cathedral-like proportions, was started in 1179 and completed in 1247.

The church is one of the largest and most important buildings constructed by the Cistercian order in Spain, with an ambulatory area and five apsidal chapels in it. It consists of three naves, with six sections and a cross section. The vaults and, in general, the entire structure, are of ogival character, with an austere but elegant style. The initiative to build this church is thought to have come from the distinguished Archbishop of Navarra, who was also the chronicler of the battle of the “Navas de Tolosa”, Don Rodrigo Ximénez de Rada. On the right side of the chancel is a magnificent 14th century tomb, which the Archbishop is said to have ordered to be carved for him. However, his remains were not to occupy it, since he was finally buried in the Monastery of St Mary of Huerta. Nearby there is a similar tomb, in which the mitred abbot Fray Marcos de Villalba lies. The main altarpiece was painted by Flemish artist Roland of Mois in 1590.

The cloister was built in the 16th century, with a complicated rib structure and some interesting capitals. It is thought to have been designed by Cantabrian master Juan de Nates together with Juan González de Sisniega. The Chapter House is striking, similar to that in the nearby Monastery of La Oliva, which is still in use as a Cistercian monastery.

Ancient works of art preserved in the Monastery include the reliquary of Saint Blaise, which consists of an enamel casket with a pyramidal cover from the 13th century. Next to it, there is also a 10th-century ivory chest, in the Caliphate style, a Renaissance-style shell-shaped incense burner and several Romanesque and Franco-Gothic polychrome wooden chests.

Since the dissolution of the monasteries in 1835, the church has served as the parish church for Fitero. Other parts of the buildings are used as Town Hall, cinema, café and as private homes. The church and its cloisters can be visited on most days, and excellent dramatised visits are also organised in the summer months.

Balneario de Fitero

The Balneario de Fitero is a well-known spa 4 km from Fitero. Since Roman times, people have come from far and wide to visit the hot springs of the River Alhama, where water comes out of the ground at 52º. The oldest hotel on the site is the "Virrey Palafox", which was founded in 1728. The second hotel is the "Gustavo Adolfo Becquer", named after the Romantic poet who often visited the spa, founded in 1846. The healing powers of the spring water are used to treat arthritis, rheumatism and anxiety, as well as circulatory and breathing problems.

== Geography ==
Location

The town of Fitero is located in the southwest of the Chartered Community of Navarra, within the geographical region knows as the Ribera de Navarra. It is located on the left bank of the Alhama river, and the town has an altitude of 421 meters above sea level. The municipal area covers 43.2 km^{2}, and borders with Cintruenigo and Tudela, to the south, with Tarazona (Zaragoza), and to the west, with the municipalities of Cervera del Rio Alhama and Alfaro in the Community of La Rioja.

Terrain and Hydrology

The highest altitude recorded in the surroundings of Fitero is 740 meters. This corresponds to the Atalaya mountain, where the forest control and observation post is located. Another peak is that of the Navillas mountain at 650.5 meters, where a majestic cement cross stands that presides over the municipality of Cintruenigo. The river Alhama passes through these mountains before it joins the river Linares.

Climate

The climate of the area is of the continental Mediterranean type. This climate, which is typical of the valley of the Ebro, is characterized by strong variations in temperature and scant, irregular rainfall, as well as by long intense dry periods in summer. North winds (known as the "cierzo") is frequent and intense. The average annual temperature ranges between 13º and 14 °C, with annual rainfall being between 400 and 500 mm; only 55 to 60 days of the years are registered as rainy days.
