= Order of Calatrava =

Spanish military-religious order

Order of Calatrava Orden de Calatrava
- The order's emblem, a Calatrava cross, which is a red Greek cross with a fleur-de-lis at each end
- Type: Religious Order of Honour and formerly a Military Order
- Country: Spain
- Royal house: Bourbon-Anjou
- Religious affiliation: Catholic
- Founder: Raymond of Fitero
- Grand Master: King of Spain
- Ribbon bar

The Order of Calatrava (Spanish: Orden de Calatrava) is one of the four Spanish military orders and the first military order founded in Castile, but the second to receive papal approval. The papal bull confirming the Order of Calatrava was given by Pope Alexander III on September 26, 1164. Most of the political and military power of the order had dissipated by the end of the 15th century, but the last dissolution of the order's property did not occur until 1838.

== Origins and foundation ==
It was founded at Calatrava la Vieja in Castile, in the twelfth century by St. Raymond of Fitero, as a military branch of the Cistercian family. Rodrigo of Toledo describes the origins of the order:

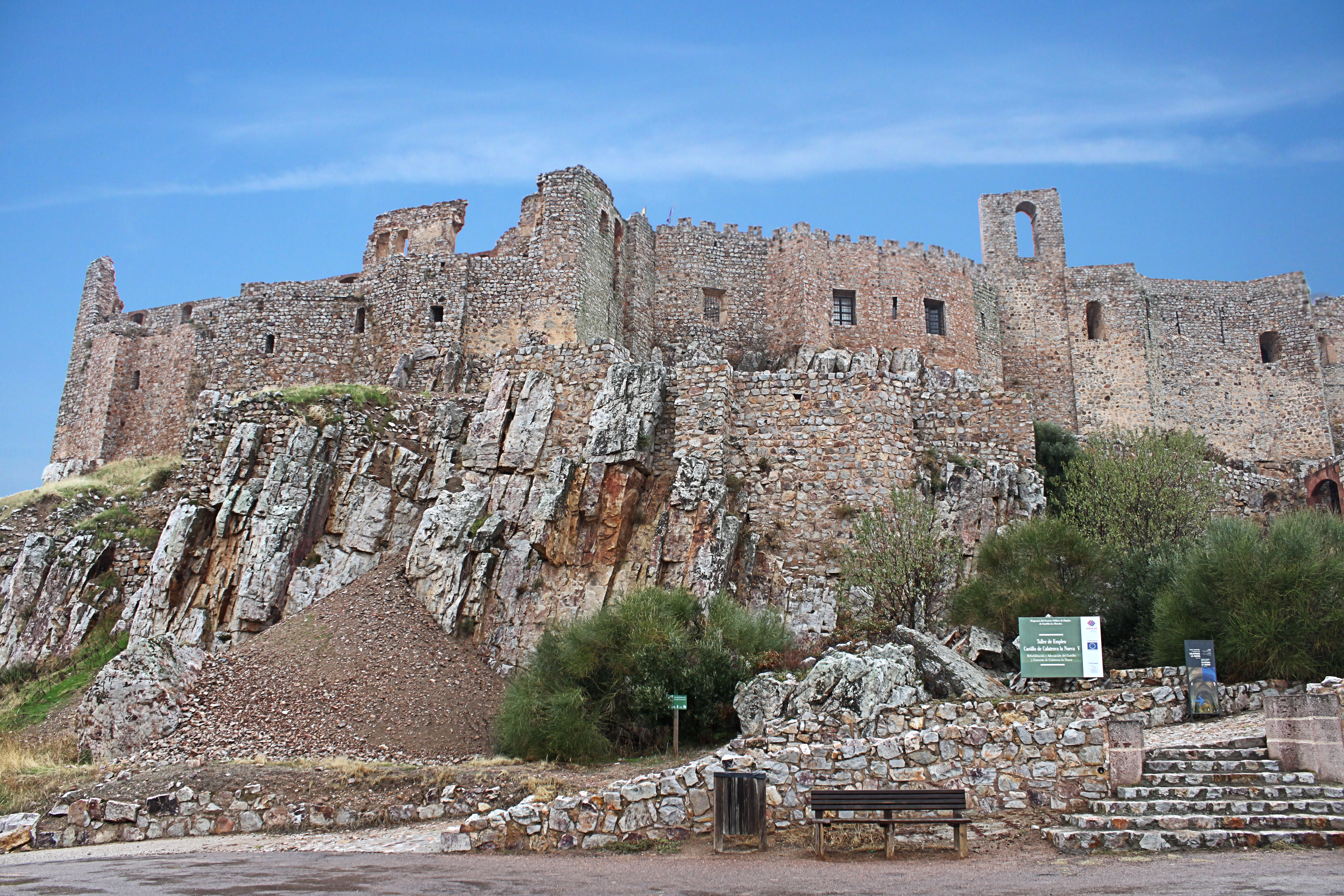
Castle of Calatrava la Nueva, former parent headquarters of the order

Calatrava is the Arabic name of a castle recovered from the Muslims, in 1147, by the King of Castile, Alfonso VII, called el Emperador. Located in what was then the southernmost border of Castile, this conquest was more difficult to keep than to make, especially at a time where neither standing armies nor garrisons were known. In part to correct this deficiency, the military orders such as Knights Templars were founded, where men could fulfill a vow of perpetual war against the Muslim. The Templars, however, were unable to hold Calatrava, and the king found further volunteer warriors when Raymond, Abbot of the Cistercian monastery of Fitero offered himself.

This step is said to have been suggested to the abbot by Father Diego Velázquez, a simple monk, but one who had been a knight, and thus was well acquainted with military matters. Diego was inspired with the idea of employing the lay brothers of the abbey to defend Calatrava. These Cistercian lay brothers—at that time a recent innovation in monastic life—not being in Holy orders, were variously employed in manual trades such as those of tending herds, construction, farm labor, or husbandry. Diego recommended that they become soldiers of the Cross. Thus a new order was created in 1157.

Motivated by the desire for religious and pecuniary rewards, these brethren were eager to take the offensive against the Moors. When the Abbot Raymond died (1163), a certain Don García started to lead them in battle as their first grand master. At the same time, the choir monks, not without protest, left Calatrava to live under an abbot whom they had chosen, in the monastery of Cirvelos. Only Velasquez and a few other clerics, to act as chaplains, remained in Calatrava with the knights, Velasquez becoming prior of the whole community. This somewhat revolutionary arrangement was approved by the general chapter at Cîteaux, and by Pope Alexander III (1164).

A general chapter held at Cîteaux in 1187 gave to the Knights of Calatrava their definitive rule, which was approved in the same year by Pope Gregory VIII. This rule, modeled upon the Cistercian customs for lay brothers, was imposed upon the knights, besides the obligations of the three religious vows, the rules of silence in the refectory, dormitory, and oratory; of abstinence on four days a week, besides several fast days during the year; they were also obliged to recite a fixed number of paternosters for each day Hour of the Office; to sleep in their armour; to wear, as their full dress, the Cistercian white mantle with the scarlet cross fleur de lisée. Calatrava was subject not to Cîteaux, but to Morimond in Champagne, the mother-house of Fitero, from which Calatrava had sprung. Consequently, the Abbot of Morimond possessed the right of visiting the houses and of reforming the statutes of Calatrava, while the highest ecclesiastical dignity of the order, that of grand prior, could be held only by a monk of Morimond.

== Critique ==
The Cistercian monk Isaac of Stella criticised the new militia, which he called a monstrum novum. He did not approve of the forced conversions and the conflation of death in politically-motivated battle with martyrdom.

== Battles during the Reconquista ==
The first military services of the Knights of Calatrava were highly successful, and in return for the exceptional services they had rendered they received from the King of Castile new grants of land, which formed their first commanderies. They had already been called into the neighbouring Kingdom of Aragon, and been rewarded by a new encomienda (landed estate), that of Alcañiz (1179). But these successes were followed by a series of misfortunes, due in the first instance to the unfortunate partition which Alfonso had made of his possessions, and the consequent rivalry which ensued between the Castilian and Leonese branches of his dynasty. On the other hand, the first successes of the Reconquista, in the 12th century, soon met up with a new wave of Islamic warriors, the invasion of the Almohads from Morocco. The first encounter resulted in a defeat for Castile.

=== Battle of Alarcos ===
After the disastrous Battle of Alarcos, the knights abandoned their bulwark of Calatrava to the Almohads (1195). Velasquez lived long enough to witness the failure of his daring scheme. He died the next year in the monastery of Gumiel (1196). The order in Castile appeared to be finished, and the branch of Aragon sought primacy. The Knights of Alcañiz actually proceeded to elect a new grand master, but the grand master still living in Castile claimed his right. Finally, by a compromise, the master of Alcañiz was recognized as second in dignity, with the title of Grand Commander for Aragon.

The scattered remains of Castilian knights sheltered in the Cistercian monastery of Cirvelos, and there began to regroup and expand. They soon erected a new bulwark, Salvatierra Castle, where they took the name, which they kept for fourteen years, of Knights of Salvatierra (1198). But Salvatierra itself fell to the Almohad Caliphate in 1209.

Summoned by Pope Innocent III, foreign crusaders joined Iberian Christians. An early battle was the reconquest of Calatrava (1212), which was returned to its former masters. In the same year the battle of Las Navas de Tolosa turned the tide of Muslim domination in Spain. Having recovered its stronghold, and resumed the title of Calatrava (1216), the order nevertheless removed to more secure quarters of Calatrava la Nueva, eight miles from old Calatrava (1218). In 1221 the Order of Monfragüe was merged into that of Calatrava.

With the decline of Muslim power, new orders sprang up, including the Alcántara in the Kingdom of León and Avis in Portugal. Both began under Calatrava's protection and the visitation of its grand master. This age marks the climax of Iberian chivalry: it was then that King Ferdinand the Saint, after the definitive coalition of Castile and León (1229), in (1235) captured the capital of the old caliphate, Cordova, soon afterwards Murcia, Jaén, and Seville. The European crusade seemed at an end. Encouraged by these victories, Ferdinand's successor, Alfonso X, the Wise, planned a crusade in the East and contemplated marching, with his Castilian knights, to restore the Latin Kingdom of Jerusalem (1272).

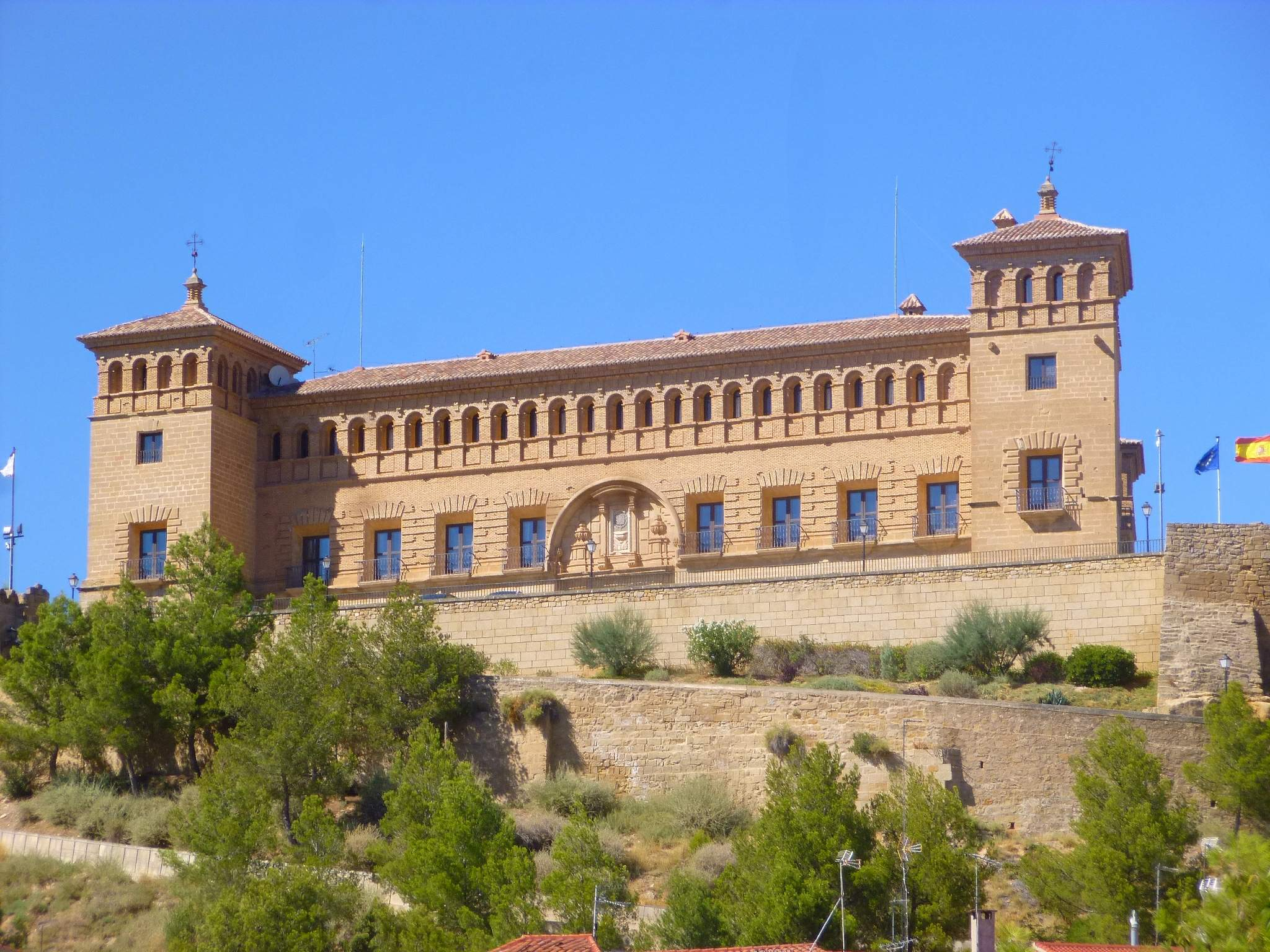
A Calatrava castle in Alcañiz

Calatrava had developed abundant resources of men and wealth, with lands and castles scattered along the borders of Castile. It exercised feudal lordship over thousands of peasants and vassals. Thus, more than once, we see the order bringing to the field, as its individual contributions, 1200 to 2000 knights, a considerable force in the Middle Ages. Moreover, it enjoyed autonomy, being by its constitutions independent in temporal matters and acknowledging only spiritual superiors—the Abbot of Morimond and, in appeal, the pope. These authorities interfered, in consequence of a schism which first broke out in 1296 through the simultaneous election of two grand masters, García Lopez and Gautier Perez.

Lopez, dispossessed a first time by a delegate of Morimond, appealed to Pope Boniface VIII, who quashed the sentence and referred the case to the general chapter at Cîteaux, where Lopez was re-established in his dignity (1302). Dispossessed a second time, in consequence of a quarrel with his lieutenant, Juan Nuñez, Lopez voluntarily resigned in favour of Nuñez, who had taken his place (1328), on condition that he should keep the commandery of Zurita; as this condition was violated, Lopez again, for the third time, took the title of Grand Master in Aragon, where he died in 1336. These facts sufficiently prove that after the fourteenth century the rigorous discipline and fervent observance of the order's earlier times had, under the relaxing influence of prosperity, given place to a spirit of intrigue and ambition.

Peter of Castile entered into a conflict with the order. That prince had three grand masters in succession sentenced to death, as having incurred his suspicion: the first of these was beheaded (1355) on a charge of having entered into a league with the King of Aragon; the second, Estevañez, having competed for the grand mastership with the king's candidate, García de Padilla, was murdered in the royal palace, by the king's own treacherous hand; lastly García de Padilla himself, a brother of the royal mistress, fell into disgrace, upon deserting the king's party for that of his half brother, Henry the Bastard, and died in prison (1369).

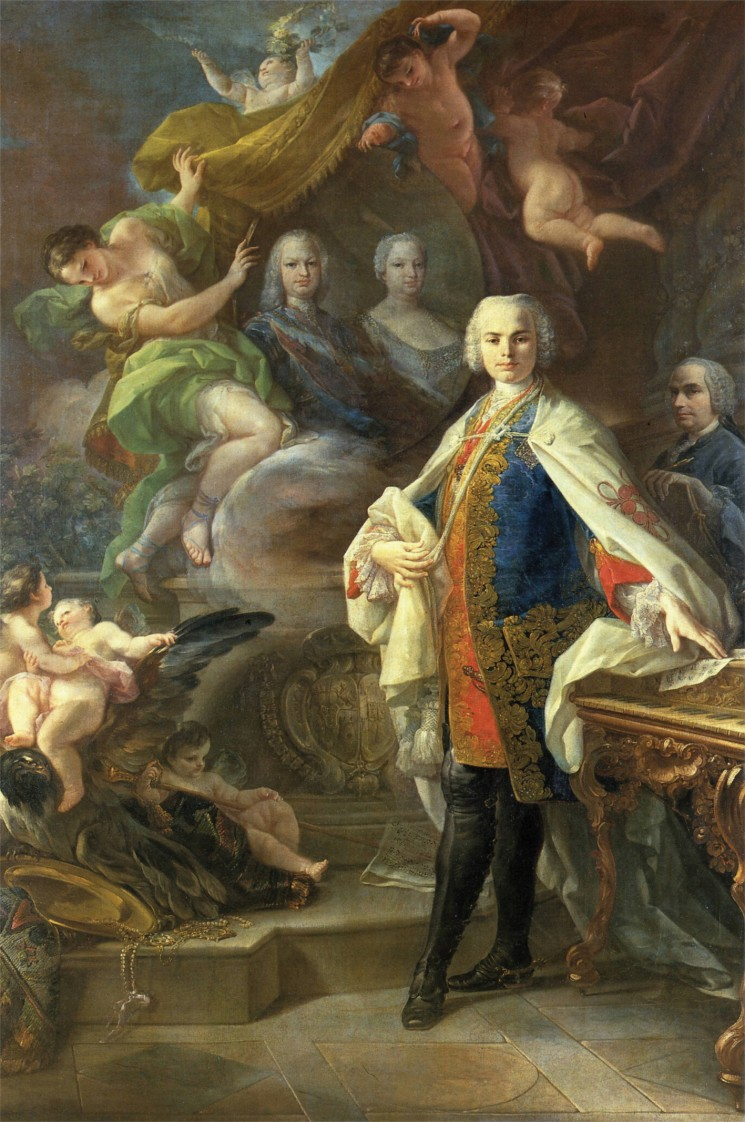
The Italian castrato singer Carlo Broschi in robes of the order. Behind, Ferdinand VI and his wife Barbara of Portugal, c. 1753.

At the same time began the encroachments of royal authority in the election of the grand master, whose power was a check upon that of the king. For instance, in 1404, Henry of Villena, Enrique de Villena, was elected twenty-fourth grand master merely through the favour of Henry III of Castile, although Villena was married, a stranger to the order, and by papal dispensation entered upon his high functions without even the preliminary of a novitiate. A schism in the order ensued and was healed only after the king's death, in 1414, when a general chapter, held at Cîteaux, cancelled the election of Villena and acknowledged his competitor, Luis González de Guzmán, as the only legitimate master. After the death of Guzman in 1442, a new encroachment of John II of Castile gave rise to a new schism. He had succeeded in forcing upon the electors his own candidate, Alfonso, a bastard, of the royal stock of Aragon (1443); but Alfonso having joined a party formed against him, the king sought to have him deposed by the chapter of the order.

This time the electors divided, and a double election issued in not fewer than three grand masters: Pedro Giron, who took possession of Calatrava; Ramirez de Guzman, who occupied the castles of Andalusia; and the bastard Alfonso of Aragon, who continued to be recognized by the knights of the Aragonese branch. At last, through the withdrawal of his rivals one after the other, Pedro Giron remained the only grand master (1457). Giron belonged to an eminent Castilian family descending from Portugal; an ambitious intriguer, more anxious about his family interests than about those of his order, he played an important part as a leader in the factions which disturbed the wretched reigns of John II and Henry IV, the last two lamentably weak descendants of St. Ferdinand of Castile.

By turns, Giron sustained first Henry IV, in a war against his father, John II, then Alfonso, who pretended to the throne, against Henry IV. Such was Giron's importance that Henry IV, to attach him to his cause, offered him the hand of his own sister, Isabella I of Castile. Giron had already had his vow of celibacy annulled by the pope, and was on his way to the court, when he died, thus saving the future Queen of Castile from an unworthy consort (1466). The same pope, Pius II, granted to Pedro Giron the extravagant privilege of resigning his high dignity in favour of his bastard, Rodrigo Téllez Girón, a child eight years old.

Thus the grand mastership fell into the hands of guardians—an unheard of event. The Abbot of Morimond was called upon to devise a temporary administration, until Tellez should reach his majority. The administration was entrusted to four knights elected by the chapter, and from this period date the definitive statutes of the order known as "Rules of Abbot William III" (1467). These statutes recognized in the order seven high dignitaries: the grand master; the clavero (guardian of the castle and lieutenant of the grand master); two grand comendadores, one for Castile and the other for Aragon; the grand prior, representing the Abbot of Morimond in the spiritual government; the sacristan (guardian of the relics); and the obrero (supervisor of buildings).

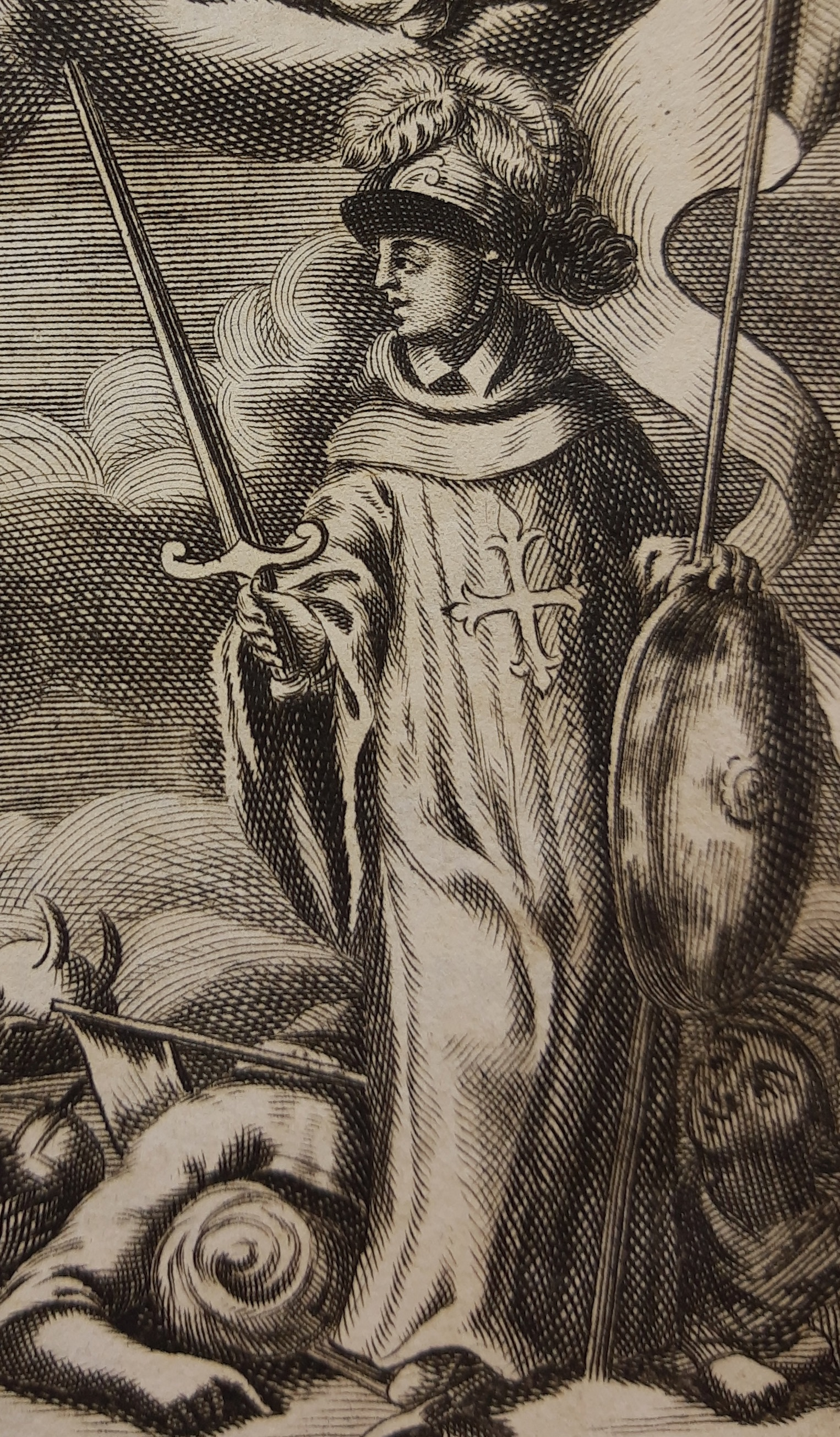
A knight portrayed in the monastic cowl (1731)

The order, having reached its apogee of prosperity, now held sway over fifty-six commanderies and sixteen priories, or cures, distributed between the Diocese of Jaén and the Vicariate of Ciudad Real. Its lordships included sixty-four villages, with a population of 200,000 souls, and produced an annual income estimated at 50,000 ducats. The kings whose fortune the mismanagement of the late reigns had depleted could not but covet these riches, while such formidable military power filled with distrust the monarchs who were obliged to tolerate the autonomous existence of the order. During the struggle between Afonso V of Portugal and Ferdinand of Aragon for the right of succession to Henry IV of Castile, the last male of his house (1474), much depended upon the attitude of Calatrava.

The knights were divided. While the grand master, Rodrigo Téllez Girón, supported Portugal, his lieutenant, Lopez de Padilla, stood by Aragon. The battle of Toro (1479), where the pretensions of Portugal were annihilated, ended this schism, the last in the history of the order. The grand master, reconciled with Ferdinand of Aragon, fell, during the war against the Moors, at the siege of Loja (1482). His lieutenant, Lopez de Padilla, succeeded him and, as the last of the twenty-seven independent grand masters of Calatrava, revived for a season the heroic virtues of his order's better days. A mortified monk in his cell, a fearless warrior on the battlefield, the glory of Padilla shed its last rays in the war of the conquest of Granada, which he did not live to see completed.

== After the fall of Granada ==
At Padilla's death (1487), Ferdinand of Aragon exhibited to the chapter, assembled for the election of a new grand master, a Bull from Innocent VIII that invested him with authority to administer the order, and to this decree he compelled the electors to submit. Thus ended the political autonomy of the Order of Calatrava. The reason of its being—the struggle against the Moors—seemed, indeed, to end with the fall of Granada (1492).

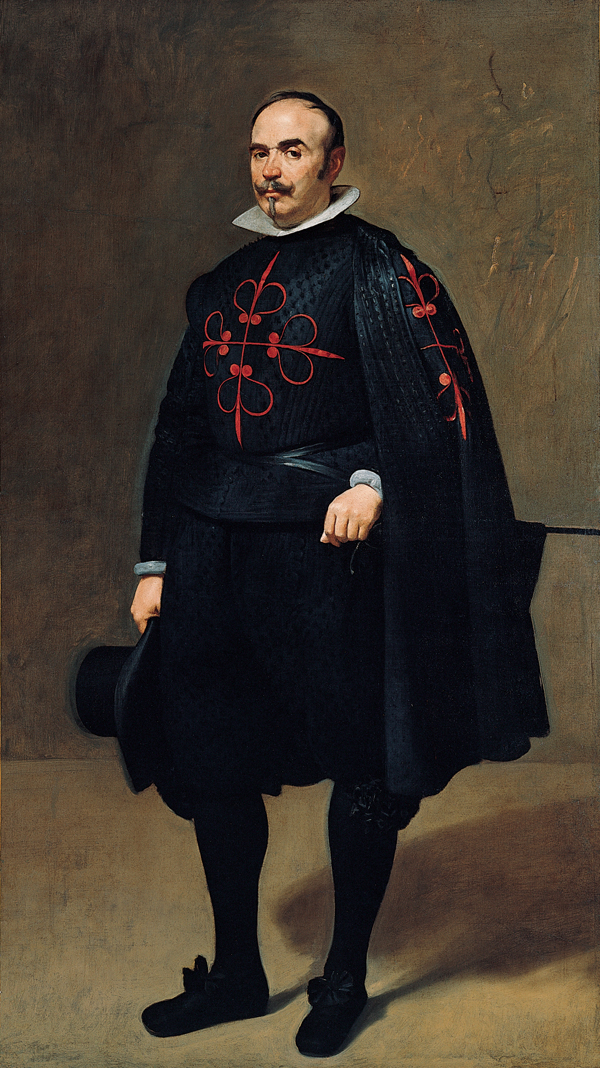
Pedro de Barberana y Aparregui, Knight of Calatrava, by Diego Velázquez (1631) Kimbell Art Museum, Fort Worth.

The canonical bond between Calatrava and Morimond had been relaxing more and more. The King of Spain was too jealous of his authority to tolerate any foreign—especially French—intervention in the affairs of his kingdom. The canonical visits of the Abbot of Morimond ceased; difficulties were raised when the grand prior came from Morimond to take possession of his dignity. The last French prior was Nicholas of Avesnes, who died in 1552.

After a long contest, a compromise was effected in 1630, leaving to Morimond its right of electing the grand prior, but limiting its choice to Spanish Cistercians. Moreover, the knights of the order were virtually secularized: Pope Paul III commuted their vow of celibacy to one of conjugal fidelity (1540).

As members of the order were allowed to found families, and were authorized by Julius III (1551) to make free use of their personal property, the vow of poverty also passed into virtual desuetude. In 1652, under Philip IV, the three Spanish orders took a new vow: that of defending the doctrine of the Immaculate Conception. This was the last manifestation of any religious spirit in the orders. The military spirit, too, had long since disappeared. The orders had, in fact, fallen into a state of utter inactivity.

By the 17th century, the commanderies were essentially pensions that the king freely distributed, typically granting them to individuals of noble birth rather than to those of good character or merit, regardless of their social status. In 1628 the Order of Calatrava was declared to be inaccessible not only to tradesmen, but even to sons of tradesmen. The last attempt to employ the knights of the three orders for a military purpose was that of Philip IV, in quelling the rebellion of the Catalans (1640–50), but the orders restricted their efforts to the complete equipment of one regiment, which has since been known in the Spanish army as "The Regiment of the Orders".

In 1750 the singer Farinelli was made a Knight of the Order of Calatrava.

When the Bourbon dynasty occupied the throne, Charles III, having founded the personal order of his name, levied upon the old orders a contribution of a million reals to pension 200 knights of the new order (1775). Their revenues being the only remaining raison d'être of the order, confiscation necessarily led to dissolution. Confiscated by King Joseph (1808), re-established by Ferdinand VII at the Restoration (1814), the possessions of Calatrava were finally dissipated in the general secularization of 1838.

== Modern times ==
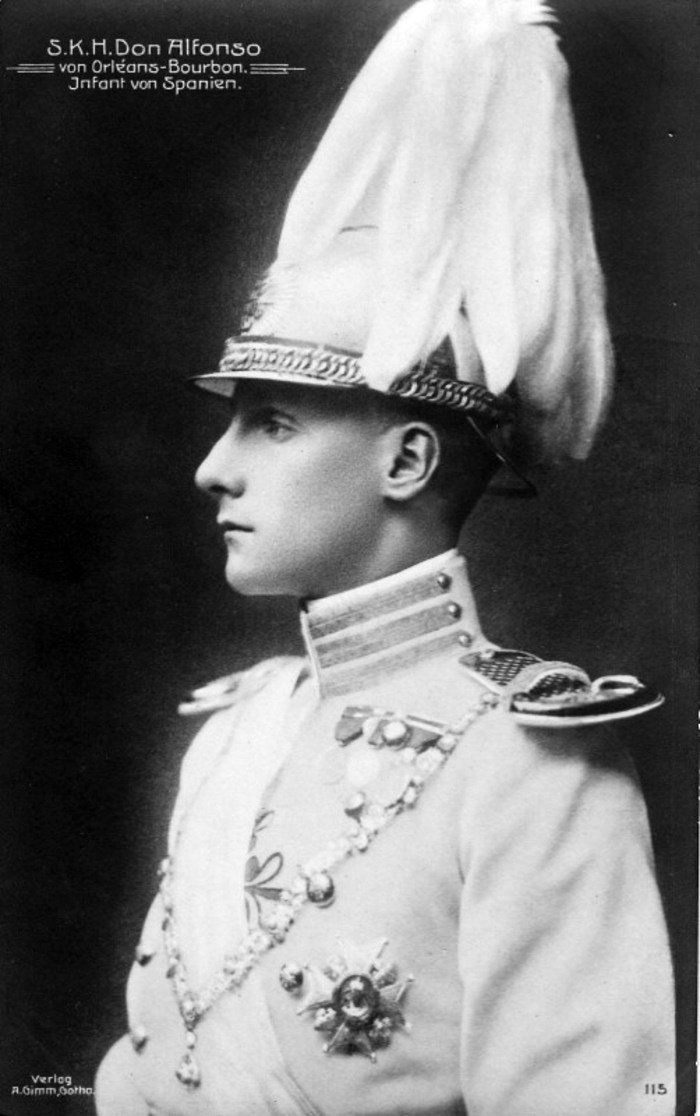
The Duke of Galliera in contemporary uniform of the Order, c. 1910

In 1931, once again unilaterally, the Second Spanish Republic suppressed the Spanish Orders. To survive, they resorted to the Ley de Asociaciones Civiles ("Law of Civil Associations"), leading a precarious existence until the Concordat of 1953 recognized its Priory. The papal bull Constat militarium, later reduced this Priory to a mere title of the Bishop of Ciudad Real.

In 1980, upon request by his father, who was appointed Dean President of the Council, King Juan Carlos I reinstated the Orders by royal initiative. Under the Apostolic Pastoral Tertio millennio adveniente, the Spanish Orders began their renewal in 1996.

Today, the aim of the Spanish Orders is basically the same as they had when founded: the defense of the Catholic faith. The sword has been put aside, but their doctrine, example, self-sanctification, and divine worship remain active, aside from their cultural and social activities.

Their two hundred and fifty members guard the spirit and life of the Orders of Santiago, Calatrava, Alcántara, and Montesa under their Grand Master, King Felipe VI, and the Real Consejo de las Órdenes (Royal Council of the Orders) presided over by his Royal Highness Pedro of Bourbon-Two Sicilies, Duke of Calabria.

The Swiss luxury watchmaker Patek Philippe took the cross of the order in 1887 and established it as its company logo as a tribute to the knights, which remains until today.

== See also ==
- Grand Masters of the Order of Calatrava
- Order of Santiago

== Sources ==
- Linehan, Peter (2011). Spain: A Partible Inheritance, 1157–1300. Blackwell Publishing Ltd.
- Joseph F. O'Callaghan: The Affiliation of the Order of Calatrava with the Order of Cîteaux, Analecta Cisterciensia 16 (1960), 3–59.
- Joseph F. O'Callaghan: The Order of Calatrava and the Archbishops of Toledo. In: Studies in medieval Cistercian history. Presented to Jeremiah F. O'Sullivan (Cistercian Publications 1971) p. 63-.
- Moeller, C. (1908). "Military Order of Calatrava". The Catholic Encyclopedia. Robert Appleton Company.
- Sophia Menache, "Medieval states and military orders: the Order of Calatrava in the late Middle Ages," in Iris Shagrir, Ronnie Ellenblum, and Jonathan Riley-Smith (eds), In laudem Hierosolymitani: Studies in Crusades and Medieval Culture in Honour of Benjamin Z. Kedar (Aldershot, Ashgate, 2007) (Crusades - Subsidia, 1).
