= Hernando de Bustamante =

Spanish sailor, barber surgeon

- Born: Hernando de Bustamante Cáceres de Mérida; Alcántara or Mérida, Spain
- Baptised: 1494 in Alcántara
- Died: 1533 (aged 38–39); Indian Ocean near the Maldives
- Citizenship: Castilian
- Occupations: Barber Surgeon, Expedition medicine
- Known for: The Magellan expedition; First medical professional to circumnavigate the world
- Spouse: María Rodríguez

Hernando de Bustamante was a Spanish sailor and barber surgeon who is best known as one of the few survivors of the first circumnavigation of the globe. He sailed on the Magellan-Elcano expedition from 1519 to 1522.

== Early life ==
Not much is known of Bustamante's life before his experiences on the Magellan expedition. The registry for the Magellan-Elcano expedition in 1519 document that Bustamante was a barber surgeon, a native of Mérida, was the son Juan de Bustamante and Leonor de Cáceres, lived in Alcántara, and was the husband of María Rodríguez. However, the registry for the Loaísa expedition in 1524, Bustamante is listed as a native of Alcántara. Baptismal records from the parish of Santa María Almócova indicate Bustamante was born in Alcántara in 1494.

== The Magellan-Elcano expedition ==
Bustamante served as the barber-surgeon aboard the Victoria, one of the five ships in the original fleet of the Magellan-Elcano expedition. As one of the three barber-surgeons on the crew, Bustamante's duties may have included medical tasks such as tooth extraction, setting bones, and amputations.

Bustamante was one of only 18 crew members who returned to Spain with Juan Sebastián Elcano on the Victoria. Elcano chose Bustamante as his companion to meet with Emperor Charles V and report on the details of the expedition.

As one of the 18 survivor of the original 270 crew, Bustamante's personal account of the expedition's journey is a valuable primary source for historians studying the first circumnavigation, especially his deposition on 18 October 1522.

== The Loaísa Expedition ==
A few years after his return to Spain, Bustamante joined the Loaísa expedition, which aimed to establish a Spanish presence in the Spice Islands.

After the deaths of both Loaísa and Elcano, Bustamante was appointed treasurer of the flagship, the Santa María de la Victoria, the only ship to of the original seven to reach the Spice Islands in September 1526. By this point in the expedition, Bustamante was one of only 24 men from the original crew of 450 survived to land in the Spice Islands.

The Loaísa expedition was plagued by misfortune and conflict with the Portuguese India Armadas, who also sought to control the spice trade. After a period of fighting, the Loaísa expedition struck a deal with the Portuguese India Armadas for their return home.

== Death ==
Bustamante did not complete his return journey to Europe, dying at sea near the Maldives on a Portuguese ship around 1533. He came close to completing a second circumnavigation but perished on the return leg of his second voyage.

== See also ==
- Magellan expedition
- Expedition medicine
- Crew of the Victoria
- Loaísa expedition
