= Nicolás de Ovando =

Spanish explorer, colonial governor

The Most Excellent Nicolás de Ovando KOA
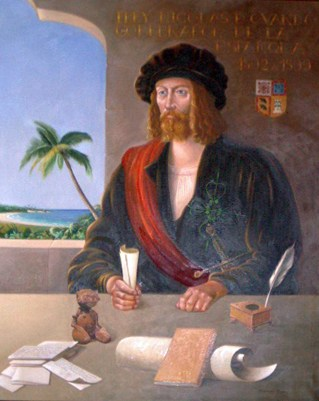

4th Governor General of the Viceroyalty of the Indies
- In office 15 April 1502 – 10 July 1509
- Monarchs: Isabella I & Ferdinand V (until 1504); Joanna I (after 1504) co-monarch: Philip I (1506)
- Preceded by: Francisco de Bobadilla
- Succeeded by: Diego Columbus

Personal details
- Born: 1460 Brozas, Crown of Castile
- Died: 29 May 1511 (aged 50-51) Seville, Crown of Castile
- Resting place: Church of San Benito de Alcántara

Frey Nicolás de Ovando (c. 1460 – 29 May 1511 (Note: Some sources place his death in 1518.)) was a Spanish imperial soldier from a noble family and a Knight of the Order of Alcántara, a military order of Spain. He was Governor of the Indies in the Columbian Viceroyalty (seated in Hispaniola) from 1502 until 1509, sent by the Spanish crown to investigate the administration of Francisco de Bobadilla and re-establish order. Ovando "pacified" the island of Hispaniola by force, subduing Indigenous people and rebellious Spaniards, with disorderly colonists being sent back to Spain in chains. He implemented the encomienda system with the Indigenous population.

== Early life ==
Nicolás de Ovando was born around 1460 in Extremadura. Some place his birth in Brozas, but Gonzalo Fernández de Oviedo knew him well and said he was a native of the city of Cáceres. Belonging to a distinguished family, he was the second son of Captain Diego de Cáceres Ovando and his wife Isabel de Flores Gutierrez , a native of the town of Brozas. His elder brother was Diego de Cáceres y Ovando.

Ovando entered the military Order of Alcántara, where he became a "Master" (Mestre or Maitre) or a Commander-Major (Comendador-Mayor). This Spanish military order, founded in 1156, resembled the Order of Templars, with whom it fought the Moors during the Reconquista.

== Career ==
As Commander of Lares, Ovando became a favourite of the Spanish Catholic Monarchs, particularly pious Queen Isabella I of Castile. Thus, on 3 September 1501, in response to complaints from Christopher Columbus and others about Francisco de Bobadilla, Isabella appointed Ovando to replace Bobadilla. Ovando became the third Governor of the Indies, the Islands, and the Province of Tierra Firme.

=== Expedition to the Americas ===
On 13 February 1502, he sailed from Spain with a fleet of thirty ships. It was the largest fleet that had ever sailed to the New World.

The thirty ships carried around 2,500 colonists. Unlike Columbus's earlier voyages, this group of colonists was deliberately selected to represent an organized cross-section of Spanish society. The Spanish Crown intended to develop the West Indies economically and thereby expand Spanish political, religious, and administrative influence in the region. Along with him also came Francisco Pizarro, who would later explore western South America and conquer the Inca Empire. Another ship carried Bartolomé de las Casas, who became known as the 'Protector of the Indians' for exposing atrocities committed by Ovando and his subordinates. Hernán Cortés, a family acquaintance and distant relative, was supposed to sail to the Americas in this expedition, but was prevented from making the journey by an injury he sustained while hurriedly escaping from the bedroom of a married woman of Medellín. (Note: Ovando made Hernán Cortés a notary and awarded him a land grant nonetheless. This started Cortés' career as a conquistador.)

The expedition reached Santo Domingo in April 1502, and included Diego de Nicuesa and Lucas Vázquez de Ayllón. Also on board were 13 Franciscans, led by Friar Alonso de Espinar, bringing the total on the island to 25.

=== Administration in Hispaniola ===
Island Hispaniola with Captaincy General of Santo Domingo

When Ovando arrived in Hispaniola in 1502, he found the once-peaceful natives in revolt. Ovando and his subordinates ruthlessly suppressed this rebellion through a series of bloody campaigns, including the Jaragua Massacre and Higüey Massacre. Ovando's administration in Hispaniola became notorious for its cruelty toward the Indigenous people. Estimates of the Indigenous population at the time of the arrival of the Spaniards in 1492 vary, with Anderson Córdova giving a maximum of 500 000 people inhabiting the island. A 2020 genetic analysis estimated the population to be no more than a few tens of thousands of people. By the 1507 census, according to Bartolomé de las Casas, battlefield slaughter, enslavement and disease had reduced the native population to 60 000 people, and the decline continued. In 1501, Ovando ordered the first importation of Spanish-speaking black slaves into the Americas. Many Spanish aristocrats ordered slaves to work as servants in their homes.

After the conquests made by his lieutenants including Juan Ponce de León and Juan de Esquivel, Ovando founded several cities on Hispaniola. He also developed the mining industry, introduced the cultivation of sugar cane with plants imported from the Canary Islands, and commissioned expeditions of discovery and conquest throughout the Caribbean. Ovando allowed Spanish settlers to use the natives in forced labour, a system known as encomienda, to provide food for the colonists and for ships returning to Spain. Certain sources estimate that hundreds of thousands of Indigenous people died while being forced to extract gold from the nearby mines.

Pursuant to a deathbed promise he made to his wife Queen Isabella I, King Ferdinand II of Aragon recalled Ovando to Spain in 1509 to answer for his treatment of the native people. Diego Columbus was appointed his successor as governor, but the Spanish Crown permitted Ovando to retain possession of the property he brought back from the Americas.

== Later years ==
Little is known of Ovando's activities after his return to Spain in 1509. He probably spent much of his time in the town of Brozas, the headquarters of the Order of Alcántara. In February 1511, Ferdinand ordered Ovando to accompany him on a campaign against Oran, in North Africa. The expedition never took place but Ovando was present at a general meeting of his order in Seville at the beginning of May. On 29 May 1511, Ovando died in Seville. His body was transferred to the monastery of San Benito de Alcántara. In his will, he founded a chapel and requested that the friars say a requiem mass every week.

== See also ==
- Colony of Santo Domingo
- People from the Colony of Santo Domingo
- Spanish Empire
- Spanish West Indies
- Viceroyalty of New Spain

== Bibliography ==
- Altman, Ida (2021). Life and Society in the Early Spanish Caribbean : the Greater Antilles, 1493-1550. Baton Rouge: Louisiana State University Press. ISBN 978-0-8071-7597-2. OCLC 1237649719.
- Cook, Noble David (2008). "Ovando, Nicolas de". In Kinsbruner, Jay (ed.). Encyclopedia of Latin American History and Culture. Charles Scribner's Sons. ISBN 978-0-684-31590-4.
- Floyd, Troy S. (1973). The Columbus Dynasty in the Caribbean, 1492-1526. Albuquerque: University of New Mexico Press. ISBN 0-8263-0283-1. OCLC 790464.
- Lamb, Ursula (1956). Frey Nicolás de Ovando, Governador de Indias, 1501-1509.
- Lamb, Ursula (1992). "Ovando, Nicolás de". The Christopher Columbus Encyclopedia. New York: Simon & Schuster. pp. 527–528.
- Márquez, Luis Arranz (2024). "Nicholas de Ovando". Real Academia de la Historia (in Spanish).
- Rainsford, Marcus (2013) [1805]. An Historical Account of the Black Empire of Hayti. ISBN 978-0822352884.
- Sauer, Carl Ortwin (1966). The Early Spanish Main. University of California Press.
- Simpson, Lesley Byrd (2023). The Encomienda in New Spain: The Beginning of Spanish Mexico. Univ of California Press. pp. 16–20. ISBN 978-0-520-31518-1.

Attribution

- Wilson, James Grant; Fiske, John, eds. (1898). Appleton's Cyclopaedia of American Biography. D. Appleton. p. 612.
