= Antonio de Nebrija =

Spanish humanist (1444–1522)

- Elio Antonio de Nebrija
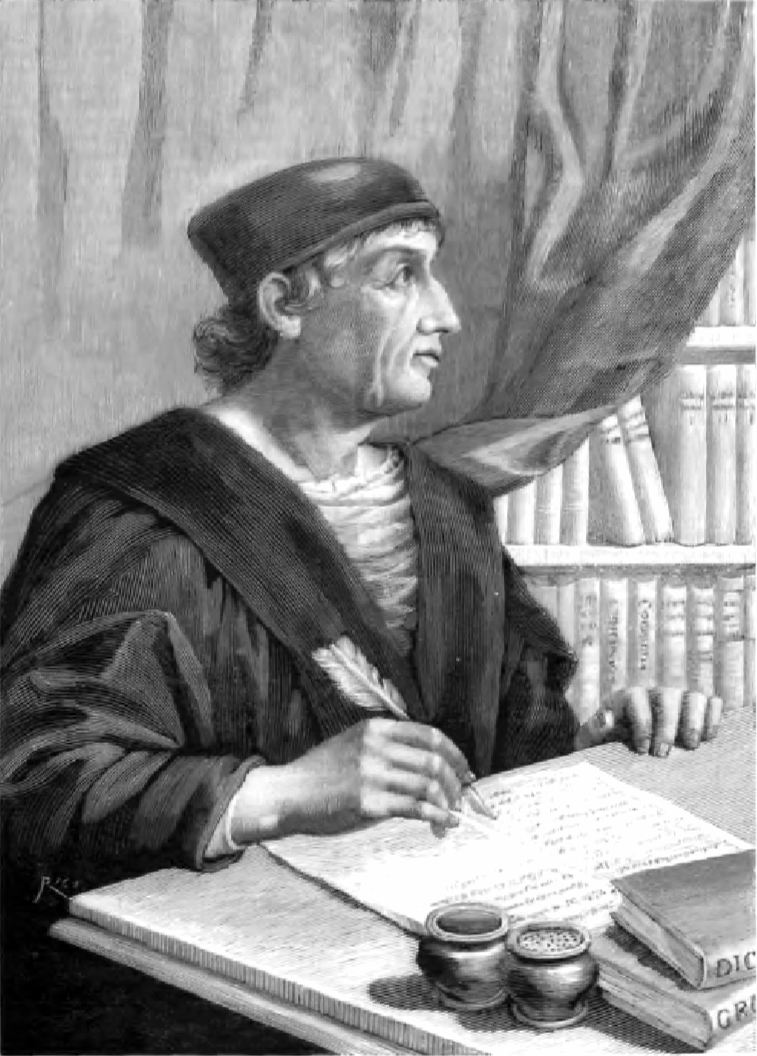
- Born: Antonio Martínez de Cala; 1444; Lebrija, Province of Seville
- Died: 5 July 1522 (aged 77–78); Alcalá de Henares, Spain
- Education: University of Salamanca; Colegio de San Clemente; University of Alcalá de Henares
- Alma mater: Bologna University
- Occupations: Linguist, poet, humanist
- Relatives: Possibly Antonio de Lebrija (grandson)
- Writing career
- Pen name: [Aelius] Antonius Nebrissensis; Antonio of Lebrixa
- Language: Spanish
- Years active: 1473–1517
- Period: Spanish Renaissance
- Subject: Castilian grammar
- Notable works: Gramática de la lengua castellana, 1492

Antonio de Nebrija (1444 – 5 July 1522) was a Spanish humanist. He wrote poetry, commented on literary works, and encouraged the study of classical languages and literature, but his most important contributions were in the fields of grammar and lexicography. Nebrija was the author of the Spanish Grammar (Gramática de la lengua castellana, 1492) and the first dictionary of the Spanish language (1495). His grammar is the first published grammar study of any modern European language.

Nebrija was one of the most influentual Spanish humanists and an illustrious member of the School of Salamanca. His chief works were published and republished many times during and after his life, and his scholarship had a great influence for more than a century, both in Spain and in the expanding Spanish Empire.

== Name ==
Nebrija was baptized Antonio Martínez de Cala. In typical Renaissance humanist fashion, he Latinized his name as Aelius Antonius Nebrissensis (or Elio Antonio de Nebrija in Spanish) by taking Aelius from the Roman inscriptions of his native Lebrija, known in Roman times as Nebrissa Veneria. He was also known as Antonio de Lebrija, Antonius Nebrissensis, and Antonio de Lebrixa.

== Biography ==
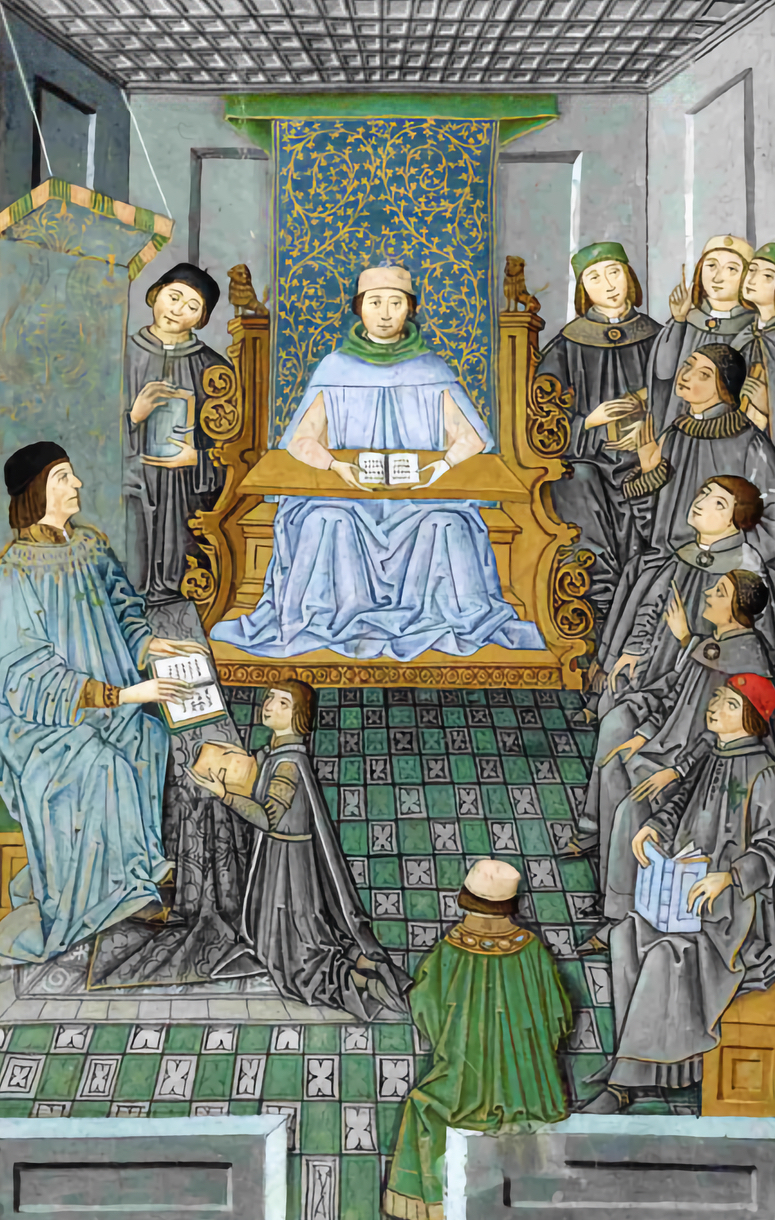
Antonio de Nebrija teaching. Introducciones Latinae in the presence of D. Juan de Zuniga, 1486

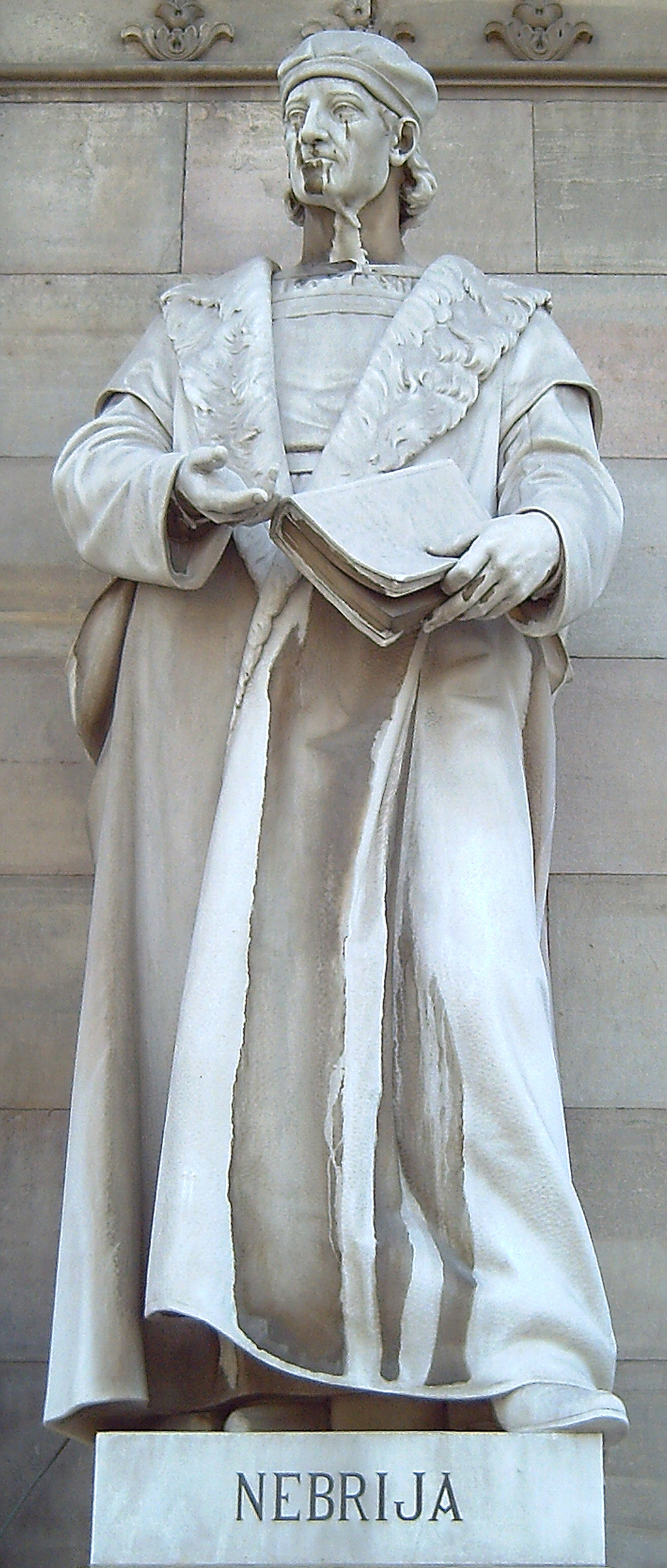
Statue outside the Biblioteca Nacional de España, Madrid

Nebrija was born into an hidalgo family in Nebrixa, a town now called Lebrija in the province of Seville. His parents were Juan Martínez de Cala and Catalina de Xarana. He was the second of five children. There is some uncertainty about his date of birth. Nebrija wrote that he was born the year before the Battle of Olmedo in 1445, putting his birthday in 1444 but elsewhere he makes other references that would contradict this date. Traditionally, 1444 has been accepted as his year of birth.

At age fourteen, Nebrija enrolled at the University of Salamanca, where he studied mathematics, philosophy, law and theology. These latter topics earned him a scholarship from the bishopric of Seville to study theology at the Royal College of Spain in Bologna. Little is known about his studies in Italy except that he was inspired by the works of the Italian humanists, especially Lorenzo Valla. After ten years in Italy Nebrija returned to Spain armed with the new concepts of Renaissance humanism.

Once back in Spain, Nebrija served Alonso de Fonseca y Ulloa, archbishop of Seville, for three years. When Fonseca died in 1473, Nebrija returned to the University of Salamanca as a lecturer. In 1476 he was appointed First Chair of Grammar and in 1481 he published his first work, the Introductiones latinae (Introduction to Latin), a textbook on Latin grammar and literature. The first printing of 1,000 copies quickly sold out and was reprinted dozens of times in his lifetime.

He married Isabel Montesino de Solís in 1487 and eventually fathered seven children. When Juan de Zúñiga, the master of the Order of Alcántara, offered him patronage, Nebrija quit the university in Salamanca and moved to Badajoz, where he lived for the next twelve years.

After the success of his Latin textbook, Nebrija's literary scholarship turned to focus on Castilian rather than classical languages. In 1492 he published Gramática de la lengua castellana (Grammar of the Castilian Language), which he dedicated to Queen Isabella I of Castile. His book was one of the first to codify a European vernacular language, and it ultimately had considerable political and scholarly influence. Nebrija recognized that language played a crucial role in governance of the state. In his dedication he wrote to Isabella that language was "the instrument of empire" and suggested that his grammar would prove useful as the Catholic monarchs conquered peoples who spoke languages other than Castilian.

In 1492 Nebrija also published the Diccionario latino-español (Latin-Spanish Dictionary). It was not the first Latin-Spanish dictionary (Alfonso de Palencia published one in 1490) but it would become hugely influential, in part because a few years later he reversed the order and published his Vocabulario español-latino (Spanish-Latin Vocabulary) in 1495. For the next century, the Spanish-Latin vocabulary continued to evolve with new words and translations. It also served as the basis for other authors developing non-Latin translating dictionaries including Spanish-Arabic (1505), Spanish-Nahuatl (1547) and Spanish-Tagalog (1613).

After publishing his dictionaries Nebrija turned his attention to biblical scholarship. He wanted to improve the text and interpretation of the Bible by using the same critical analysis that Italian humanists had applied to classical literature. Around 1504 he fell under the suspicion of Diego de Deza, the Grand Inquisitor of Spain, who confiscated and destroyed his work. In 1507 Cardinal Jiménez de Cisneros succeeded Deza as inquisitor general. Cisneros allowed Nebrija to resume his biblical studies and he eventually published a series of works that used the techniques of humanist scholarship to address problems of biblical translation and interpretation. Nebrija served briefly on the editorial committee assembled by Jiménez to prepare the Complutensian Polyglot Bible. He clashed with the more conservative editors, who resisted his humanist approach to translating the Bible. Jiménez supported the conservative viewpoint and Nebrija's input was largely ignored when the finished work was published in 1517.

Nebrija wrote or translated a large number of other works on a variety of subjects, including theology, law, archaeology, pedagogy, and commentaries on Sedulius and Persius.

Nebrija died on 5 July 1522 in Alcalá de Henares, Spain. His possible grandson Antonio de Lebrija was a conquistador in Colombia and the treasurer of the Spanish conquest of the Muisca expedition.

== Works ==
- Introductiones latinae, 1481
- Gramática de la lengua castellana, 1492
- Diccionario latino-español, 1492
- Vocabulario español-latino, ca. 1495
- Iuris civilis lexicon, 1506
- Artis rhetoricae, 1515
- Reglas de ortografía española, 1517
- Posthumously published Reglas de ortografía en la lengua castellana, 1523
- Dictionarium quadruplex (Alvala, 1532, fol.)
- Quinquagena locorum S. Scripturae non vulgariter enarratorum (Paris, 1520; Basle, 1543)

== Further reading in Spanish ==
- AA. VV. Antonio de Lebrixa Grammatico en su medio milenio, José J. Gómez Asencio (Coord.), Carmen Quijada van Den Berghe (Ed.), Ediciones Universidad de Salamanca, mayo 2022. ISBN 978-84-1311-668-6.
- Gómez Asencio, José J., Nebrija vive, Fundación Antonio de Nebrija, Madrid, 2006. Reeditado en 2022 en una versión ampliada titulada Nebrija vive 500 años después, Fundación Antonio de Nebrija, septiembre 2022. ISBN 978-84-88957-85-6
- Gil, Juan. Antonio de Lebrija. El sabio y el hombre, de Juan Gil Fernández, Athenaica Ediciones, Sevilla, diciembre 2021. ISBN 978-84-18239-45-8
- Jiménez Calvente, Teresa (ed.). NEBRIJA (c.1444-1522). El orgullo de ser gramático Grammaticus nomen est professionis, catálogo de la exposición, comisaria y coord. Teresa Jiménez Calvente, Biblioteca Nacional de España, Acción Cultural Española y Fundación Antonio de Nebrija, Madrid, noviembre 2022. ISBN 978-84-17265-35-9.
- Martín Baños, Pedro. La pasión de saber. Vida de Antonio de Nebrija, prólogo de Francisco Rico, Huelva: Universidad de Huelva, Huelva, 2019. ISBN 978-84-17776-61-9
- Millán, José Antonio. Antonio de Nebrija o el rastro de la verdad, Galaxia Gutenberg, Barcelona, enero 2022. ISBN 978-84-18807-73-2
- Moldes, Diego. Antonio de Nebrija y su origen judeoconverso, Editorial Gedisa, Barcelona, enero 2023. ISBN 978-84-19406-19-4
- Nebrija, Antonio de (2011). Gramática sobre la lengua castellana, Edición, estudio y notas de Carmen Lozano, Paginae Nebrissenses al cuidado de Felipe González Vega, Real Academia Española, Galaxia Gutenberg / Círculo de Lectores, Barcelona, 2011.
- Nebrija, Antonio de (2023). Antonio de Nebrija V Centenario (1522-2022). Volumen I: Pedro Martín Baños, Nueva caracola del bibliófilo nebrisense. Repertorio bibliográfico de la obra impresa y manuscrita de Antonio de Nebrija (siglos XV-XVI). Volumen II: Cultura manuscrita y cultura impresa en el entorno de Antonio de Nebrija, colección de estudios al cuidado de Jacobo Sebastián Sanz Hermida y Pedro Martín Baños, Salamanca: Ediciones Universidad de Salamanca, diciembre 2022 y enero 2023. ISBN (impreso vol. I): 978-84-1311-736-2, ISBN (impreso vol. II): 978-84-1311-737-9, ISBN 978-84-1311-738-6.
- Olmedo, Félix G., Nebrija (1441-1522), Debelador de la barbarie comentador eclesiástico pedagogo - poeta, Editora Nacional, Madrid, 1942.
- Rico, Francisco. Lección y herencia de Elio Antonio de Nebrija, recopilación de ensayos de Francisco Rico, prólogo de Juan Gil, Real Academia Española, Madrid, marzo 2022. ISBN 978-84-88292-13-1
- Riera, Ana. Nebrija. El sabio que amaba las palabras, libro infantil ilustrado, ilustrador: Oscar del Amo, Editorial Planeta y Fundación Antonio de Nebrija, Barcelona, septiembre 2022. ISBN 978-84-08-25855-1

=== Fiction (novels and comics) ===
- Comotto, Agustín. Nebrija, novela gráfica o cómic, Nórdica Libros, Madrid, febrero 2022. ISBN 978-84-18930-55-3
- García Jambrina, Luis. El manuscrito de niebla, novela, editorial Espasa, Madrid, febrero 2022. ISBN 978-84-670-6357-8
- Díaz Pérez, Eva. El sueño del gramático, novela, Fundación José Manuel Lara, Sevilla, marzo 2022. ISBN 978-84-17453-88-6
