= Church of Santa María de Almocóvar, Alcántara =

Church of Santa María de Almocóvar
- Iglesia de Santa María de Almocóvar de Alcántara
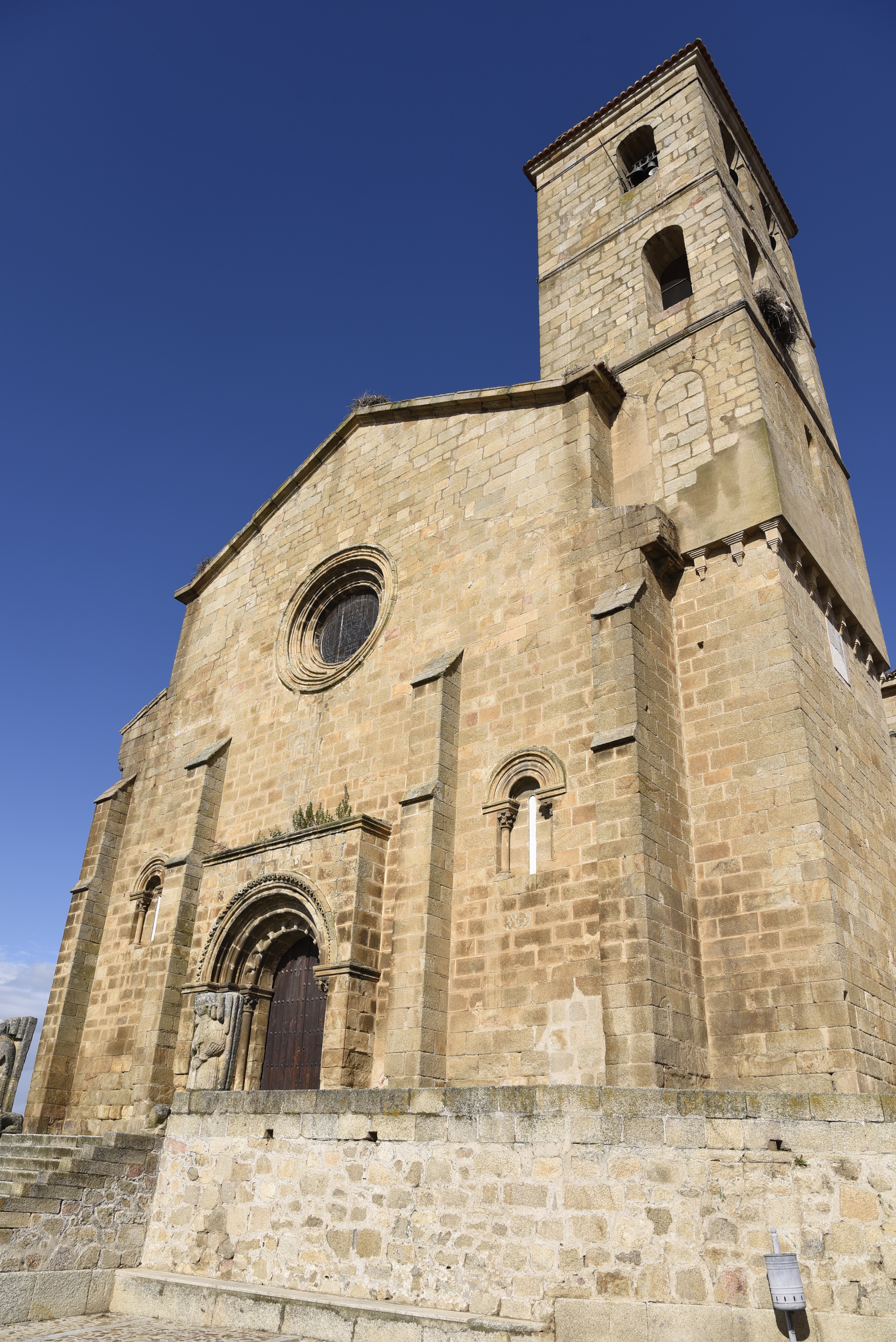
- Church of Santa María de Almocóvar
- 39.720424°N 6.887446°W
- Location: Alcántara, province of Cáceres, Extremadura
- Country: Spain
- Denomination: Catholic
- Sui iuris church: Latin Church

History
- Status: Parochial
- Founder: Order of Alcántara
- Dedication: Santa María

Architecture
- Style: primarily Baroque with Romanesque elements
- Groundbreaking: 1254
- Completed: 1281

Specifications
- Length: approximately 40 m
- Width: approximately 16 m
- Materials: The main material used is stone

Administration
- Diocese: Coria-Cáceres

Spanish Cultural Heritage
- Designated: 8 May 1987
- Reference no.: RI-51-0005011

The Church of Santa María de Almocóvar is a 13th-century parochial Catholic church located in the Spanish town of Alcántara, in the province of Cáceres. The church is located in the center of the Spanish plaza, in the old town.

== History ==
During the el Andalusian period, the town's mosque was established here. After the Reconquista in 1213 it was converted into a church. In 1254, the Order of Alcántara decided to demolish the building and begin construction of a new church, of which some Romanesque elements are still preserved. The current church, which is primarily Baroque in style, with significant renovations carried out between the 16th and 18th centuries.

== Heritage site designation ==
In 1987, the church was declared a Bien de Interés Cultural, a category of the heritage register in Spain.

== See also ==
- Alcántara
- Province of Cáceres
- Convent of San Benito de Alcántara
- Order of Alcántara

== Gallery ==
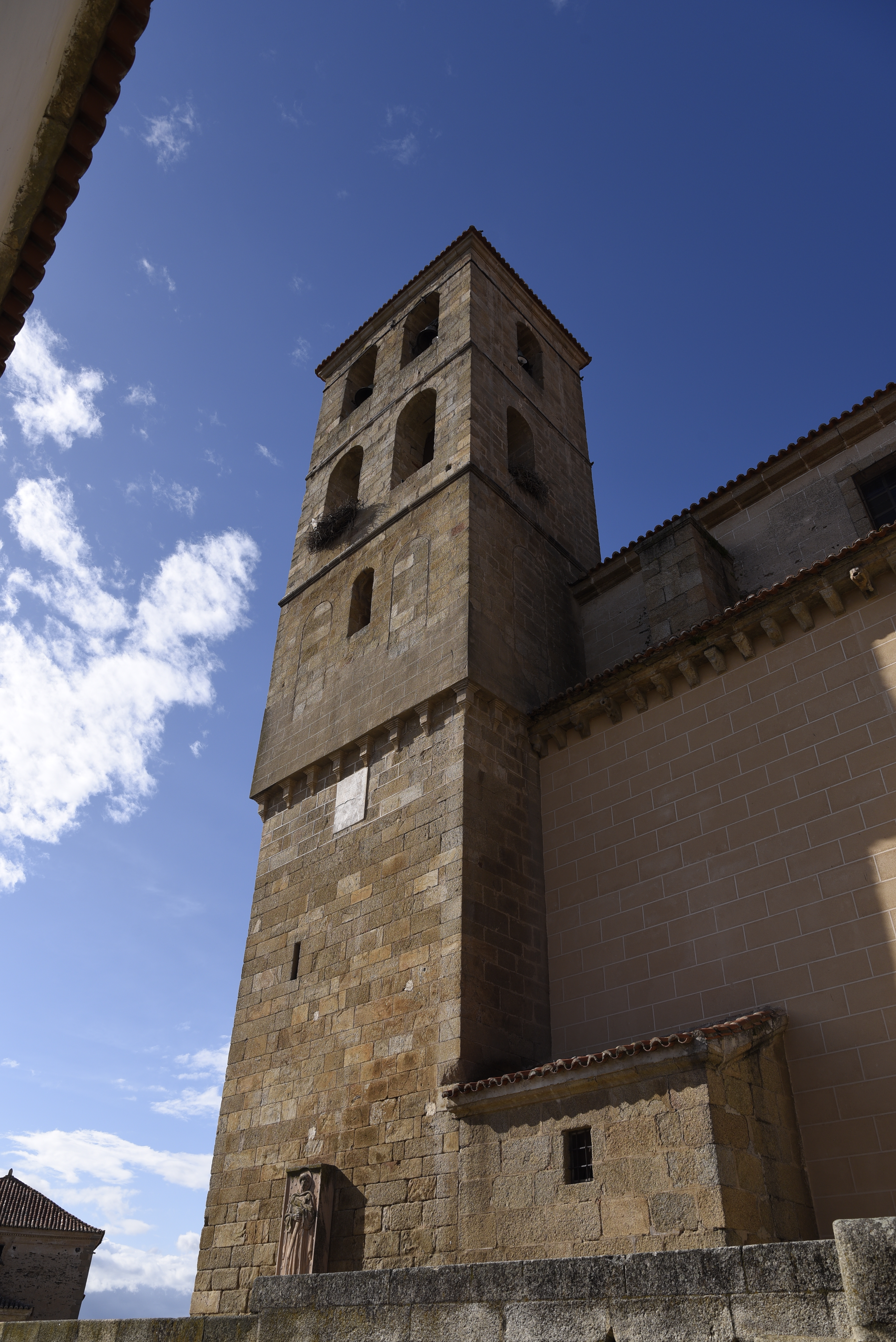
The square bell tower, with round-arched windows in pairs on the upper levels, and blind arches.

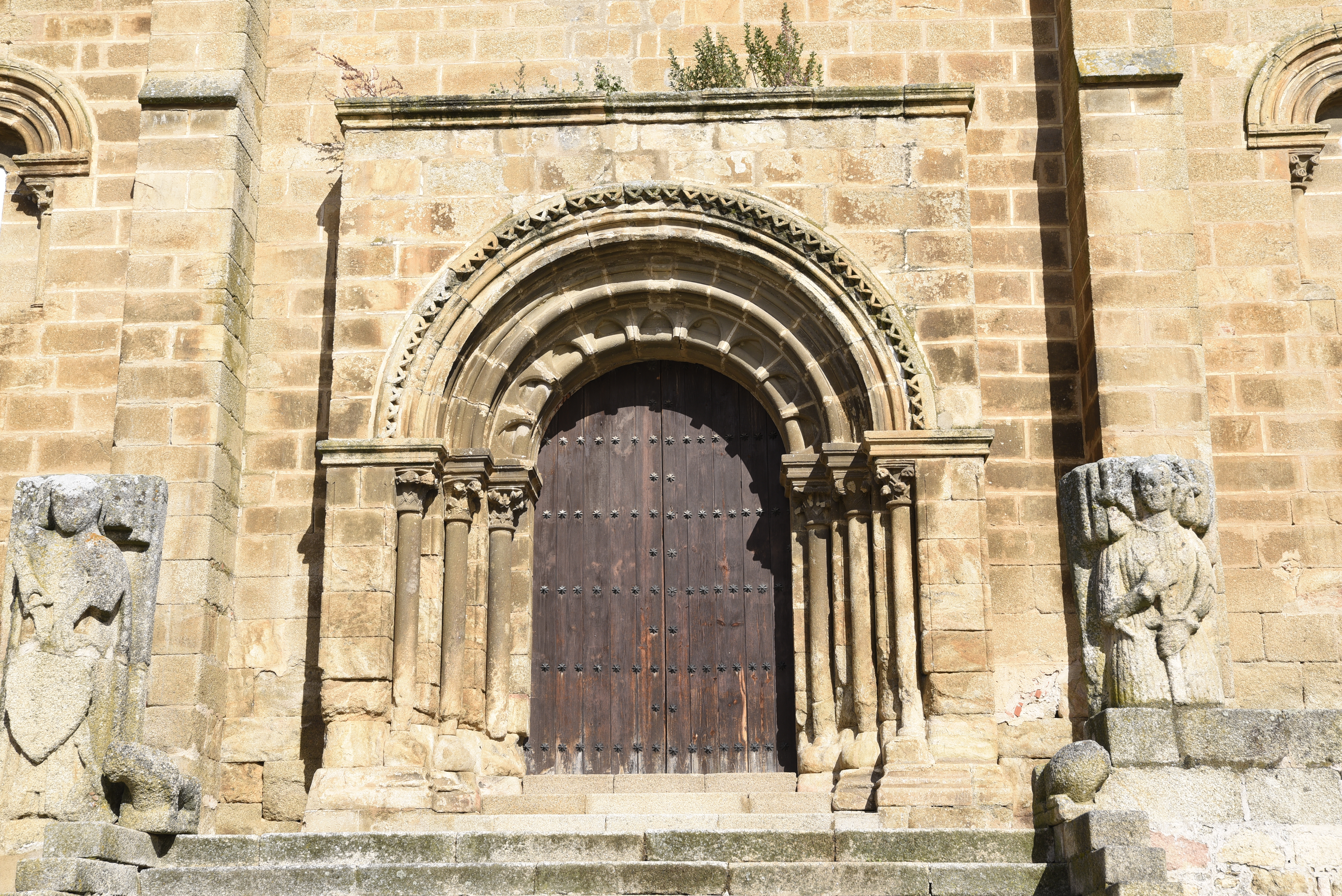
Main door (portal) in Romanesque style, with rounded archivolts

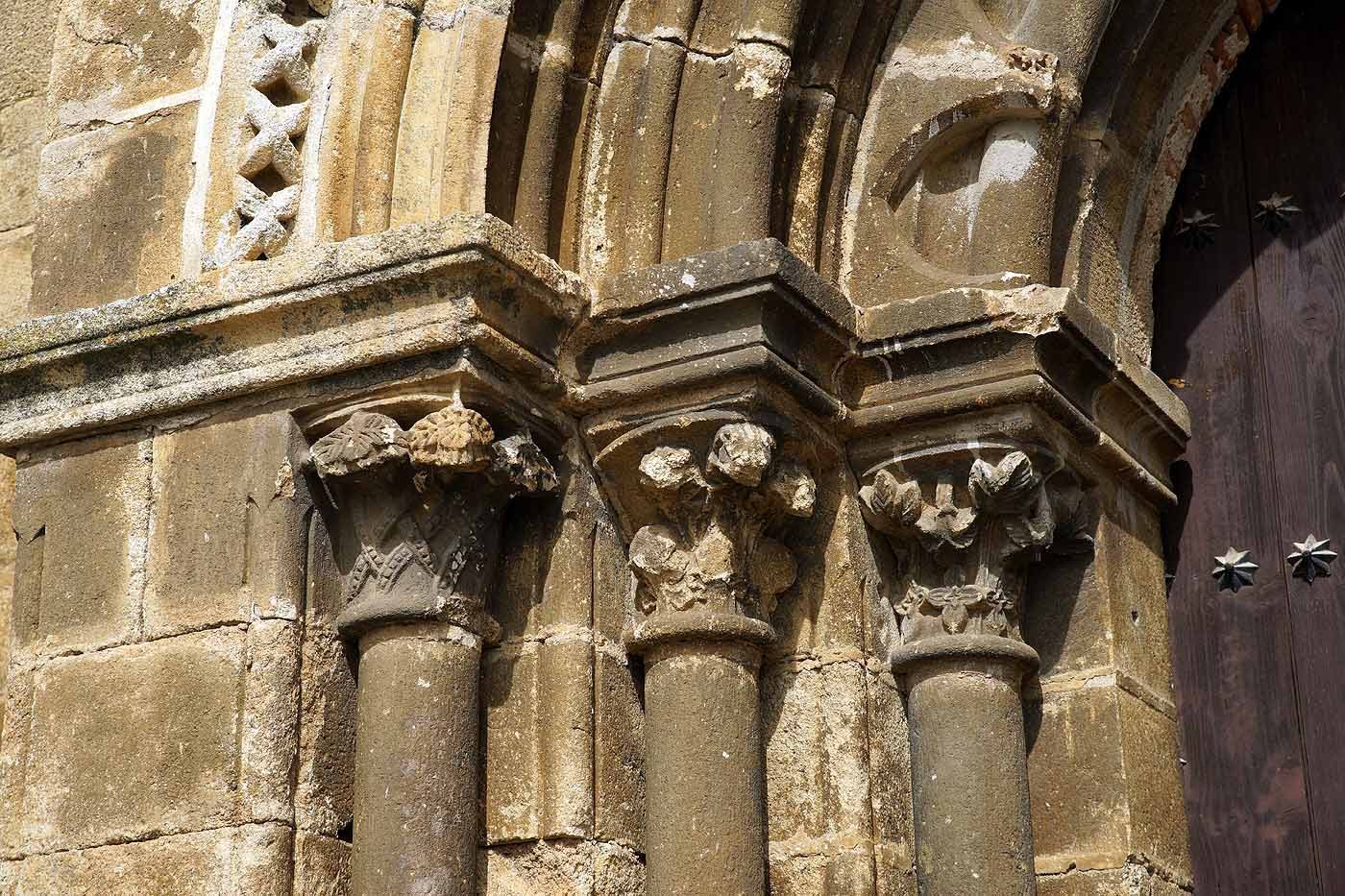
Detail from the portal. Repeating jamb columns serving as dynamic structural and decorative elements.

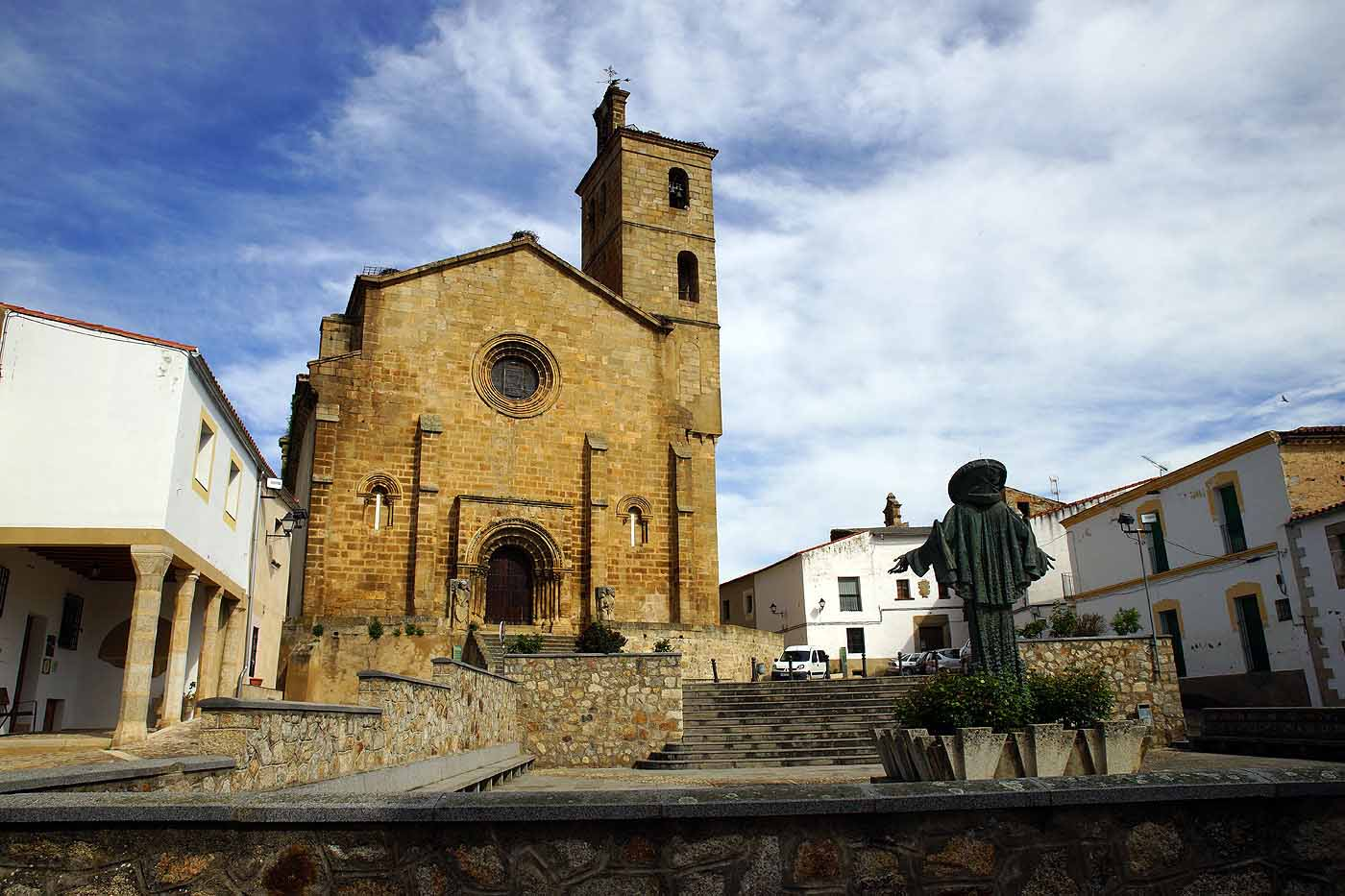
View from the plaza, facing west. A statue of Saint Peter of Alcántara in the foreground.
