= Chiviri =

Festival in Trujillo, Cáceres, Spain

The chíviri is a popular festival which takes place in the Spanish town of Trujillo. It started in the beginning of the 19th century as the culmination of Easter, on Resurrection Sunday. The main square became a meeting point for people dressed in typical regional costume who sing, dance, eat and drink to the beat of popular songs. The following Monday is a holiday in the city (Easter Monday). On this day it is traditional for celebrants to find a place in the countryside to partake in a picnic.

== Activities ==
The festival begins at dawn on Easter Saturday and finishes the next day. At twelve o'clock, an orchestra plays in the Main Square of Trujillo popular tunes (see detail in songs). Over 15,000 people attend. Some are dressed in costumes akin of the city; others don a red neck scarf dancing and singing to the rhythm of these songs. At the same time, there are people who drink in the Square, since this is the one day that public drinking is permissible. The festival lasts all night and, after the spectacle in the Plaza Mayor, people move to the pubs and clubs of the city. On Sunday the festival continues on the Plaza Mayor until the evening, when takes place the International Folklore Festival (a concert of folk music).

== Songs ==
The songs in Chíviri are mostly based on the works of the Trujillian poet Gregorio Rubio Mariño, popularly known as Goro, between 1917 and 1936, and were composed initially for Carnival.

An example:

Trujillo in Easter, I do not know what it resembles,

oh, chiviri, chiviri, chiviri, oh, chiviri, chiviri, Chon.

The outsiders come and gatecrash just like fish,

oh, chiviri, chiviri, chiviri, oh, chiviri, chiviri, Chon.

Gregorio Rubio Mariño

== Image ==
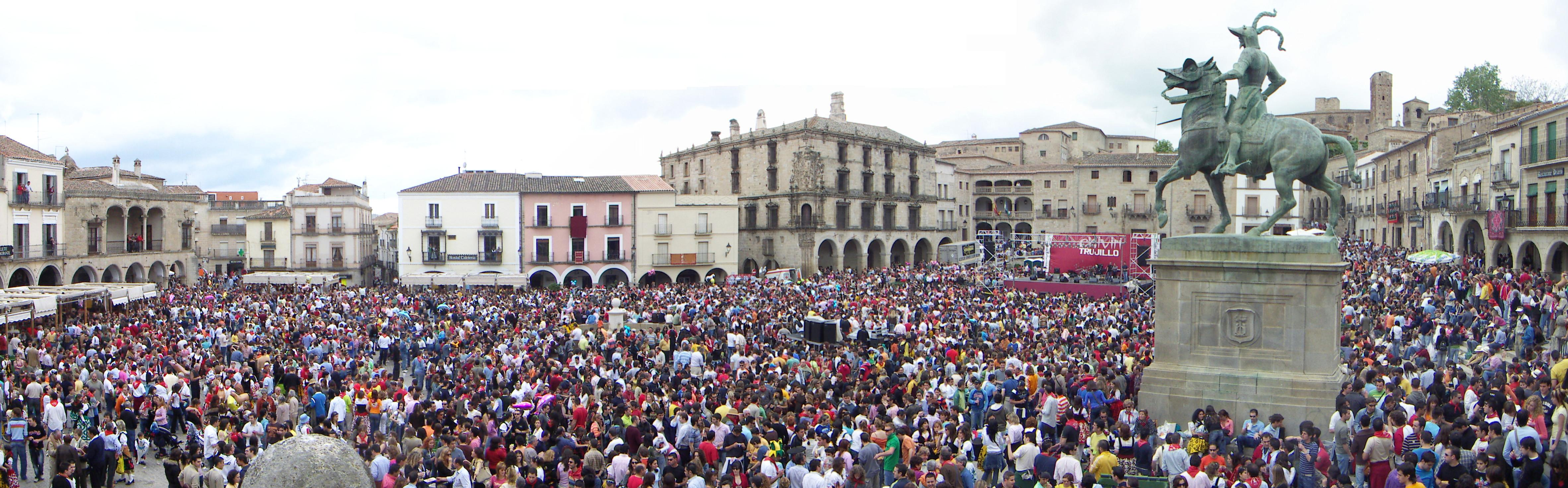
