= Trujillo, Spain =

Trujillo
- Municipality
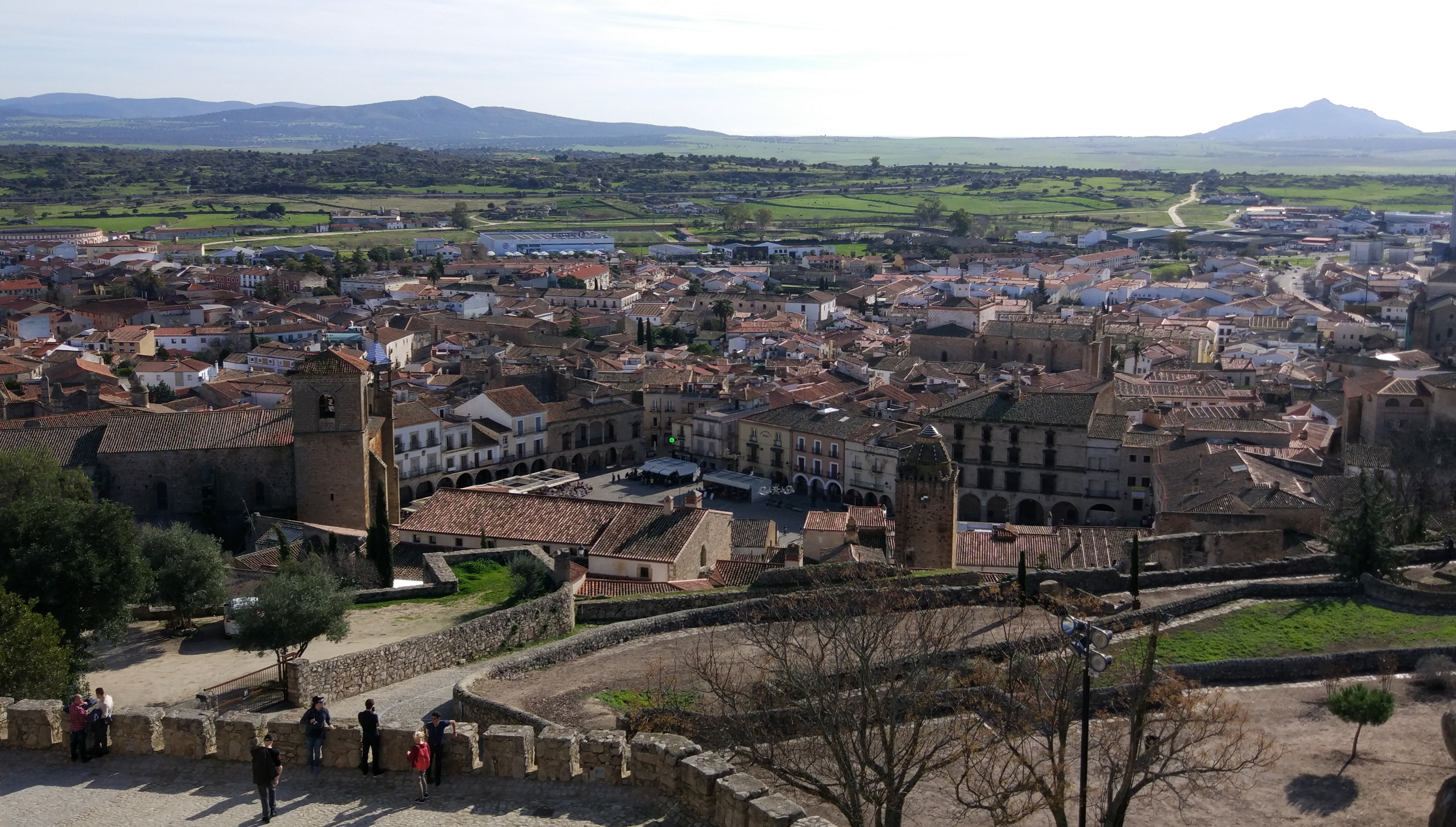

- Coat of arms
- Location of Trujillo
- Coordinates: 39°27′55″N 5°52′44″W
- Country: Spain
- Autonomous Community: Extremadura
- Province: Cáceres

Government
  - Mayor: María Inés Rubio Diaz (PP)

Area
  - Total: 649.53 km^{2} (250.78 sq mi)
- Elevation (AMSL): 564 m (1,850 ft)

Population (2025-01-01)
  - Total: 8,611
  - Density: 13.26/km^{2} (34.34/sq mi)
- Time zone: UTC+1 (CET)
  - Summer (DST): UTC+2 (CEST (GMT +2))
- Postal code: 10200
- Area code: +34 (Spain) + 927 (Cáceres)
- Website: www.trujillo.es

Trujillo (Spanish: [tɾuˈxiʎo]) is a municipality located in the Province of Cáceres in the autonomous community of Extremadura. In 2013 the municipality had 9,086 inhabitants (INE Census, 2013).

Originally settled on a granite knoll, which was readily fortified, Trujillo now extends to the southeast of its original site. Likewise, it lies on the A-5 road route connecting central Spain with the Portuguese border. The old town contains many medieval and renaissance buildings.

It hosts the national cheese festival in early May.

== History ==
=== Antiquity ===
Trujillo is identified with the Roman Turgalium, which became a prefecture of Emerita Augusta. Regardless of whether there was a previous indigenous settlement or not, Romans developed Turgalium seeking to alter pre-existing economic and trade networks and draw indigenous populations from the surroundings together.

=== Middle Ages ===
Following the Islamic conquest after 711, Trujillo became one of the main towns in the region (known as ترغالة Targhālah in Arabic). This taifa was subject to the Umayyad Emirate and the subsequent Caliphate ruled until the middle of the 11th century. During this time the ethnic tensions between Berbers and Arabs weakened the Caliphate militarily.

Following the seizure of a large part of the territory of the former Taifa of Toledo by the Almoravids from Alfonso VI, Trujillo became a site from where Almoravid razzias were launched against the land of Talavera in the early 12th century.

During the time of Almohad rule, wars with Portugal, Castile and León guaranteed that the possession of Trujillo was tenuous. Rule alternated between these kingdoms and the Almohads, returning for the last time to the Muslims in 1195. Between 1188 and 1195 it was the headquarters of the military order of Trujillo.

In the Spring of 1196, with help from the Kingdom of León, Almohads raided the Tagus valley and occupied Santa Cruz and Trujillo, which had been previously left forsaken by the order of Trujillo.

An army formed by forces of the military orders and the Bishop of Plasencia laid siege to Trujillo with the support of Ferdinand III. Ibn Hud tried to relieve the town but was driven off by the besieging army.

The town was finally captured on 25 January 1232. During the final assault, according to the local legend, the Christian forces were faltering just short of victory when many reported seeing the Virgin Mary (known as Virgen de la Victoria in Spanish, or the Virgin Mary of Victory) between the two towers, or Arco del Triunfo, in the castle. Sufficiently inspired, Christian troops pressed on and achieved victory, defeating the Muslims, who were inside.

Together with Plasencia, Cáceres and Coria, Trujillo was one of the few major realengo (royal demesne) towns in the region, where otherwise maestrazgo lands tended to prevail.

Alfonso X granted Trujillo a fuero in 1256.

John II conferred on Trujillo the status of city (ciudad) in 1430 by means of a privilegio rodado. The crown also granted Trujillo a weekly market privilege in 1465. Trujillo sustained intense population growth in the second half of the 15th century. Trujillo hosted a sizeable and economically prosperous morería (Mudéjar community), with an aljama of up to four hundred people by the late 15th century. Likewise, the judería (Jewish community) had its own synagogue, traces of which have been identified archaeologically. In 1491, a dispute within the community over alterations to the synagogue was brought before Abraham Senior, rab de la corte, who ruled against the changes; Senior himself also owned property in Trujillo. After the expulsion of the Jews from Castile a year later, the synagogue was transferred by the Crown to local religious institutions and ultimately to the convent of Santa Isabel, while tombstones from the Jewish cemetery were granted to the monastery of Santa María de la Encarnación.

Trujillo managed to avoid becoming a lordship, but in 1475 it lost the villages of Logrosán, Garciaz, Cañamero, Acedera, Navalvillar and Zorita, which became part of a lordship under Gutierre Álvarez de Toledo. Political life and council member posts in the late middle ages were brokered among an urban oligarchy formed by the lineages of the Altamiranos, the Bejaranos, and the Añasco. Social inequality was prominent by the late 15th century, and begging and poverty were an issue at the time.

=== Modern era ===
The free market, revoked under the Catholic Monarchs, was confirmed in 1524, as a gesture for Trujillo's siding with the Emperor during the Comuneros revolt. Demographic growth and enrichment of certain milieus from colonial activity in the Americas fostered urban development and renewal in the 16th century, decisively favouring the expansion of the city beyond the walls.

After 1595 the city experienced the arrival of a number of forcibly relocated 'new moriscos' banished from Granada. From 1610 to 1611, about 130 morisco families (590 individuals) were reportedly expelled from Trujillo, although the permanence of a number of 'old moriscos', who enjoyed support from the local society, remained a cause of concern.

A local sociedad económica de los amigos del país was created in Trujillo in 1787, but it only lasted until 1802.

During the Peninsular War, French military occupation depleted the city and its hinterland from resources, particularly from June to September 1811, placing the territory under a dire economic and social plight.

In 1834, the city became the official headquarters of the Judicial District of Trujillo. In the census of 1842, it had 110 households and 6026 residents.

== Geography ==
Trujillo lies on a craggy landscape. The large territory of the municipality includes the Almonte (conforming the municipal northern boundary), the Tozo, and the Magasca rivers, among others. As in many towns in Extremadura, Trujillo's old buildings provide homes for a breeding population of storks. Other birds of interest include the Lesser kestrel, which nests in the bull-ring and other urban sites.

Trujillo has a hot-summer Mediterranean climate, type Csa, in the modified Köppen classification.

Climate data for Trujillo (data for 1961–2001)
Month	Jan	Feb	Mar	Apr	May	Jun	Jul	Aug	Sep	Oct	Nov	Dec	Year
Daily mean °C (°F)	7.2 (45.0)	8.7 (47.7)	11.5 (52.7)	13.6 (56.5)	17.7 (63.9)	22.6 (72.7)	26.5 (79.7)	26.2 (79.2)	22.5 (72.5)	16.6 (61.9)	11.0 (51.8)	7.6 (45.7)	16.0 (60.8)
Average precipitation mm (inches)	67.9 (2.67)	70.4 (2.77)	51.1 (2.01)	60.6 (2.39)	51.4 (2.02)	33.0 (1.30)	6.8 (0.27)	9.6 (0.38)	39.7 (1.56)	64.6 (2.54)	86.3 (3.40)	81.6 (3.21)	623.1 (24.53)
Source: Ministerio de Agricultura, Alimentación y Medio Ambiente. Datos de precipitación y de temperatura para el periodo 1961–2001 en Trujillo.

== Monuments ==
Trujillo has a rich heritage. Among the most important monuments are the Castle (Alcazaba), the church of Santiago, the church of Santa María la Mayor, the church of San Francisco, the Church of San Martín, the Plaza Mayor, and renaissance palaces such as the palace of the Marquis of the Conquest, the palace of the Orellana-Pizarro family, the palace of the Duques de San Carlos, Marquesado de Piedras Albas, the house of the strong Altamirano, Palace Chaves (Luis Chaves Old), and of course the walled old town. The Plaza Mayor features a large equestrian statue of the conquistador, Francisco Pizarro, a native son of Trujillo, by the American sculptor Charles Rumsey.

The Palacio de Piedras Albas was built circa 1530 by Don Pedro Suárez de Toledo, formerly owned by the family of the conquistador and explorer Francisco de Orellana, the Marqueses de Orellana and later by the Marqueses de San Juan de Piedras Albas.

The city has several museums, including the Museum of Coria (Javier Salas Foundation), Pizarro's House, Enrique Elías Museum (local designer), and the Museum of Cheese and Wine.

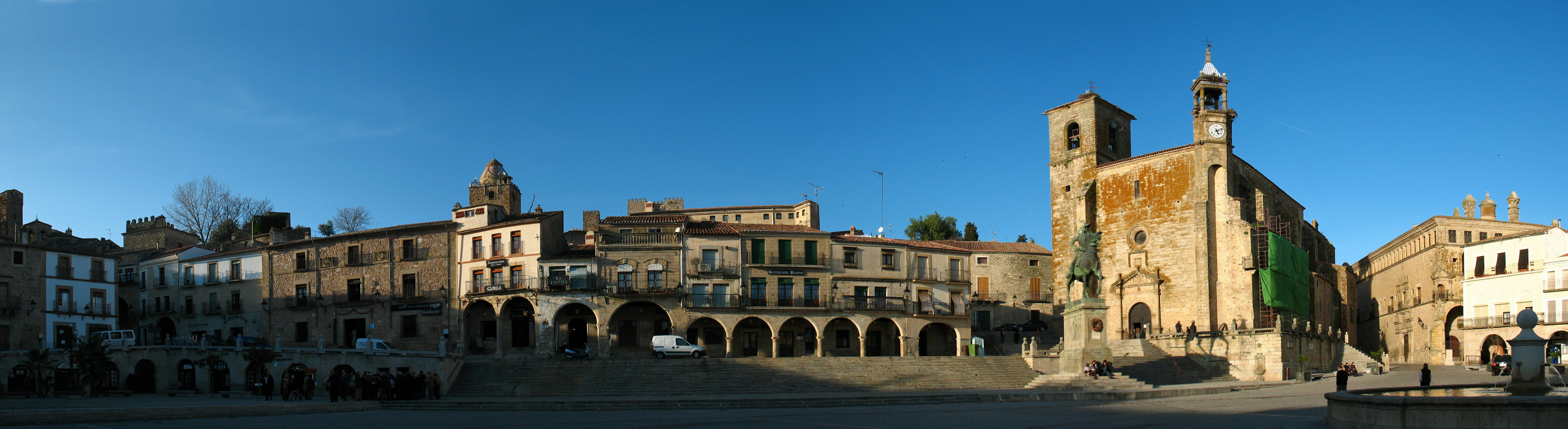
Panorama of the Plaza Mayor.

== Events ==
=== The Chiviri ===
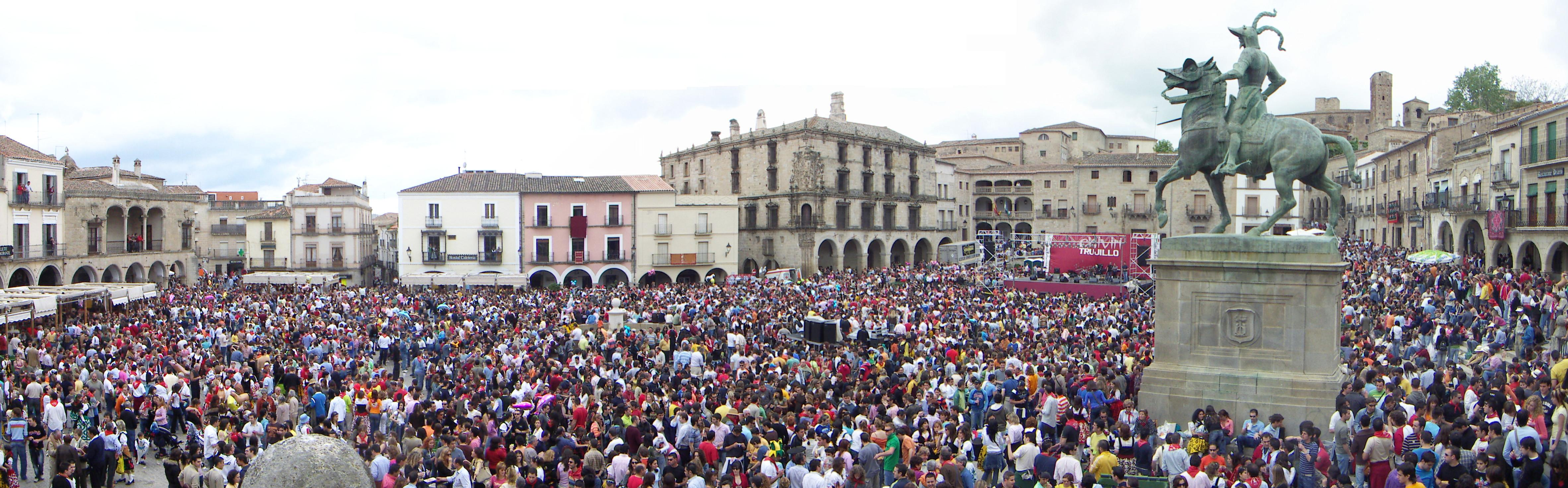
The Plaza Mayor during the Chíviri.

The culmination of Holy Week is celebrated on Easter Sunday (declared an event of regional interest). The town square is full of people dressed in local costumes. They sing, dance, eat and drink to the beat of Chíviri. The following day, Easter Monday, is a holiday in the city and locals have the custom of going to the countryside for picnics.

=== National Cheese Fair ===
On 1 May, the National Cheese Fair takes place, which is the most important cheese competition in Spain. The Plaza Mayor becomes a huge fair where it is possible to taste cheeses from around Spain. This festival draws a large crowd, with organizers reporting that approximately 100,000 people attend on a yearly basis.

=== Festivities in honour of Virgen de la Victoria ===
They take place at the end of August or in early September. During the festival the Virgen de la Victoria (Our Lady of Victory) is moved from her normal place in the chapel of the Castle to the church of San Martín, in the Plaza Mayor, where the religious events are celebrated. In addition, there are puppets (The Adventures of Peneque el Valiente (Peneque the brave) with Miguel Pino), capeas and the Festival of Music, Dance and Theatre in the Castle. Also a local teenager is elected as "Queen of the festivities" and she has her own entourage.

== In popular culture ==
- Part of the seventh season of Game of Thrones was shot in the province of Trujillo, including the Trujillo Castle as Casterly Rock spots.
- The Trujillo Castle was also used in the second season of House of the Dragon for the King's Landing background or general Westerlands scenes.

== Twin towns – sister cities ==
Trujillo is twinned with:

- Almagro, Spain
- Batalha, Portugal
- Castegnato, Italy
- Piura, Peru
- Santa Fe de Antioquia, Colombia
- Trujillo, Honduras
- Trujillo, Peru

== Heritage ==
The city of Trujillo, together with Plasencia, Monfragüe National Park and the Extremaduran dehesa, sought designation as a UNESCO World Heritage Site. In October 2008, the National Historical Heritage Council included the joint candidacy on Spain's tentative list, a preliminary step before its formal presentation to UNESCO. The proposal had been put forward by the town councils of Plasencia and Trujillo, and the regional government supported it and presented it at a council meeting in La Rioja.

== See also ==
- List of municipalities in Cáceres
