= Juan de Zúñiga y Pimentel =

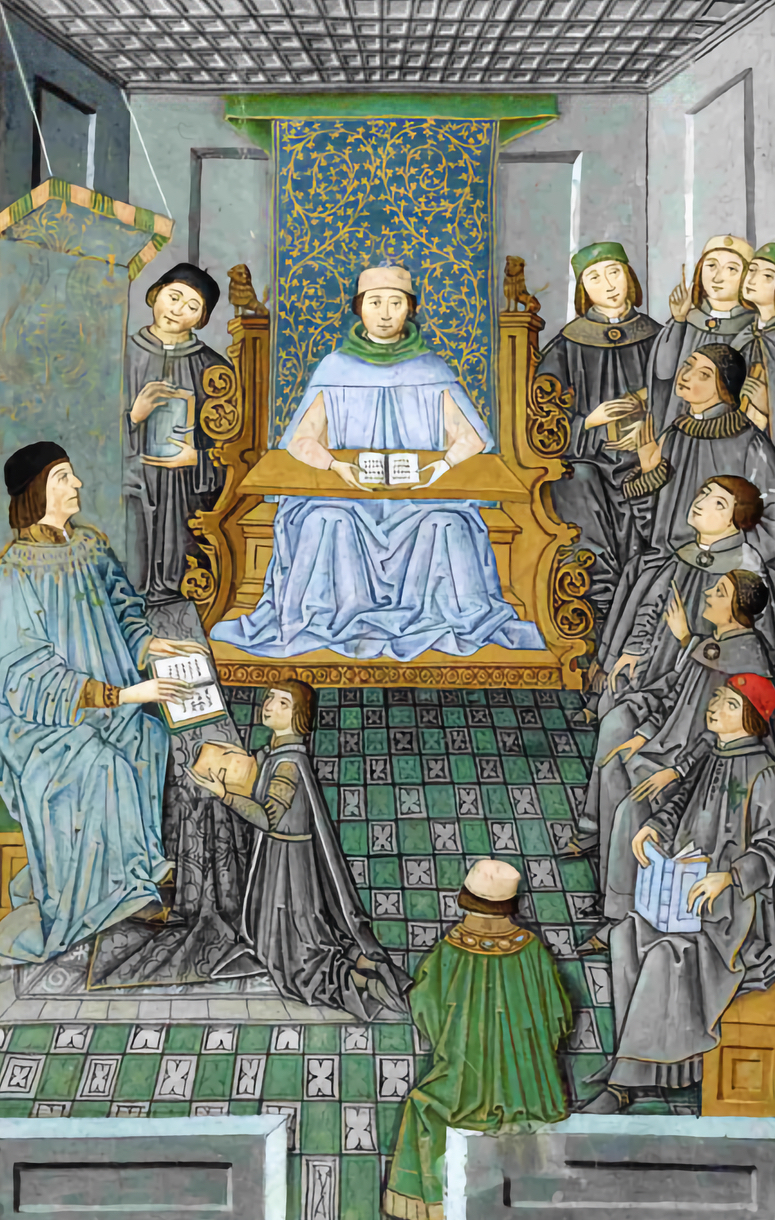
Antonio de Nebrija teaching a class on grammar in the presence of Juan de Zúñiga y Pimentel. Introducciones Latinae, 1486

Juan de Zúñiga y Pimentel (1465–1504) was a Spanish Roman Catholic bishop and cardinal.

== Biography ==
A member of the House of Zúñiga, Juan de Zúñiga y Pimentel was born in Béjar in 1465, the son of Álvaro de Zúñiga, duke of Plasencia, and Leonor de Pimentel, duchess of Arévalo.

At a young age, he took an interest in arms. On January 23, 1475, he became Grand Master of the Order of Alcántara. With the Reconquista of the Emirate of Granada ongoing, he participated in the sieges of Málaga, Baeza, and Granada.

On November 20, 1494, he resigned as Grand Master of the Order of Alcántara and retired to Villanueva de la Serena where he had a monastery built and lived with other former knights following the Rule of Saint Benedict. At the monastery, he studied under the direction of Antonio de Nebrija, who taught him Latin; Gutierre de Trejo, who taught him law; and Fr. Domingo, who taught him Christian theology. During this period, he acquired a prebend at Burgos Cathedral.

In 1502, the Catholic Monarchs named him Archbishop of Seville; after he accepted, he was elected as archbishop on May 5, 1503. He entered the diocese in June 1504 and occupied the see until his death.

At the insistence of the Catholic Monarchs, Pope Julius II made him a cardinal priest in the consistory of November 29, 1503. He received the titular church of Santi Nereo e Achilleo on December 6, 1503; the red hat was sent to him with a papal bull on February 24, 1504.

On July 17, 1504, he left Seville for the court, but fell ill on his journey. He died at the monastery of Santa María de Guadalupe in the Province of Cáceres on July 26, 1504. He was initially buried in that monastery, but in 1533, his remains were transferred to the monastery of San Vicente de Ferrer, Plasencia, a monastery that had been founded by his mother.
