= Order of Truxillo =

Spanish military brotherhood

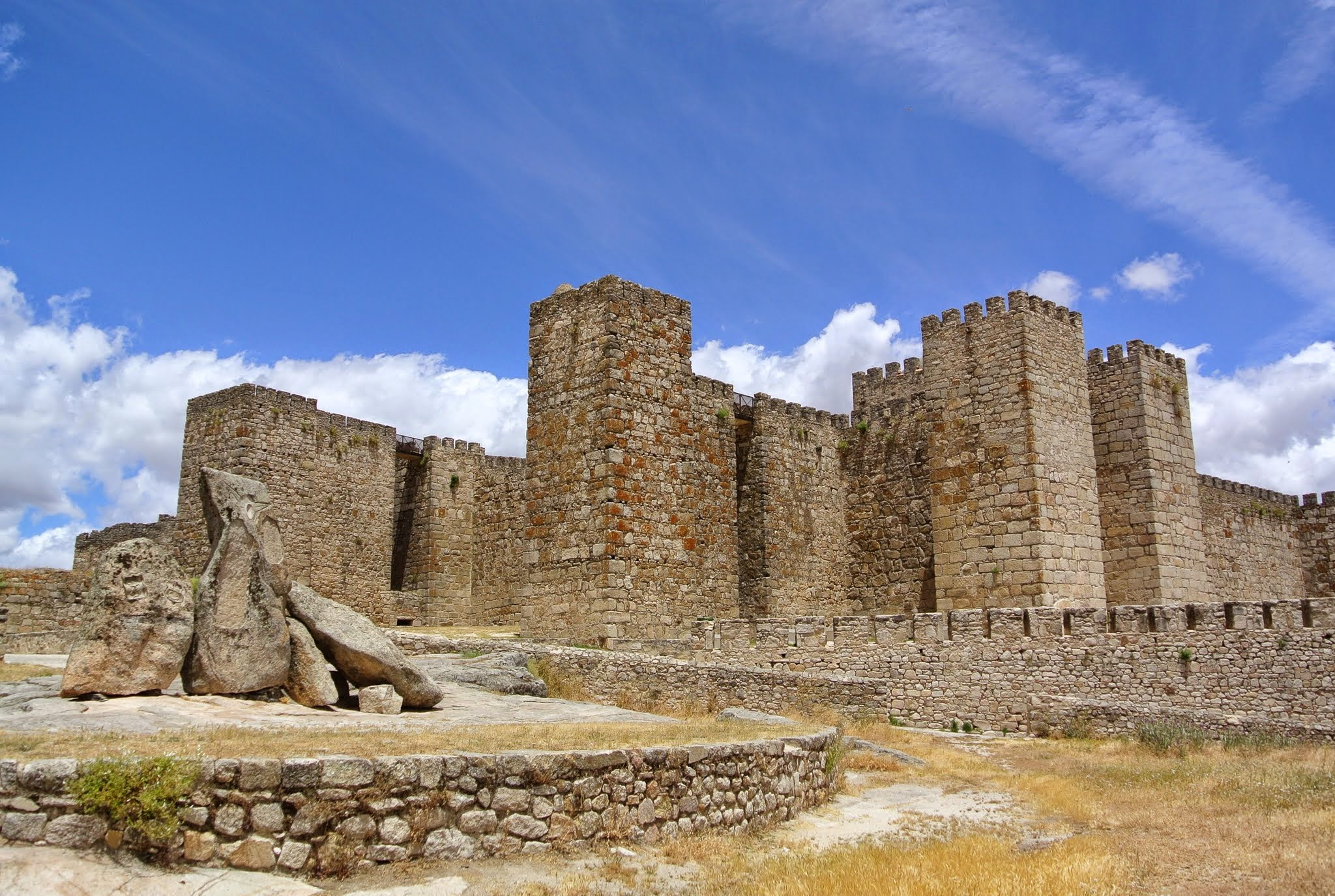
Castle of Trujillo

The Order of Truxillo (or Trujillo) was a short-lived military brotherhood based at the castle of Truxillo in the kingdom of Castile. Truxillo lay 25 miles (40 km) east of Cáceres in the Kingdom of León, where the Order of Santiago was founded in 1170.

The order's origins are obscure. It was incorporated into the Leonese Order of San Julián del Pereiro before 1188. Its master, between 1188 and 1193, was a certain Gómez, possibly the same person as the master of San Julián. In 1188, the order received Ronda as a possession but not under its lordship. In 1195, Truxillo was captured by the Almohads. The order soon ceased to exist, its possessions (including Ronda) being absorbed by the Castilian Order of Calatrava. Sometime between 1207 and 1221, Ronda came under the control of the Order of the Temple. The Order of San Julián, thus deprived of its foothold in Castile, was compensated for its loss of the Order of Truxillo and its possessions by King Ferdinand III, who united León and Castile in 1230.

== Sources ==
- Conedera, Sam Zeno (2015). Ecclesiastical Knights: The Military Orders in Castile, 1150–1330. Fordham University Press. ISBN 978-0-8232-6597-8. OCLC 906575144.
- Novoa Portela, Feliciano (2014). "La Orden de Trujillo y los reinos de León y Castilla (1188–1195)". Hidalguía: La revista de genealogía, nobleza y armas (366): 655–670.
- O'Callaghan, Joseph F. (1962). "The Foundation of the Order of Alcántara, 1176–1218". The Catholic Historical Review. 4 (4): 471–486.
- O'Callaghan, Joseph F. (2003). Reconquest and Crusade in Medieval Spain. University of Pennsylvania Press.
- Ruiz Moreno, Manuel Jesús (2009). "La enseña de los freires truxillenses y la Vera Cruz" (PDF). XXXVII Coloquios Históricos de Extremadura: dedicados a la Guerra de la Independencia en Extremadura: Trujillo del 22 al 28 de septiembre de 2008. Vol. 2, pp. 727–760. ISBN 978-84-692-4898-0.
