= Alcántara =

- Municipality
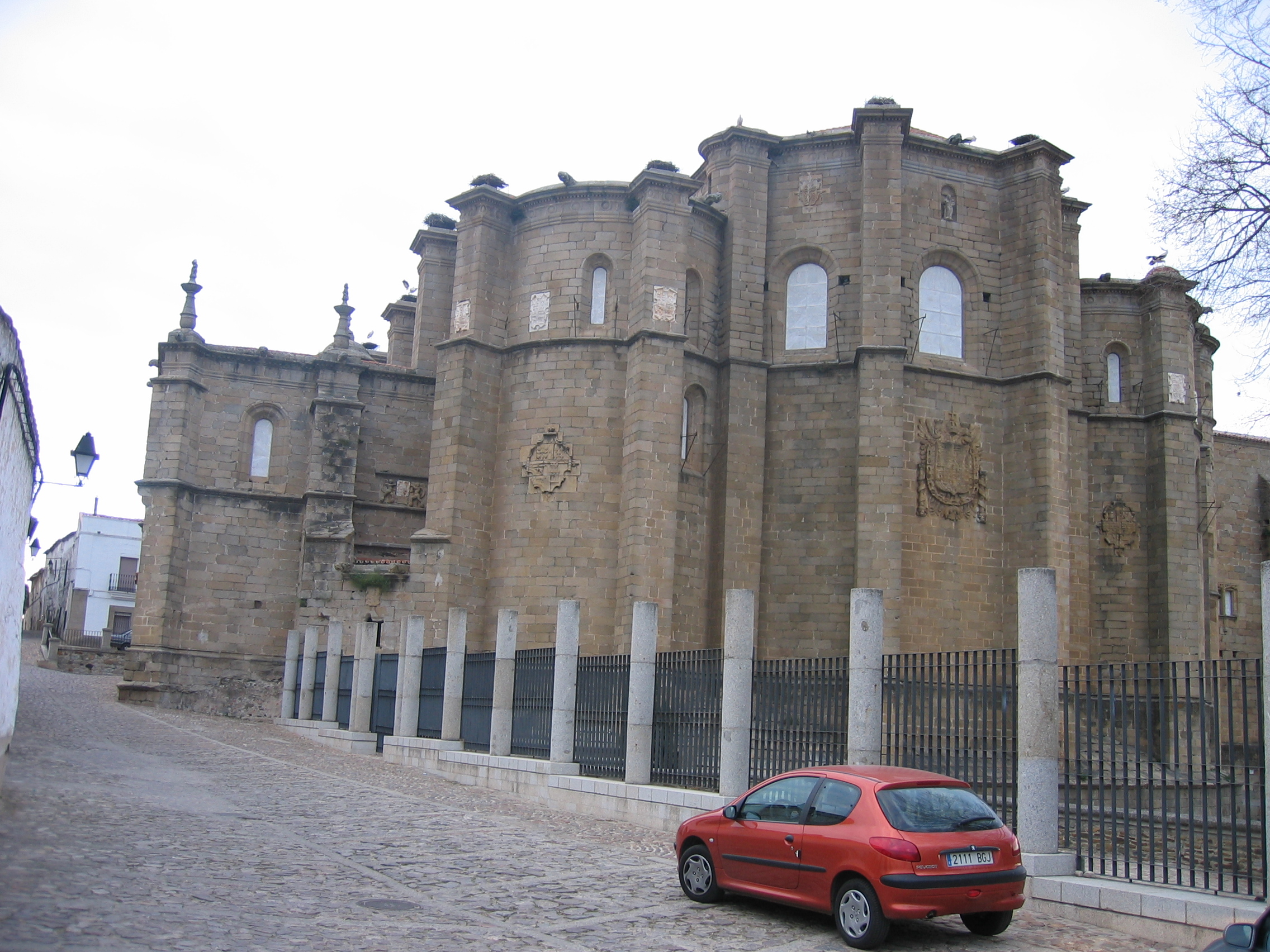
- Convent of San Benito de Alcántara (16th century).

- Coat of arms

- Location in Spain
- Coordinates: 39°43′20″N 6°53′23″W
- Country: Spain
- Community: Extremadura
- Province: Cáceres
- Comarca: Tierra de Alcántara

Government
  - Mayor: Luis Mario Muñoz Nieto

Area
  - Total: 552 km^{2} (213 sq mi)
- Elevation: 291 m (955 ft)

Population (2025-01-01)
  - Total: 1,329
  - Density: 2.41/km^{2} (6.24/sq mi)
- Demonym: Alcantareños
- Time zone: CET
- Postal code: 10980
- Website: Official website

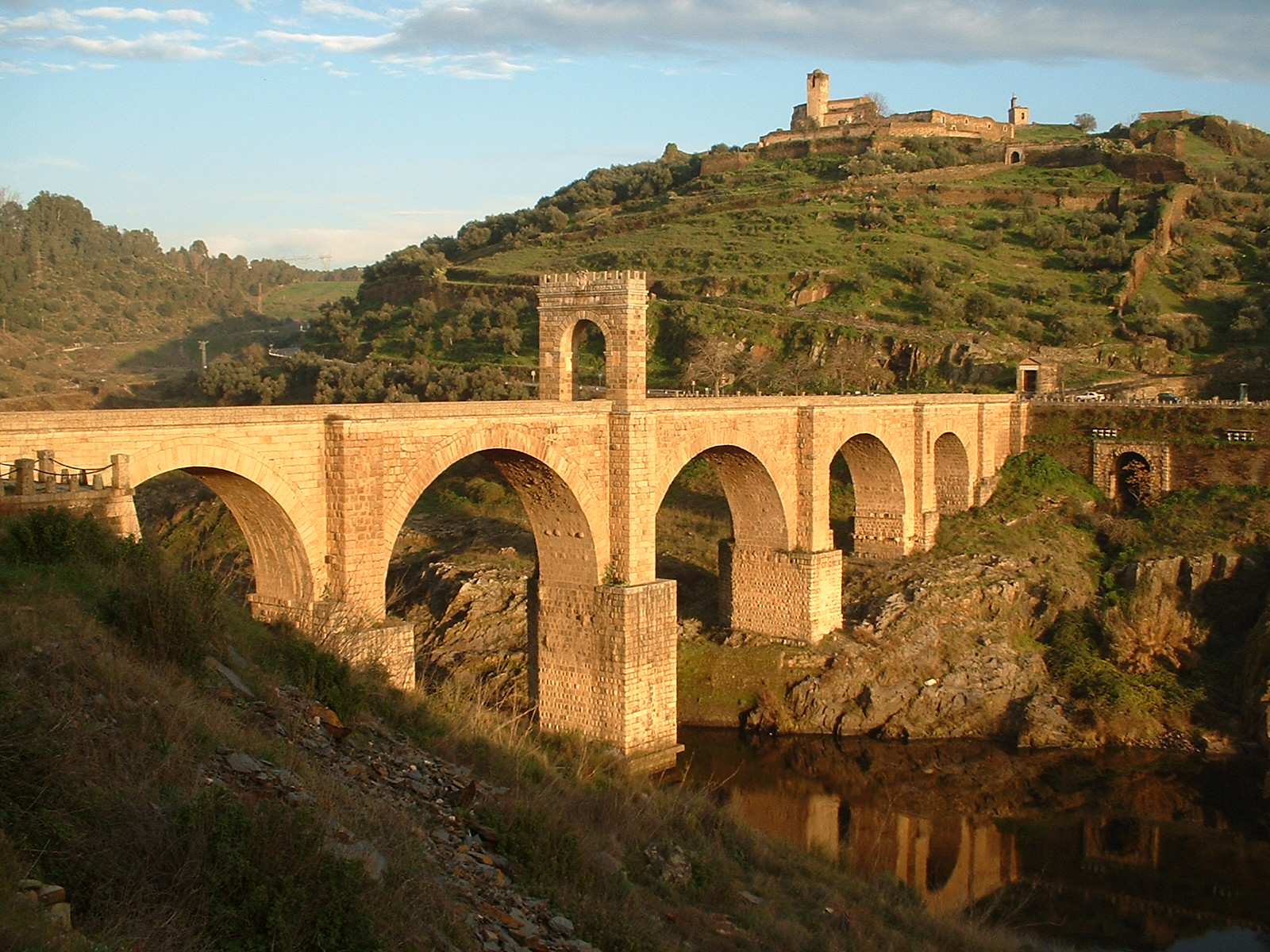
The Alcántara Bridge.

Alcántara (Spanish: [alˈkan.ta.ɾa]) is a municipality in the province of Cáceres, Extremadura, Spain, on the Tagus, near Portugal. The toponym is from the Arabic word al-Qanṭarah (القنطرة) meaning "the bridge".

== History ==
Archaeological findings have attested human presence in the area from the Bronze Age; the first historical inhabitants were the Lusitanians, followed by the Celts, who came from an area between central Iberia and the Pyrenees. To this period, and to the following Roman domination, belong the remains of several castra (military camps), villas and the bridge which gives its name to the city. Roman rule lasted from the 2nd century BC to the 5th century, when they were replaced by the Visigoths.

In the 8th century, the Moors conquered the Iberian Peninsula and called it Al-Andalus, ending four centuries of Visigothic presence in what is now Spain, France, Portugal and Gibraltar. In the 12th century, the Muslim geographer al-Idrisi described the bridge as one of the wonders of the world. Alcántara was a frontier city in the 12th and 13th centuries, devoted to military activities and animal husbandry. After the collapse of the Caliphate of Córdoba, it belonged to several Islamic taifas (petty kingdoms).

Ferdinand II of León liberated Alcántara in 1167 during his wars against Portugal, but the town was later recaptured by the Almohads. The Christians conquered it permanently in 1213 with Alfonso IX of León. In 1217 it was given to the military order of Calatrava. They, however, considered it too difficult to defend, and thus the following year they were replaced by the Order of San Julian de Pereiro, a military order created in 1156 which had its headquarters on the Rio Cora and which later took its name from Alcántara, where it was established. The city maintained its strategic importance until 1655. In 1807, during the Peninsular War, it was occupied by French troops.

Alcántara lost all its importance in the 19th century when the order's properties were secularized. Its depopulation was halted only in the 1960s, when the electric company Hidroelectrica Espaňola built several plants here. However, its economy was not boosted, and the town is still part of one of the less developed areas of Spain.

The Order of Alcántara, a religious and military order, was established in the town in 1176 for defence against the Moors, and was suppressed in 1835.

In 1499, Peter of Alcántara, teacher of Theresa of Ávila, saint and Franciscan reformer, was born here.

== Main sights ==
- Alcántara Bridge, of six symmetrical arches, 194 m long and 71 m high, built in honour of Trajan in 103-106. An inscription gives the name of the architect of the viaduct, C. Iulius Lacer.
- Convent of San Benito de Alcántara (16th century)
- Church of Santa María de Almocóvar, Alcántara (13th century)
- Remains of the Moorish walls, modified and restored in the Middle Ages
- Convent of St. Francis (15th-17th centuries)
- Convent of the Nuns of Los Remedios, of which only the Baroque Chapel remains

== See also ==
- List of municipalities in Cáceres
