= Gramática de la lengua castellana =

1492 book on the grammar of the Spanish language by Antonio de Nebrija

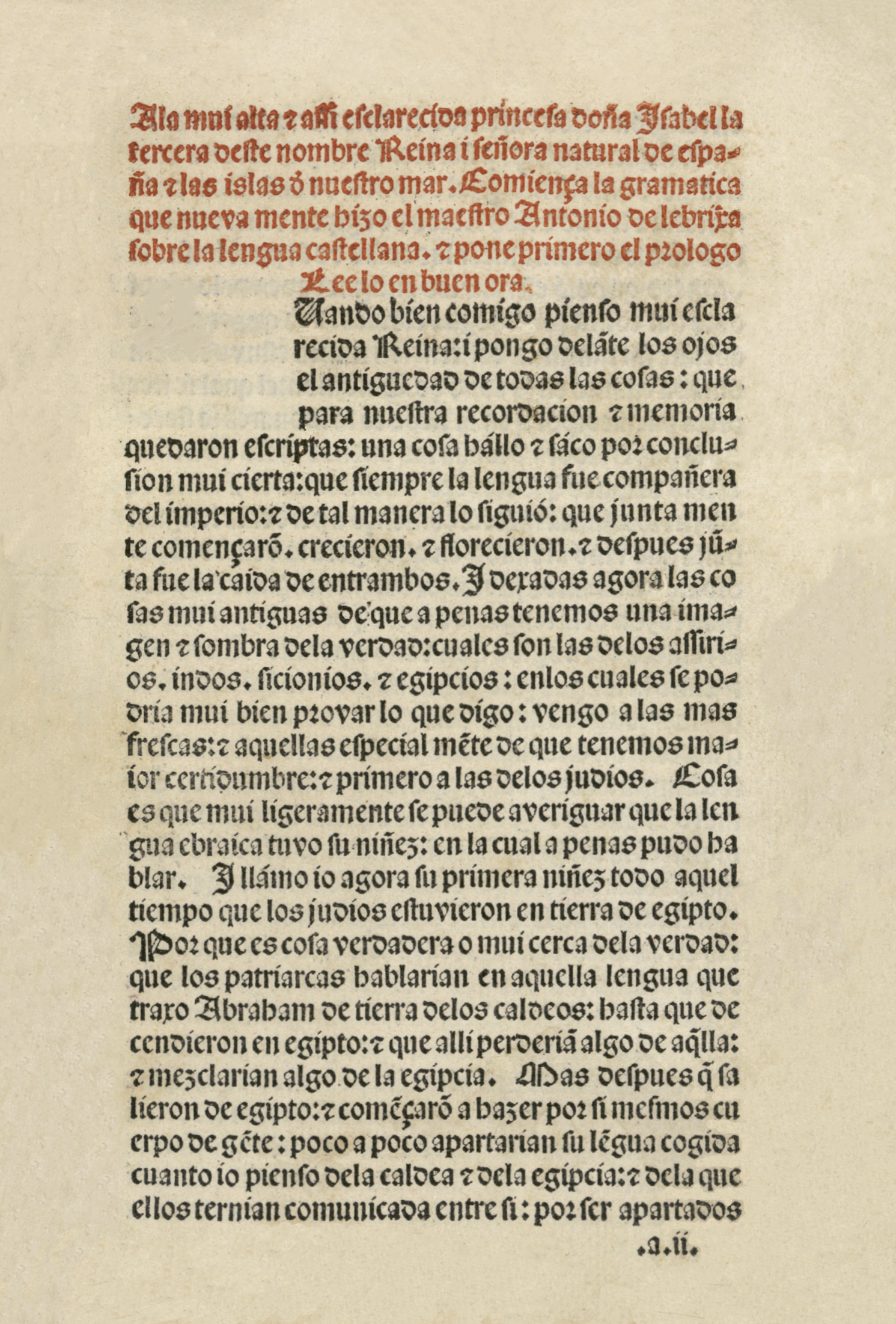
First page of Nebrija's Grammatica: Dedication and prologue

Gramática de la lengua castellana (lit. 'Grammar of the Castilian Language') is a book written by Antonio de Nebrija and published in 1492. It was the first work dedicated to the Spanish language and its rules, and the first grammar of a modern European language to be published. When it was presented to Isabella of Castile at Salamanca in the year of its publication, the queen questioned what the merit of such a work might be; Fray Hernando de Talavera, bishop of Avila, answered for the author Nebrija in a letter addressed to the monarch:

After Your Highness has subjected barbarous peoples and nations of varied tongues, with conquest will come the need for them to accept the laws that the conqueror imposes on the conquered, and among them our language; with this work of mine, they will be able to learn it, as we now learn Latin from the Latin Grammar.

== Contents ==
Nebrija divided his study of the language into four books:

- Orthography
- Prosody and syllables
- Etymology and diction
- Syntax

A fifth book was dedicated to the teaching of Spanish as a foreign language.

The book established ten parts of speech: nouns, pronouns, verbs, participles, prepositions, adverbs, interjections, conjunctions, gerunds and supines.

== Impact ==
Works had previously been published on Latin usage, such as Lorenzo Valla's De Elegantiis Latinae Linguae (1471), but Grammatica was the first book to focus on the study of the rules of a Western European language besides Latin. Following its publication, grammar came to be considered as the discipline concerned with the rules of language, until the advent of linguistics as a scientific discipline in the 19th century.

Other grammars of the Spanish language followed:

- Antonio de Nebrija, Reglas de orthographia en la lengua castellana cõpuestas por el Maestro Antonio de lebrixa ("Rules of orthography [...]", 1517) (bdh.bne.es)
- Juan de Valdés, Dialogo đla lengua ("Dialogue on the language", ca. 1535, manuscript) (bdh.bne.es)
- Andrés Flórez, Arte para bien leer y escribir ("The art of reading and writing well", 1552)
- Martín Cordero, La manera de escribir en castellano (1556)
- Cristóbal de Villalón, Gramática castellana ("Castilian grammar", 1558)
- Gonzalo Correas, Ortografia kastellana, nueva i perfeta ("Castilian orthography [...]", 1630) (bdh.bne.es)
- Real Academia Española, Gramática de la Lengua Castellana, compuesta por el Real Academia Española ("Grammar of the Castilian language", Madrid, 1771) (bdh.bne.es)

== See also ==
- Old Spanish, the contemporary form of Spanish used during the time of the book's publishing.
