= San Benito de Alcántara =

Church in Alcántara, Spain

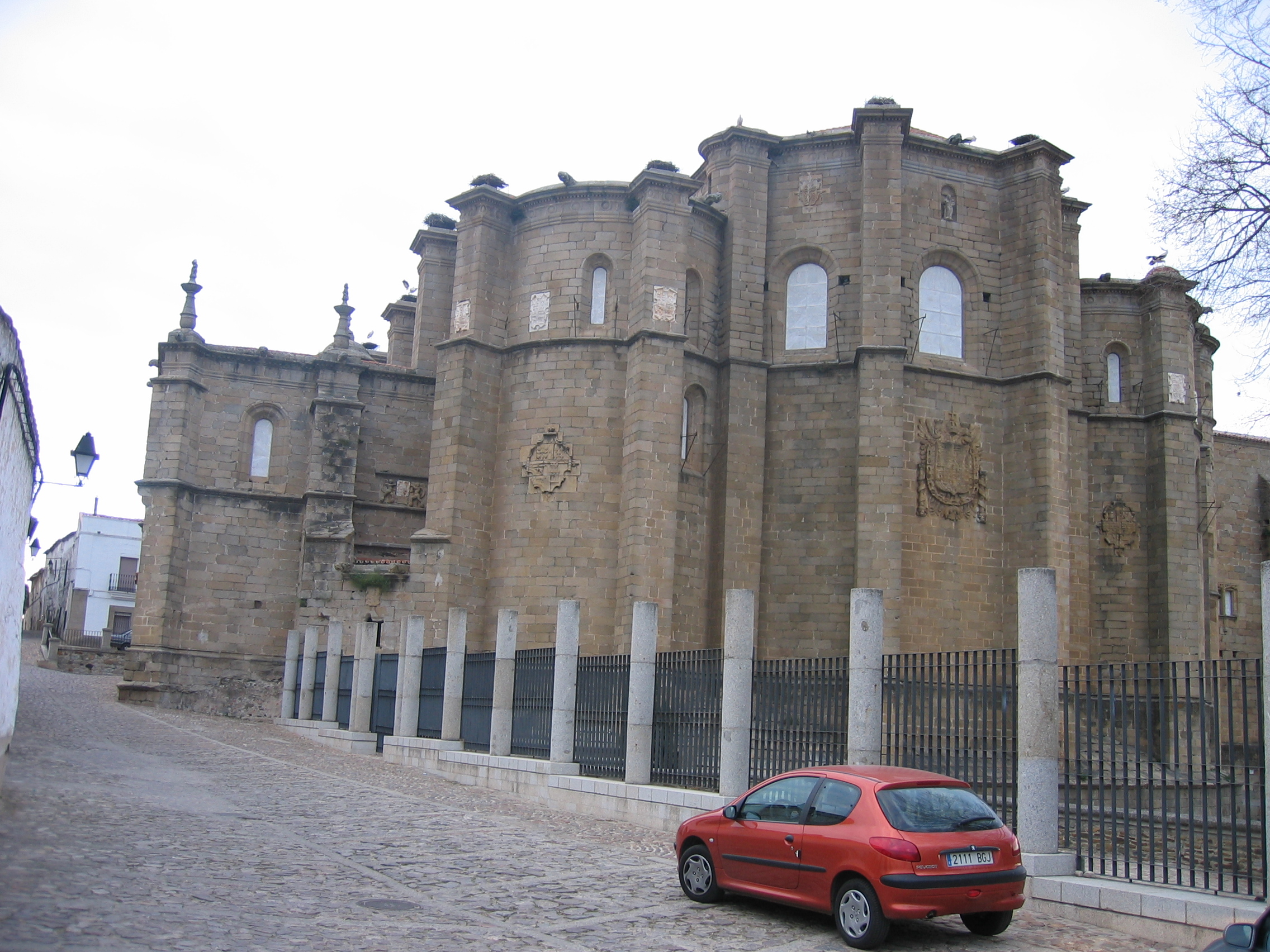
San Benito de Alcántara.

San Benito de Alcántara is a monastery in Alcántara, in the province of Cáceres, Spain.

== History ==
After the Christian conquest of Alcántara in 1213, the city was given to the military Order of Calatrava four years later. In 1218, they in turn ceded it to the order of San Julián de Pereiro, which changed its name to that of the military Order of Alcántara. In 1488, the order's council decided to build a new monastery in the city. Construction began in 1505 and lasted for most of the 16th century. The order's main architect, Pedro de Ybarra, worked on the design.

In 1706, it was sacked during the War of Spanish Succession, and it was damaged by the 1755 Lisbon earthquake. In 1835, it was abandoned and began to fall into ruin. Later it was acquired by Hidroeléctrica Española, which restored it and occupied the structure until 1966. In 1985 it went to the Fundación San Benito de Alcántara.

== Architecture ==
The exterior's main feature are the three apses (the central polygonal and the side ones semicircular), characterized by large coat of arms. Opposite a three-storey loggia with Renaissance arches, a semicircular auditorium has been built; the classical theatre festival of Alcantara is held here in the summer.

The interior has a nave and two aisles.

The cloister, in Gothic-style, has a square plan with two floors. It was built atop a Moorish fortress.
