= Order of Alcántara =

Spanish medieval religious and military order

Order of Alcántara Orden de Alcántara
- The order's emblem, a green Greek cross with a fleur-de-lis at each end
- Type: Religious Order of Honour; Formerly a Military Order
- Country: Spain
- Royal house: Bourbon-Anjou
- Religious affiliation: Catholic
- Sovereign: King Felipe VI
- Grand Master: Prince Pedro, Duke of Calabria

Precedence
- Related: Order of Santiago; Order of Calatrava; Order of Montesa
- Ribbon bar

The Order of Alcántara (Leonese: Orde de Alcántara, Spanish: Orden de Alcántara), also called the Knights of St. Julian, is one of the four Spanish military orders. It was originally a military order of León, founded in 1166 and confirmed by Pope Alexander III in 1177.

== Alcántara ==
Alcántara is a town on the Tagus (which is here crossed by a bridge – cantara in Arabic, hence the name). The town is situated on the plain of Extremadura, a great field of conflict for the Muslims and Christians of Iberian Peninsula in the 12th century. Alcántara was first taken in 1167 by King Ferdinand II of León; In 1174 it fell again into the hands of Abu Yaqub Yusuf; and was not recovered until 1214, when it was taken by King Alfonso IX of León. The Order of Trujillo was the Castilian branch of the order until 1195.

To defend this conquest, on a border exposed to many assaults, the king resorted to military orders. The Middle Ages knew neither standing armies nor garrisons, a deficiency that the military orders supplied, combining as they did military training with monastic stability. In 1214 Alcántara was first committed to the care of the Castilian Knights of Calatrava, who had lately received great support after their performance in 1212 at the battle of Las Navas de Tolosa against the Almohades. Alonzo of León wished to found at Alcántara a special branch of this celebrated order for his realm. However, four years later the Order decided that the post was too far from its Castilian headquarters. They gave up the scheme and transferred the castle, with the permission of the king, to a peculiar Leonese order still in a formative stage, known as the Knights of St Julian de Pereiro.

== History ==
=== Origins of the Order ===
This order's genesis is obscure, but according to a somewhat questionable tradition, St. Julian de Pereiro was a hermit of the country of Salamanca, where by his counsel, some knights built a castle on the river Tagus to oppose the Muslims. They are mentioned in 1176, in a grant of King Fernando of León, but without allusion to their military character. They are first acknowledged as a military order by a papal bull in 1177 by Pope Alexander III. Through their compact with the Knights of Calatrava, they accepted the Cistercian rule and costume, (a white mantle with the scarlet overcross), and they submitted to the right of inspection and correction from the Master of Calatrava. This union did not last long.

=== Internal dissensions ===
The Knights of Alcántara, under their new name, acquired many castles and estates, for the most part at the expense of the Muslims. They amassed great wealth from booty during the war and from pious donations. It was a turning point in their career. However, ambitions and dissensions increased among them. The post of grand master became the aim of rival aspirants. In 1318, the Grand Master, Ruy Vázquez de Quiroga, was besieged by his own Knights, sustained in this by the Grand Master of Calatrava. This rent in their body produced no less than three grand masters in contention, supported severally by the Knights, by the Cistercians, and by the king. The rise of such dissensions could be attributed to the fact that military orders had lost the chief object of their vocation when the Moors were driven from their last foothold in the Iberian Peninsula. Some authors assign as causes of their disintegration the decimation of the cloisters by the Black Death in the fourteenth century, and the laxity which allowed recruitment from the most poorly qualified subjects. Lastly, there was the revolution in warfare, when the growth of modern artillery and infantry overpowered the armed cavalry of feudal times, while the orders still held to their obsolete mode of fighting. The orders, nevertheless, by their wealth and numerous vassals, remained a tremendous power in the kingdom, and before long were involved deeply in political agitations. During the fatal schism between Pedro of Castile and his brother, Henry the Bastard, which divided half Europe, the Knights of Alcántara were also split into two factions which warred upon each other.

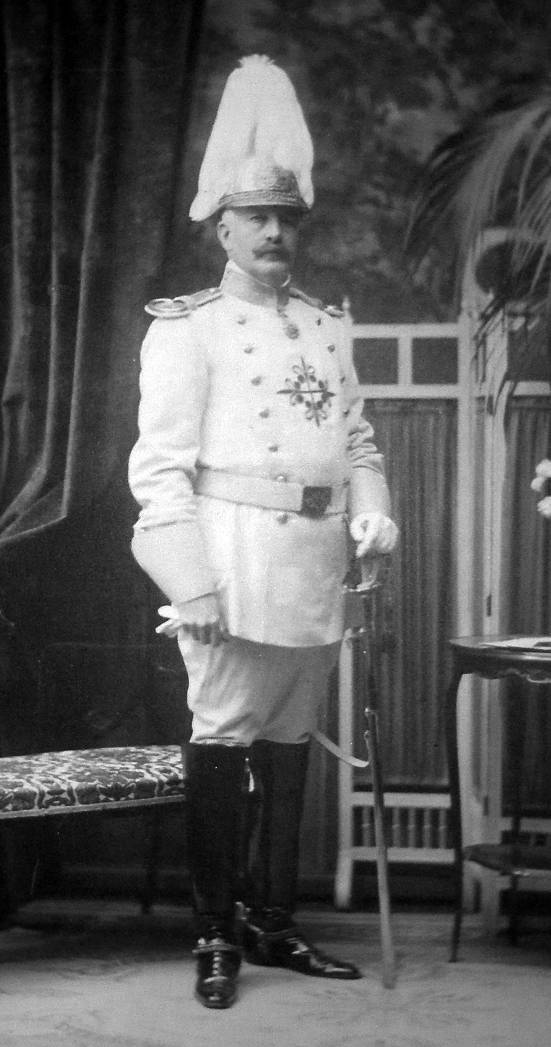
The Marquess of Huarte in uniform of a knight of the Order of Alcántara, c. 1910

=== Royal involvement ===
The kings, on their side, did not fail to take an active part in the election of the grand master, who could bring such valuable support to the royal authority. In 1409, the regent of Castile succeeded in having his son, Sancho, a boy of eight years, made Grand Master of Alcántara. These intrigues went on until 1492, when Pope Alexander VI invested the Catholic King, Ferdinand of Aragon, with the grand mastership of Alcántara for life. Adrian VI went farther, in favour of his pupil, Charles V, for in 1522 he bestowed the three masterships of Spain upon the Crown, even permitting their inheritance through the female line. The Knights of Alcántara were released from the vow of celibacy by the Holy See in 1540, and the ties of common life were sundered. The order was reduced to a system of endowments at the disposal of the king, of which he availed to himself to reward his nobles. There were no less than thirty-seven "Commanderies", with fifty-three castles or villages. Under the French domination the revenues of Alcántara were confiscated, in 1808, and they were only partly given back in 1814, after the restoration of Ferdinand VII.

The Liberal monarchy seized much of the Order's properties in the 1830s, but by royal decree of 7 April 1848 the majority of the benefices of the four Orders were restored. In the Concordat of 1851 the four Military Orders were allowed continued ecclesiastical jurisdiction over their territories, while the titular of the jurisdiction remained the King (or Queen), as administrator of the four Orders by Apostolic Delegation. Certain of the confiscated properties were restored and concentrated together near Ciudad Real, while others distributed more distantly were integrated into the dioceses in which they lay, and were removed from the Order's jurisdiction. The territories now concentrated around the city of Ciudad Real were designated as the new Priory, a Prelature nullius dioeceseos called the "Priory of the four reunited Military Orders of Santiago, Calatrava, Alcántara and Montesa", with the Prior holding the titular diocese of Dora and given as his Priory Church, or Cathedral, the former Parish Church of Santa María del Prado in Ciudad Real. The 1st Spanish Republic proclaimed on 12 February 1873 made as one of its first provisions the abolition of all Military Orders, by decree of 9 March following; the Pope, Pius IX, considering that the Orders' ecclesiastical jurisdiction was thereby rendered ineffective, transferred the administration of their benefices to the closest dioceses, in the Bull Quo graviu of 14 July 1873. The President of the Republic, the Duke of La Torre, seeing this as a concession by the Pope, re-established the Military Orders and their governing body, the Tribunal.

The Bull Ad Apostolicam published on 18 November 1875 re-established the Orders' ecclesiastical jurisdiction and the priory based at Ciudad Real. The solemn inauguration of the Priory followed, on 6 June 1876 and the first Prior appointed on the 29 September next. The administration was now re-titled once again by royal decree of 1 August 1876, as the Tribunal Metropolitano y Consejo de las Órdenes Militares, with the responsibility for regulating the proofs of nobility and the admission and investiture of the knights, the appointment of charges and officers, the creation or suppression of parishes, the construction or repair of churches and chapels, the direction of the benefices and hospitals and modification of regulations or statutes; the government thus formally recognised the continued legal existence of the four Orders.

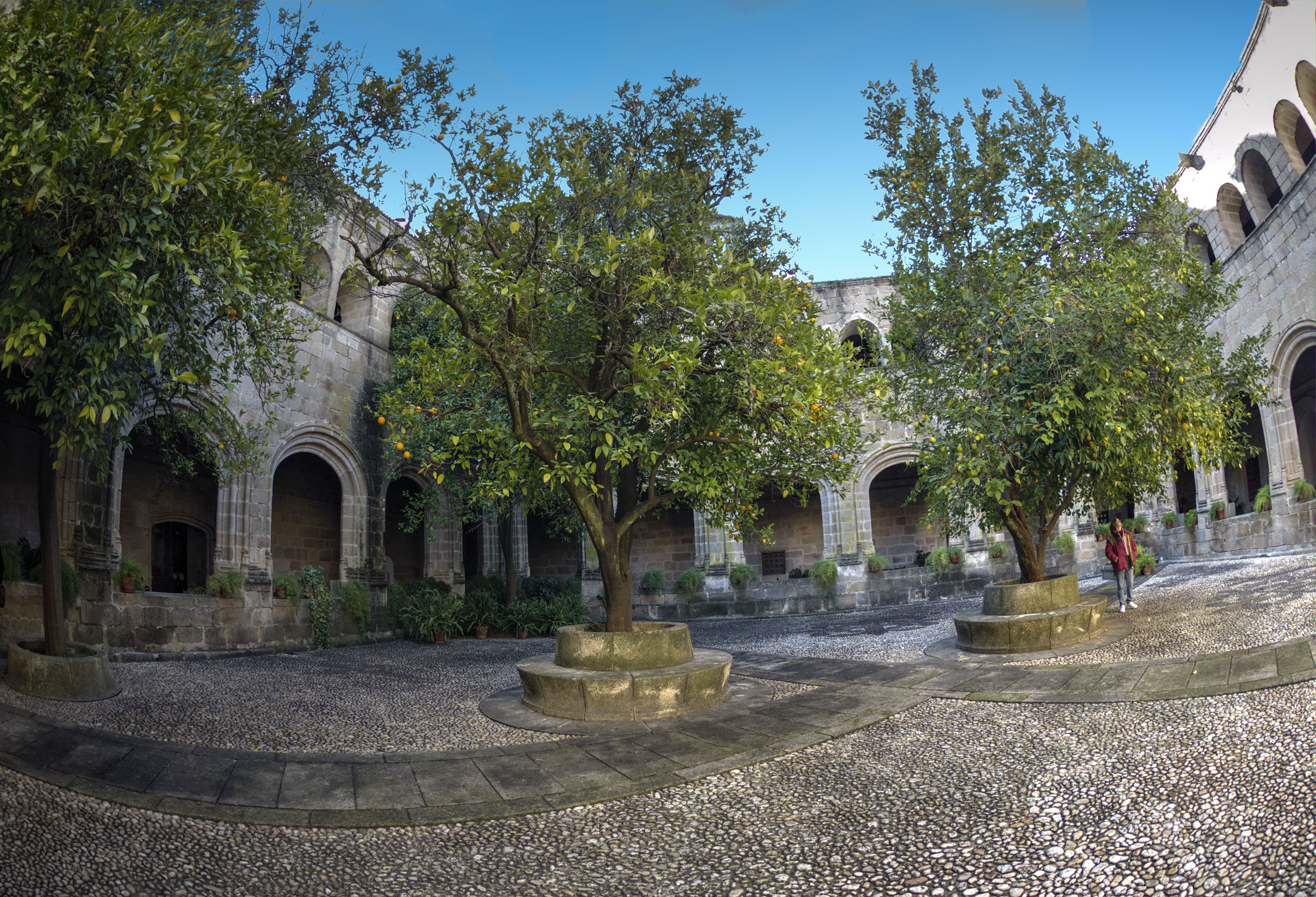
Convent of San Benito, parent headquarters of the order

Alfonso XIII obtained de facto papal approval of his new title of Grand Master and Perpetual Administrator when the Holy See confirmed certain regulations in 1916. A royal decree of 18 February 1906 introduced some modifications to the regulations governing the Metropolitan Tribunal and Council that were the last formal regulations introduced before the fall of the monarchy in 1931. The 2nd Republic purported to suppress the Orders in a decree of 29 April 1931, just two weeks after the proclamation of the Republic, and dissolve the Tribunal but did not mention the Consejo de las Órdenes Militares, leaving the juridical situation of this body intact. The suppression provoked an immediate protest by the Cardinal Primate since the religious character of these Orders was regulated by the Concordat. In a modification of the earlier act, the Ministry of War by a decree of 5 August 1931 declared the four Orders subject to the Spanish law on Associations, to which status it had also converted the five Maestranzas and named a "Junta, or Provisional Commission", to which it gave juridical personality in place of the Consejo.

The Count of Barcelona, father of King Juan Carlos I, was formally nominated by the King "Dean President of the Royal Council of the Orders of Chivalry of Santiago, Calatrava, Alcántara and Montesa" in 1978. Following his death the Grand Commander of the Order of Alcantara, the Infante Carlos, Duke of Calabria, was appointed his successor and upon his death in 2015 his Son Prince Pedro, Duke of Calabria became the head of the Order.

== List of grand masters ==
The following list is taken from Ayala Martínez.

1. Gómez (c.1175–1200)
2. Benito Suárez (1200–1216)
3. Nuño Fernández (1218–1219)
4. García Sánchez (1219–1227)
5. Arias Pérez (1227–1234)
6. Pedro Ibáñez (1234–1254)
7. García Fernández (1254–1284)
8. Fernando Páez (1284–1292)
9. Fernando Pérez Gallego (1292–1298)
10. Gonzalo Pérez (1298–1316)
11. Ruy Vázquez de Quiroga (1316–1318)
12. Suero Pérez (1318–1335)
13. Rodrigo Pérez (1335–1337)
14. Gonzalo Martínez de Oviedo (1337–1340)
15. Nuño Chamizo (1340–1343)
16. Pedro Alfonso Pantoja (1343–1345)
17. Pedro Yáñez de Campo (1345)
18. Fernando Pérez Ponce de León (1346–1355)
19. Diego Gutiérrez de Cevallos (1355)
20. Suero Martínez (1356–1363)
21. Gutierre Gómez de Toledo (1362–1365)
22. Martín López de Córdoba (1365–1367)
23. Pedro Muñiz Godoy (1367)
24. Melén Suárez (1369–1370)
25. Rodrigo Díaz de la Vega (1370–1375)
26. Diego Martínez (1376–1383)
27. Diego Gómez Barroso (1383–1384)
28. Gonzalo Núñez de Guzmán (1384–1385)
29. Martín Yáñez de Barbudo (1385–1394)
30. Fernando Rodríguez Villalobos (1394–1408)
31. Infante Sancho de Aragón (1408–1416)
32. Juan de Sotomayor (1416–1432)
33. Gutierre de Sotomayor (1432–1454)
34. Gómez de Cáceres y Solís (1458–1473)
35. Alonso de Monroy (1473–1477)
  Francisco de Solís (1474–1475), elect
36. Juan de Zúñiga y Pimentel (1477–1494)
